= Bethartoli =

Mountain in Uttarakhand, India

- Location within Uttarakhand

Highest point
- Elevation: 6,352 m (20,840 ft)
- Prominence: 463 m (1,519 ft)
- Listing: Mountains of Uttarakhand
- Coordinates: 30°22′39″N 79°47′14″E

Geography
- Location: Uttarakhand, India
- Parent range: Garhwal Himalaya

Climbing
- First ascent: An Italian Club Alpino Italiano expedition made the first ascent of Bethartoli Himal

Bethartoli is a mountain of the Garhwal Himalaya in Uttarakhand, India.The elevation of Bethartoli is 6,352 metres (20,840 ft) and its prominence is 463 metres (1,519 ft). It is 108th highest located entirely within the Uttrakhand. Nanda Devi, is the highest mountain in this category. It lies 6.6 km east of Ronti and 7.2 km north of Trisul I 7,120 metres (23,360 ft). It lies 9.9 km NW of Devistan I 6,678 metres (21,909 ft). It is located 17.6 km west of Nanda Devi 7,816 metres (25,643 ft) and 7.2 km SW lies Nanda Ghunti 6,309 metres (20,699 ft).

== Climbing history ==
An Italian Club Alpino Italiano made the first ascent of Bethartoli Himal in 1977. Before that there are at least four unsuccessfully attempt made. They climbed from a previously unattempted north ridge. They approached from the Trisuli Nala and established their Base Camp at 14,100 feet just below the northeast face. Camp I was established at 16,400 feet below the face. Camps II and III were at 17,750 and 19,000 feet on the north ridge. On September 17 Cesare Cesa Bianchi, Maurizio Maggi and Renato Moro starting from Camp III for the summit, reached summit at 1 p.m. An hour later they are followed by the other two members, Marco Tedeschi and Gianluigi Landreani, who had ascended directly from Camp II.

=== Accident ===
In a tragic 1970 accident four members of an expedition led by Professor Ramesh G. Desai, died in an avalanche while returning from an unsuccessful attempt on the summit. Seven climbers were caught in an avalanche that buried them 200 feet into a crevassed area. Samant, Passang Temba and Pemba Tschering survived, but the others, Nitin Patel and 3 Sherpas Ang Kami, Chhawang Phinzo and Gnapa, lost their lives.

== Neighboring and subsidiary peaks ==
neighboring or subsidiary peaks of Bethartoli:

- Nanda Devi: 7,816 m (25,643 ft)30°55′12″N 79°35′30″E
- Trisul: 7,120 m (23,360 ft)30°18′36″N 79°46′12″E
- Devistan II: 6,529 m (21,421 ft)30°20′58″N 79°52′50″E
- Devtoli: 6,788 m (22,270 ft)30°17′09″N 79°51′12″E
- Tharkot: 6,099 m (20,010 ft)30°13′30″N 79°49′24″E
- Bethartoli South: 6,318 m (20,728 ft)30°22′03″N 79°47′36″E

== Glaciers and rivers ==
On the southern side lies Bethartoli Glacier. On the western side lies Ronti Glacier and Nanda Ghunti Glacier. All this Glacier drains down to Dhauli Ganga one of the main tributaries of river Alaknanda River. Dhauli Ganga later joins Alaknanda River at Vishnu Prayag the other main tributaries of river Ganga. Alaknanda river merge with Bhgirathi River at Dev Prayag and called Ganga there after.
