= Bethartoli South =

Mountain in Uttarakhand, India

- Location within Uttarakhand

Highest point
- Elevation: 6,318 m (20,728 ft)
- Prominence: 277 m (909 ft)
- Listing: Mountains of Uttarakhand
- Coordinates: 30°22′03″N 79°47′36″E

Geography
- Location: Uttarakhand, India
- Parent range: Garhwal Himalaya

Climbing
- First ascent: Fritz Hieber and Gyalzen summited the Bethartoli south the first ascent of this peak during june 1956.

Bethartoli South is a mountain of the Garhwal Himalaya in Uttarakhand, India.The elevation of Bethartoli South is 6,318 metres (20,728 ft) and its prominence is 277 metres (909 ft). It is 117th highest located entirely within the Uttrakhand. Nanda Devi, is the highest mountain in this category. It is situated in the Nanda Devi sanctuary. It lies 1.3 km south of Bethartoli 6,352 metres (20,840 ft) its nearest higher neighbor. It is 17 km west of Nanda Devi 7,816 metres (25,643 ft)and it lies 8.9 km NW of Devistan 6,678 metres (21,909 ft).

== Climbing history ==
The Bavarian brothers, Adolf and Fritz Hieber, and A lawyer from Bombay, Keki Bunshah, with Sherpa Gyalzen Minchung and his brother Wangdi attempted and climbed a few peaks in Garhwal during June, 1956. The Hiebers attempted Bethartholi's northeast ridge, but Fritz Hieber and Gyalzen summited the Bethartoli south peak, 20,729 feet. This is the first ascent of this peak.

The Climbers Club, Bombay expedition led by Professor Ramesh G. Desai summited Bethartoli South, on 4 June 1970 the summiters were R. G. Desai Harish Kapadia, Chhawang Tashi and Phurba Tharkey. This is the second ascent of Bethartoli south.

A team from the Assam Mountaineering Association led by Atanu Prasad Barua climbed Bethartoli South on September 28, 1970. The summit was reached by Rohini Kumar Bhuyan, Khagendra Nath Bora, Instructor Sher Singh and Sherpas Pemba Tarkay, Nima Tenzing and Nima Dorje. They reached the summit from Camp II at 19,400 feet. They established Base Camp at 14,900 feet in the Nanda Devi Sanctuary on September 22. This is the third ascent of Bethartoli south.

== Neighboring and subsidiary peaks ==
Neighboring or subsidiary peaks of Bethartoli South:

- Bethartoli: 6,352 m (20,840 ft)30°22′03″N 79°47′36″E
- Nanda Devi: 7,816 m (25,643 ft)30°55′12″N 79°35′30″E
- Trisul: 7,120 m (23,360 ft)30°18′36″N 79°46′12″E
- Devistan II: 6,529 m (21,421 ft)30°20′58″N 79°52′50″E
- Devtoli: 6,788 m (22,270 ft)30°17′09″N 79°51′12″E
- Tharkot: 6,099 m (20,010 ft)30°13′30″N 79°49′24″E

== Glaciers and rivers ==
On the southern side lies Bethartoli Glacier. On the western side lies Ronti Glacier and Nanda Ghunti Glacier. All this Glacier drains down to Dhauli Ganga one of the main tributaries of river Alaknanda River. Dhauli Ganga later joins Alaknanda River at Vishnu Prayag the other main tributaries of river Ganga. Alaknanda river merge with Bhgirathi River at Dev Prayag and called Ganga there after.
