= Panwali Dwar =

Mountain in Uttarakhand, India

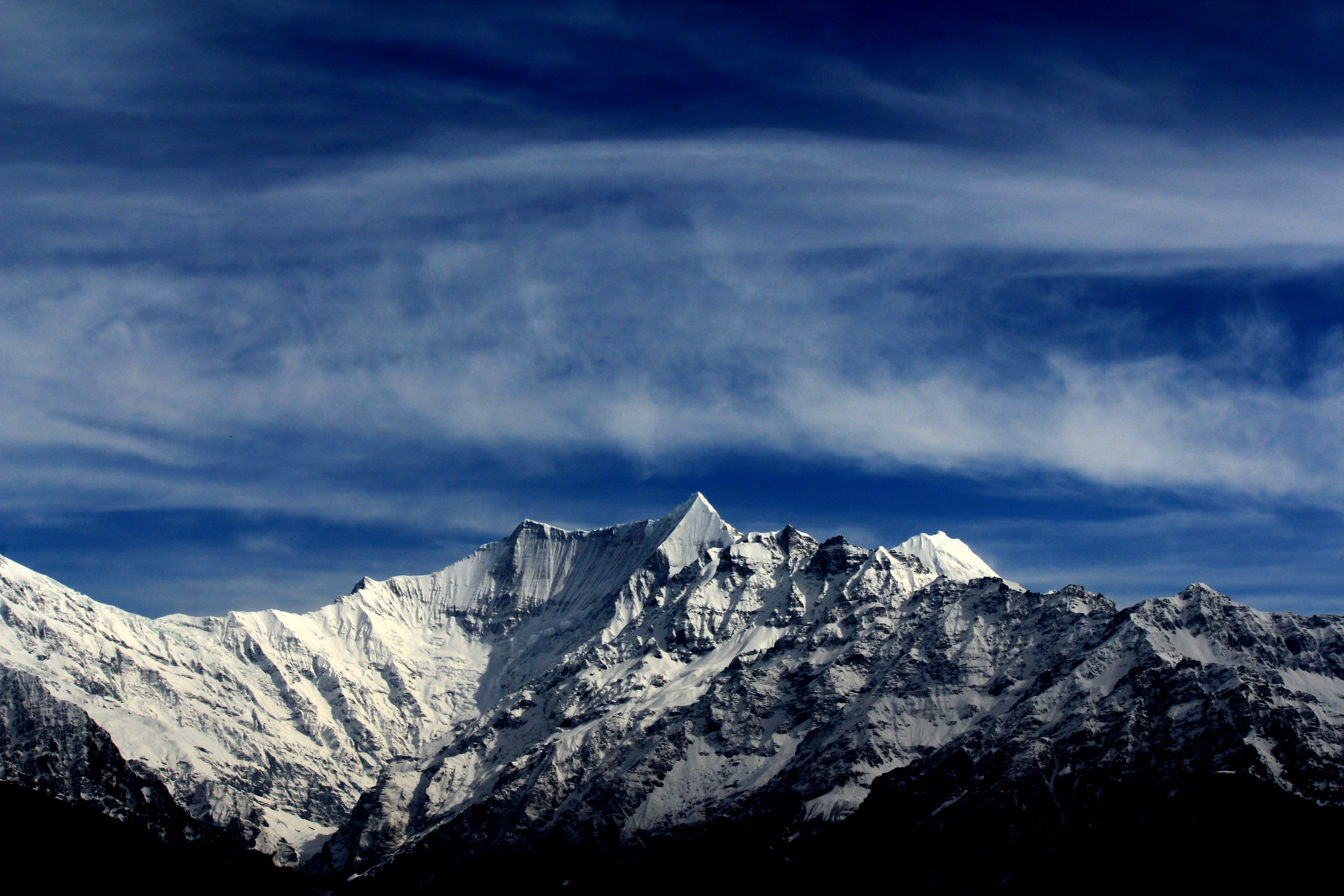
- Panwali Dwar and Nanda Khat from Chiltha Mai near Dhakuri top

Highest point
- Elevation: 6,663 m (21,860 ft)
- Prominence: 763 m (2,503 ft)
- Listing: Mountains of Uttarakhand
- Coordinates: 30°17′22″N 79°57′21″E

Geography
- Location within Uttarakhand
- Location: Bageshwar district, Uttarakhand, India
- Parent range: Kumaun Himalayas

Climbing
- First ascent: A Japanese team climbed it in 1980

Panwali Dwar is a mountain of the Kumaun Himalayas located in the Bageshwar district of Uttarakhand, India. The elevation of Panwali Dwar is 6,683 metres (21,926 ft) and its prominence is 763 metres (2,503 ft). It is 55th highest located entirely within the Uttarakhand. Nanda Devi, is the highest mountain in this category. It lies on southern wall of Nanda devi sanctuary. Its nearest higher neighbor Maiktoli 6,803 metres (22,320 ft) lies 8.2 km WSW. It is located 2.6 km SW of Nanda Khat 6,611 metres (21,690 ft) and 9.2 km NE lies Nanda Devi East 7,434 metres (24,390 ft).

== Climbing history ==
It was first observed by W. Noyce in 1944 but no attempts were made until 1979 when a Japanese team failed on the first assault. They returned in 1980 and successfully climbed it. In 1990 A team from Bombay led by Prajapati Bodane also claimed of climbing Panwali Dwar. On 22 August 2006. a ten-member Indian team of (Mountaineers Association of Krishnanagar, Nadia, West Bengal) made a successful ascent of Panwali Dwar the team led by Debasis Biswas. Basant Singha Roy, Debasis Biswas, Pasang Sherpa and Pemba Sherpa reached the summit. They had followed the traditional route of the first ascent.

== Glaciers and rivers ==
Dakshini Nanda Devi Glacier lies on the northern side of Panwali Dwar. It drains into Rishi Ganga which later joins Dhauli Ganga at Rini and Dhauli Ganga merge with Alaknanda River at Vishnu Prayag one of the main sources of river Ganga. which later joins Bhagirathi river the other main tributaries of river Ganga at Dev Prayag and became Ganga there after. On the east side lies Pindari Glacier from their emerges Pindari River which also joins Alaknanda river at Karn Prayag and became part of Alaknanda river.

== Neighboring peaks ==
The neighboring peaks of Panwali Dwar are:

- Nanda Devi: 7,816 m (25,643 ft)30°55′12″N 79°35′30″E
- Trisul: 7,120 m (23,360 ft)30°18′36″N 79°46′12″E
- Devistan I: 6,678 m (21,909 ft)30°20′24″N 79°52′48″E
- Devtoli: 6,788 m (22,270 ft)30°17′09″N 79°51′12″E
- Tharkot: 6,099 m (20,010 ft)30°13′30″N 79°49′24″E
- Nanda Kot: 6,861 m (22,510 ft)30°16′48″N 79°04′12″E
- Nanda Khat: 6,611 m (21,690 ft)30°18′04″N 79°58′36″E
- Changuch: 6,322 m (20,741 ft)30°17′34″N 79°02′22″E
