= Devistan II =

Mountain in Uttarakhand, India

- Location within Uttarakhand

Highest point
- Elevation: 6,529 m (21,421 ft)
- Prominence: 214 m (702 ft)
- Listing: Mountains of Uttarakhand
- Coordinates: 30°20′58″N 79°52′50″E

Geography
- Location: Uttarakhand, India
- Parent range: Garhwal Himalayas

Climbing
- First ascent: June 1979 by a team from Brown University

Devistan II is a mountain of the Garhwal Himalayas located in the Chamoli district of Uttarakhand, India. Devistan means land of Goddess. The elevation of Devistan II is 6,529 metres (21,421 ft) and its prominence is 214 metres (702 ft). It is 81st joint highest located entirely within the Uttrakhand. Nanda Devi, is the highest mountain in this category. It stands on the western rim of the Nanda Devi Sanctuary. It lies 1 km North of Devistan I 6,678 metres (21,909 ft) and 7.5 km NNE of Devtoli 6,788 metres (22,270 ft) its nearest higher neighbor. Trisul 7,120 metres (23,360 ft) lies 10.6 km WSW and 9.2 km ENE lies Nanda Devi 7,816 metres (25,643 ft).

== Climbing history ==
In the month of May and June 1979 the Brown University Expedition visited the Nanda Devi Sanctuary. The trek started from Reni to Dibrugheta. Base Camp was established in the Sanctuary. Two camps were established on the mountain, Camp II in the saddle between Devistan I and II. Devistan I was climbed from the eastern slopes. Twenty-four members summited Devistan I and another party reached the summit of Devistan II. An American team climbed Devistan I and II led by T A Mutch in 1978.

== Glaciers and rivers ==
Dakshini Rishi Glacier on the eastern side and Trisul Glacier on the western side. both these glacier drains into Rish Ganga. Rishi Ganga met with Dhauli Ganga near Rini. Later Dhauli ganga met with Alaknanda at Vishnu Pryag. Alaknanda River is one of the main tributaries of river Ganga that later joins Bhagirathi River the other main tributaries of river Ganga at Dev Pryag and became Ganga there after.

== Neighboring peaks ==
neighboring peaks of Maiktoli:

- Nanda Devi: 7,816 m (25,643 ft)30°55′12″N 79°35′30″E
- Trisul: 7,120 m (23,360 ft)30°18′36″N 79°46′12″E
- Devistan I: 6,678 m (21,909 ft)30°20′24″N 79°52′48″E
- Devtoli: 6,788 m (22,270 ft)30°17′09″N 79°51′12″E
- Maiktoli: 6,803 m (22,320 ft)30°16′24″N 79°52′18″E
- Tharkot: 6,099 m (20,010 ft)30°13′30″N 79°49′24″E
