= Devistan I =

Mountain in Uttarakhand, India

- Location within Uttarakhand

Highest point
- Elevation: 6,678 m (21,909 ft)
- Prominence: 702 m (2,303 ft)
- Listing: Mountains of Uttarakhand
- Coordinates: 30°20′24″N 79°52′48″E

Geography
- Location: Chamoli, Uttarakhand, India
- Parent range: Garhwal Himalayas

Climbing
- First ascent: 1961 by nine-member team comprising Gurdial Singh and Hari Dang and others

Devistan I is a mountain of the Garhwal Himalayas located in the Chamoli district of Uttarakhand, India. The elevation of Devistan I is 6,678 metres (21,909 ft) and its prominence is 702 metres (2,303 ft). It is 52nd highest located entirely within the Uttrakhand. Nanda Devi is the highest mountain in this category. It stands on the western rim of the Nanda Devi Sanctuary. It lies between the Devisthan II 6,529 metres (21,421 ft) and Devtoli 6,788 metres (22,270 ft). Its nearest higher neighbor Devtoli 6,932 metres (22,743 ft) lies 6.6 km SSW. It is located 1 km South of Devisthan II and 9.6 km NE lies Nanda Devi 7,816 metres (25,643 ft).

== Climbing history ==
In 1961 a nine-member team comprising Gurdial Singh and Hari Dang of The Doon School, Major John D. Dias, Captain K. N. Thadani and Lieutenant (Dr.) N. Sharma of the Indian Army, and Suman Dubey, of Delhi and three sherpa from Darjeeling Kalden, Nima and Lhakpa. They attempt Devistan I (21,910 feet) on the western rim of the Nanda Devi Sanctuary. They set up base camp at 15,000 feet and camp I at 17,500 and camp II at 20,000 feet. On June 16 starting at 8 a.m. they reached summit at 2 p.m. Accomplished by all the members and the Sherpas except for Captain Thadani and Lhakpa.

== Glaciers and rivers ==
Dakshini Rishi Glacier on the eastern side and Trisul Glacier on the western side. both these glacier drains into Rish Ganga. Rishi Ganga met with Dhauli Ganga near Rini. Later Dhauli ganga met with Alaknanda at Vishnu Pryag. Alaknanda River is one of the main tributaries of river Ganga that later joins Bhagirathi River the other main tributaries of river Ganga at Dev Pryag and became Ganga thereafter.

== Neighboring peaks ==
The neighboring peaks of Maiktoli are:

- Nanda Devi: 7,816 m (25,643 ft)30°55′12″N 79°35′30″E
- Trisul: 7,120 m (23,360 ft)30°18′36″N 79°46′12″E
- Devistan II: 6,529 m (21,421 ft)30°20′58″N 79°52′50″E
- Devtoli: 6,788 m (22,270 ft)30°17′09″N 79°51′12″E
- Tharkot: 6,099 m (20,010 ft)30°13′30″N 79°49′24″E
