= Mrigthuni =

Mountain of Kumaon Himalaya in Uttarakhand, India

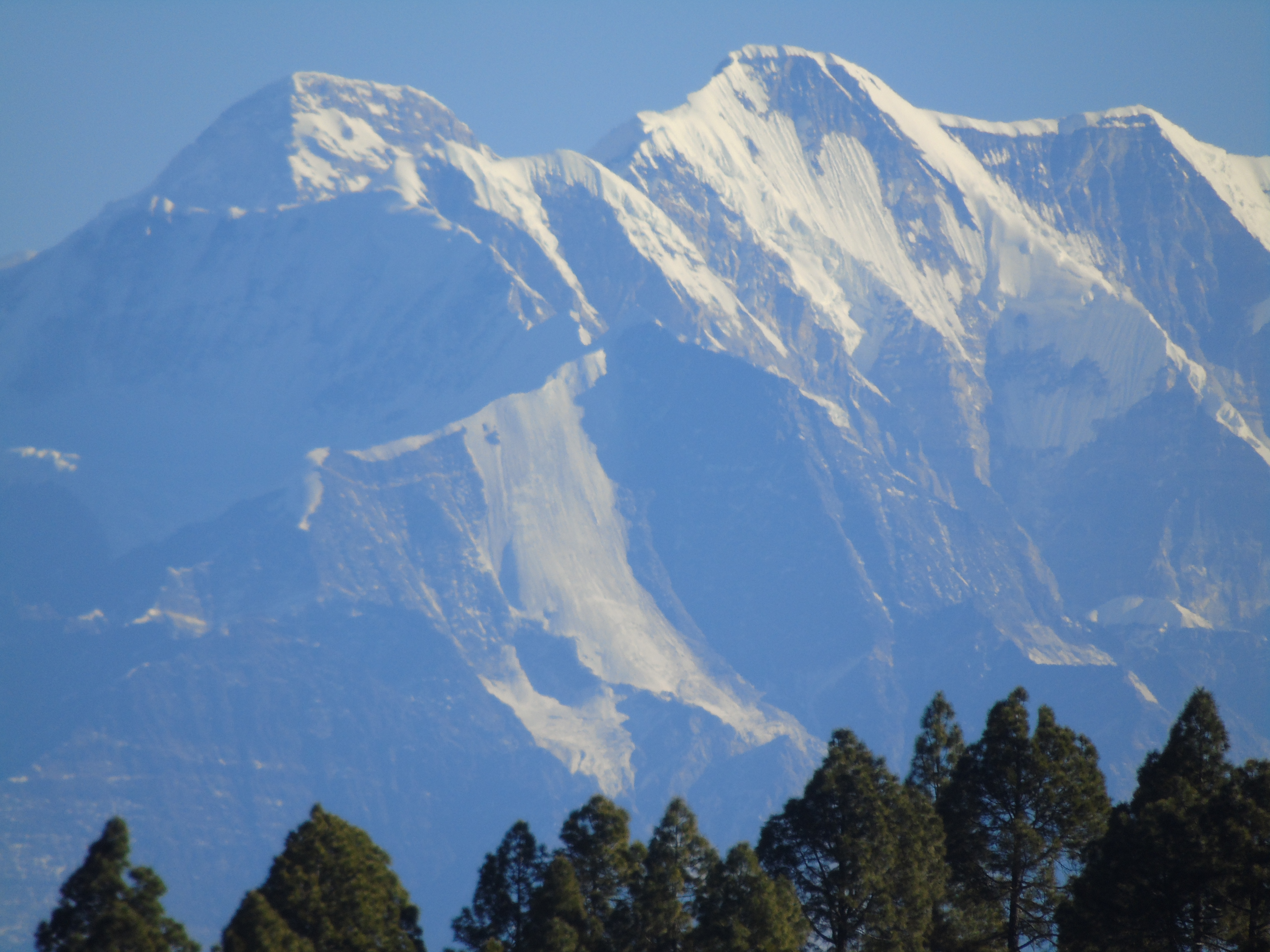
- Mrigthuni

Highest point
- Elevation: 6,855 m (22,490 ft)
- Prominence: 1,060 m (3,480 ft)
- Coordinates: 30°17′24″N 79°49′47″E

Geography
- Location within Uttarakhand
- Location: Bageshwar, Uttarakhand, India
- Parent range: Kumaon Himalayas

Climbing
- First ascent: June 19, 1958 - An Indian expedition led by Gurdial Singh made the first ascent.

Mrigthuni (Hindi: मृगथूनी) is a mountain of Kumaon Himalaya in Uttarakhand, India. Mrigthuni standing majestically at 6855 meter 22,490 feet. Its joint 28th highest located entirely within the Uttarakhand, India. Nanda Devi is the highest mountain in this category. It is the 394th highest peak in the world. It is located at the southern rim of Nanda Devi Sanctuary. It is located just west of Devtoli 6788 meter and north west of Trisul 7120 meter. on the northeast side lies the mighty Nanda Devi 7816 meter and Devistan 6678 meter. on the southern side lies Tharkot 6099 meter.

== Climbing history ==
On June 19, 1958, an Indian expedition led by Gurdial Singh made the first ascent of Mrigthuni 22,490 feet via the northeast face on the southern rim of the Nanda Devi basin in Garhwal. Gurdial Singh, Aamir Ali, Rajendra Vikram Singh, and two Garhwali high-altitude porters reached the summit. In 1964, an all women's team consisting of members from the Bharat Scouts and Guides was led by Joyce Dunsheath to the summit. On 28 September 1976 another Indian group from Serampore, West Bengal, climbed Mrigthuni (22,490 feet). The team consist of Nitai Roy, Sisir Ghosh, Swapan Sikdar, Rajani Rakshit, Ranjit Rit, Yadav Singh and Sher Singh.

In 1981 a Spanish expedition was led by Gonzalo Suárez reached the summit (6885 meters) on 11 September.

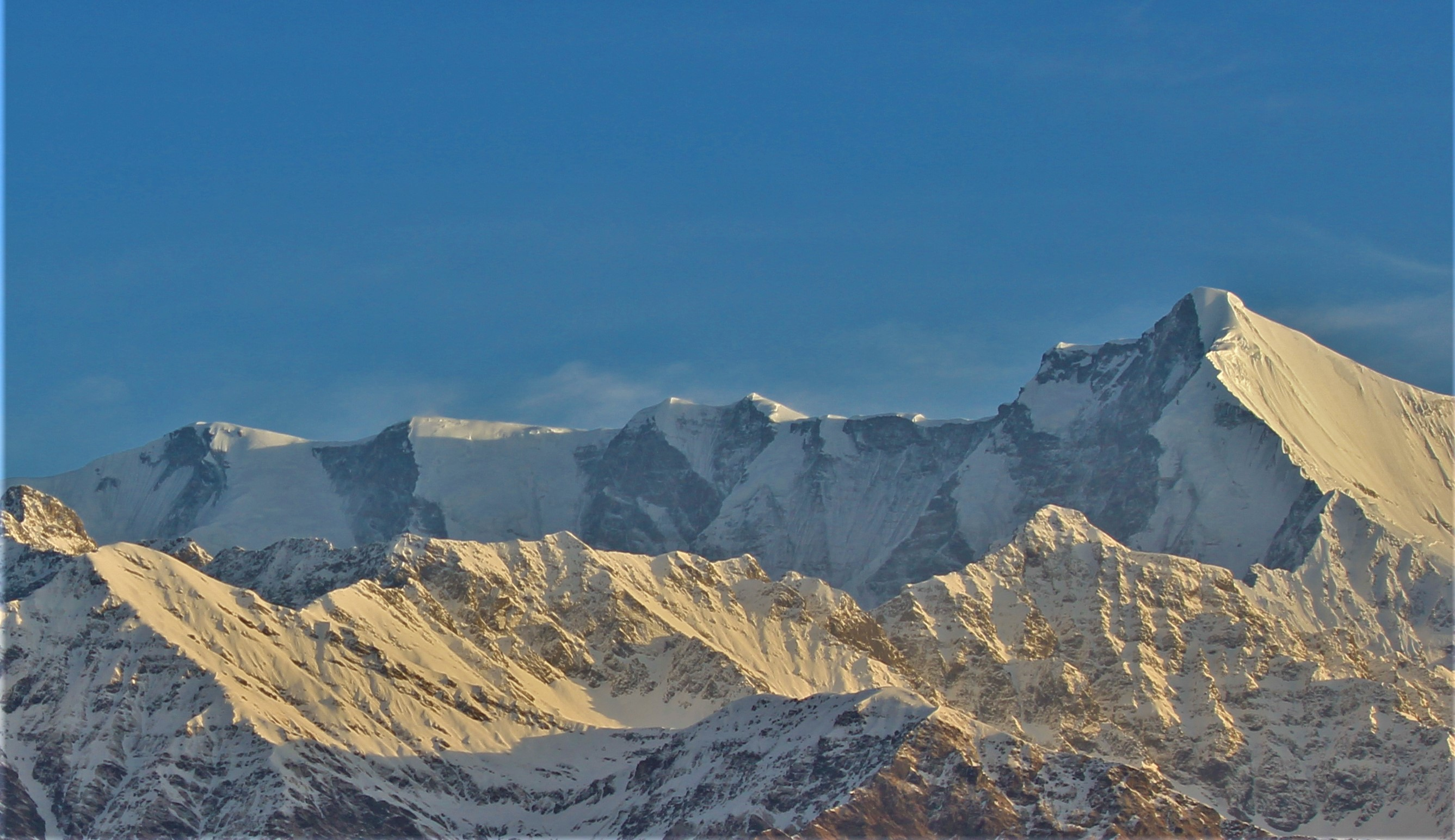
Mrigthuni, Devtoli and Maiktoli from Dhakuri top left to right

== Glaciers and rivers ==
It is surrounded by Glaciers on both sides, the Trisul Glacier on the northern side and Dakshini Rishi Glacier on the eastern side. On the southern side lies Sundardunga Glacier. Trisul nala and Rishi Ganga met with the River Dhauli Ganga near Lata village and Dhauli Ganga met with Alaknanda river at Vishnu Prayag. Alaknanda river is one of the main tributaries of Ganga.

== Neighboring peaks ==
The neighboring peaks of Deoban:

- Nanda Devi: 7,816 m (25,643 ft)30°55′12″N 79°35′30″E
- Trisul: 7,120 m (23,360 ft)30°18′36″N 79°46′12″E
- Maiktoli: 6,803 m (22,320 ft)30°16′24″N 79°52′18″E
- Devistan: 6,678 m (21,909 ft)30°20′24″N 79°52′48″E
- Devtoli: 6,788 m (22,270 ft)30°17′09″N 79°51′12″E
- Tharkot: 6,099 m (20,010 ft)30°13′30″N 79°49′24″E

== See also ==
- List of Himalayan peaks of Uttarakhand
