= Maiktoli =

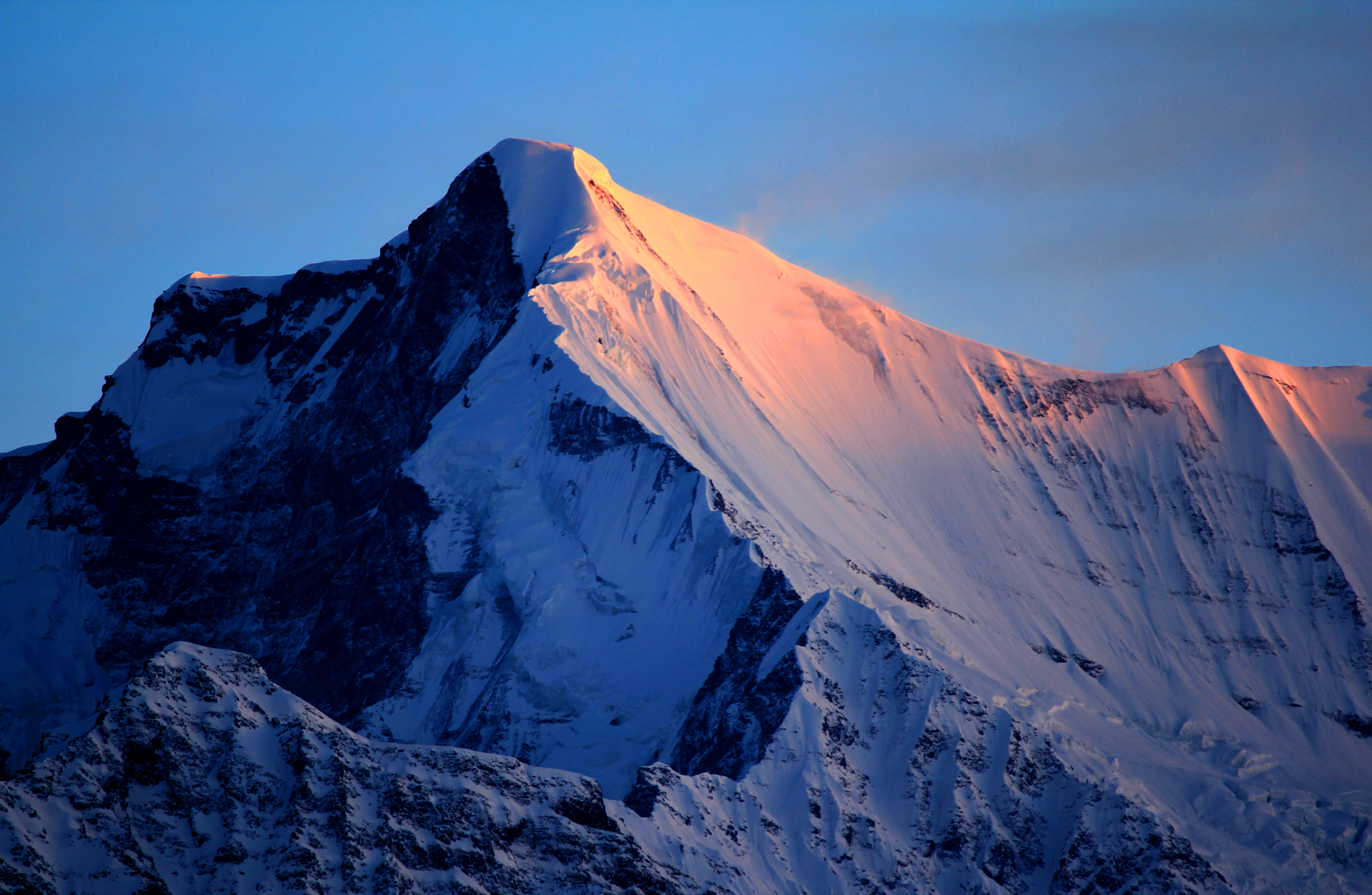
- First light on Maiktoli

Highest point
- Elevation: 6,803 m (22,320 ft)
- Prominence: 268 m (879 ft)
- Coordinates: 30°16′24″N 79°52′18″E

Geography
- Location within Uttarakhand
- Location: Bageshwar, Uttarakhand, India
- Parent range: Kumaun Himalayas

Climbing
- First ascent: In 1934 Eric Shipton Ang Tharkay and Kusang Namgir.

Maiktoli (Hindi: मैकटोली) is a mountain of Kumaun Himalayas located in the Bageshwar district of Uttarakhand state in India. It stands at 6,803 metres (22,320 ft). It is jointly the 32nd highest located entirely within the uttrakhand India. Nanda Devi is the highest mountain in this category. Maiktoli is 479th highest peak in the world. It is located at the southern rim of Nanda Devi Sanctuary. Maiktoli is located just south east of Devtoli (6,788 metres (22,270 ft)) and south east of Trisul (7,120 metres (23,360 ft)). On the north east side lies Nanda Devi (7,816 metres (25,643 ft)) and Panwali Dwar (6,663 metres (21,860 ft)). On the south west side lies Tharkot (6,099 metres (20,010 ft)).

== Climbing history ==
In 1934 Eric Shipton Ang Tharkay and Kusang Namgir climbed Maiktoli during the 1934 Shipton–Tilman Nanda Devi expeditions. In 1961 A nine-member team comprising Gurdial Singh and Hari Dang of the Doon School, Major John D. Dias, Captain K. N. Thadani and Lieutenant (Dr.) N. Sharma of the Indian Army, and Suman Dubey, of Delhi and three sherpa from Darjeeling Kalden, Nima and Lhakpa all climbed on 21 June, the second ascent of Maiktoli. A six-member Japanese team led by Hitoshi Fukuriki made the first ascent of the south ridge of Maiktoli (22,320 feet (6,800 m)). On 29 May Nishimura and Yamaguchi reached the summit, followed by Fukuriki and Nakae on May 31 and on June 1 by Sasamto and Nomura.

== Glaciers and rivers ==
It is surrounded by glaciers with Dakshini Rishi Glacier on the northern side and Sundardunga Glacier on the southern side. Pindari River emerges from southern side of Maiktoli while on the northern side is Rishi Ganga. Rishi Ganga met with Dhauli Ganga near lata. Later Dhauli ganga met with Alaknanda at Vishnu Pryag. Pindari river also met with Alaknanda at Karan Pryag. Alaknanda river is one of the main tributaries of Ganga.

== Neighboring peaks ==
neighboring peaks of Maiktoli:

- Nanda Devi: 7,816 m (25,643 ft)30°55′12″N 79°35′30″E
- Trisul: 7,120 m (23,360 ft)30°18′36″N 79°46′12″E
- Devistan: 6,678 m (21,909 ft)30°20′24″N 79°52′48″E
- Devtoli: 6,788 m (22,270 ft)30°17′09″N 79°51′12″E
- Tharkot: 6,099 m (20,010 ft)30°13′30″N 79°49′24″E

== See also ==
- List of Himalayan peaks of Uttarakhand
- Shipton–Tilman Nanda Devi expeditions
