= Nanda Khat =

Mountain in India

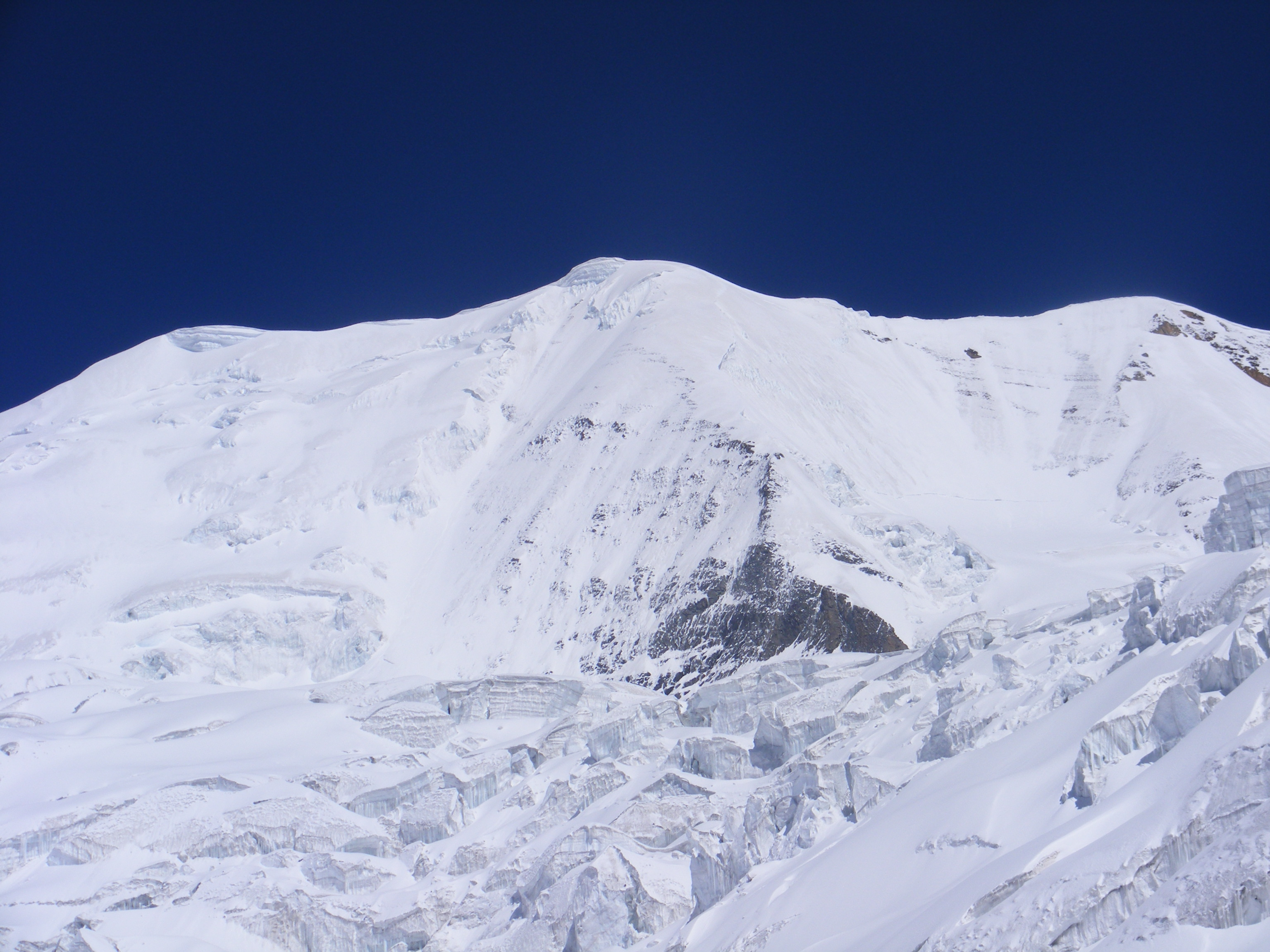

Highest point
- Elevation: 6,611 m (21,690 ft)
- Coordinates: 30°18′06″N 79°58′33″E

Geography
- Location: Bageshwar district, Uttarakhand, India
- Parent range: Kumaun Himalaya

Climbing
- First ascent: 1931 by Huge Ruttledge
- Easiest route: Pindari Valley

Mt. Nandakhat (transl. Bed of Nandadevi) is positioned outside the Nandadevi sanctuary or at the rim of Nandadevi Sanctuary located in the Bageshwar district of Uttarakhand, India. (Longitude 79° 58' 33’’ and Latitude 30° 18' 6’’ N) at an elevation of 6,611 m.

== Geography ==
Situated at the left of Pindari glacier & Traill's pass, this region has peaks like Panwali Dwar (6,663 m) on its left and Changuch (6,322 m) on the right across from the Pindari glacier. Nandadevi (7,816 m) stands to its north, west ridge adjoining Mt. Panwali Dwar (6,663 m). Mt. Nanda khat climbed it in the year 1931 by Huge Ruttledge, Sri PN Choudhary & porter Pansingh. It is dangerous to cross the icefall and the glacier at its snout, which you need to cross as you approach the peak. In 1970, two climbers from a Mumbai-based team were killed in an avalanche in the Pindari glacier. Anup Sah from Nainital, Uttarakhand led the first ascent of this peak on 16 October 1972.

== Climbing Expeditions ==
The 12-member team of the Indian Mountaineering Foundation climbed this difficult peak (first premonsoon expedition) from May June 2010. A mix team of 7 male & 5 female members was led by Dr Anil Ghurtoo. The team faced bad weather during the expedition. Four members including deputy leader Dhruv Joshi, Bharat Bhushan, Takpa Norboo, Chetan Pandey scaled the peak followed by the new route (eastern spur & north ridge) on 22 June 2010 at 1545 hrs, it took them almost 22hrs to reach the summit and descend back to the summit camp.

The team members are as follows: Dr Anil Ghurtoo (Leader), Bianca Dias, Kavitha Reddy, Rajal Patel, Tusi Das, Ribanisha, Dhruv Joshi, Bharat Bhusan, Takpa Norboo, Chetan Pandey, Wallombok Lingdoh & Lalit.

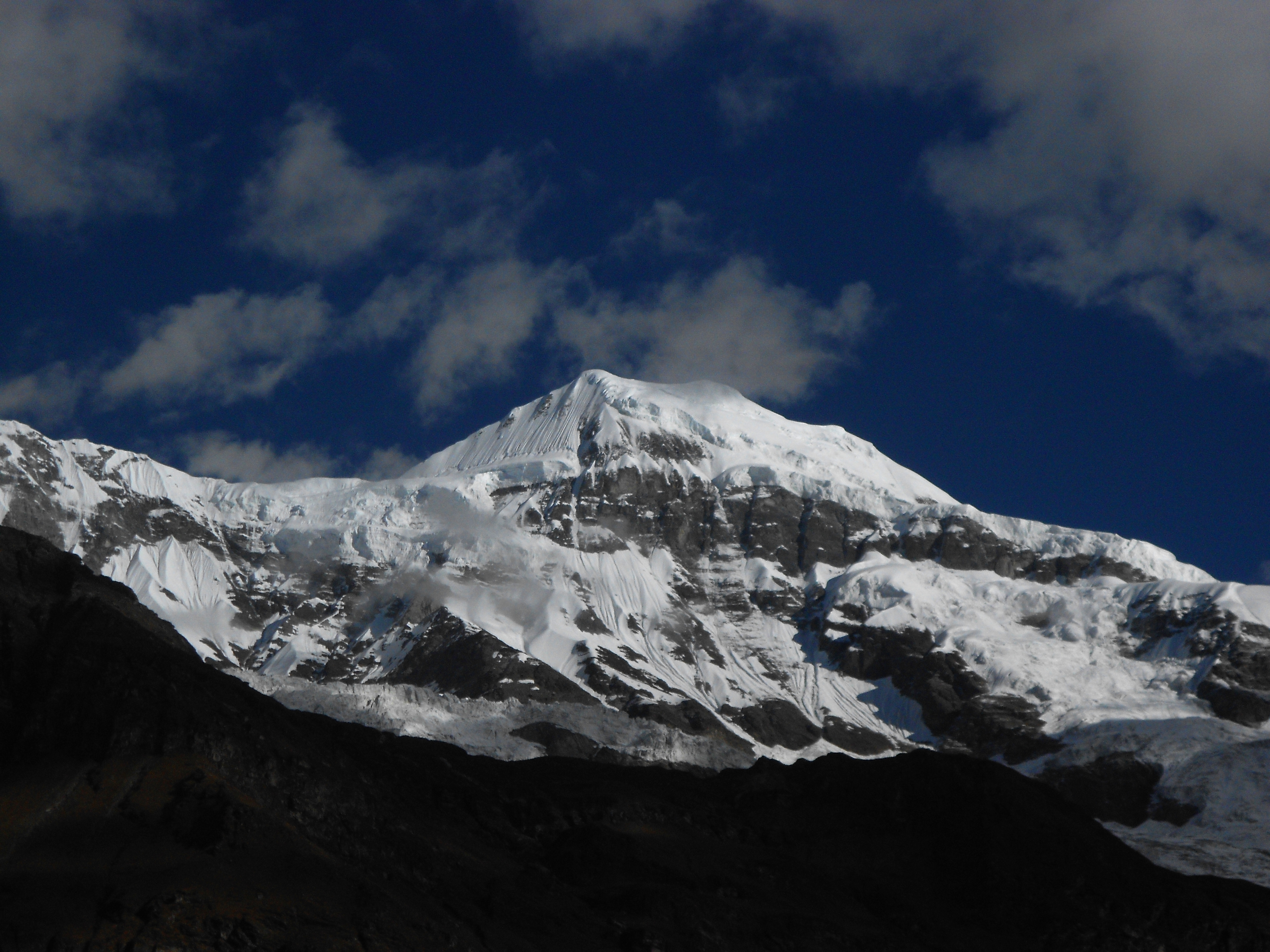
Nanda Khat in the morning

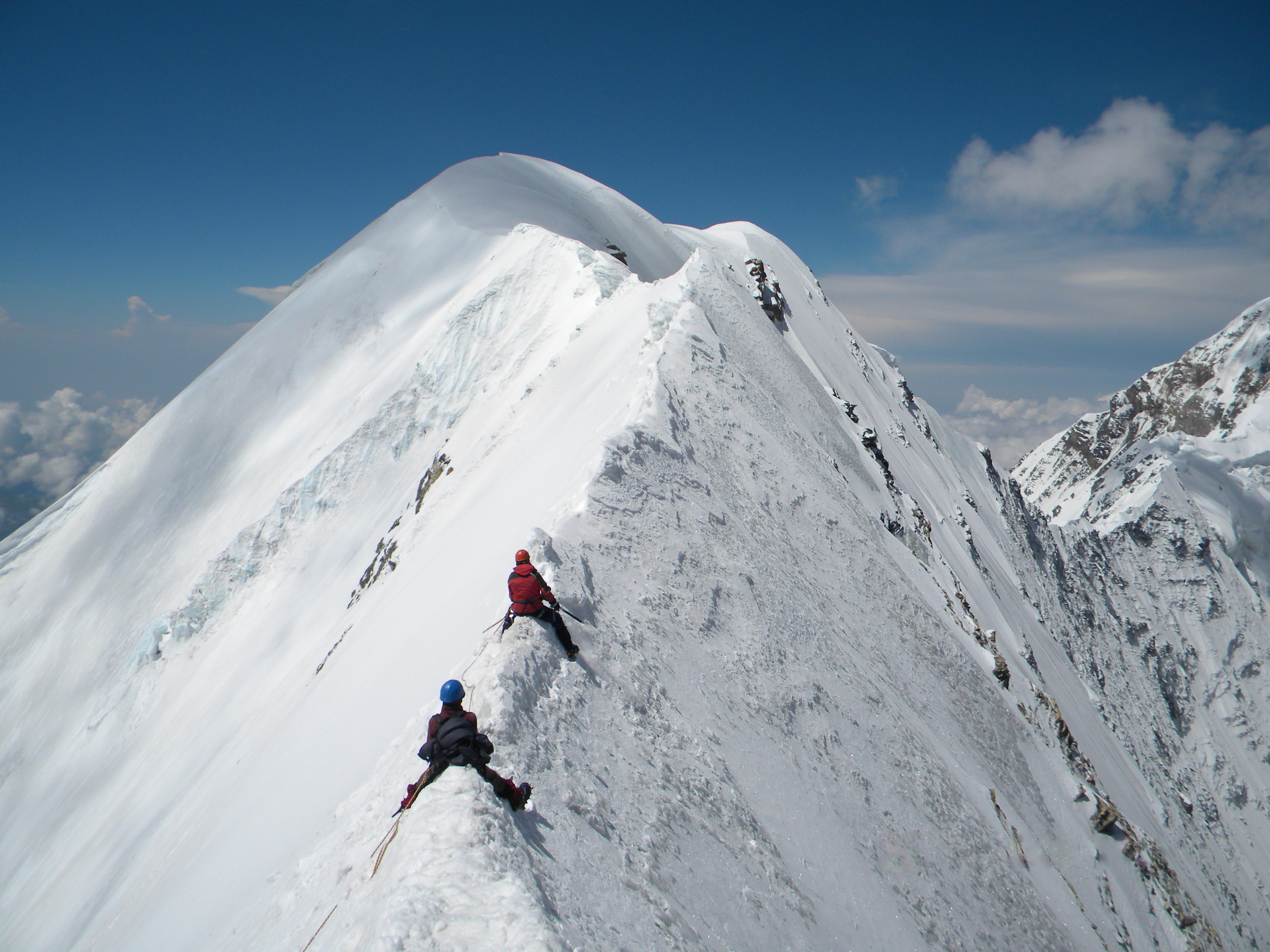
North ridge
