= Tharkot =

Mountain in Uttarakhand, India

- Location within Uttarakhand

Highest point
- Elevation: 6,099 m (20,010 ft)
- Prominence: 671 m (2,201 ft)
- Coordinates: 30°13′30″N 79°49′24″E

Geography
- Location: Bageshwar district, Uttarakhand, India
- Parent range: Kumaon Himalaya

Climbing
- First ascent: C.W.F.Noyce and G.Rawlinson climbed Tharkot in May–June 1944.

Tharkot is a mountain of the Kumaon Himalaya in Uttarakhand India. It is situated near the southern rim of Nanda Devi Sanctuary. The elevation of Tharkot is 6,099 metres (20,010 ft) and its prominence is 671 metres (2,201 ft). It is joint 160th highest located entirely within the Uttrakhand. Nanda Devi, is the highest mountain in this category. It lies 7.3 km SSW of Mrigthuni 6,855 metres (22,490 ft). Devtoli 6,788 metres (22,270 ft) lies 7.5 km NNE and it is 10.8 km SSE of Trisul I 7,120 metres (23,360 ft). It lies 7.2 km SW of Maiktoli 6,803 metres (22,320 ft).

== Climbing history ==
In May–June 1944 Tharkot was first climbed by C.W.F.Noyce and G.Rawlinson. It first came to light when Shipton and Tilman came from the Nanda Devi Sanctuary by climbing down the Sunderdunga col to this valley. The first Indian ascent of Tharkot was by K. P. Sharma's team in 1963. In 1969 Harish Kapadia led a team from Bombay. They met with an avalanche due to that they have to abundant the summit bit.

In 1977 A Japanese team of 29 men and 4 women climbed Tharkot. They approach from the Mrigthuni Glacier make three camps. 24 climbers got to the summit from October 4 to 6.

== Neighboring and subsidiary peaks ==
Neighboring or subsidiary peaks of Tharkot:

- Nanda Devi: 7,816 m (25,643 ft)30°55′12″N 79°35′30″E
- Nanda Ghunti: 6,309 m (20,699 ft)30°20′54″N 79°43′06″E
- Trisul I 7,120 m (23,360 ft)30°18′36″N 79°46′12″E
- Mrigthuni 6,855 m (22,490 ft)30°17′24″N 79°49′47″E
- Devtoli: 6,788 m (22,270 ft)30°17′09″N 79°51′12″E

== Glaciers and rivers ==
Bidalgwar Glacier on the west side of Tharkot and Mrigthuni Glacier, Sukhram Glacier, and Sundardunga Glacier on the eastern side, all the glacier flows from north to south. From the eastern side glaciers comes out Sundardunga river that joins Pindari River near Khati village. Pindari river later joins Alaknanda river at Karnaprayag. Alaknanda River is one of the main tributaries of river Ganga that later joins Bhagirathi River the other main tributaries of river Ganga at Devprayag and became Ganga there after.

== See also ==
- List of Himalayan peaks of Uttarakhand
