= Devtoli =

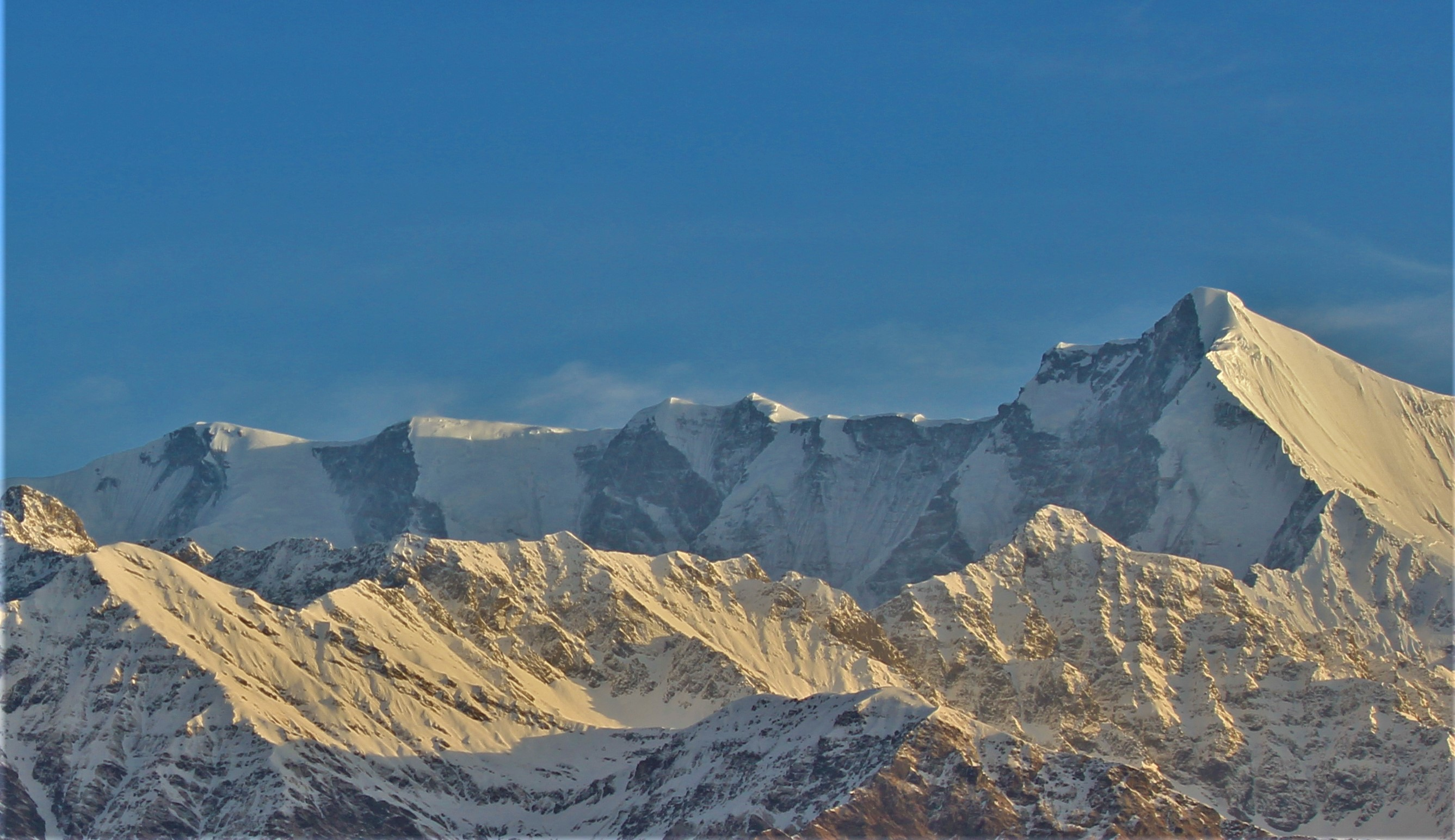
- Mrigthuni, Devtoli and Maiktoli from Dhakuri top Devtoli in the center

Highest point
- Elevation: 6,788 m (22,270 ft)
- Prominence: 96 m (315 ft)
- Listing: Mountains of Uttarakhand
- Coordinates: 30°17′09″N 79°51′12″E

Geography
- Location within Uttarakhand
- Location: Bageshwar district Uttarakhand, India
- Parent range: Kumaon Himalayas

Climbing
- First ascent: 1974 by a six member team led by Harish Kapadia

Devtoli (Hindi: देवटोली) is a mountain of the Kumaon Himalayas located in the Bageshwar district of Uttarakhand, India. It stands at 6,788 metres (22,270 ft). It is 36th highest located entirely within Uttarakhand. Nanda Devi is the highest mountain in this category. It is located at the southern rim of Nanda Devi Sanctuary. Devtoli is located just north west of Maiktoli (6,803 metres (22,320 ft)) and east of Mrigthuni (6,855 metres (22,490 ft)). On the north east side lies Nanda Devi (7,816 metres (25,643 ft)) and Panwali Dwar (6,663 metres (21,860 ft)) on the east side. Tharkot on the southern side.

== Climbing history ==
In 1974 a six-member team led by Harish Kapadia, "The Mountaineers" from Mumbai, achieved the first ascent in their name. On 13 June Harish Kapadia and Mahesh Desai reached the summit at 1 p.m; while returning Kapadia fell into a crevasse after a snow bridge collapsed. After being pulled out but unable to walk, he was carried down on a makeshift sledge a total of six days to base camp before being airlifted by an Indian Army helicopter to a military hospital. In 1979 a Japanese expedition led by Fujiro Konno climbed Devtoli.

== Glaciers and rivers ==
Devtoli is surrounded by glaciers with Dakshini Rishi Glacier on the northern side and Sundardunga Glacier on the southern side. Pindari River emerges from southern side of Devtoli while on the northern side is Rishiganga. Rishi Ganga meets with Dhauliganga near lata. Later Dhauli ganga meets with Alaknanda at Vishnu Pryag. Pindari river also meets with Alaknanda at Karan Pryag. Alaknanda is one of the main tributaries of the Ganges.

== Neighboring peaks ==
neighboring peaks of Maiktoli:

- Nanda Devi: 7,816 m (25,643 ft)30°55′12″N 79°35′30″E
- Trisul: 7,120 m (23,360 ft)30°18′36″N 79°46′12″E
- Devistan: 6,678 m (21,909 ft)30°20′24″N 79°52′48″E
- Maiktoli: 6,803 m (22,320 ft)30°16′24″N 79°52′18″E
- Tharkot: 6,099 m (20,010 ft)30°13′30″N 79°49′24″E
