= Harish Kapadia =

Indian mountain climber (born 1945)

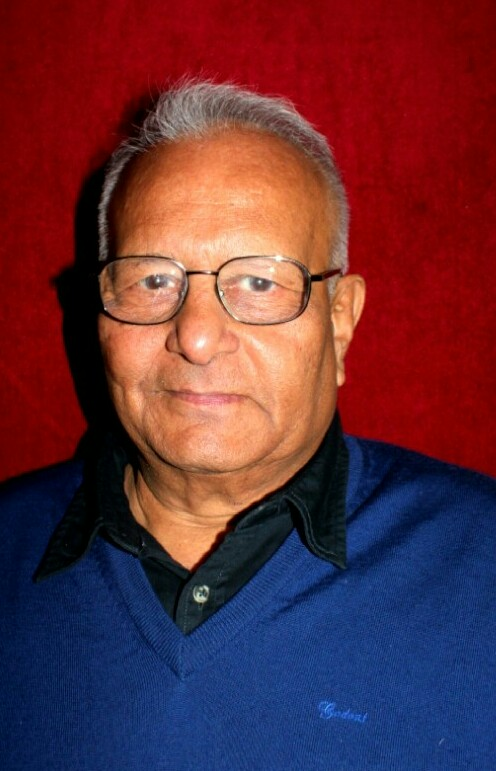
- Harish Kapadia, explorer and mountaineer
- Born: 11 July 1945 (age 81); Mumbai, India
- Spouse: Geeta Kapadia
- Children: Sonam Kapadia (son) (Deceased) Lt. Nawang Kapadia (son)

Harish Kapadia (born 11 July 1945) is a Himalayan mountaineer, author and long-time editor of the Himalayan Journal from India.

He has written numerous books and articles on the Indian Himalayas. and has been invited to many countries to lecture on his Himalayan exploits.

== Biography ==
He began climbing and trekking in the range around Mumbai, the Western Ghats. His first visit to the Himalayas was almost 40 years ago. His main contribution to Himalayan climbing has been to explore unknown areas and, in number of cases, to open up climbing possibilities. Among his major ascents are Devtoli (6,788 metres (22,270 ft)), Bandarpunch West (6,102 metres (20,020 ft)), Parilungbi (6,166 metres (20,230 ft)) in 1995, and Lungser Kangri (6,666 metres (21,870 ft)), the highest peak of Rupshu in Ladakh. He led eight international joint expeditions, five with British, two with French and one with Japanese mountaineers, to high peaks, such as Rimo I (7,385 metres (24,229 ft)), Chong Kumdan Kangri I (7,071 metres (23,199 ft)), Sudarshan Parvat, Padmanabh (7,030 metres (23,060 ft)), and the Panch Chuli and Rangrik Rang groups.

In 1974, he fell into a crevasse at 6,200 metres (20,300 ft), deep inside the formidable Nanda Devi Sanctuary. He was carried by his companions for 13 days to the base camp where a helicopter rescued him. He was operated on for a dislocated hip-joint and had to spend two years walking on crutches, but that did not keep him out for too long and he has climbed for three decades after the injury.

== Publications ==
Kapadia has published twelve books. His Trek The Sahyadris has become a standard reference for all trekkers in the Western Ghats. His other books, Exploring the Hidden Himalaya (with Soli Mehta), High Himalaya Unknown Valleys and Meeting The Mountains, cover his various trips to the Himalayas, while Spiti Adventures in the Trans-Himalaya covers climbing and trekking in that region. He has been the editor of the Himalayan Journal from 1980 to 1986, and since 1990, bringing the journal to international standards and continuing it as a major authentic reference on the range.

His book, Meeting The Mountains can be seen while standing in the queue at Disney's Animal Kingdom for Expedition Everest. While passing along the line, one passes by many glass cases displaying the history of mountains and, at one point, there is what is supposed to look like an office with his book on the top bookshelf.

In appreciation of his authorship of many books and his stewardship of the Himalayan Journal as an editor for 35 years, he was further honoured by the Korea Alpen Book Club and made an honorary member. Due his long work as editor of the Himalayan Journal, Kapadia became an important chronicler of mountaineering.

== Personal life ==
Kapadia has a degree in commerce, law and management from University of Mumbai and is a cloth merchant by profession. He is married and lives in Bombay. His son, Lieutenant Nawang Kapadia, who was commissioned on 2 September 2000 in the Fourth Battalion the Third Gorkha Rifles, died while fighting Pakistan-based terrorists in the jungles of Rajwar in the Kupwara district of Srinagar on 11 November 2000. Since then, Kapadia has lectured about this conflict, particularly in the Siachen Glacier. He has been discussing a proposal for a peace park in the Siachen glacier region and cleaning up the environmental damage there.

== Awards ==
Kapadia has been elected as an honorary member of the American Alpine Club and the (British) Alpine Club. He was a vice president of the Indian Mountaineering Foundation (1997–1999).

In 1993 he was awarded the Indian Mountaineering Foundation (IMF) Gold Medal. In 2003, the Queen approved the award of the Patron's Medal of the Royal Geographical Society to him. He was also awarded the Tenzing Norgay National Adventure Award 2003 for lifetime achievement by the President of India and the King Albert Mountain Award presented by The King Albert I Memorial Foundation in 2006.

On 3 November 2017, in Seoul, South Korea, Kapadia was awarded the Piolets d'Or Asia Life Time Achievement Award for his mountaineering and exploratory endeavors, he is the first Indian to receive this prestigious award.

In recognition of his contributions to Himalayan exploration and peace campaigning he was awarded the 2024 Ulsan Ulju Mountain Culture Award at the 2024 Ulsan Ulju Mountain Film Festival in Korea.

== Legacy ==
Kapadia donated an archive of video interviews to the UK Alpine Club which feature notable figures from the world of mountaineering, the donation includes a substantial collection of images. He has also donated a substantial number of photographs and maps to the American Alpine Club and to the Swiss National Museum, which are setting up the Lt. Nawang Kapadia Collection. This is in addition to the Lt. Nawang Kapadia Library already in existence at the Himalayan Club.

== Notable climbs ==
Total peaks climbed: 33

First ascents: 21

- Jatropani (4,071 metres (13,356 ft))
- Ikulari (6,059 metres (19,879 ft))
- Bethartoli Himal South (6,318 metres (20,728 ft)) (Garhwal)
- Shiti Dhar (5,290 metres (17,360 ft)) (H.P.)
- Devtoli* (6,788 metres (22,270 ft))
- Kalabaland Dhura* (6,105 metres (20,030 ft))
- Koteshwar II* (5,690 metres (18,670 ft))(Garhwal)
- Yada (4,115 metres (13,501 ft))
- Jalsu (4,298 metres (14,101 ft)) (H.P.)
- Lagma* (5,761 metres (18,901 ft)),
- Zumto* (c.5,800 metres (19,000 ft))
- Tserip* (c.5,980 metres (19,620 ft))
- Kawu* (c.5,910 metres (19,390 ft)) (Spiti)
- Kalanag (6,387 metres (20,955 ft))
- Bandarpunch West* (6,102 metres (20,020 ft)) (Garhwal)
- Parilungbi (6,166 metres (20,230 ft))
- Runse* (6,175 metres (20,259 ft))
- Gyadung* (6,160 metres (20,210 ft))
- Geling* (c. 6,100 metres (20,000 ft))
- Lama Kyent* (c.6,040 metres (19,820 ft))
- Labrang* (c.5,900 metres (19,400 ft)) (Spiti)
- Nandi* (5,795 metres (19,012 ft)) (Garhwal)
- Laknis* (6,235 metres (20,456 ft))
- Chogam (6,250 metres (20,510 ft))
- Skyang (5,770 metres (18,930 ft)) (East Karakoram)
- Panchali Chuli* (5,220 metres (17,130 ft))
- Draupadi* (5,250 metres (17,220 ft)) (Kumaon)
- Khamengar (5,760 metres (18,900 ft)) (Spiti)
- Mangla* (5,800 metres (19,000 ft))
- Kunda*(5,240 metres (17,190 ft)) (Kinnaur)
- Lungser Kangri* (6,666 metres (21,870 ft))
- Chhamser Kangri(6,622 metres (21,726 ft)) (Ladakh)
- Bhagat Peak* (5,650 metres (18,540 ft)) (Garhwal)

== Bibliography ==
- Exploring the Hidden Himalaya
- Trek the Sahyadris
- High Himalaya Unknown Valleys
- Spiti Adventures in the Trans-Himalaya
- Meeting The Mountains
- Across Peaks and Passes in Kumaun
- Across Peaks and Passes in Garhwal
- Across Peaks and Passes in Himachal Pradesh
- Across Peaks and Passes in Ladakh, Zanskar and East Karakoram
- Across Peaks and Passes in Darjeeling and Sikkim Himalaya
- A Passage to Himalaya (editor)
- Trekking and Climbing in Indian Himalaya
