= Trisul =

Mountain in Uttarakhand, india

Trishul
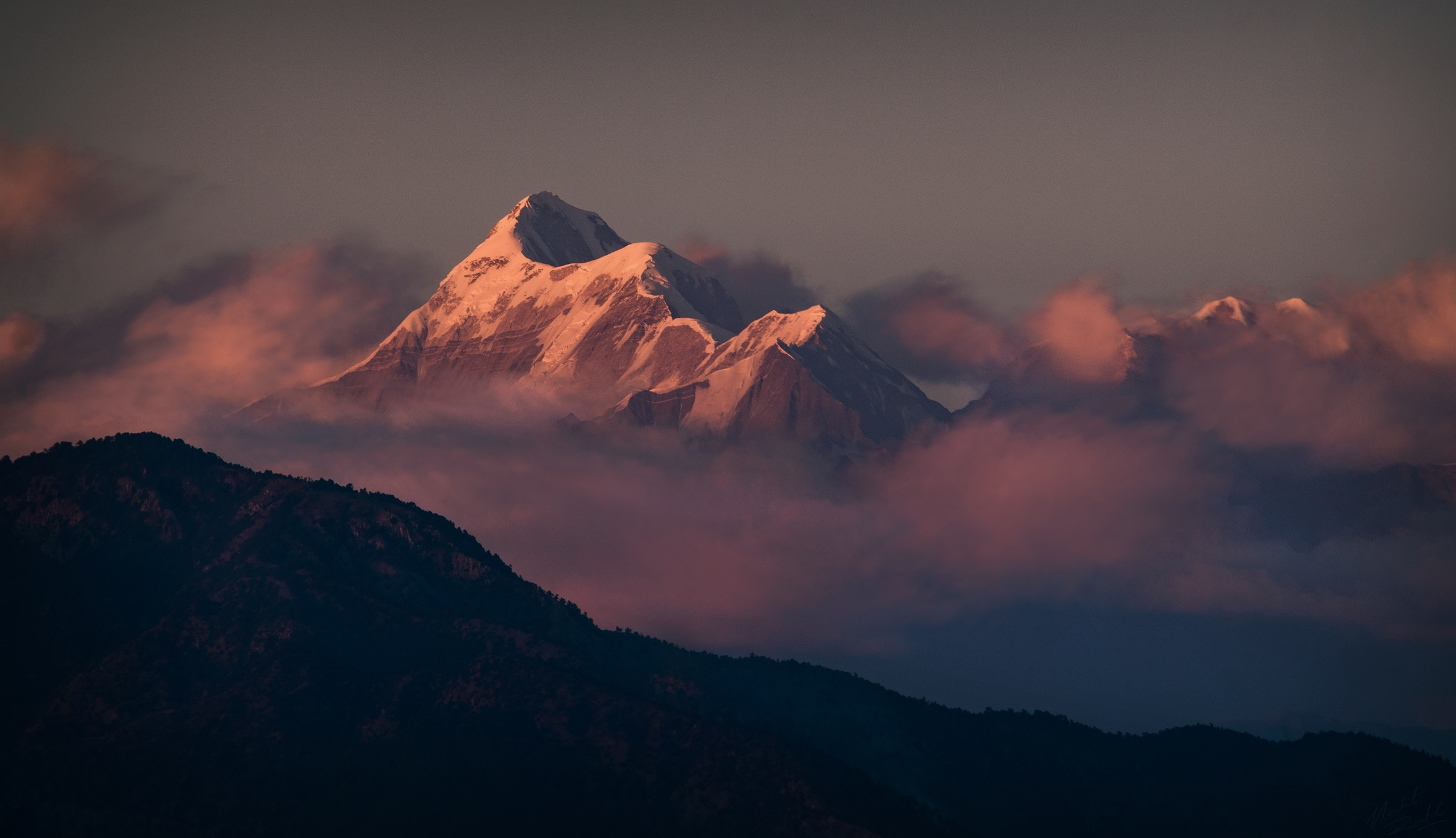
- Trishul from Ranikhet

Highest point
- Elevation: 7,120 m (23,360 ft)
- Prominence: 1,616 m (5,302 ft)
- Listing: Ultra
- Coordinates: 30°18′46″N 79°46′38″E

Geography
- Location within India
- Location: Chamoli district, Uttarakhand
- Parent range: Garhwal Himalaya

Climbing
- First ascent: 12 June 1907 by Tom Longstaff, A. Brocherel, H. Brocherel, Karbir
- Easiest route: Northeast flank/north ridge: snow/glacier climb

Trisul or Trishul is a group of three Himalayan mountain peaks situated mainly in the Chamoli district (Garhwal), with its southern ridges extending into the Kumaon region of Uttarakhand, India. with the highest (Trisul I) reaching 7120m. The three peaks resemble a trident - in Sanskrit, Trishula, trident, is the weapon of Shiva. The Trishul group forms the southwest corner of the ring of peaks enclosing the Nanda Devi Sanctuary, about 15 kilometres (9 mi) west-southwest of Nanda Devi itself. The main peak, Trisul I, was the first peak over 7,000 m (22,970 ft) to have ever been climbed, in 1907.

== Description of the massif and neighbouring peaks ==
The three peaks are named Trisul I, Trisul II, and Trisul III. The massif is a north-south ridge, with Trisul I at the north end and Trisul III at the south. The massif runs roughly North-South, and hence appears compressed when viewed from the south (Ranikhet, Kausani), and more stretched out from the Southeast (Chamoli, Bedini Bugyal).

Nanda Ghunti lies a few Kilometres to the northwest, while Mrigthuni is just to the southeast.

Mountain	Height (m)	Height (ft)	Coordinates	Prominence (m)	First ascent
Trisul I	7,120	23,359	30°18′46″N 79°46′38″E	1616	1907
Trisul II	6,690	21,949	30°17′24″N 79°46′12″E	<200	1960
Trisul III	6,007	19,708	30°15′00″N 79°46′12″E	<200	1960

== Climbing history ==
=== Trisul I ===
T. G. Longstaff made the first climbing reconnaissance of Trisul, in September 1905, focussing on the western and southern sides. He returned in 1907 with Charles Granville Bruce, Arnold L. Mumm; the three Alpine guides Moritz Inderbinnen and the brothers Henri and Alexis Brocherel; and a number of Gurkhas, including Karbir Burathoki. They ascended through the Rishiganga valley, to the north of the peak, onto the Trisul Glacier, which lies on the east side. From there they climbed the northeast flank to the north ridge, reaching the summit on 12 June. At the time Trisul was probably the highest mountain to have been climbed, a record which stood until the ascent of Pauhunri in 1911. The climb was noted also for the first use of supplementary oxygen in a major climb.

The second successful climb was made by Peter Roderick Oliver in 1933. Unusually, two successful climbs were made on consecutive days in June 1951. On 23 June 1951, the summit was reached by Gurdial Singh, teacher at the Doon School and Roy Greenwood, instructor at Dehradun. Both were members of the Himalayan Club. On 24 June 1951, Robert Walter was the first Frenchman to reach the summit, with Sherpa Nyima Tensing. Walter was headmaster of Calve College in Pondicherry. (Due to his medical knowledge, he is often referred to as a doctor in contemporary writing.) He wrote about his experiences on Trisul in articles for the journal Alpinisme and for the magazine Point de Vue Images du Monde. In June 1949, Walter had achieved the third ascent of Pauhunri. As a result of his Pauhunri and Trisul climbs, he became a member of the Groupe de Haute Montagne in 1954, sponsored by Maurice Herzog and Robert Tézenas du Montcel.

Routes on the west face and south ridge of Trisul I have also been climbed. The south side was first ascended in 1976 by a Yugoslavian expedition, with Slovenian climbers Andrej Graseli and Štefan Marenče reaching the peak on 15 May, followed by Vanja Matijevec the following day. There was a notable ski expedition to Trisul by Indian Institute of Skiing and Mountaineering, Gulmarg with Lt Col N. Kumar as the leader.

=== Trisul II and III ===
Trisul II and Trisul III were first climbed in 1960 by the Yugoslav team JAHO I. They climbed from the Bidalgwar glacier, achieving the summit of Trisul II via the southern ridge and Trisul III via the north ridge.

Another Yugoslav expedition made the first traverse of the three peaks in 1987, and two members paraglided from the summit.

== Access ==
The Trisul massif can be accessed via the following route: Almora - Kausani - Garur- Gwaldam - Debal - Bagargad - Wan - Bedini Bugyal - Kalu Vinayak - Roopkund - Trisul.

== See also ==
- List of ultras of the Himalayas

== Other sources ==
- This My Voyage by T. G. Longstaff.
- Across Peaks and Passes of Kumaun Himalayas by Harish Kapadia.

== Gallery ==
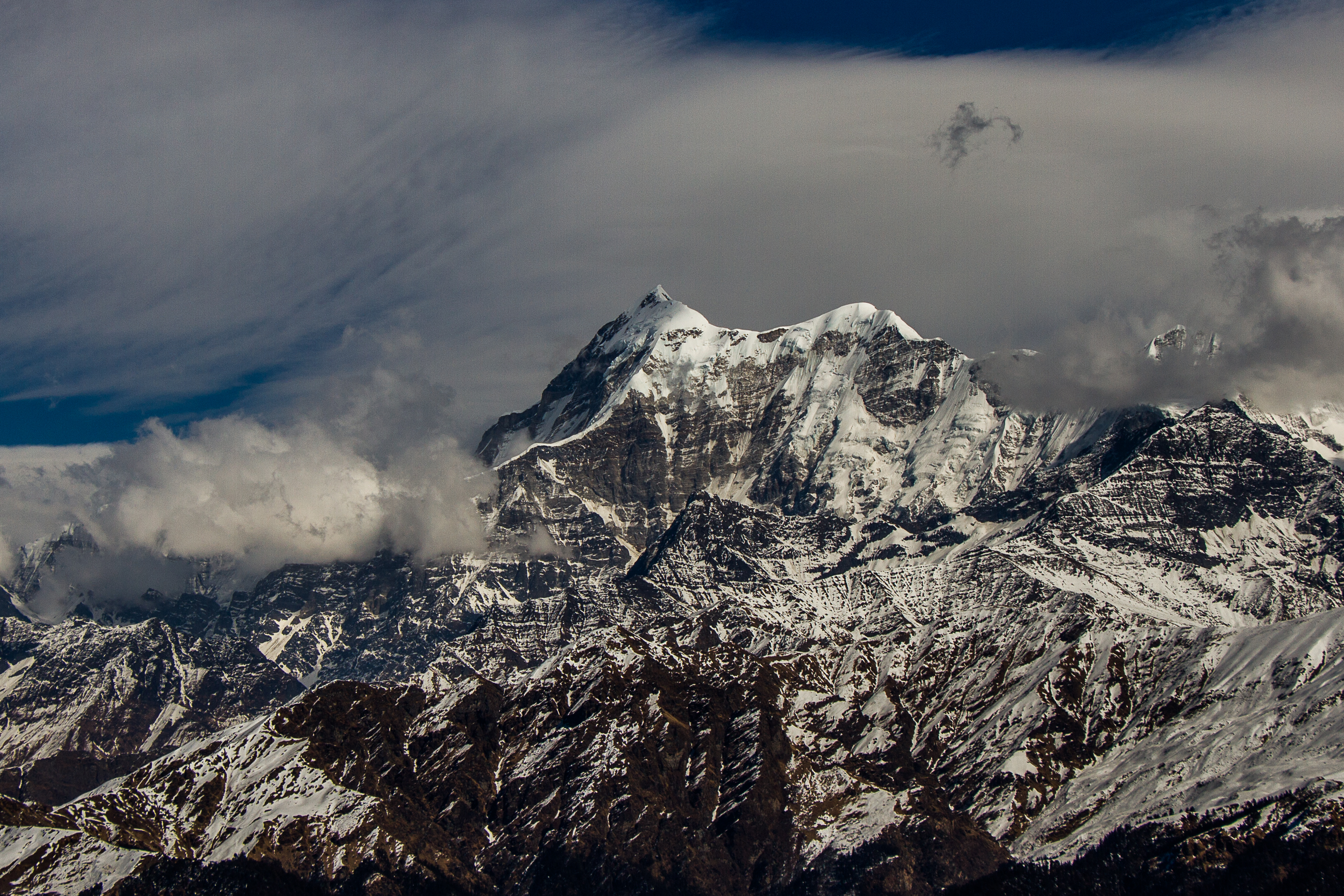
Trisul 1 and 2 as seen from Brahma Tal trek

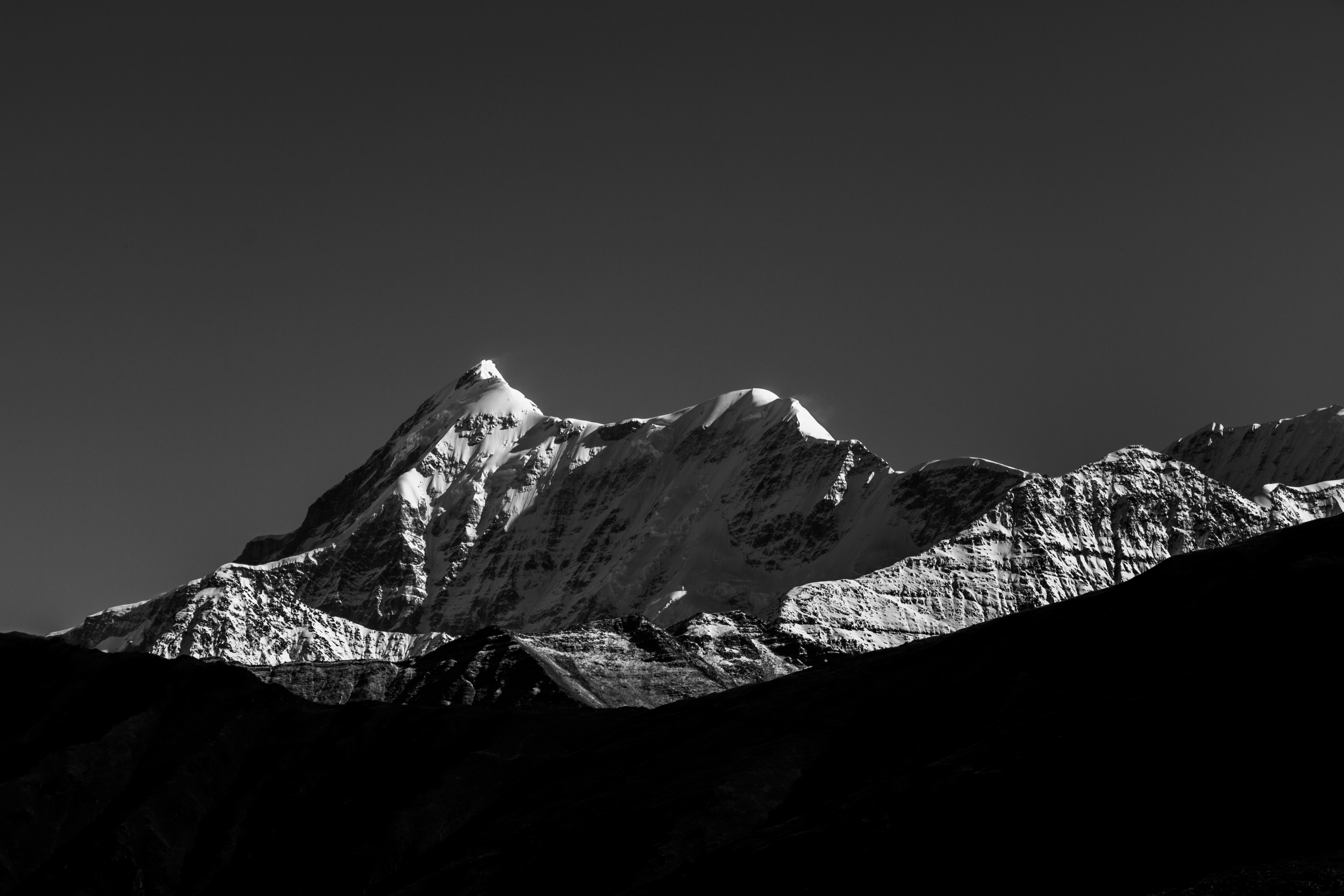
Trisul on the way to Roopkund from Bedni Bugyal

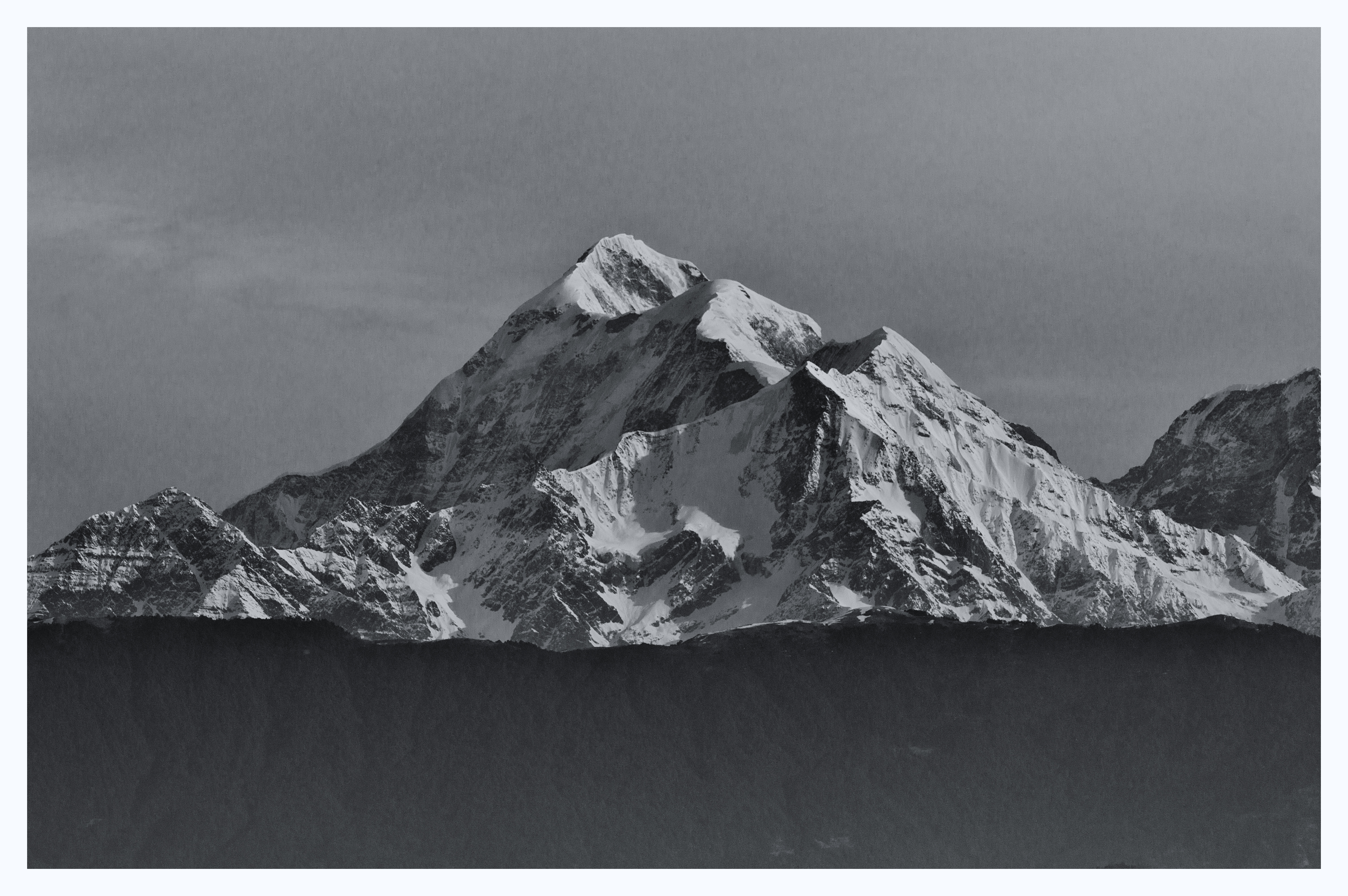
Trisul 1 from Kausani

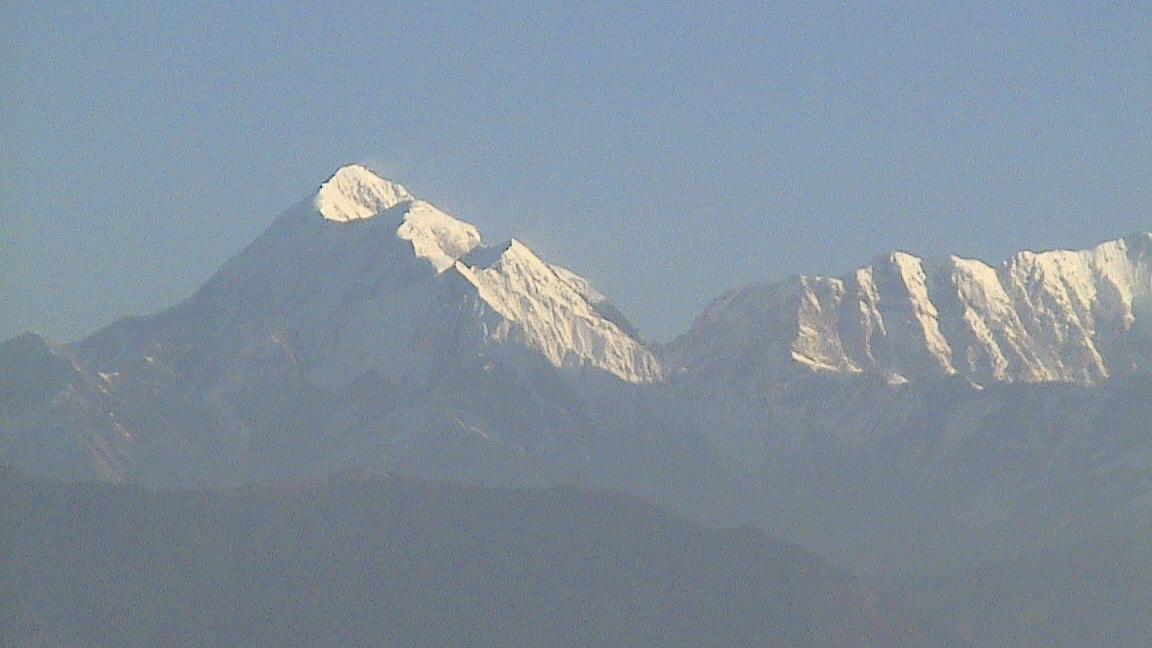
Trisul from Kausani, Uttarakhand

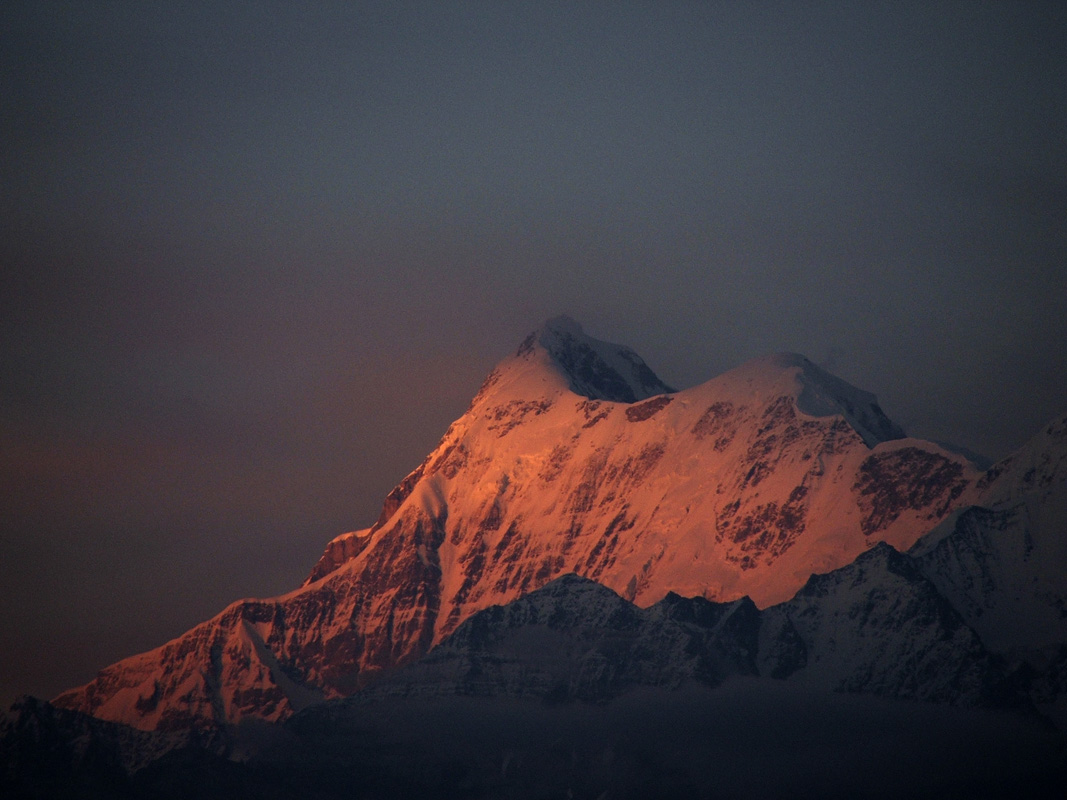
Sunset on Trisul

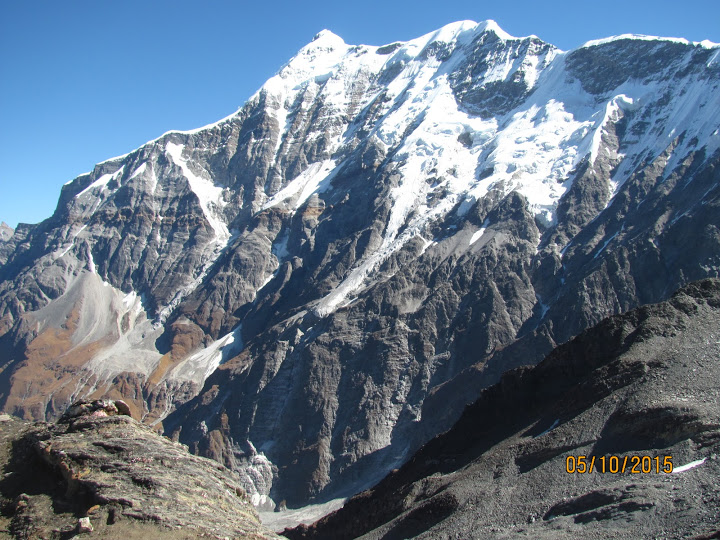
Trishul seen from Junargali

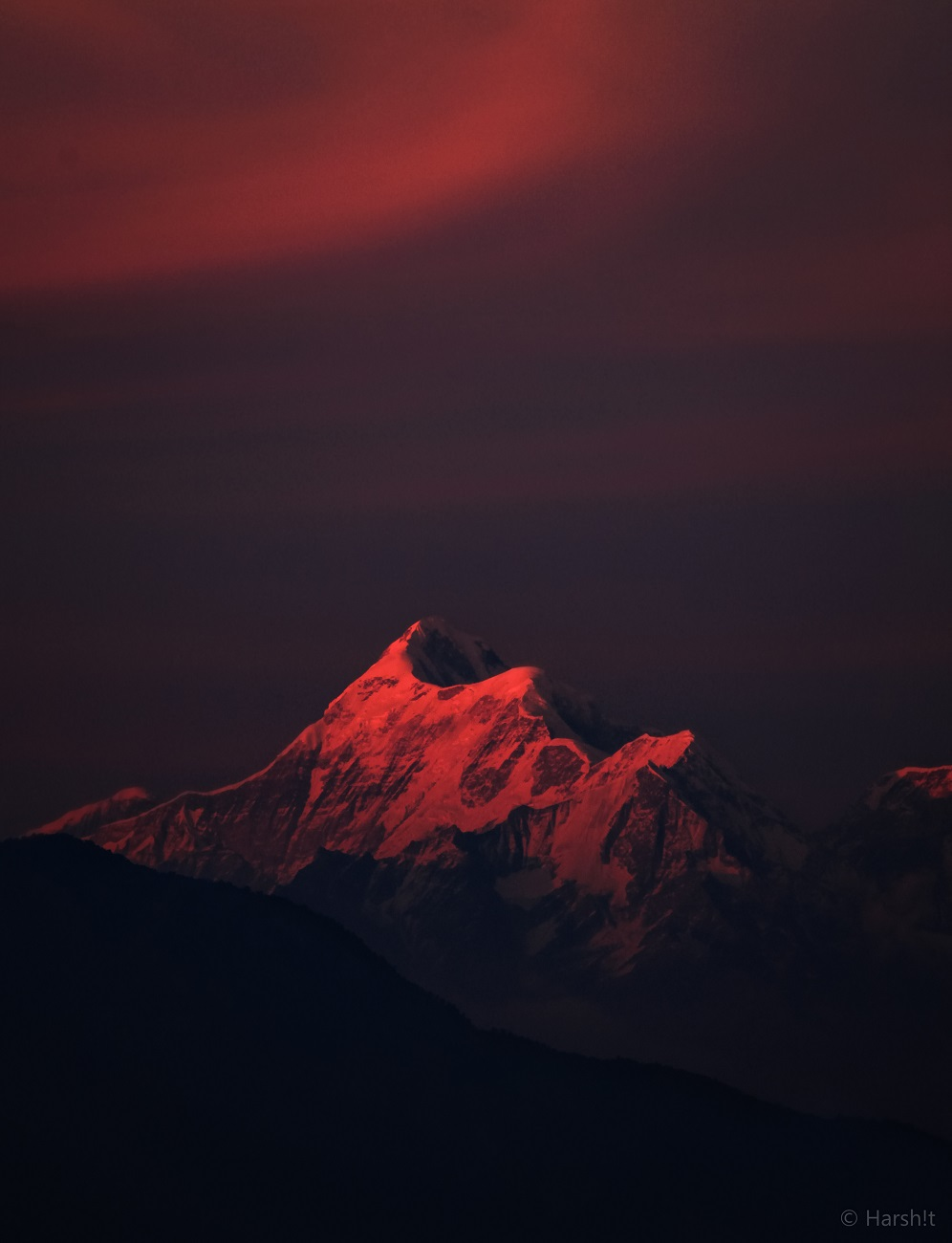
Sunset on Trishul Peak, photographed from Ranikhet, India

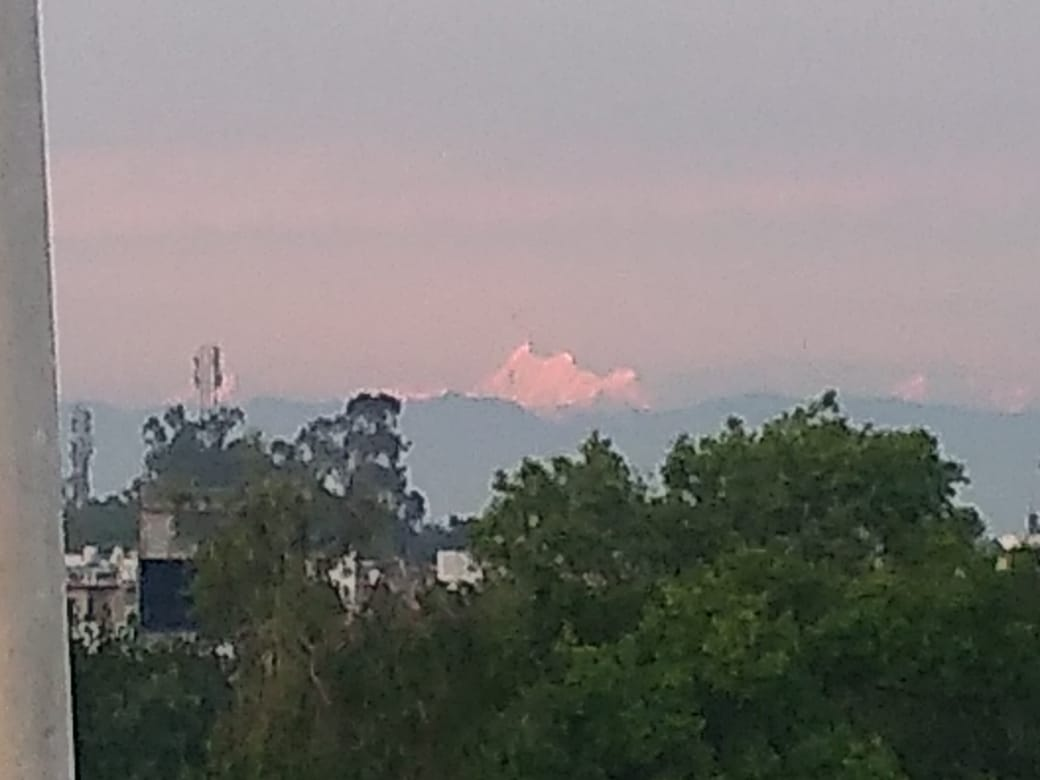
Trisul Peak view from Ratanpur Kalan dist. Moradabad during lockdown on 10 May 2020 I.S.T 6.55 pm. Approx aerial distance of the peak is 216 km.
