= Nanda Devi =

Second-highest mountain in India

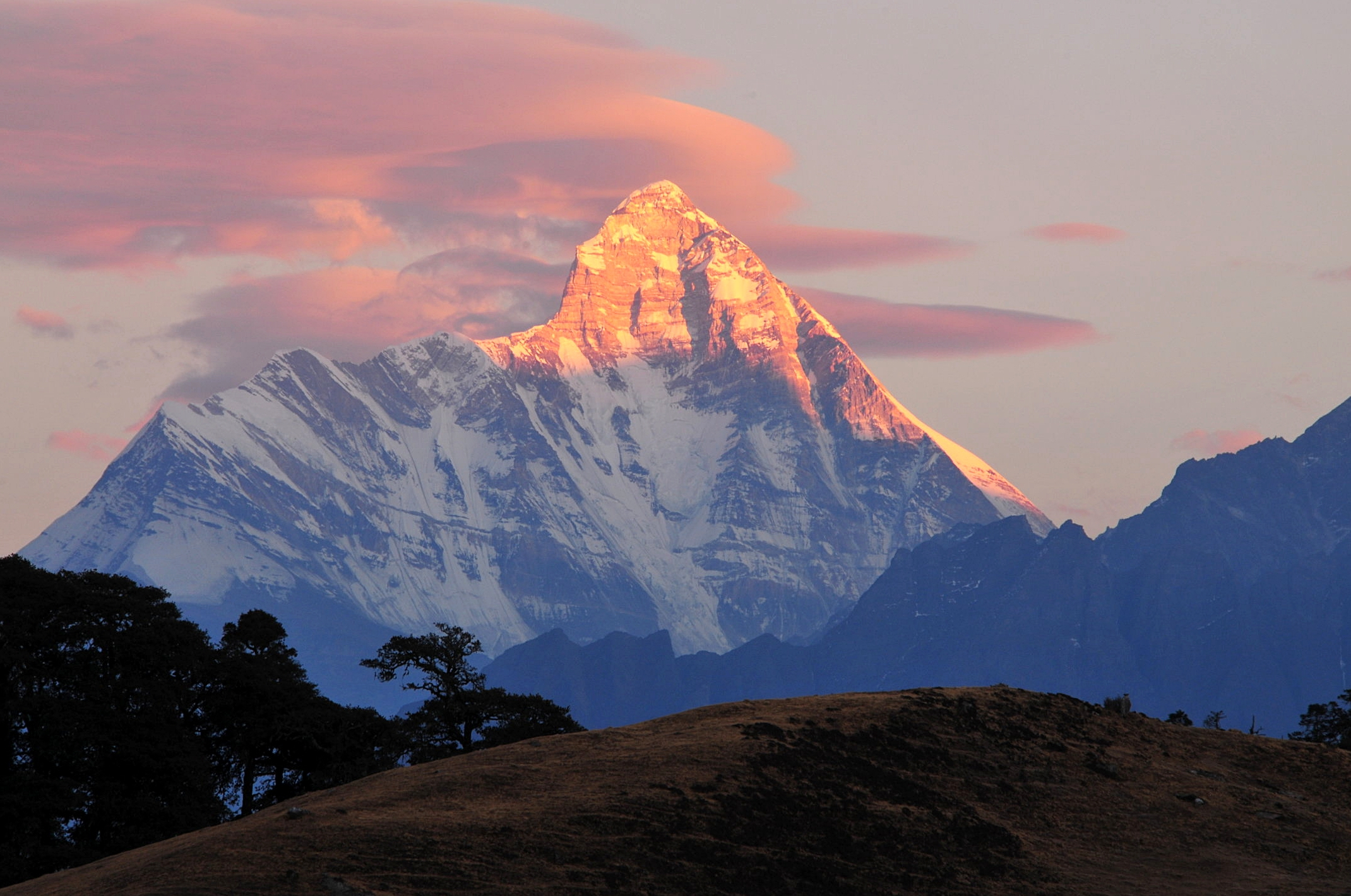

Highest point
- Elevation: 7,817 m (25,646 ft); Ranked 23rd
- Prominence: 3,139 m (10,299 ft); Ranked 74th
- Listing: Indian state high point Ultra
- Coordinates: 30°22′33″N 79°58′15″E

Geography
- The major peaks (not mountains) above 7,500 m (24,600 ft) height in Himalayas, rank identified in Himalayas alone (not the world). Legend: 1：Mount Everest; 2：Kangchenjunga; 3：Lhotse; 4：Yalung Kang, Kanchenjunga West; 5：Makalu; 6：Kangchenjunga South; 7：Kangchenjunga Central; 8：Cho Oyu; 9：Dhaulagiri; 10：Manaslu (Kutang); 11：Nanga Parbat (Diamer); 12：Annapurna; 13：Shishapangma (Shishasbangma, Xixiabangma); 14：Manaslu East; 15：Annapurna East Peak; 16： Gyachung Kang; 17：Annapurna II; 18：Tenzing Peak (Ngojumba Kang, Ngozumpa Kang, Ngojumba Ri); 19：Kangbachen; 20：Himalchuli (Himal Chuli); 21：Ngadi Chuli (Peak 29, Dakura, Dakum, Dunapurna); 22：Nuptse (Nubtse); 23：Nanda Devi; 24：Chomo Lonzo (Chomolonzo, Chomolönzo, Chomo Lönzo, Jomolönzo, Lhamalangcho); 25：Namcha Barwa (Namchabarwa); 26：Zemu Kang (Zemu Gap Peak); 27：Kamet; 28：Dhaulagiri II; 29：Ngojumba Kang II; 30：Dhaulagiri III; 31：Kumbhakarna Mountain (Mount Kumbhakarna, Jannu); 32：Gurla Mandhata (Naimona'nyi, Namu Nan); 33：Hillary Peak (Ngojumba Kang III); 34：Molamenqing (Phola Gangchen); 35：Dhaulagiri IV; 36：Annapurna Fang; 37：Silver Crag; 38：Kangbachen Southwest; 39：Gangkhar Puensum (Gangkar Punsum); 40：Annapurna III; 41：Himalchuli West; 42：Annapurna IV; 43：Kula Kangri; 44：Liankang Kangri (Gangkhar Puensum North, Liangkang Kangri); 45：Ngadi Chuli South; Location in India
- Location: Chamoli, Uttarakhand, India
- Parent range: Garhwal Himalaya

Climbing
- First ascent: 29 August 1936 by Noel Odell and Bill Tilman
- Easiest route: south ridge: technical rock/snow/ice climb

Nanda Devi is the second-highest mountain in India, after Kangchenjunga, and the highest located entirely within the country as Kangchenjunga is on the border of India and Nepal. Nanda Devi is the 23rd-highest peak in the world and ranked 74th by prominence in Chamoli Garhwal district of Uttarakhand, in northern India.

Nanda Devi was considered the highest mountain in the world before computations in 1808 proved Dhaulagiri to be higher. It was also the highest mountain in India until 1975, when Sikkim, an independent kingdom until 1948 and a protectorate of India thereafter, became a state of India. It is located in the Chamoli district of Uttarakhand, between the Rishiganga valley on the west and the Goriganga valley on the east.

The peak, whose name means "Bliss-Giving Goddess", is regarded as the patron goddess of the Garhwal and Kumaon Himalayas. In acknowledgment of its religious significance and for the protection of its fragile ecosystem, the Government of India in 1983 declared the peak as well as the circle of high mountains surrounding it—the Nanda Devi sanctuary—off-limits to both locals and climbers. The surrounding Nanda Devi National Park was declared a UNESCO World Heritage Site in 1988.

== Description and notable features ==
Nanda Devi is a two-peaked massif, forming a 2-kilometre-long (1.2 mi) high ridge, oriented east–west. The western summit is higher than the eastern summit, which is called Nanda Devi East, (locally known as Sunanda Devi). The main summit stands guarded by a barrier ring comprising some of the highest mountains in the Indian Himalayas, twelve of which exceed 6,400 metres (21,000 ft) in height, further elevating its sacred status as the daughter of the Himalaya in Indian folklore. The interior of this almost insurmountable ring is known as the Nanda Devi Sanctuary, and is protected as the Nanda Devi National Park. Nanda Devi East lies on the eastern edge of the ring (and of the park), at the border of Chamoli, Pithoragarh and Bageshwar districts in India's Uttarakhand state.

In addition to being the 23rd highest mountain in the world, Nanda Devi is also notable for its large, steep rise above local terrain. It rises over 3,300 metres (10,800 ft) above its immediate southwestern base on the Dakshini Nanda Devi Glacier in about 4.2 kilometres (2.6 mi), and its rise above the glaciers to the north is similar. This makes it among the steepest peaks in the world at this scale, closely comparable, for example, to the local profile of K2, in Pakistan. Nanda Devi is also impressive when considering terrain that is a bit further away, as it is surrounded by relatively deep valleys. For example, it rises over 6,500 metres (21,300 ft) above the valley of the Goriganga in only 50 km (30 mi).

On the northern side of the massif lies the Uttari Nanda Devi Glacier, flowing into the Uttari Rishi Glacier. To the southwest, one finds the Dakkhini Nanda Devi Glacier, flowing into the Dakkhini Rishi Glacier. All of these glaciers are located within the Sanctuary, and drain west into the Rishiganga. To the east lies the Pachu Glacier, and to the southeast lie the Nandaghunti and Lawan Glaciers, feeding the Lawan Gad; all of these drain into the Milam Valley. To the south is the Pindari Glacier, draining into the Pindar River. Just to the south of Sunanda Devi, dividing the Lawan Gad drainage from the Dakkhini Nanda Devi Glacier, is Longstaff Col, 5,910 m (19,390 ft), one of the high passes that guard access to the Nanda Devi Sanctuary. For a list of notable peaks of the Sanctuary and its environs, see Nanda Devi National Park.

== Exploration and climbing history ==
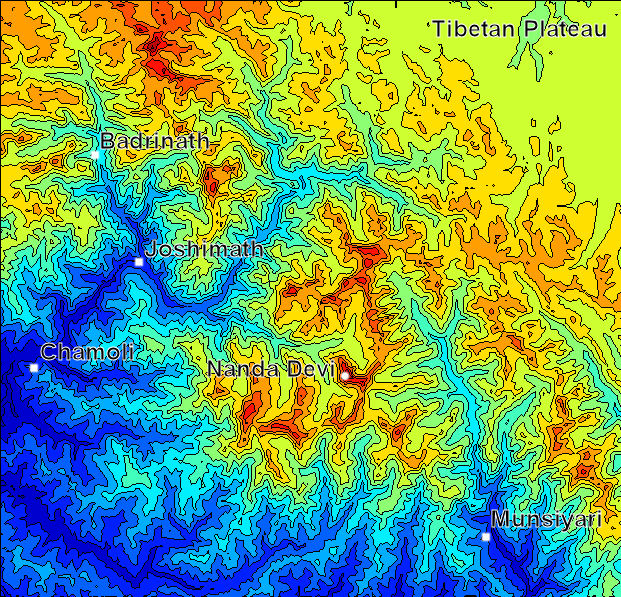
Shaded contour map of Nanda Devi region

The ascent of Nanda Devi necessitated fifty years of arduous exploration in search of a passage into the Sanctuary. The outlet is the Rishi Gorge, a deep, narrow canyon which is very difficult to traverse safely, and is the biggest hindrance to entering the Sanctuary; any other route involves difficult passes, the lowest of which is 5,180 m (16,990 ft). The first recorded attempt to explore the sanctuary was in 1883 by W. W. Graham, who could proceed only up to Rishi Ganga. Hugh Ruttledge attempted to reach the peak three times in the 1930s and failed each time. In a letter to The Times he wrote that 'Nanda Devi imposes on her votaries an admission test as yet beyond their skill and endurance', adding that gaining entry to the Nanda Devi Sanctuary alone was more difficult than reaching the North Pole. In 1934, the British explorers Eric Shipton and H. W. Tilman, with three Sherpa companions, Angtharkay, Pasang and Kusang, finally discovered a way through the Rishi Gorge into the Sanctuary. In 1939, the area was declared as a game sanctuary.

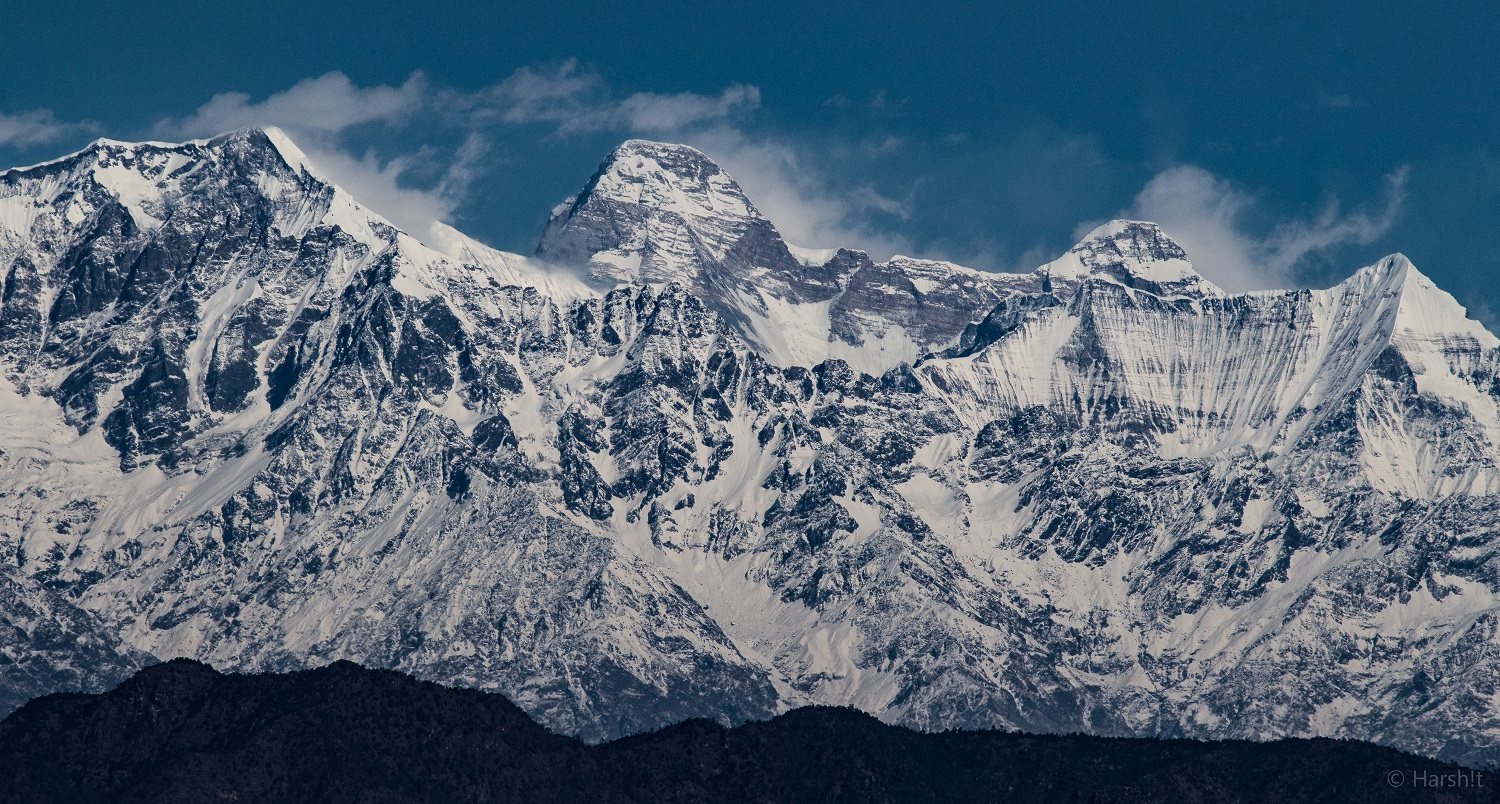
Nanda Devi (center) with Sunanda Devi (on the right), Shot from Ranikhet, Almora

When the mountain was later climbed in 1936 by a British-American expedition, it became the highest peak climbed by man until the 1950 ascent of Annapurna, 8,091 metres (26,545 ft). (However, higher non-summit elevations had already been reached by the British on Mount Everest in the 1920s, and it is possible that George Mallory may have reached Everest's summit in 1924.) It also involved steeper and more sustained terrain than had been previously attempted at such a high altitude. The expedition climbed the south ridge, also known as the Coxcomb Ridge, which leads relatively directly to the main summit. The summit pair were H. W. Tilman and Noel Odell; Charles Houston was to be in place of Tilman, but he contracted severe food poisoning. Noted mountaineer and mountain writer H. Adams Carter was also on the expedition, which was notable for its small scale and lightweight ethic: it included only seven climbers, and used no fixed ropes, nor any Sherpa support above 6,200 m (20,300 ft). Eric Shipton, who was not involved in the climb itself, called it "the finest mountaineering achievement ever performed in the Himalaya."

After abortive attempts by Indian expeditions in 1957 and 1961, the second ascent of Nanda Devi was accomplished by an Indian team led by N. Kumar in 1964, following the Coxcomb route.

=== CIA mission ===
From 1965 to 1968, attempts were made by the Central Intelligence Agency (CIA), in co-operation with the Intelligence Bureau (IB), to place a nuclear-powered (SNAP-19C RTG) telemetry relay listening device on the summit of Nanda Devi. This device was designed to intercept telemetry signals from missile test launches conducted in the Xinjiang Province, at a time of relative infancy in China's missile program. The expedition retreated due to dangerous weather conditions, leaving the device near the summit of Nanda Devi. They returned the next spring to search for the device, which ended without success. As a result of this activity by the CIA, the Sanctuary was closed to foreign expeditions throughout much of the 1960s. In 1974 the Sanctuary re-opened.

=== Subsequent climbs ===
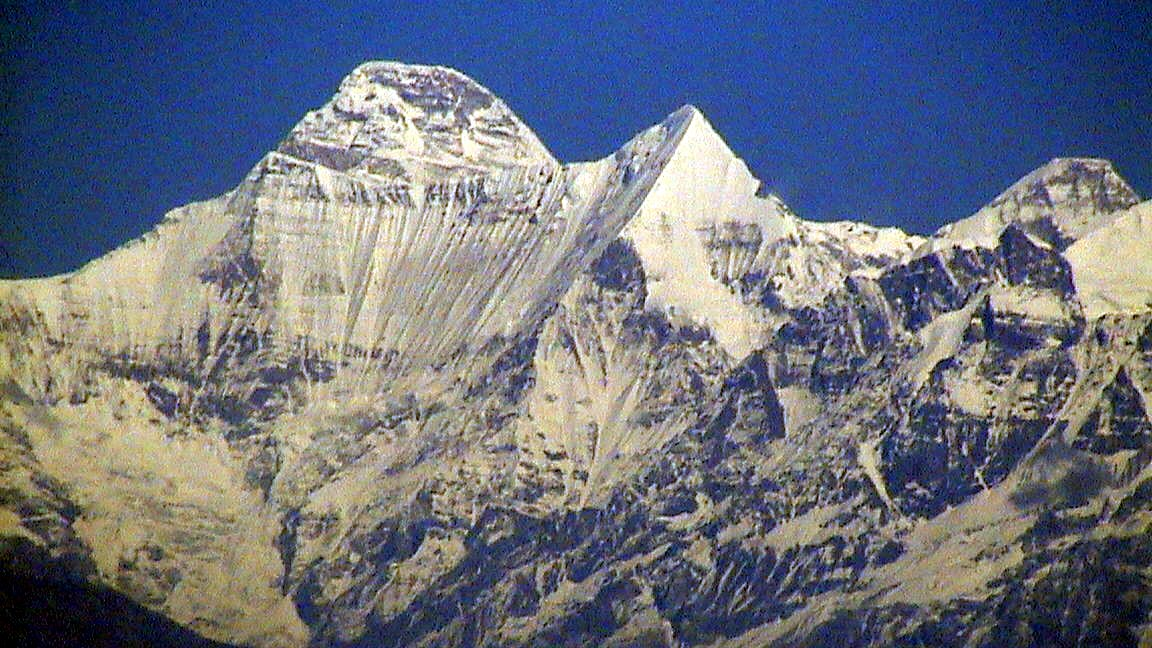
The southwest side of Nanda Devi photographed from Kausani

A difficult new route, the northwest buttress, was climbed by a 13-person team in 1976. Three Americans, John Roskelley, Jim States and Louis Reichardt, summited on 1 September. The expedition was co-led by Reichardt, H. Adams Carter (who was on the 1936 climb,) and Willi Unsoeld, who climbed the West Ridge of Everest in 1963. Unsoeld's daughter, Nanda Devi Unsoeld, who was named after the peak, died on this expedition. She had been suffering from "diarrhea and flare-up of an inguinal hernia, which had shown up originally on the second day of the approach march", and had been at 7,200 metres (23,600 ft) for nearly five days.

In 1980, the Indian Army Corps of Engineers made an unsuccessful attempt.

This was followed in 1981 by another Indian Army expedition of the Parachute Regiment, which attempted both main and eastern peaks simultaneously. The expedition had placed a memorial to Nanda Devi Unsoeld at the high altitude meadow of Sarson Patal prior to the attempt. The successful attempt lost all its summiteers.

In 1993, a 40-member team of the Indian Army from the Corps of Engineers was given special permission. The aim of the expedition was multifold: to carry out an ecological survey, clean up the refuse left behind by previous expeditions, and scale the summit. The team led by Lt Col V.K. Bhatt included a number of wildlife scientists and ecologists from Wildlife Institute of India, Salim Ali Centre for Ornithology and Natural History, World Wide Fund for Nature and Govind Ballabh Pant Institute for Himalayan Environment and Development amongst others. The expedition carried out a comprehensive ecological survey and removed from the park, by porter and helicopter, over 1,000 kilogrammes of litter. Additionally, five summiteers reached the summit: Amin Naik, Anand Swaroop, G. K. Sharma, Didar Singh and S. P. Bhatt.

== Recent history and conservation ==
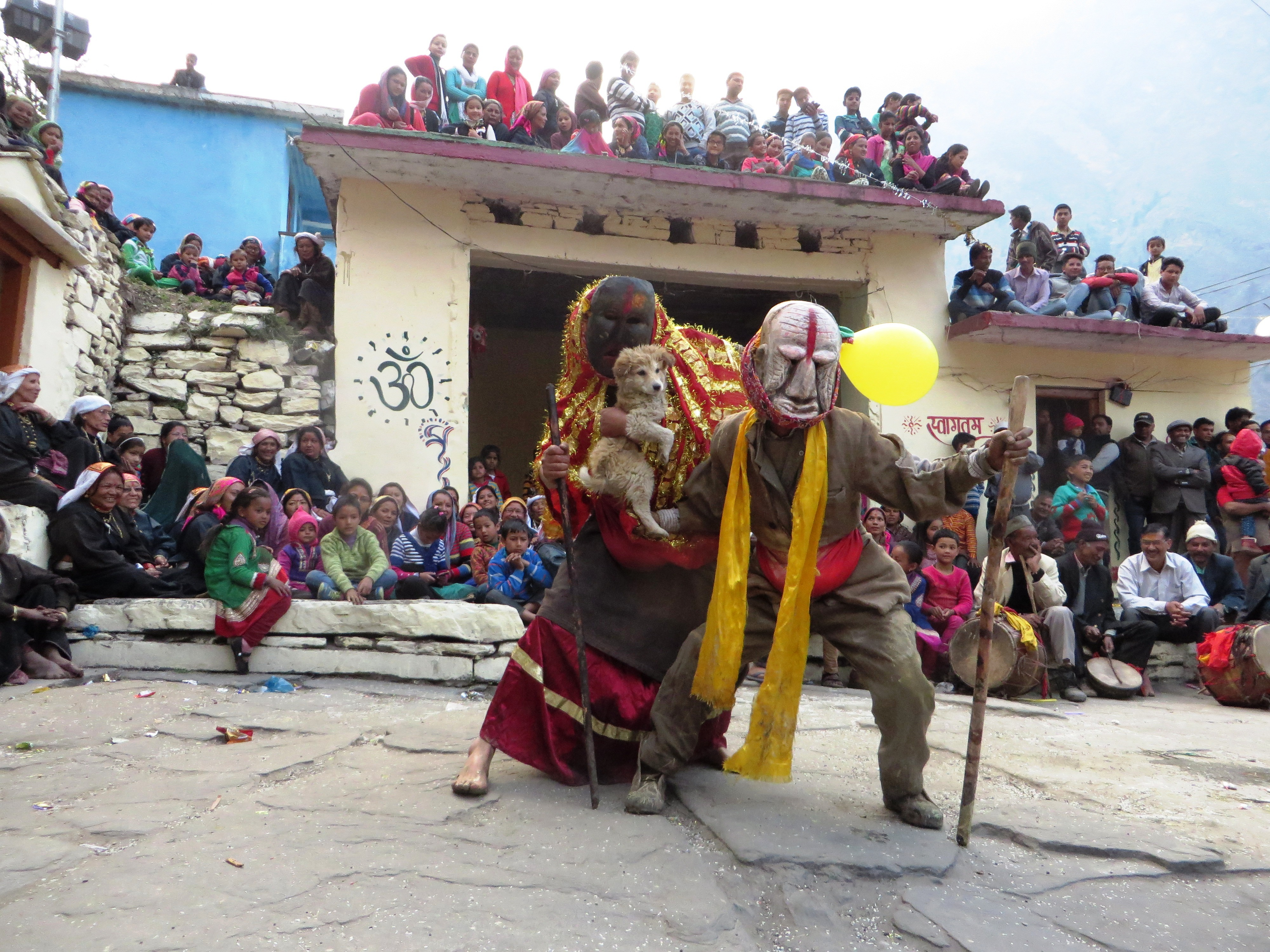
Mask Dance in lata village, the gateway to Nanda Devi National Park

After the re-opening of the sanctuary in 1974 to foreign climbers, trekkers and locals, the fragile ecosystem was soon compromised by firewood cutting, littering and grazing. Serious environmental problems were noted as early as 1977, and the sanctuary was closed again in 1983. Currently, Nanda Devi forms the core of the Nanda Devi Biosphere Reserve (which includes Nanda Devi National Park), declared by the Indian government in 1982. In 1988, Nanda Devi National Park was declared a UNESCO World Heritage Site, "of outstanding cultural or natural importance to the common heritage of humankind." The entire sanctuary, and hence the main summit (and interior approaches to the nearby peaks), are off-limits to locals and to climbing expeditions, although a one-time exception was made in 1993 for a 40-member team from the Indian Army Corps of Engineers to check the state of recovery and to remove garbage left by prior expeditions. Sunanda Devi remains open from the east side, leading to the standard south ridge route. After a sustained campaign by the local community as reflected in the Nanda Devi Declaration of 2001, the core zone of the Nanda Devi was opened for limited eco-tourism activity in 2003. In 2006, the campaign invited women trekkers from 4 countries during the inaugural trek inside the National Park. As a follow-up, the Campaign for Cultural Survival and Sustainable Livelihoods has now designed an Interpretive Trek to the Nanda Devi National Park. An Interpretation Centre on Bio Cultural Diversity of the Nanda Devi National Park is under development in the village of Lata, the gateway to the Nanda Devi National Park. A maximum number of 500 trekkers are now allowed to enter the core zone until Dharansi between May and October. The trek to Nanda Devi National Park starts from the village of Lata, located 25 kilometres upstream from the town of Joshimath on Niti-Malari highway.

In June 2019, a group of eight climbers were killed in an avalanche while attempting to climb a previously unclimbed subpeak of Nanda Devi.

== 2021 flood ==
On 7 February 2021 it was reported that a portion of the Nanda Devi glacier broke away, causing the Dhauliganga and the Rishiganga rivers to flood. One dam at the Dhauliganga hydropower project at Reni village was destroyed and another suffered a partial collapse. Initial reports said nine people were dead and 140 missing. Water levels on the Alaknanda also rose.

== Gallery ==
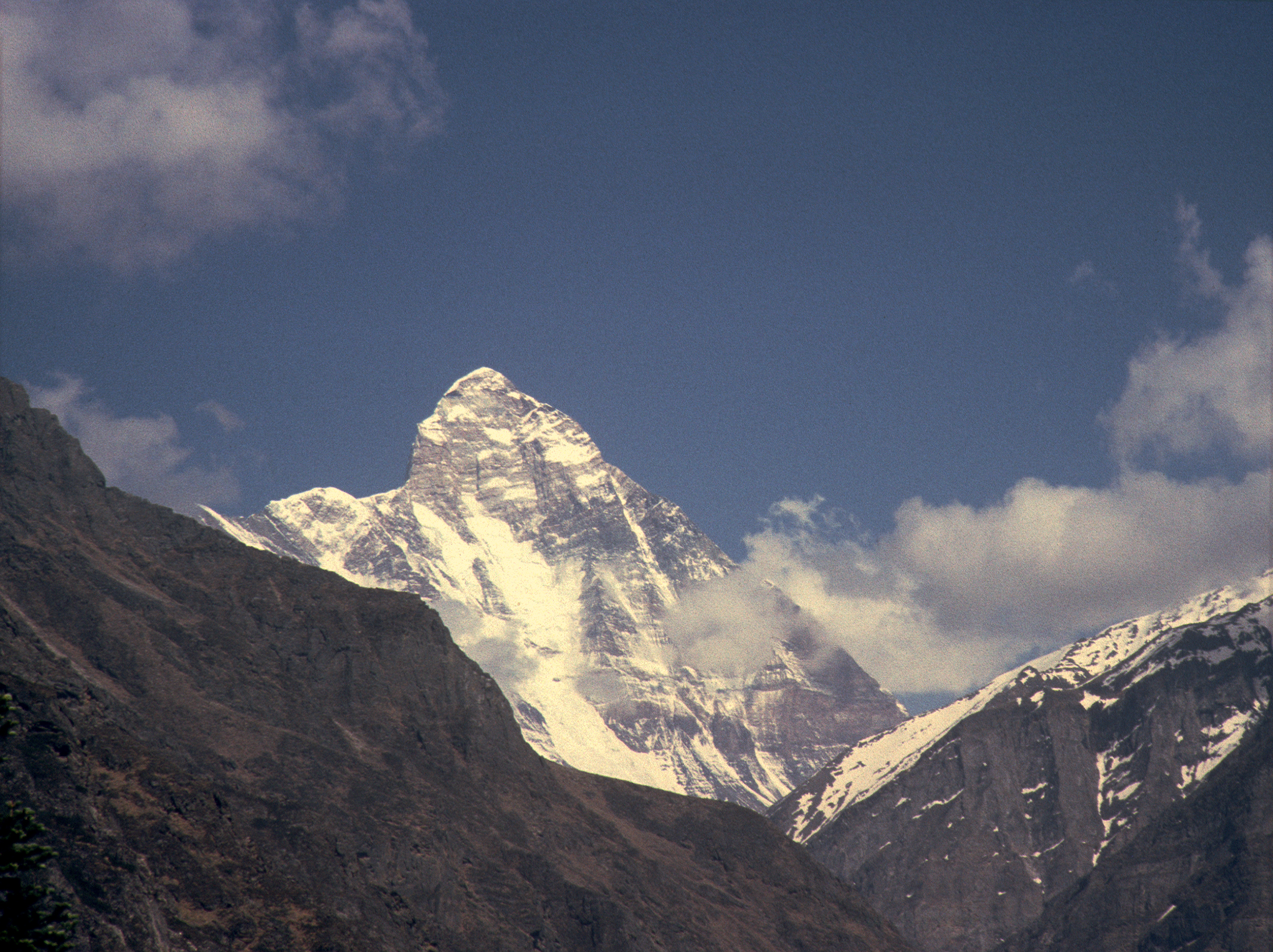
Nanda Devi peak view from the west near Deodi camp in Rishi Ganga gorge

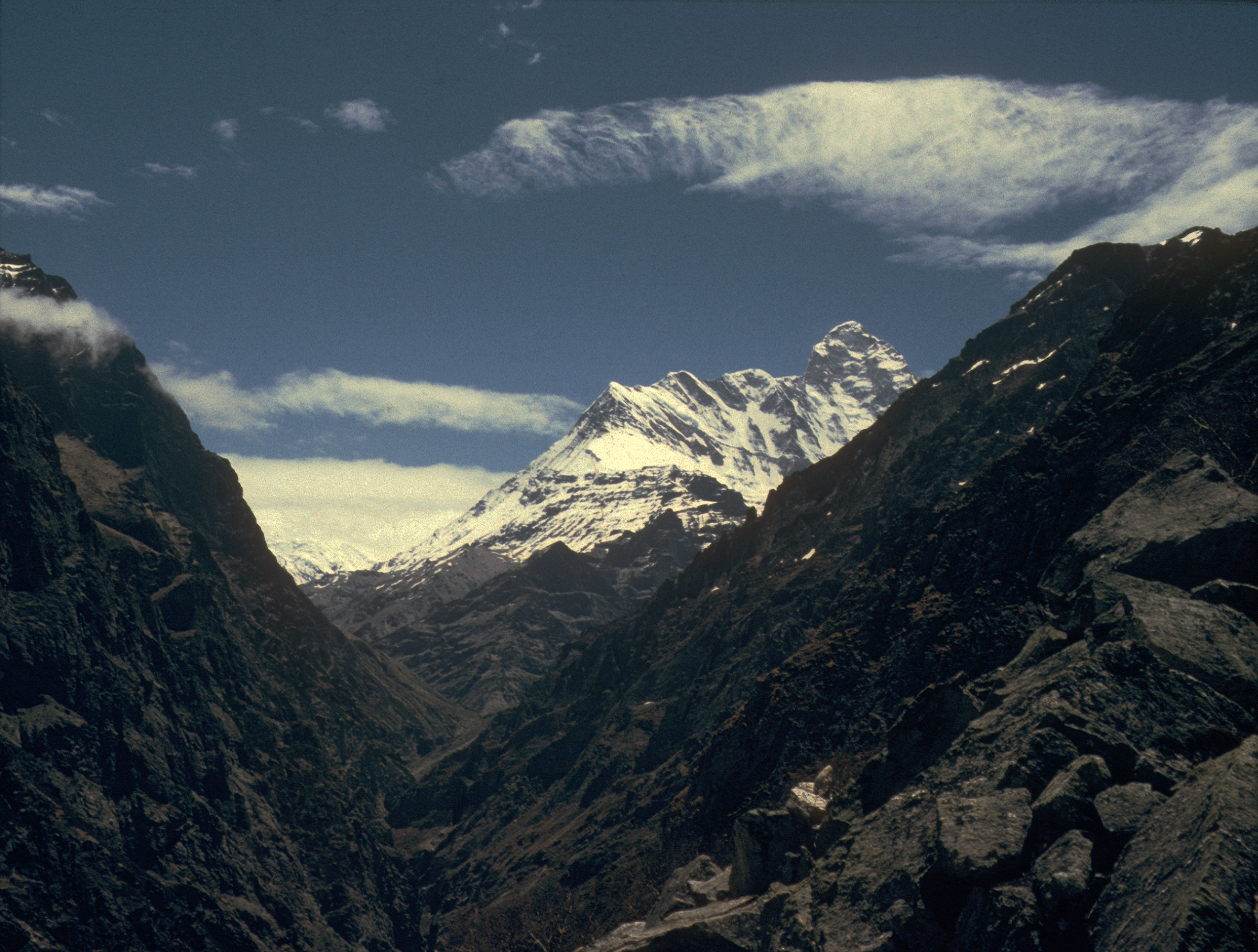
Nanda Devi peak view from outer Sanctuary near Bujgara

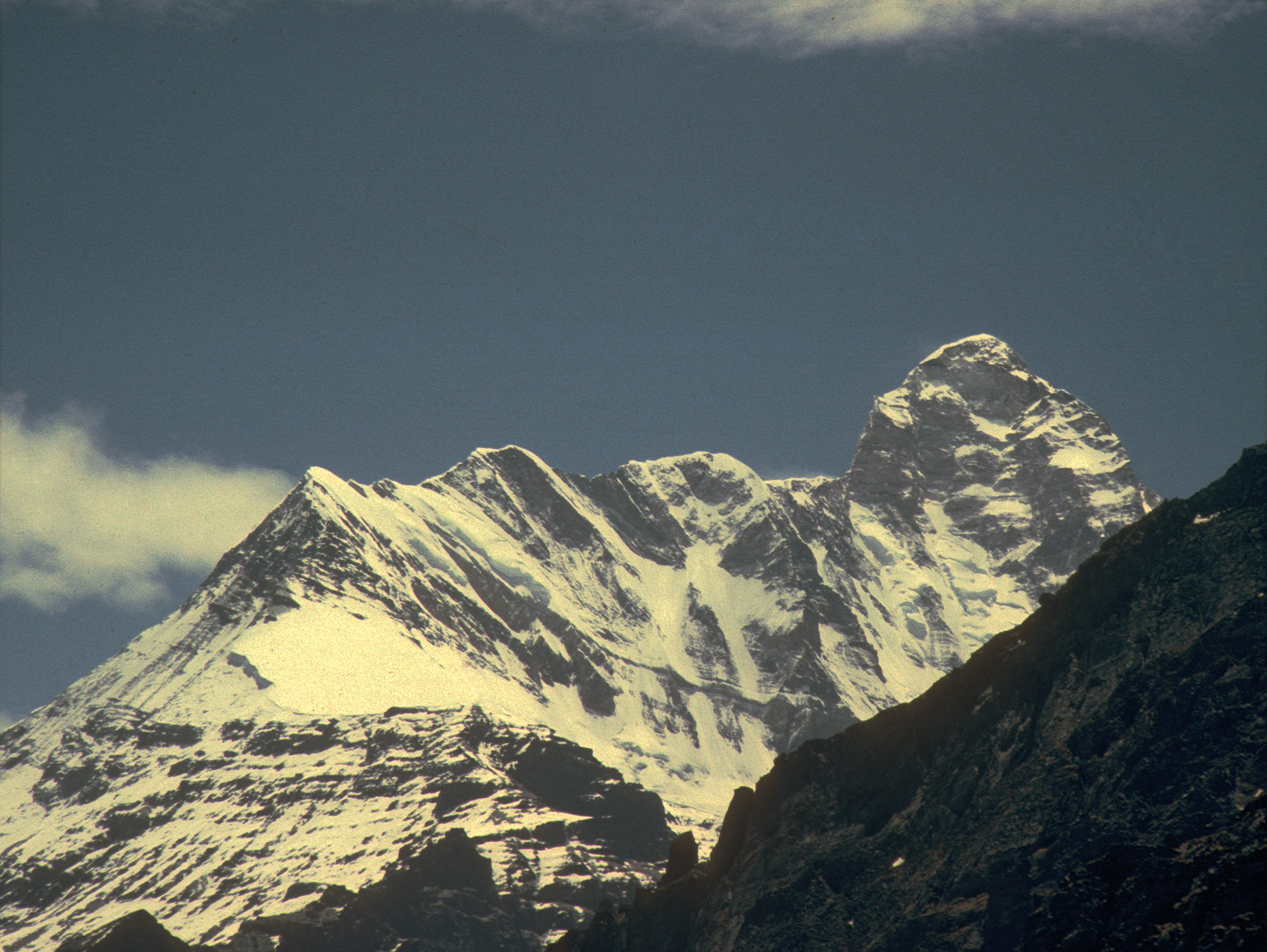
Nanda Devi peak view from outer Sanctuary near Bujgara closeup

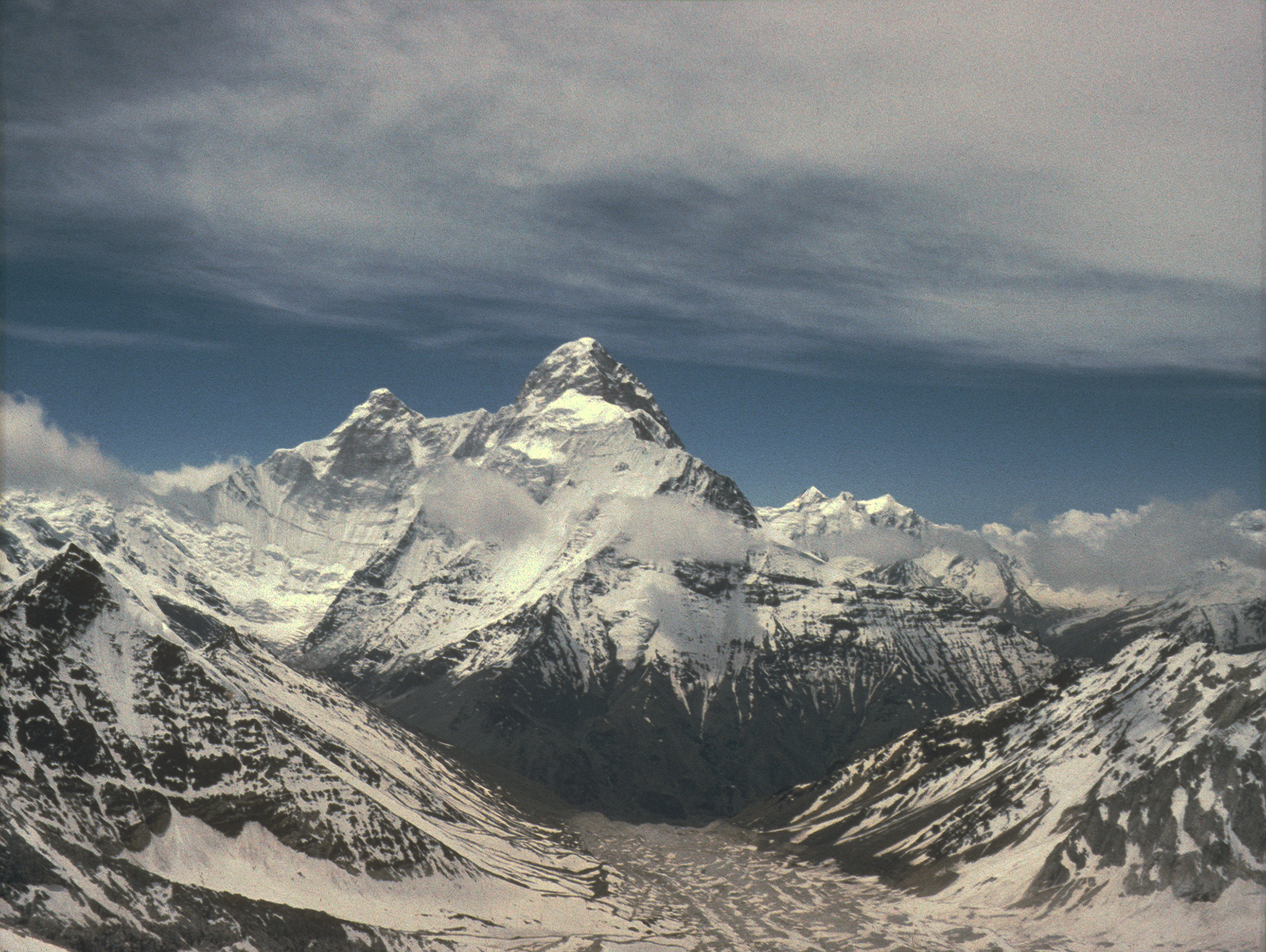
Nanda Devi peaks wide view SE from slopes of Kalanka in Changabang Gal

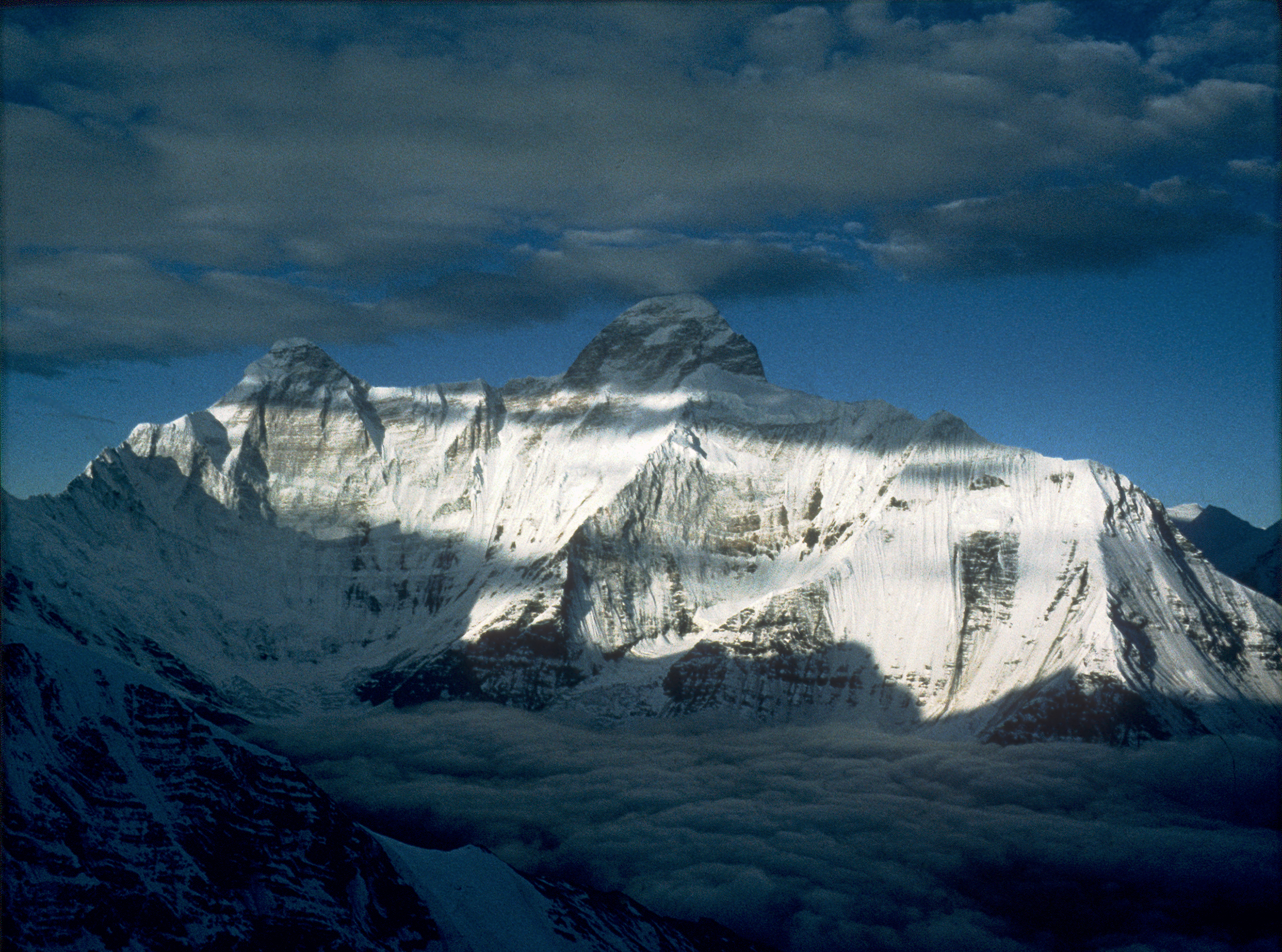
Nanda Devi peak N face view from slopes of Deo Damla

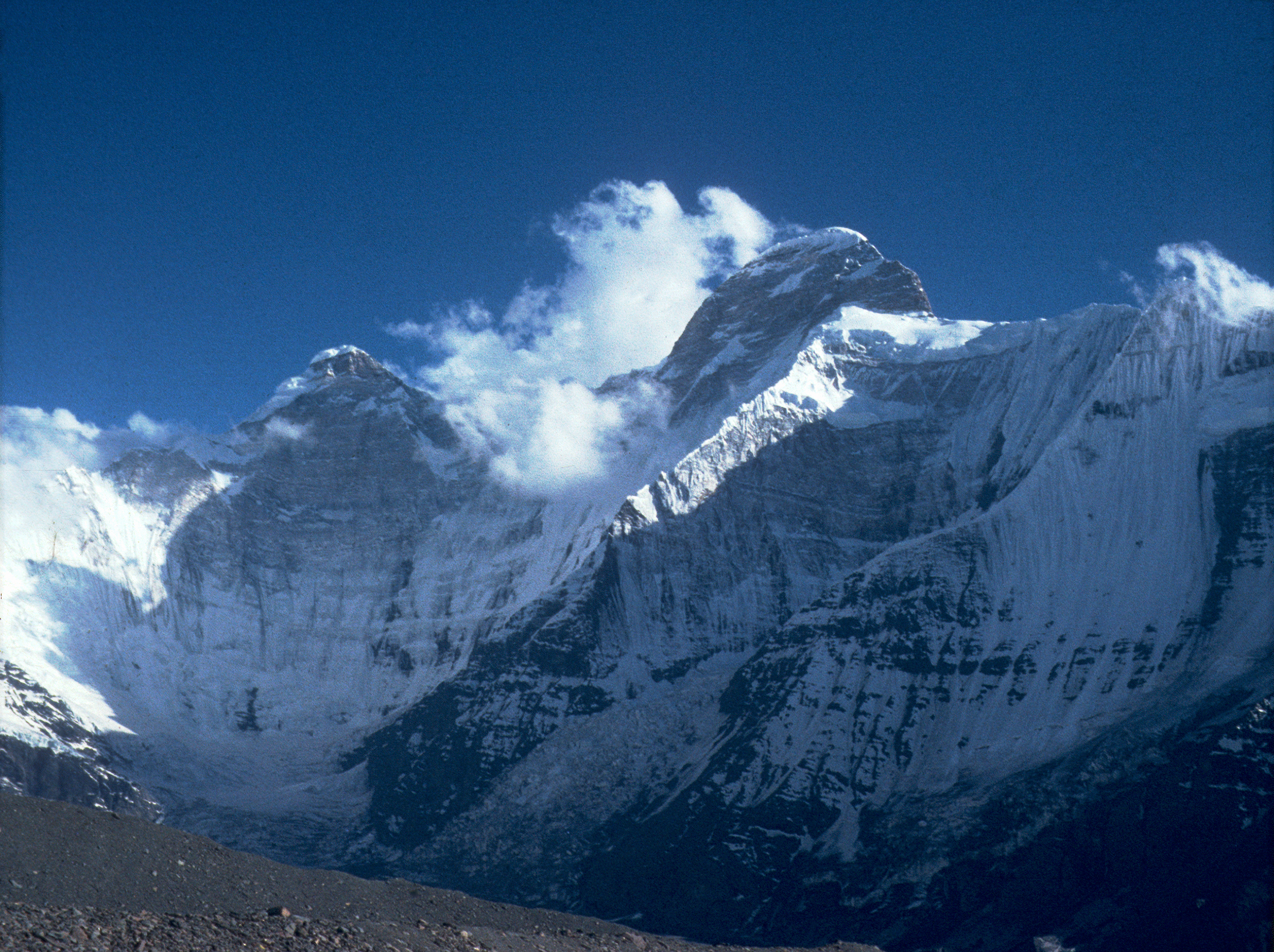
Nanda Devi north face viewed from Deo Damla approach valley

== See also ==
- Sacred mountains of India
- List of ultras of the Himalayas

== Books ==
- Aitken, Bill. (reprinted 1994). The Nanda Devi Affair, Penguin Books India. ISBN 0-14-024045-4.
- Kohli, M.S. & Conboy, K. (2003). Spies in the Himalayas: Secret Missions and Perilous Climbs, University Press of Kansas. ISBN 0-7006-1223-8.
- Jose, Vinod (2010). River Deep, Mountain High, The Caravan Magazine.
- Malhotra, Ashok (2011) Nude Besides the Lake, Createspace ISBN 978-1463529390
- Roskelley, John. (2000). Nanda Devi: The Tragic Expedition, The Mountaineers Books. ISBN 0-89886-739-8 .
- Sanan, Deepak. (1995) Nandadevi – Restoring Glory – New Age International (Wiley Eastern Ltd), New Delhi. ISBN 81-224-0752-8.
- Shipton, E., Tilman, H.W. & Houston, C. (Reprinted 2000). Nanda Devi:Exploration and Ascent, The Mountaineers Books. ISBN 0-89886-721-5.
- Sircar, J. (1979) Himalayan Handbook, (private pub., Calcutta).
- Takeda, Peter. (2006) An Eye at the Top of the World: The Terrifying Legacy of the Cold War's Most Daring C.I.A. Operation, Thunder's Mouth Press. ISBN 1-56025-845-4.
- Thomson, Hugh (2004) Nanda Devi: A Journey to the Last Sanctuary, Weidenfeld & Nicolson ISBN 0-297-60753-7
- Tilman, H. W., The Ascent of Nanda Devi, Cambridge University Press. 1937.
