= Lhakpa Chedi =

Nepali mountaineer

- Born: 1903; Darjeeling, India

Lhakpa Chedi (also spelt Llakpa Chedi, Llakpa Chédé, Lhakpa Chédi and Lhakpa Chhedi) was known for his contribution to both the 1924 British Mount Everest expedition and the 1933 British Mount Everest expedition. He also featured in the silent film The Epic of Everest, which John Noel made during the 1924 expedition. His 'Himalayan Club Number' was 34.

== Early life ==
Lhakpa Chedi was born in 1903 in Darjeeling, he was of Sherpa descent, his father having been born in Khumbu.

== 1924 Everest expedition ==
In 1924, he was one of the three porters who carried loads to the high camp (Camp VI) at 26,800 ft (8,200 m) for the summit attempt by Norton and Somervell. In doing this they passed "by 1,500', the highest point to which loads had ever been carried".

When Norton and Somervell climbed from 25,000 ft (7,600 m) to Everest's Camp V on 2 June 1924 they were accompanied by 6 porters. Two of those porters descended on the same day, the four others, Lhakpa Chedi, Nurbu (sic) Yishi, Lobsang Tashi and Semchumbi, stayed overnight with Norton & Somervell at Camp V. The following day Norton "turned on his eloquence for a good long time in attempts to rouse, inspire, enthuse and, generally speaking, persuade the porters to get a move on". He was not able to persuade Lobsang Tashi but the other three porters, including Semchumbi, who had been injured by rockfall during the night, continued up the mountain and carried the 50 pound load to Camp VI - the highest altitude on any mountain to which loads had ever been carried (and without using supplemental oxygen). Somervell wrote that "our start even then was due entirely to one man, Lhakpa Chédi, stoutest-hearted of our porters, without whose lead it is probable that the other three would have refused to go on".

The Everest veteran Stephen Venables has written that Norton and Somervell "would never have established their Camp VI at an incredible 26,800 feet" without "the great efforts" of Norbu Yishang, Lhakpa Chedi and Semchumbi. His caption for Noel's photograph of Norton and Somervell with Lhakpa Chedi, Norbu Yishang, Lobsang Tashi reads that "The Sherpas look proud and fit, seemingly unaffected by their efforts. The two sahibs look more drawn, but still with strength in reserve."

The porters who went highest on Everest in 1924. Lhakpa Chedi second from right, the others (left to right): Bom, Narboo Yishay, Semchumbi, Lobsang , Lhakpa Chedi, Angtenjin

Francis Younghusband, who was the Chairman of the Mount Everest Committee during the course of the 1921, 1922 and 1924 British expeditions, wrote that "Without doubt, then, one day man will conquer the mountain. But in that great day he who first stands on the summit, with the whole mountain beneath his feet, will be the surest to feel and quickest to acknowledge what he owes to those pioneers who made his victory possible. His name it may be which will go down to posterity as having first climbed the highest mountain in the world. But with it should ever be associated the names of Mallory and Irvine, of Norton, Somervell and Odell, and also of Napboo Yishay, Lhakpa Chedi, and Semchumbi, those stout-hearted and sturdy-bodied porters who first showed that a camp could be carried to within reach of the summit."

The 1924 expedition took place before the Himalayan Club initiated the Tiger Badge but it was on this expedition that the term 'tiger' was first used for "the picked fifteen porters on whom now all our hopes centred", Lhakpa Chedi was one of that group.

=== In film and photographs ===
Lhakpa Chedi is featured in the silent film The Epic of Everest, made by John Noel during the 1924 expedition. Norton wrote that "Llakpa Chédé will be familiar in person to all who have seen "The Epic of Everest" film at the Scala Theatre - probably giving the impression of a very small, shy and frightened-looking man." (Note: As part of a publicity stunt, a group of Tibetan monks and a Sherpa porter accompanied Noel at screenings of the film. Rand, in 1954, referred to "Lhakpa Chedi, who was taken to England and France and fêted", but press reports at the time named Lhakpa Tsering as the Sherpa taken to London and also mention that he was "one of the three porters who built Mallory's last camp, 27,000ft. up Everest", a more detailed study states that "The one Sherpa brought to London, Lhakpa-Tsering, was a 'Tibetan Napoleon-porter-and-man-of-all-work [and] one of the three porters who last saw Mallory and Irvine alive'". Norton mentions a porter named Lhakpa Tsering who was employed by the British Everest expeditions in both 1922 and 1924, and that he climbed at least as high as Camp IV, he also mentions 'Llakpa Chédé', "who in 1922 had done his best to come, but was at that time very ill with malaria". The name Lhakpa or Lakpa has the Tibetan meaning 'born on Wednesday' so is not uncommon. The similarity in these two names and the variations in their spellings may have led to anomalies in other accounts, for example, one commentator wrote that Lhakpa Chedi was one of the four porters who carried loads up to Camp VI at 27,000 ft (8,200 m), the highest camp used by Mallory and Irvine when they made their fateful last attempt on Everest's summit. Eight porters had carried loads up to that camp, four descended on the same day. The other four remained there overnight and when they descended from Camp VI, on 7 June 1924, they carried notes from Mallory to Odell and to Noel - his "last messages to the outside world". Venables names the porter carrying the notes as "Sherpa Lhakpa". Noel, who received one of the notes, wrote that Lakpa "brought me the note (from Mallory) and was one of the few porters to attain 27,000 feet", on the same page, in a footnote to that sentence, he writes that "He came back with me to Europe afterwards and stayed ten months, appearing at the Scala Theatre, London, where the film “The Epic of Everest’’ was shown, and toured England, Ireland, Scotland, France and Germany, together with the seven Tibetan lamas from a monastery in the interior of Tibet, whom I also brought back to appear in connection with the presentation of the film.") Noel's photograph of Norton and Somervell with Lhakpa Chedi, Norbu Yishang, Lobsang Tashi, the three porters who established Camp VI at 26,800 feet in 1924 is reproduced in Stephen Venables's Everest: Summit of Achievement.

=== Working with General Bruce ===
General Charles Bruce, who led the 1922 British Mount Everest expedition, recounted that Llakpa Chédé (sic) tried to join that expedition. Bruce wrote that his "former porter and henchman" was not accepted because he was very ill with malaria at the time. Bruce was also appointed as the leader of the 1924 British Mount Everest expedition but during the approach march he fell ill. At that point the expedition's leadership was relinquished to Norton and it was Lhakpa Chedi who carried Bruce 20 miles down the trail they had travelled, back to the settlement of Phari.

Bruce later encouraged Frank Smythe to recruit Lhakpa Chedi to join him as a "personal servant" for the international expedition to Kangchenjunga in 1930 but he was then working as a waiter in Darjeeling.

== 1933 Everest expedition and after ==
When the support team for the 1933 British expedition were being recruited in Darjeeling, Lhakpa Chedi was working in the town as a waiter. He joined the party as sardar and head mess-man but "made no secret of his intention to go as high as anyone", and during the expedition "his influence over the men was very great".

On the 1933 expedition, he was among the porters selected for carrying loads to Camp VI at 27,400 ft (8,400 m) although, because of the injuries he sustained, he didn't climb above Camp V at 25,700 ft (7,800 m). On 23 May Frank Smythe and Eric Shipton had reached that Camp V with Lhakpa Chedi and several other porters but high winds on 24 May kept everyone in the tents. The following day several porters were affected by frostbitten fingers whilst arranging loads to be carried on to Camp VI and in the face of the conditions everyone at Camp V descended. When the party reached lower levels it transpired that all of the porters who had overnighted at Camp V were suffering from some degree of frotsbite. Pasang and Lhakpa Chedi were most seriously affected, Lhakpa Chedi's injuries later led to the loss of two fingers and Pasang lost one finger.

In his account of the 1936 British Mount Everest expedition the leader, Ruttledge, wrote that "In our Mess we sadly missed the services of Lhakpa Chhedi, the "tiger" of 1924 and head messman of 1933. I didn't take him this year because he had lost some fingers from frost-bite and was getting on in years."

By 1954, he was working a doorman for a store in Calcutta.
