= Joint Himalayan Committee =

Mountain climbing committee

The Mount Everest Committee was a body formed by the Alpine Club and the Royal Geographical Society to co-ordinate and finance the 1921 British Mount Everest reconnaissance expedition to Mount Everest and all subsequent British expeditions to climb the mountain until 1947. It was then renamed the Joint Himalayan Committee; this latter committee organised and financed the first successful ascent of Mount Everest in 1953.

== Formation ==
Although Mount Everest as a mountaineering objective had been on the horizon of British alpinists for some time – Clinton Thomas Dent writing in 1885, had sketched the idea of an ascent and Dr A. M. Kellas's study 'A Consideration of the Possibility of Ascending the Loftier Himalaya' of 1916 had asserted that it was certainly possible physiologically – the initiative to form the Mount Everest Committee came from a talk given to the Royal Geographical Society in 1919 by Captain John Noel about his travels in the Everest region, and the resultant discussion.

In 1920, at the behest of Sir Francis Younghusband (the first chairman of the committee), Colonel Charles Howard-Bury – the leader of the 1921 expedition – persuaded Sir Charles Bell to use his considerable influence with Tibetan officials to negotiate permission for a passage to Mount Everest from the northern side (the Nepalese approaches from the south were closed to foreign entry). Permission was granted by the Tibetan government for the British to proceed in the following year, 1921.

To co-ordinate and finance the reconnaissance expedition, a joint body – the Mount Everest Committee – was formed, composed of high-ranking members of the two interested parties – the Alpine Club and the Royal Geographical Society.

According to Sir Francis Younghusband:

Diplomacy having achieved its object and human obstacles being overcome it was possible to go full steam ahead organizing an Expedition. And climbing Mount Everest was a matter which interested both the Royal Geographical Society and the Alpine Club. It interested the former because the Society will not admit that there is any spot on the earth's surface on which British man should not at least try to set his foot. And it interested the latter because climbing mountains is their especial province. It was decided, therefore, to make the Expedition a joint effort of the two societies. And this was the more desirable because the Geographical Society had greater facilities for organizing exploring expeditions, while the Alpine Club had better means of choosing the personnel. A joint Committee, called the Mount Everest Committee, was therefore formed, composed of three members each of the two societies. And it was arranged that during the first phase, while the mountain was being reconnoitred, the President of the Royal Geographical Society should be chairman; and in the second phase, when the mountain was to be climbed, the President of the Alpine Club should preside.

— .

The first serious attempt on the summit was on the 1922 expedition. However, a diplomatic debacle after the 1924 expedition, later known as the Affair of the Dancing Lamas led to expeditions being banned until 1933. The embarrassment to the committee was so great that the affair was covered up for over fifty years.

== Original members ==
- Sir Francis Younghusband (Chairman, retired from the committee in 1934) (President, Royal Geographical Society)
- Edward Somers-Cocks (Royal Geographical Society)
- Colonel E.M. Jack (Royal Geographical Society)
- Professor John Norman Collie (President, Alpine Club)
- Captain John Percy Farrar (Ex-president, Alpine Club)
- Charles Francis Meade (Alpine Club)
- Mr John Edward Caldwell Eaton and Mr Arthur Robert Hinks (Honorary Secretaries)

== As reconstituted in May 1934 ==
- Sir Percy Cox (Chairman) (President, Royal Geographical Society)
- Kenneth Mason, who had been Superintendent of the Survey of India, a founding member of The Himalayan Club and, from 1932, professor of Geography at the University of Oxford
- L.R. Wager, who had been a member of the 1933 expedition
- Colonel Strutt, representing the Alpine Club
- Hugh Ruttledge, who had been the leader of the 1933 British Mount Everest expedition and the 1936 British Mount Everest expedition
- Colin Crawford, who had been a member of the 1922 British Mount Everest expedition and the 1933 British Mount Everest expedition
- Sir Geoffrey Corbett, representing the Himalayan Club
- Arthur Hinks (joint Honorary Secretary)
- Sydney Spencer (joint Honorary Secretary)

== Subsequent members ==
- Sir William Goodenough (Chairman from 1931) (President, Royal Geographical Society 1930-33)
- Sir Claude Elliott (Chairman in run up to the successful 1953 British Mount Everest expedition and President of the Alpine Club 1950-52)
- Robert Wylie Lloyd (Treasurer)
- L. P. Kirwan (Director, Royal Geographical Society)
- Peter Lloyd (a member of the 1938 British Mount Everest expedition)
- Basil R. Goodfellow (Honorary Secretary)

== 1953 Everest expedition ==
=== Background ===
The committee began the organisation for the full-scale 1953 attempt (in case the Swiss attempt in 1952 failed) in 1951, when it arranged the 1951 reconnaissance expedition.

In 1952, the following year, the Cho Oyu expedition was undertaken, which was also to test oxygen apparatus for 1953. But Cho Oyu was not climbed. Members included Edmund Hillary. Hunt had asked earlier Everest climbers for comments on his 1953 plans; Teddy Norton advised him that previous assault camps had been too low, and that in 1953 it should be on or very close under the Southern Summit.

=== Selecting members ===
John Hunt, the leader of the 1953 expedition, decided to recruit British and Commonwealth members (New Zealand and Kenya had potential members) rather than an "international" team, and the two New Zealand members not known to Hunt (Hillary and Lowe) were known to Shipton and others. He wanted climbers experienced in snow and ice (not rock climbers) and between 25 and 40 (although Band was 23 and Hunt himself was 42). A "large" party of ten was required, plus an expedition doctor; so Ward (doctor), Pugh (physiologist, sponsored by the Medical Research Council) and Stobart (cameraman, sponsored by Countryman Films) were added. A few months later Tenzing was invited to join the climbing party.

There were five reserve mountaineers also prepared to assist the expedition: J. H. Emlyn Jones, John Jackson, Anthony Rawlinson, Hamish Nicol and Jack Tucker. The various British mountaineering clubs had been requested to submit lists of qualified candidates to be considered by the committee, "whose responsibility it was to issue the formal invitations".

=== Financing ===
According to Hunt, the committee's responsibility for drumming up funds for the 1953 expedition was not a welcome one:

One of the principal tasks of the Joint Himalayan Committee in addition to those of conceiving the idea of an Everest expedition, seeking political sanction, deciding matters of policy in preparation, is to finance it. Only those who have had this care can fully appreciate the work and anxiety of raising very substantial funds for an enterprise of this nature, coloured as it inevitably is in the mind of the public by a succession of failures, with no financial security other than the pockets of the Committee members themselves.

—

A number of organisations contributed to the committee, including The Times newspaper, which had also supported earlier expeditions.

=== Success ===
On 2 June, four days after the successful ascent, Hunt sent a runner to 'carry messages to Namche Bazar, to go thence by the good offices of the Indian wireless station to Kathmandu. Cables of humble appreciation were sent to the Queen and the Prime Minister, another to the Himalayan Committee saying that I proposed to bring Tenzing and Hillary to England – George Lowe had already planned to come.'
