= British Everest Expedition =

The British Mount Everest Expedition can refer to one of three expeditions organised by the Mount Everest Committee or its successor the Joint Himalayan Committee with the aim of making the first ascent of Mount Everest.

- British Mount Everest Expedition 1922
- British Mount Everest Expedition 1924
- British Mount Everest Expedition 1953
