= Lawrence Wager =

British geologist, explorer and mountaineer (1904–1965)

- Born: Lawrence Rickard Wager; 5 February 1904; Batley, Yorkshire
- Died: 20 November 1965 (aged 61); London, England
- Resting place: Littondale, Yorkshire
- Awards: Bigsby Medal (1945); Lyell Medal (1962); Fellow of the Royal Society
- Scientific career
- Academic advisors: W. B. R. King

Lawrence Rickard Wager, commonly known as Bill Wager, (5 February 1904 – 20 November 1965) was a British geologist, explorer and mountaineer, described as "one of the finest geological thinkers of his generation" and best remembered for his work on the Skaergaard intrusion in Greenland, and for his attempt on Mount Everest in 1933.

== Early life ==
Wager was born in Batley, Yorkshire, and was the son of Morton Ethelred Wager and Adelina Rickard. Wager attended Hebden Bridge Grammar School, where his father was headmaster. He later lived with his uncle Harold Wager, FRS, a botanist and mycologist, while studying at Leeds Grammar School.

He then entered Pembroke College, Cambridge, where he gained a first class degree in geology in 1926. While at Cambridge, he developed an interest in climbing, spending a number of holidays in the Wales, Scotland and the Alps, and serving as president of the university's mountaineering club. He was also, later, identified as one of a number of the Cambridge Night Climbers, along with Gino Watkins and Vivian Fuchs, among others. After three years of further research at Cambridge, he was appointed lecturer in the geology department at the University of Reading in 1929.

== Greenland ==
In 1930, Wager made his first trip to eastern Greenland with the British Arctic Air Route Expedition led by Gino Watkins. Early in the expedition, Wager identified and named the Skaergaard intrusion at the mouth of the Kangerdlugssuaq Fjord and immediately realised its significance, a realisation that has been called "a stroke of genius". The expedition (which continued over the winter) also proved his mettle as an explorer; at one point the relief of a station required him to undertake a 125-mile sledge journey to the highest point on the ice-cap in atrocious conditions – an endeavour which took 39 days. Wager also made an attempt to climb Mount Forel in Schweizerland, at the time the highest known peak in the Arctic at 11,500 ft. The party turned back 500 ft below the summit, but had still made the highest climb in the Arctic to date.

The research carried out in Greenland would form the basis of Wager's subsequent career, and he made a further three visits there in the 1930s, including the Scoresby Sound Committee's 2nd East Greenland Expedition, 1932 led by Ejnar Mikkelsen; and an over-winter expedition in 1935–36 with Alex Deer, which Wager led. The aim was to map the Skaergaard Intrusion in detail, and as much of the surrounding area as possible. A total of 35,000 km^{2} of difficult terrain was mapped, and the results of his explorations were published in four volumes of Meddelelser om Grønland. The work on the Skaergaard Intrusion has been described as possibly "the most significant single contribution yet made to the science of petrology".

== Everest ==
In 1933 Hugh Ruttledge led a British expedition to the north side of Mount Everest, the first since the 1924 expedition on which Mallory and Irvine had disappeared. The team assembled included Percy Wyn-Harris, who had known Wager at Cambridge, and when Noel Odell was forced to drop out for business reasons, Wager was selected as a late replacement. On 30 May, Wager and Wyn-Harris made the team's first attempt on the summit. They followed the traverse route below the mountain's northeast ridge, as pioneered by Norton in 1924, rather than the ridge itself. They reached approximately the height Norton had gained (28,200 ft) before turning back due to poor snow conditions and the lateness of the hour. In doing so, they equalled the highest point reached in mountaineering at the time, and set an altitude record for climbing without supplemental oxygen which would not be bettered until Messner and Habeler reached the summit of Everest in 1978. He also participated in the unsuccessful 1936 expedition.

== Wartime service and post-war career ==
During the Second World War, Wager worked for the Royal Air Force in the photographic interpretation section. He was commissioned as a pilot officer on 12 August 1940, and promoted to flying officer a year later. In 1942 he braved the notorious Murmansk Run as part of a small reconnaissance team attempting to track down the German battleship Tirpitz. Wager was Mentioned in Despatches for his work. He was promoted to temporary flight lieutenant on 1 September 1942, and the rank was made substantive on 11 February 1943. He resigned his commission on 1 July 1944.

In 1944 Wager was appointed to the Chair of Geology at the University of Durham. In 1946, Wager was elected a Fellow of the Royal Society for 'his important contribution to knowledge of calc-alkaline Rocks, magmatic differentiation, and the mechanics of igneous intrusion'. His nominators included Herbert Hawkins (his former Head of Department from Reading), EB Bailey, HH Read and Harold Jeffreys. He moved to the University of Oxford in 1950 as Professor of Geology (along with a fellowship at University College, Oxford). There he helped to modernise what had been a failing department. He made a further expedition to Greenland in 1953 with Alex Deer, but in 1955 a heart attack put an end to his career as an active mountaineer and explorer. His academic work was unaffected however, and he became active in the fields of geological age determination and isotope geochemistry. He was also a key driving force in the founding of two geological journals – Geochimica et Cosmochimica Acta in 1950 and Journal of Petrology in 1960. In 1965 he died suddenly as a result of a second heart attack. His book Layered Igneous Rocks, written with his protégé Malcolm Brown, was published posthumously in 1968, and became a standard text. The International Association of Volcanology and Chemistry of the Earth's Interior awards the Wager Medal in his honour.

== Family ==
Wager married Phyllis Worthington in 1934. Phyllis had trained as a ballet dancer, and performed at Sadlers Wells and The Old Vic; she met Wager at a Morris dancing festival. Soon after they were married, Phyllis accompanied Wager to East Greenland on the 1935–1936 expedition, along with her sister-in-law Elizabeth Mary (Kit) Wager. Phyllis and Kit were the first British women to spend a winter there.

Wager's extensive archives are held at the Oxford University Museum of Natural History.

== Honours ==
The Wager Glacier in Alexander Island, Antarctica, was named after him.

=== Awards ===
- 1933 Polar Medal
- 1936 Mungo Park Medal
- 1938 Back Award, Royal Geographical Society
- 1945 Bigsby Medal
- 1948 Spendiarov Prize
- 1962 Lyell Medal
