= 1933 British Mount Everest expedition =

Failed first ascent attempt

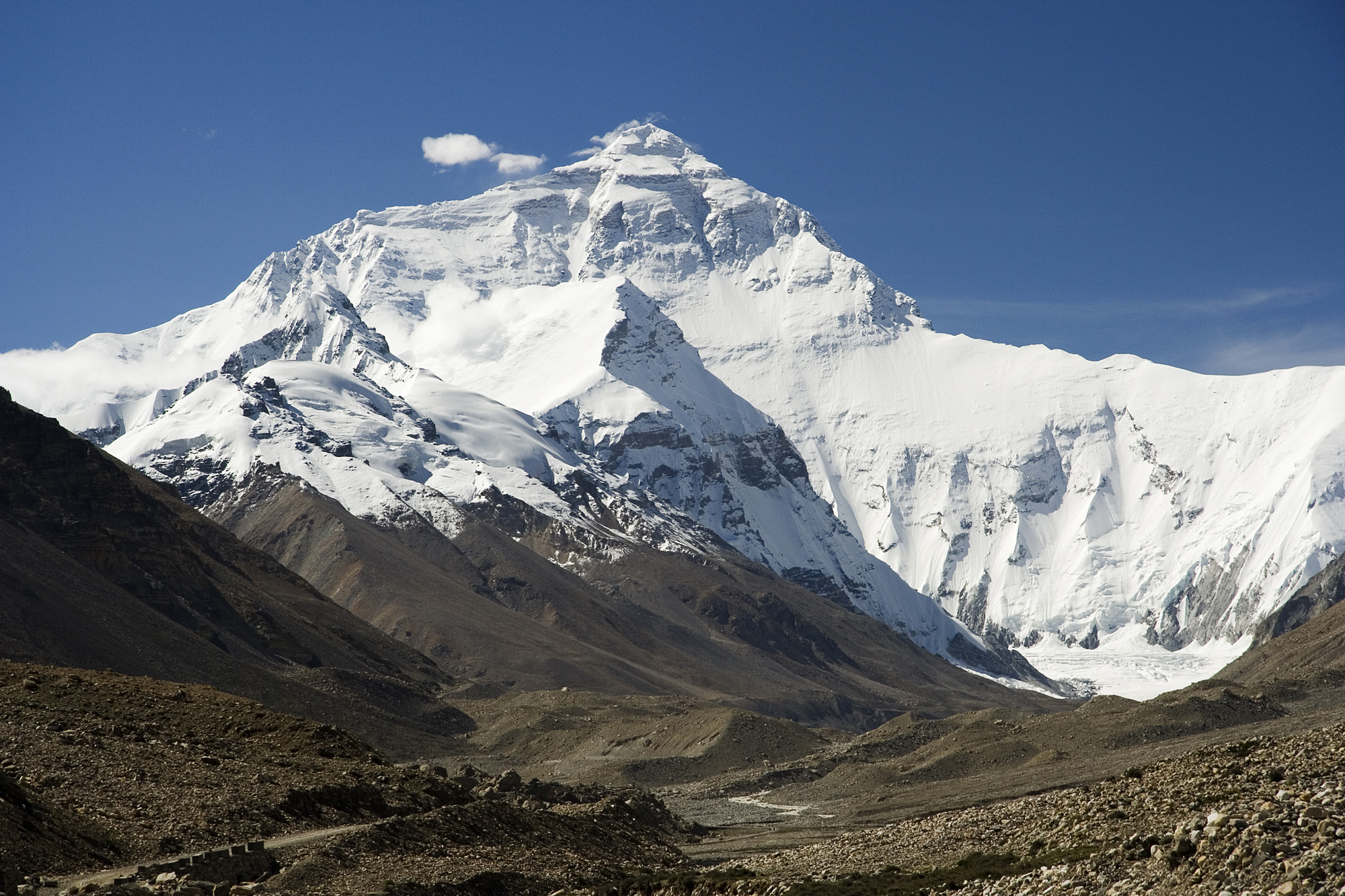
The north face of Mount Everest, scene of the 1933 attempt

The 1933 British Mount Everest expedition was, after the reconnaissance expedition of 1921, and the 1922 and 1924 expeditions, the fourth British expedition to Mount Everest and the third with the intention of making the first ascent.

Like the previous expeditions to climb the mountain, the 1933 expedition was unsuccessful, although in two separate attempts Lawrence Wager and Percy Wyn-Harris, and then F. S. Smythe, set an altitude record for climbing without supplemental oxygen that was not broken until Reinhold Messner and Peter Habeler reached the summit of Mount Everest in 1978. During Wager and Wyn-Harris's attempt, the ice-axe belonging to Andrew Irvine, who disappeared with Mallory on the 1924 attempt while going for the summit, was found on the flanks of the north face.

== Background ==
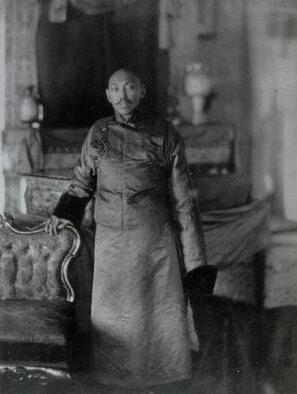
Thubten Gyatso, the 13th Dalai Lama, who in 1932 gave the British permission to make another attempt on Mount Everest

Following the unsuccessful attempts to climb Mount Everest in 1922 and 1924, the diplomatic Affair of the Dancing Lamas prevented further British expeditions for eight years. In August 1932 the 13th Dalai Lama granted permission for the mountain to be approached from Tibet in the north, on the condition that all the climbers taking part were British. This permission was won by the combined work of the India Office, the government of India and Lt-Col J. L. R. Weir, the British political agent in Sikkim. There was an urgency to their work owing to a British fear that the Germans, who had recently mounted expeditions to Kangchenjunga and Nanga Parbat, might next be targeting Mount Everest.

== Preparations ==
=== Participants ===
It fell to the Mount Everest Committee, the body that funded all pre-war attempts on Mount Everest, to appoint a leader for the expedition. The most obvious choice, General C. G. Bruce, was unavailable; two other suitable men, both of whom – like Bruce – had been on earlier expeditions to Mount Everest, were approached but declined the offer: Brigadier E. F. Norton, who had recently been appointed to a position in Aldershot, and Major Geoffrey Bruce, who was on the point of assuming a post in Quetta. Hugh Ruttledge was chosen as leader, with the proviso that, at forty-eight years of age, he was not to undertake any climbing on the upper reaches of the mountain. His choice surprised everyone, including Ruttledge, who, although a veteran Himalayan explorer, had not done much in the way of cutting-edge mountaineering; he also suffered from a limp as a result of a "pig-sticking accident".

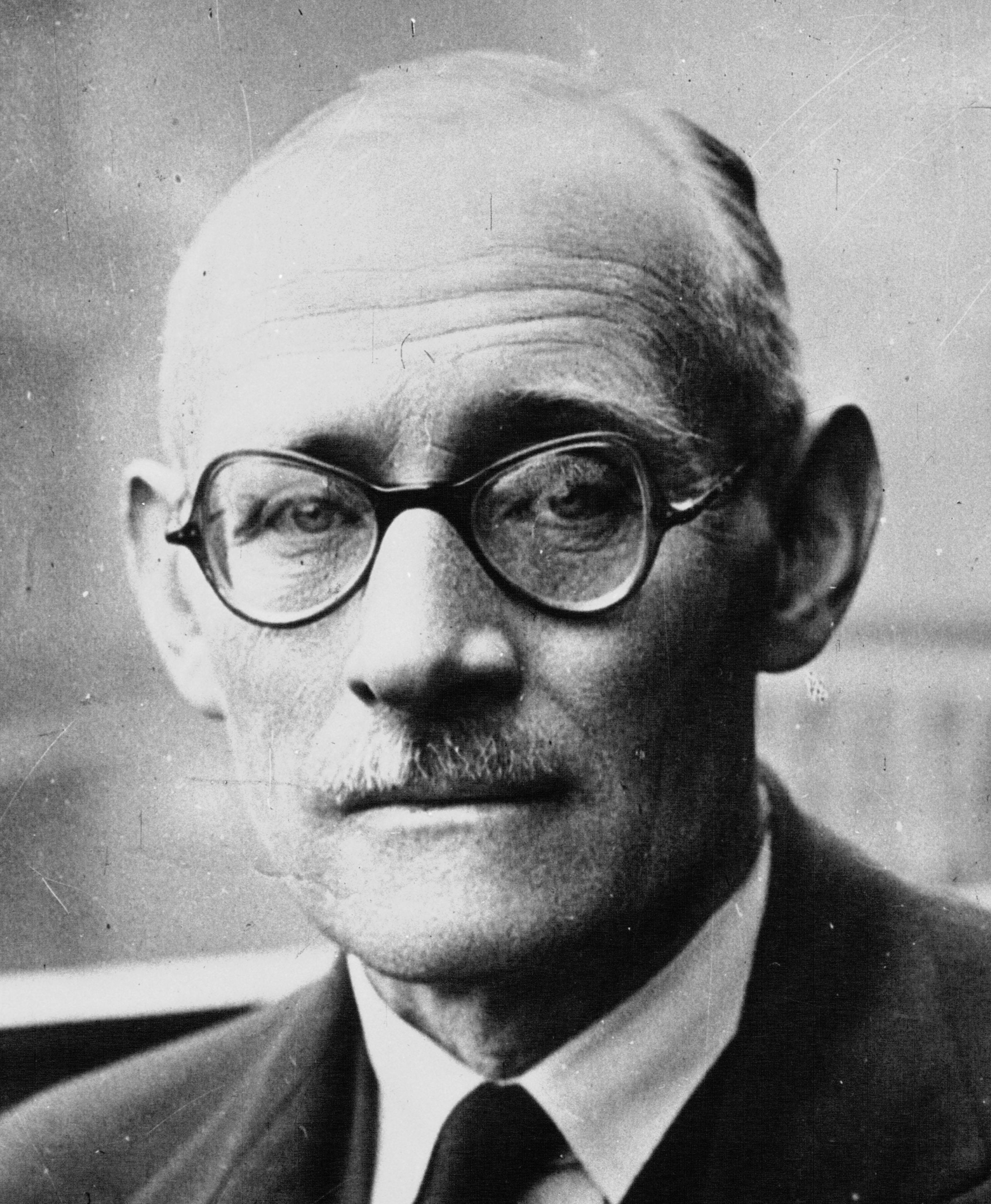
Hugh Ruttledge, the leader of the expedition, in 1936

Ruttledge was instructed to recruit the British climbing personnel for the expedition, assisted by an advisory sub-committee of Norton, T. G. Longstaff and Sydney Spencer, with Geoffrey Winthrop Young also giving assistance. Ruttledge was keen on inviting Mount Everest veterans; neither Noel Odell nor T. H. Somervell were available, but E. O. Shebbeare, who had been transport officer in 1924, was again selected in the role, this time also being appointed deputy leader – at forty-nine, he was the oldest member of the expedition; Crawford had also been to Mount Everest, in 1922. Other members of the party had previous Himalayan experience, too, in particular Shipton, who had climbed Kamet (as well as Mount Kenya), Dr Raymond Greene, the expedition senior physician who had also climbed Kamet, and Smythe, who had not only climbed Kamet but had been on the international expedition to Kangchenjunga with Professor Dyrenfurth. Birnie had also been on the Kamet expedition, as transport officer. Notable in their omission were several of the top British rock-climbers of the period – Alf Bridge, Colin Kirkus and Maurice Linnell – reflecting the traditional approach of the sub-committee, as well as Ruttledge himself, who said: "I am coming more and more to the opinion that we must beware of the north British school of rock-climbers if we are to succeed on Everest. Individually they are probably good men, but they are a close corporation, with, it seems to me, a contempt for everyone outside their own clan."

The following sixteen men comprised the British component of the team that attempted the ascent of the mountain, and were, according to Ruttledge, with the exception of himself, Shebbeare and the two wireless operators, chosen "with the definite idea that they were potentially capable of taking part in the final assaults on the mountain".

Name	Function	Profession
(United Kingdom) (British Raj) Hugh Ruttledge	Leader	Civil servant (Indian Civil Service)
(United Kingdom) (British Raj) E. O. Shebbeare	Deputy leader and transport officer	Indian Forestry Service
(United Kingdom) (British Raj) Captain E. St. J. Birnie	Mountaineer	Soldier (Sam Browne's Cavalry)
(United Kingdom) Major H. Boustead	Mountaineer	Soldier (Sudan Camel Corps)
(United Kingdom) T. A. Brocklebank	Mountaineer	Cambridge graduate
(United Kingdom) (British Raj) C. G. Crawford	Mountaineer	Civil servant (Indian Civil Service)
(United Kingdom) Dr C. R. Greene	Principal medical officer and mountaineer	Doctor
(United Kingdom) J. L. Longland	Mountaineer	English lecturer at Durham University
(United Kingdom) Dr W. McLean	Second medical officer and mountaineer	Staff of the Mission to the Jews, Jerusalem
(United Kingdom) E. E. Shipton	Mountaineer	Settler in Kenya
(United Kingdom) W. R. Smijth-Windham	Wireless operator	Soldier (Royal Corps of Signals)
(United Kingdom) F. S. Smythe	Mountaineer	Freelance adventurer
(United Kingdom) E. C. Thompson	Wireless operator	Soldier (Royal Corps of Signals)
(United Kingdom) L. R. Wager	Mountaineer	Lecturer in geology
(United Kingdom) G. Wood-Johnson	Mountaineer	Tea planter
(United Kingdom) P. Wyn-Harris	Mountaineer	Civil servant (Kenyan Civil Service)

All members of the expedition who lived in Britain were expected to submit themselves to a physical and psychological test by the RAF Medical Board, followed by a final test by Dr Claude Wilson.

=== Funding and equipment ===
The Mount Everest Committee furnished £5,000 towards the costs of the expedition, which were estimated at £11,000–£13,000. Further funds were secured by means of Ruttledge's book contract with Hodder & Stoughton, a newspaper deal with The Daily Telegraph and a gift of £100 from King George V. Many companies supplied items of equipment free of charge or at a discount.

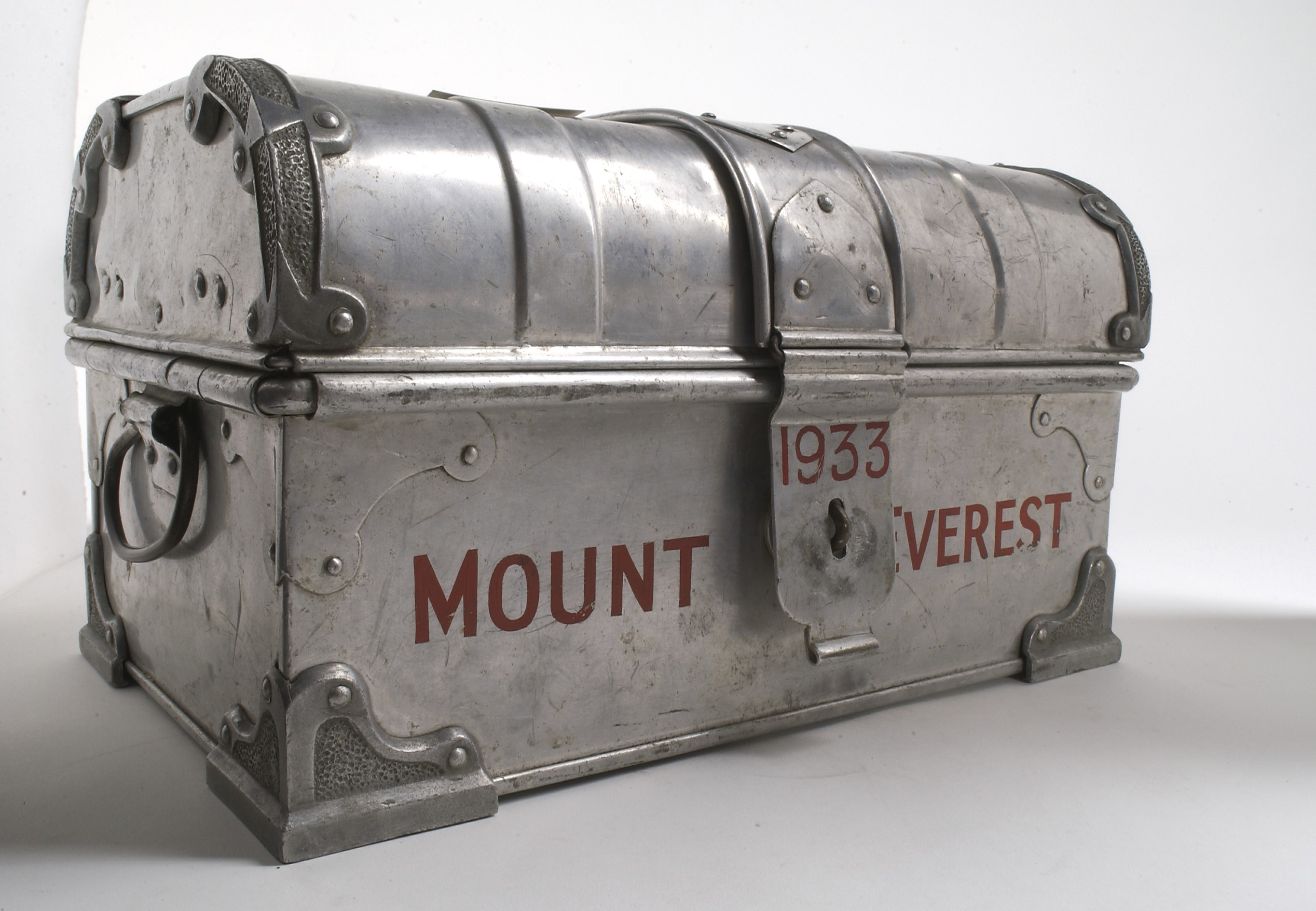
A Tabloid medicine chest, packed with Burroughs Wellcome Tabloid products, used on the 1933 Mount Everest Expedition

Five main types of tent were taken: a sixteen-man mess tent made by Silver and Edgington; three Muir Mills of Cawnpore bell tents for the porters, designed for fourteen men but occasionally fitting twenty-one; three Camp and Sports six-man arctic tents (a hybrid design between the Watkins Arctic tent and a yurt), looking, according to Greene, like a "plum-pudding without the sprig of holly" and termed "the real successes of the expedition" by Ruttledge for surviving the blizzards that blew in over the East Rongbuk Glacier at Camp III; and both Silver and Edgington Meade tents, and modified Meade tents made by Burns of Manchester. In addition, a number of lightweight emergency tents were bought by Longland. Burns, and Silver and Edgington, also supplied down sleeping bags, including the superior double-bag model; Jaeger supplied sleeping-sacks; and Sir George Lowndes supplied a bag in which three men might shelter in an emergency if they failed to reach their tents. High-altitude leather double-boots with clinker nails on their leather soles came from Robert Lawrie of Burnley, while approach boots were supplied by John Marlow and Son, and F. P. Baker and Co. Knee-high camp boots made of sheepskin and wool came from Clarke, Son and Morland. Dr T. Magor Cardell and Mr Hamblin jointly designed high-altitude goggles with orange-tinted glass, and ice-axes and crampons were bought from, amongst others, Horeschowsky in Austria. Puttees, made in Kashmir to a design suggested by General Bruce, were also taken. Beale of London supplied 2,000 feet of Alpine Club rope and light line; 2,000 feet came from Jones of Liverpool.

As with previous expeditions to Mount Everest, supplemental oxygen was taken. The decision was made to only use it above the North Col, and then only in case of emergency if acclimatisation had been unsuccessful. Greene worked in tandem with the British Association of Oxygen Supply and Siebe, Gorman & Co. and eventually a 12.75-pound (5.8 kg) model was made, no longer incorporating a flow meter but with a whistle that announced the flow of oxygen through the valve.

== Journey ==
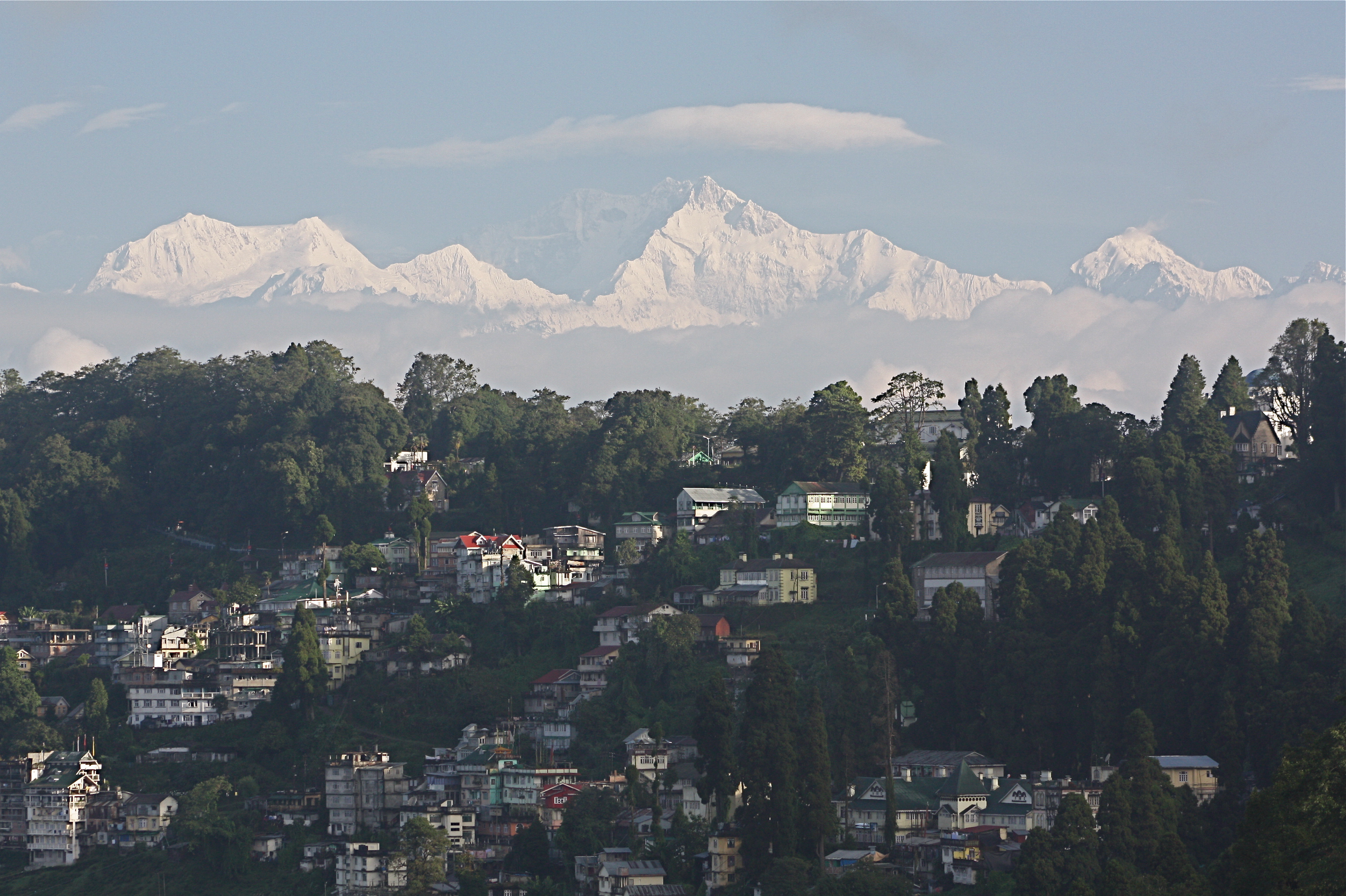
Darjeeling, where the expedition members gathered and where porters, supplies and transport were organised. Kangchenjunga is seen in the background.

The main party left England by sea on 20 January 1933, stopping at Gibraltar, where the Rock of Gibraltar "offered a climbing problem or two", and Aden. Time at sea was spent discussing the problem of climbing Mount Everest and the establishment of the various camps on its northern side, as well as learning the Nepali language, in which Crawford was proficient. The party alighted at Bombay, where they were assisted by C. E. Boreham, the manager of the Army and Navy Stores. Ruttledge, an India hand, took them on sightseeing tours to Agra and Fatehpur Sikri. Passing through Calcutta, where they were entertained by the Governor of Bengal, Sir John Anderson, the expedition members proceeded to Darjeeling, where Smythe, Greene and Birnie joined them, while Ruttledge went to Siliguri to rendezvous with Shebbeare and discuss transport arrangements. At Darjeeling porters were selected for the march, Ruttledge's Sherpas from his 1932 trip, Nima Dorje and Sanam Topgye, having gone to Sola Khombu to alert prospective applicants to the existence of the British expedition. Lhakpa Chedi, Lewa and Nursang were selected as sirdars. In addition, Nima Tendrup, a veteran of many expeditions to Mount Everest, as well as a number of Sherpas who had been on the recent German expeditions to Kangchenjunga, were brought along. Karma Paul, who had been on the 1922 and 1924 British expeditions, was taken as interpreter. All the porters were screened at the Darjeeling hospital, 34 per cent being found to be infected with internal parasites, and then clothed in blue-and-white striped pyjamas and given numbered identity disks.

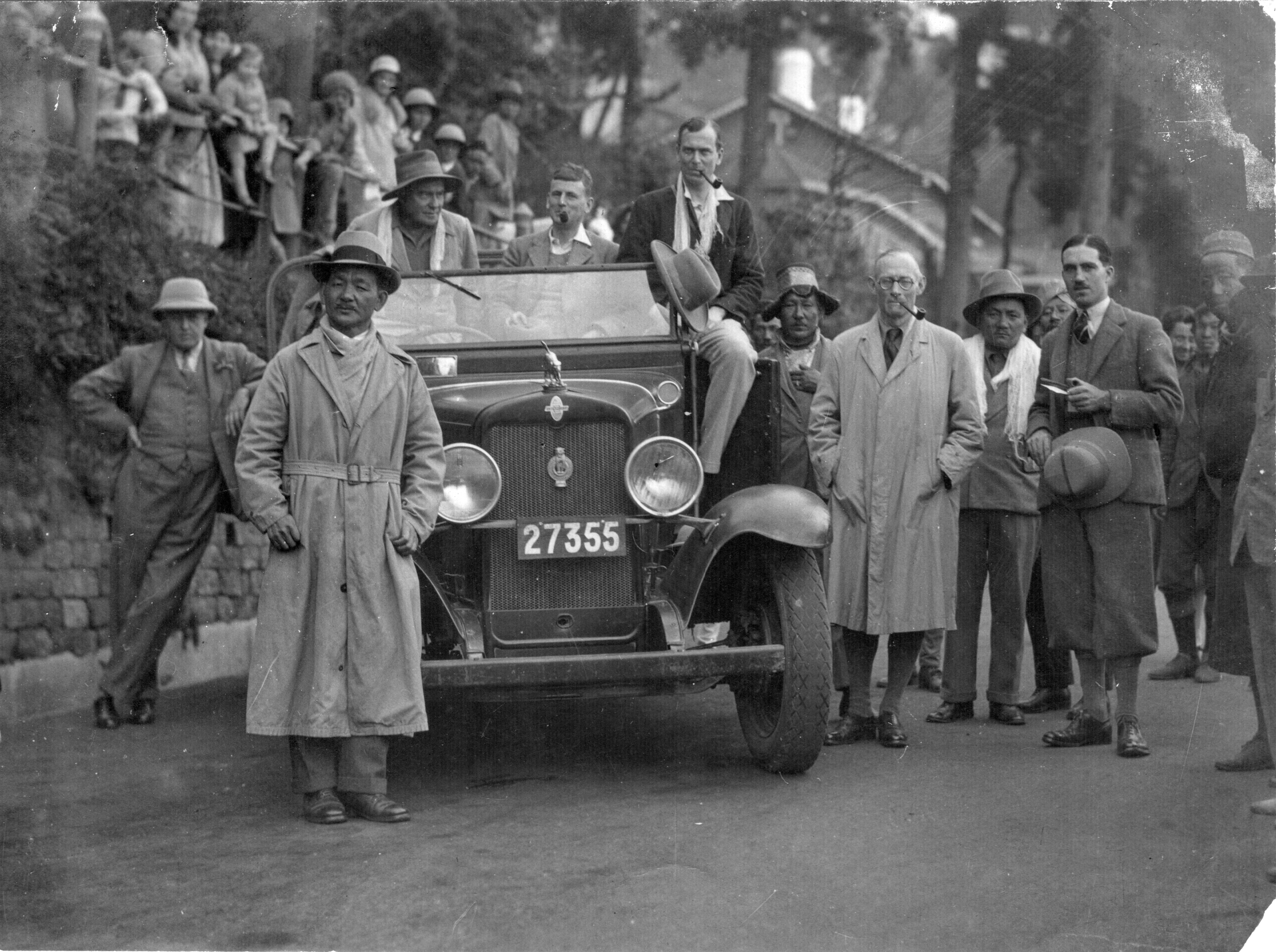
Members of the expedition in Darjeeling, India, in front of the Darjeeling Planters' Club. Expedition leader Hugh Ruttledge, pipe in mouth, is standing to the right of the car, with deputy leader E. O. Shebbeare behind the steering wheel.

On 2 March, in front of the Planters' Club in Darjeeling, the party attended the ceremonial blessing of all those taking part in expedition by the lamas of Ghoom monastery. Ruttledge remarked that "the ceremony was conducted with a quiet dignity which no one who was privileged to be present will ever forget".

The initial plan was to march to Mount Everest via the shortest and most direct route over the Sebu La, but this pass was still snow-covered so the alternative, longer route up the Chumbi Valley via Phari Dzong was taken. The party was split into two groups for the first part of the journey, with the intention of all groups meeting up in Gautsa, although Longland and Shipton travelled ahead to organise stores in Kalimpong. Those with no Himalayan experience departed first, on 3 March; the second group, which included Ruttledge, Shebbeare, Greene, Smythe and Birnie, left on 8 March. At Kalimpong, the Tibetan government trader, Pangda Tsang, stated that the heavy baggage train with mules should go to Kampa Dzong via the Jelep La, so a third group, made up of Smijth-Windham, Thompson and Karma Paul, accompanied the train with the intention of rejoining the second group at Yatung.

The route then took the expedition through Pedong and Pakhyong, until it reached Gangtok, Sikkim's capital, where Lobsang Tsering's postal service would be based; he would receive the expedition's mail and forward it to Calcutta. The expedition was entertained by F. Williamson, the political agent in Sikkim, who gave the party their passport with the Tibetan government's seal. It was made out to cover fourteen rather than sixteen people, omitting the expedition's two wireless operators, which later perplexed the Dipon of Pipitang, although the matter was soon sorted out following a telegram to Williamson. The party met the Maharaja of Sikkim, then departed for Karponang, Tsomgo and the crossing of the Natu La, where four of the party climbed the peak of Chomunko (17,500 ft).

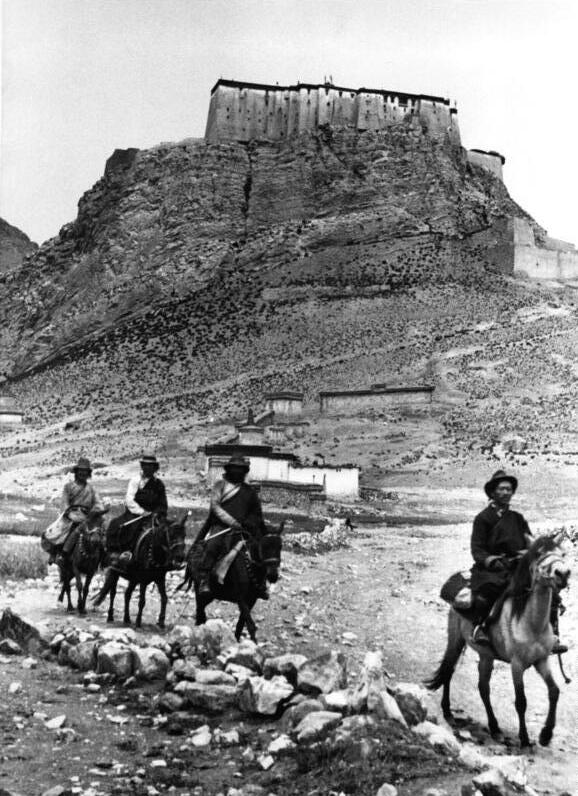
Kampa Dzong in 1938

The descent was made to Chumbitang, and thence to Yatung, past the monastery at Khajuk, where the lama and monks were mystified as to why anyone would wish to climb Mount Everest. The British trade agent in Yatung, Captain A. A. Russell, entertained members of the party, followed by a game of polo organised by Wood-Johnson. The entire expedition rendezvoused at Gautsa, where Ruttledge made Shebbeare "second-in-command". Here the weather became much colder, with the party's first snows coming on the evening of 22 March. Moving past Phari Dzong on 25 March, a diversion over the Tang La from the normal route on account of snow was made in tremendous wind, dropping down to Shabra Shubra and then over the Dongka La and Chago La to Limbu, Tatsang and finally Kampa Dzong, reached on 29 March, from a pass above which the party had its first view of Mount Everest one hundred miles in the distance. At Kampa Dzong, which possessed "architectural beauty of the highest order", Ruttledge clad himself in mock formal dress – a Tibetan silk gown with a sheepskin lining and red girdle, topped by a collapsible opera-hat that had originally been brought along from England as a reward to the most successful porter – to meet the nyapala. Ruttledge commented: "The effect was all that could be desired. Here obviously was a man [himself] of standing in his own country. Deep called unto deep in the most friendly manner, with mutual respect; and our negotiations were completely successful." The nyapala invited the party to tour the dzong. The nearby grave of A. M. Kellas, the Scottish pioneer climber who had died in 1921 on his way to the first expedition to Mount Everest, had been disturbed and so expedition members dragged a fresh slab to cover the spot, re-cut the existing inscription, and performed a brief ceremony over it. The advance stores had arrived at Kampa Dzong, as had the yaks and Longland, as quartermaster, set to organising them. The party departed on 2 April, passing Lingga and Mende on the way to Tengkye Dzong. Here a football match was staged, Boustead gave an exhibition of boxing and Longland put on a display of pole-vaulting using a bamboo pole (photographed by Smythe). Leaving the town on 5 April, the party travelled on to Khengu over the Bahman Dopté pass; at Khengu Lopsang Tsering fell off his pony and broke his collarbone; the anaesthetic administered by Greene stopped his heart, and only vigorous resuscitation, aided by coramine, saved his life.

The river Chiblung-Chu was next forded twice before the camp at Jikyop, then the party proceeded to Trangso-Chumbab and Kyishong, and then through a landscape compared by Shebbeare to the "mountains of the moon" until they reached Shekar Dzong, a vertiginous settlement of white houses and two monasteries that Ruttledge called "a setting for a fairy story, a place of enchantment". Here there was a smallpox epidemic; worse, according to Ruttledge, was the theft of equipment − including high-altitude boots and a Meade tent – and stores, for which the drivers of the baggage train were flogged by the Dzongpen the following day, although the culprit was never found. The expedition's Arctic tents were pitched for the first time at Shekar, to general approval, and a hair-cutting session took place, Wyn-Harris proving a capable barber. On 13 April the party departed, crossing the 17,000 ft Pang La before the descent to Tashidzom, where the expedition's ponies were stabled.

Chö-Dzong was reached on 15 April, from a hill above which a clear view of Mount Everest was obtained with a naval telescope. The north face appeared relatively snow-free and the ledges along which Norton traversed were clear to the eye but, according to Ruttledge, looking "remarkably difficult", while the overhanging Second Step appeared "a formidable obstacle" and, although the summit slopes looked feasible, "the problem was to reach [them] across the frightful slabs of the couloir walls".

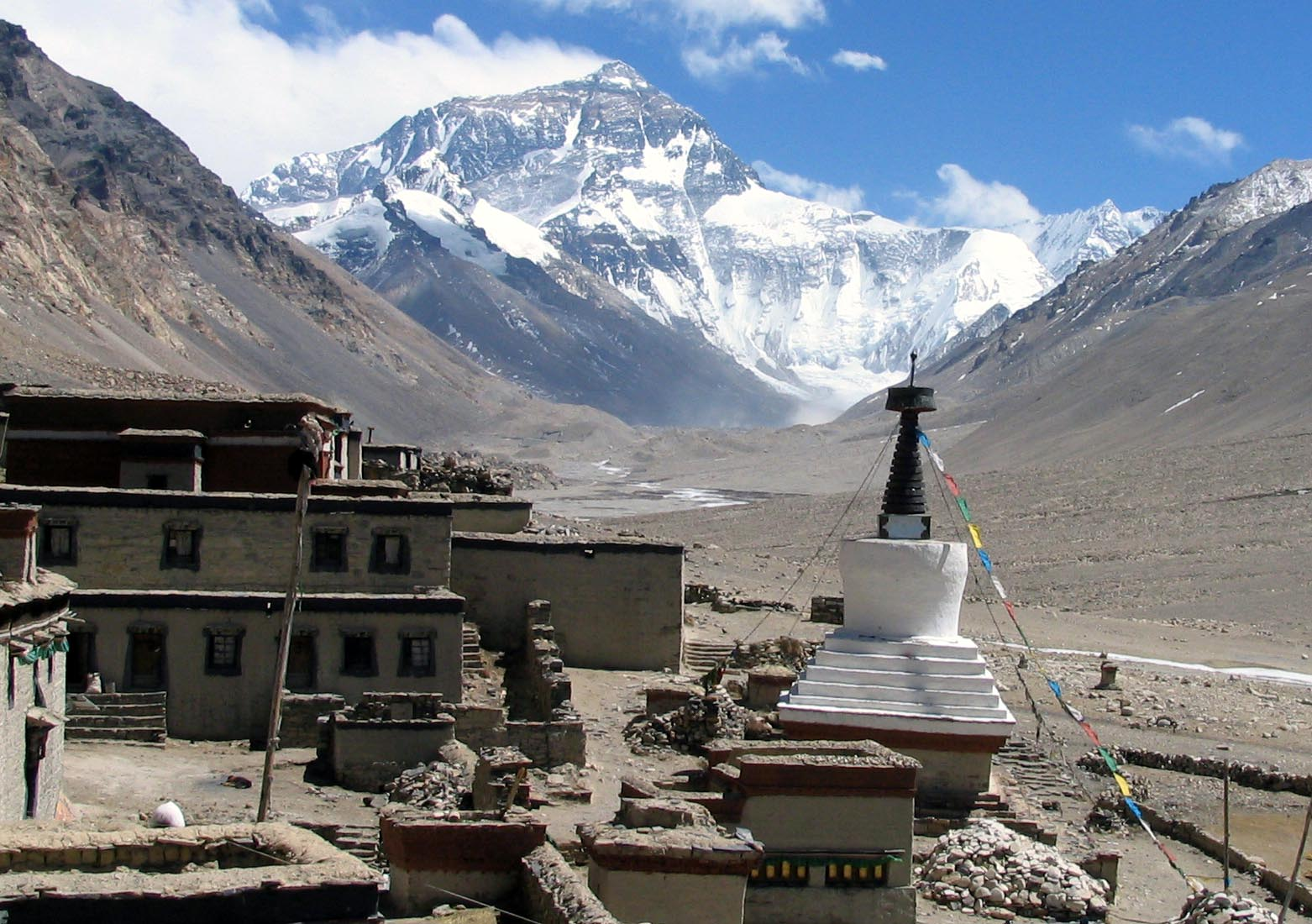
The Rongbuk Monastery, with Mount Everest's north face (background). The expedition members were blessed at the monastery by the lama.

Ruttledge wrote of this first close and detailed view of the mountains:

"Darkness began to fall as long clouds drifted across the summit. We descended to camp in a mood of qualified optimism. At least we had been able, for the first time, to see for ourselves, to form a judgement of our own, and from a distance which allowed of a fairly true perspective. Henceforth we should be too much under the mountain to estimate our difficulties with any accuracy."

—

As the party marched up the Rongbuk valley past enormous moraines towards the Rongbuk Monastery, numerous Tibetans streamed past them from the monastery. Karma Paul, the interpreter, was dispatched to seek an audience with the lama of the monastery, as his blessing was considered important both by the Tibetan porters as well as those from Sola Khombu in Nepal. This petition being successful, the lama – having asked Ruttledge whether he was related to General Bruce, leader of the last expedition that had passed by the monastery – blessed each member of the expedition individually, touching their heads with his dorje while they uttered the words "Om mani padme hum".

== Establishment of the camps ==
On 17 April, Base Camp was pitched, positioned in the same place as in previous expeditions, four miles beyond the Rongbuk Monastery. Here a number of team members were found to be ill: Crawford had bronchitis, Wyn-Harris had gone down with influenza and Thompson was suffering from heart trouble. Ondi, a porter, was found to have double-pneumonia, so he, Crawford and Maclean descended to Rongbuk. Despite this, all worked hard establishing the lower camps, the principle being that each camp had to be fully equipped before a move was made to a higher one, so that each could be maintained during spells of bad weather, rather than abandoned. The wireless equipment, operated by Smijth-Windham and Thompson, was soon in action and a signal from Darjeeling was picked up on 20 April. A "wireless room" was set up in a tent, and two wireless masts, a wind generator and a petrol engine deployed. The expedition's money chests at Base Camp were guarded by Havildar-Major Gaggan Singh, the Gurkha soldier, while his two NCOs, Lachman Singh and Bahadur Gurung supervised the glacier camps.

Using local Tibetan labour from Shekar Dzong up to Camp II to spare the high-altitude porters, Camp I, 400 yards (365m) from the East Rongbuk glacier, was established on 21 April, Smythe, Shipton, Birnie, Boustead, Wood-Johnson and Brocklebank all spending the night there, and Camp II, at 19,800 ft (6035m) on the western side of the East Rongbuk glacier, on 26 April, by Smythe, Shipton, Boustead and Wood-Johnson. Here, at "an important nerve-centre in the lines of communication", tents were erected to house at least forty men.

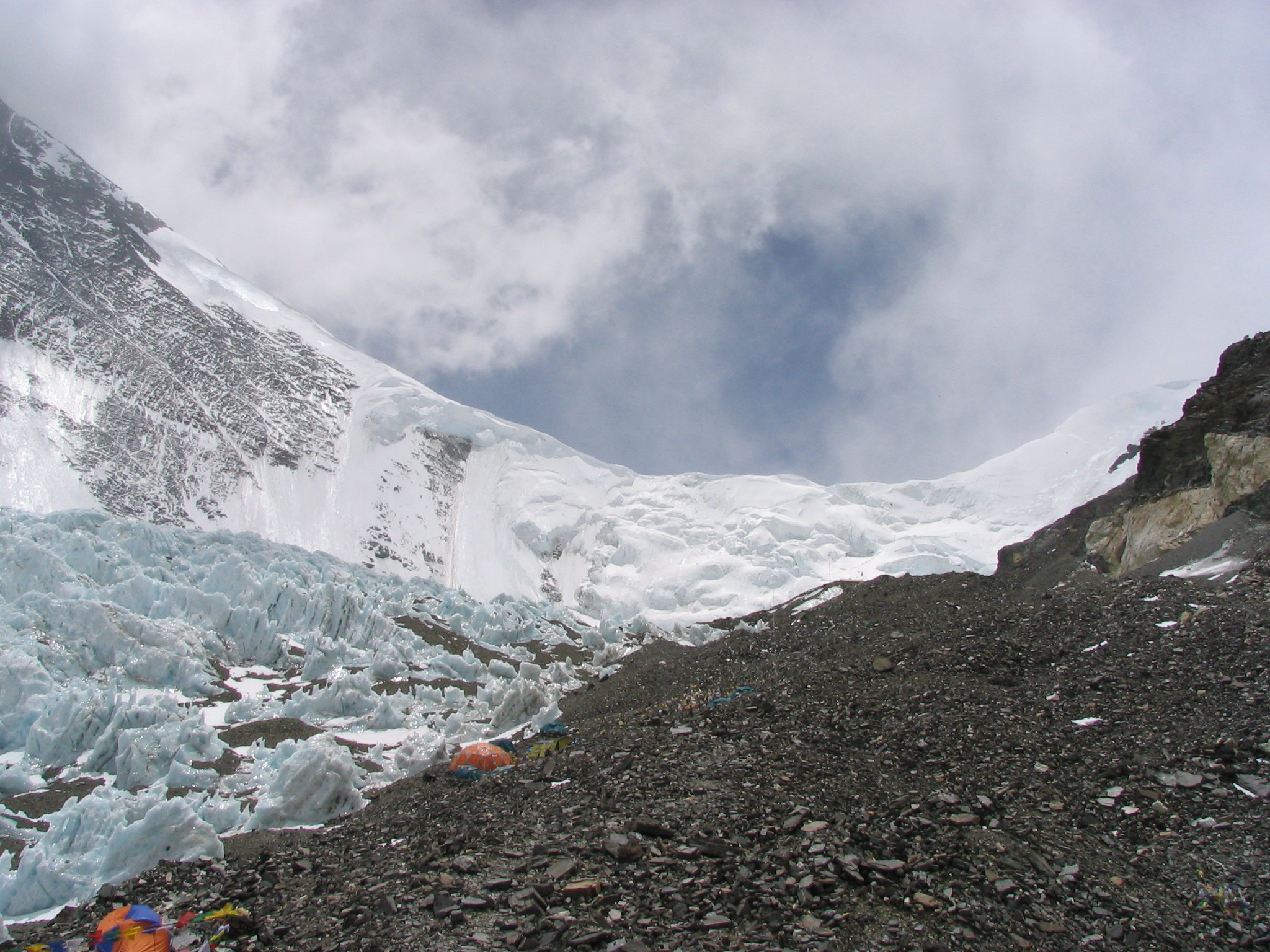
Moraine and penitentes leading to the ice wall below the North Col

Camp III was established on 2 May by Smythe, Shipton, Birnie, Boustead, Wood-Johnson and Longland, together with porters, with the intention that it would be wholly independent of Base Camp and could swiftly supply higher camps. The camp was at just over 21,000 ft (6400m). From here the North Col was clearly visible and constituted, in Ruttledge's words, "the first serious mountain problem ... for a steep glacier ice-fall is always on the move, and the negotiable route of one year may be seamed by crevasses or barred by ice-cliffs the next". Conscious of the avalanche that killed seven porters on the 1922 expedition, team members were circumspect in their approach to the sometimes vertical 1,000 ft ice wall that led up the col. A Camp IIIa was established at its foot to ease the difficulties of climbing this wall; eventually, the route taken by the 1924 expedition proving impossible – "it would take weeks to cut steps up this slope", – the same route as was taken in 1922 was selected, leading to a shelf on the lower side of a crevasse below the col, which was to be the site of Camp IV. Smythe, Shipton, Greene, Longland, Wyn-Harris, Wager and Brocklebank climbed the slope and equipped it with fixed ropes between 8 and 15 May; each day the steps they cut would be filled with snow, making re-ascent laborious. Smythe and Shipton made the final ascent over a vertical ice section to the ledge using combined tactics on 12 May ("a fine effort of ice-craft, which evoked a sincere recognition") with Longland and Wager fixing the rope ladder (presented, along with two others, by the Yorkshire Rambling Club) the following day. Bad weather prevented the establishment of Camp IV until 15 May; thereafter, the camp was stocked by Crawford and Brockleback in what Ruttledge called "their great series of six ascents and descents of the North Col slopes ... [making] the position of the higher party secure".

Once the North Col had been attained, the establishment of camps higher up the mountain was possible. There was, however, disagreement over the siting of Camp V. On 20 May a party of Wyn-Harris, Birnie and Boustead, with porters, eventually left all of their stores on the slope and returned to Camp IV, Wyn-Harris having wished to go much higher than the others. Ruttledge, learning of this from a letter sent down to Camp IIIa, decided to ascend to Camp IV "to straighten out the position". He sent Wyn-Harris, Greene, Birnie and Boustead, with porters, on upwards with the aim of pitching Camp V at 25,500 ft and then Camp VI above that the next day, Lhakpa Chedi accompanying them with a team of eight porters; Birnie and Boustead, with porters, would then descend, while Wager and Longland would ascend to Camp V, then descend, and Shipton and Smythe would go to Camp V, then Camp VI, with the aim of having two summit parties in place. In the event Camp V was pitched at 25,700 ft on 22 May, the climbers passing George Finch's shredded Meade tent from the 1922 attempt, near to which a number of oxygen cylinders – one, still functional, refreshed Greene – and an unopened canister of Kodak film were found, although on closer inspection lower down it was discovered that there were no exposures on the film. Greene, who was expected to go higher, descended from Camp V with heart trouble, and Wager replaced him as Wyn-Harris's partner, going up to Camp V that same afternoon. The following day, 23 May, dawned cold and snowy; Shipton and Smythe ascended to Camp V in strong wind, while Wager and Wyn-Harris returned to Camp V, owing to a lack of room in the tents. That same day the wireless line was extended to Camp IV, meaning that Ruttledge's words from Camp IV could be passed, via a verbal relay to Smijth-Windham at Camp III and Thompson's encoding at Base Camp, to the Daily Telegraph in London in six hours. The dismal weather continued throughout the 23rd and 24th, and, there being no sign of the party above, Ruttledge, together with Wager, Wyn-Harris, Longland and Crawford ascended to investigate. At 24,200 feet the leading members of their party – Wager and Wyn-Harris – learnt from a descending Smythe that Camp V had been abandoned and that all were on their way down. In the descent in atrocious conditions, several Sherpas suffered frostbite – Lhakpa Chedi later required the amputation of two fingers, and Pasang lost one finger – and Birnie, attempting a glissade down the north face, lost control and would have been killed but for the intervention of Da Tsering.

== Summit attempts ==
=== First: Wager and Wyn-Harris ===
Wager and Wyn-Harris left Camp VI at 5.40 a.m. on 30 May, after spending an hour heating water and eating "a very poor meal", to make their summit bid. Not long after setting off they came across an ice-axe lying on rocky slabs sixty feet below the north-east ridge, bearing the inscription Willisch of Täsch, an equipment maker from Zermatt. They left it where they found it and collected it on their descent later in the day. In Everest 1933, Ruttledge's book of the expedition, he writes that "it is probable that this one was carried by Irvine"; that it is highly likely to be Irvine's axe is supported by the fact that three notches carved into his axe exactly match the three notches cut into the side of his swagger stick.

Wager and Wyn-Harris's first objective was to see whether the Second Step on the ridge was climbable. They turned the First Step and traversed under the Second Step, not realising that it was guarded by a band of cliffs from below. To make their way up this, Wager and Wyn-Harris aimed for a gully that they believed led to the top of the Second Step. Finding that this was merely a shallow scoop, they followed Norton's 1924 traverse along the slabs above the yellow band on the north face, reaching the Great Couloir at 10.00 a.m.

=== Second: Shipton and Smythe ===
Shipton and Smythe were waiting at Camp VI for Wager and Wyn-Harris's return. Shipton, struck down by illness, could go no further and after a brief discussion with Smythe, decide to descend to Camp VI. Smythe pressed on alone. At 28,120 feet, approximately the same height as Wager and Wyn-Harris, Smythe turned back. On his way down Smythe reported sighting two UFOs.

== Aftermath ==
The investigation into the expedition's failure set up by the Mount Everest Committee organisation and leadership ruled that Ruttledge, whom they greatly liked and respected, was not an assertive leader.

In his review of Everest 1933 (Ruttledge, 1941, first published in 1934), G. L. Corbett commended the book with the words, "There are passages as fine as anything in Alpine literature." When analysing the expedition's overall lack of success, he stated that although "there has never been an attempt on a mountain more carefully prepared, more methodically directed", three things were responsible for the failure to reach Mount Everest's summit. First, the disagreements over the siting of Camp V and the resulting descent to Camp IV led to the loss of an unusually good climbing window between 20 and 22 May. As Raymond Greene later said, "It may be that we lost not two days but twenty years." The weather thereafter deteriorated sharply. Corbett places the blame squarely at the feet of Ruttledge, who should have been at Camp IV to direct operations, rather than lower down the mountain. Second, the instructions to Wager and Wyn-Harris to try to tackle the Second Step lost them valuable time, and even though they eventually decided to take Norton's lower traverse they were by no means convinced that the Step was unclimbable. Regarding the flexibility of their approach, Corbett quoted Smythe, who stated that "Everest will only be climbed by a man who is single-minded in the matter of route, and any doubt or hesitancy in this respect must always lead to defeat." Third, the fact that Smythe was forced to make his summit bid alone was directly attributable to Shipton falling ill on the attempt. Solo climbing, Corbett argued, "is not a practice to be encouraged anywhere: on the last thousand feet of Everest, in dangerous condition, it is bad mountaineering".

In Upon that Mountain (1943) Shipton wrote that the expedition was far too big and that the number of climbers taken – fourteen – was absurd. He rebuffed the argument put forward by the climbing establishment that reserve climbers were needed in case of sickness, arguing that in the event no one "who was known to be capable of climbing to great altitudes, actually succumbed to sickness before the attempt." Moreover, the large complement of climbers on the expedition had an adverse psychological effect, making climbers feel superfluous to an expedition whose aim was simply to put a very small number of climbers on the summit: "Such a state of affairs imposes an intolerable strain on everyone, and is bound to lead to friction and a consequent loss of efficiency." By way of an alternative, Shipton advocated expeditions composed of a small number of climbers, each of whom "recognises their vital importance in the common effort and feels himself to have an equally indispensable part to play." His 1952 statement to the Mount Everest Committee was one of the reasons why he was not chosen to lead the successful 1953 expedition to Mount Everest: "My well-known dislike of large expeditions and my abhorrence of a competitive element in mountaineering might well seem out of place in the present situation."

== Bibliography ==
- Corbett, G. L. (1 April 1935). "Reviews". Himalayan Journal. 7.
- Glasby, Geoff. "Geological Society – Skaergaard, Everest and more..." geolsoc.org.uk.
- Hoyland, Graham (2013). Last Hours on Everest: The Gripping Story of Mallory and Irvine's Fatal Ascent. London: HarperCollins.
- Ruttledge, Hugh (1941). Everest 1933 (2nd ed.). London: Hodder & Stoughton.
- Ruttledge, Hugh (1934). "The Mount Everest Expedition of 1933". Himalayan Journal. 6.
- Salkeld, Audrey. "Hugh Ruttledge". Oxford Dictionary of National Biography. OUP.
- Shipton, Eric. (1983). "Large or Small" in Mirrors in the Cliffs, ed. Ken Wilson, London: Diadem.
- Thompson, Simon (2010). Unjustifiable Risk? The Story of British Climbing. Milnthorpe: Cicerone Press.
