= Kenneth Mason (geographer) =

British geographer (1887–1976)

Lieutenant-Colonel Kenneth Mason MC
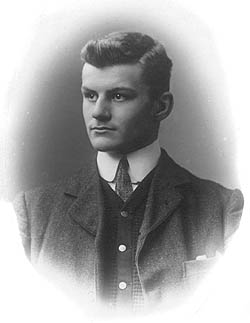
- Kenneth Mason
- Born: 10 September 1887; Sutton, Surrey
- Died: 2 June 1976 (aged 89)
- Education: Royal Military Academy, Woolwich
- Occupations: Soldier, explorer, Professor

Lieutenant-Colonel Kenneth Mason MC (10 September 1887 – 2 June 1976) was a British soldier and explorer notable as the first statutory professor of Geography at the University of Oxford. His work surveying the Himalayas was rewarded in 1927 with a Royal Geographical Society Founder's Medal, the citation reading for his connection between the surveys of India and Russian Turkestan, and his leadership of the Shaksgam Expedition.

== Personal life ==
Kenneth Mason was born at Sutton, Surrey, the son of Ellen Martin (née Turner) and Stanley Engledue Mason, a timber broker. He was educated first at Homefield Preparatory School, where he was savagely beaten, but regarded such treatment with equanimity, offering the opinion that "If every silly ass that grows a beard and sits down in the London roads to demonstrate had been well and truly beaten when young, he too might have learned sense!". Mason went on to Cheltenham College, where he excelled in Mathematics and prepared for exams required to enter the army. He was successful and joined the Royal Military Academy, Woolwich in 1905. Mason married Dorothy Helen Robinson in 1917 and they had two sons and one daughter. Devoted to the Drapers' Company, Mason became its Master in 1949.

== Soldier and surveyor ==
Mason was commissioned into the Royal Engineers as a second lieutenant in 1906, then sent to the Royal School of Military Engineering where he learned surveying, mechanics, topographic sketching, musketry, revolver shooting, and ballistics. He was posted to the Survey of India in 1909 and, having sailed for Karachi, helped to pioneer stereoscopic techniques that were to revolutionise cartography using aerial and land-based photogrammetry. 1910-1912 saw him directed by Sir Sidney Burrard to execute precise triangulation in Kashmir that would link up British mapping of India to surveys performed in Russia. The work involved learning climbing techniques, and Mason also taught himself to ski, coordinating large teams of men and pack animals working in hazardous locations. As he recalled in an oral history of life under the British Raj broadcast by BBC Radio:

I never lost a man in any of my survey operations. I had one man who, against my instructions, and against the line that we were taking on a snow mountain with a cornice, went to look over the edge. He was carrying my tiffin basket, and I saw the cornice break off, and I saw him go down, and I went to the edge to look and see what had happened to him. He must have fallen at least a thousand feet or more. Finished up on a snow slide. He then picked himself up, looked for the tiffin basket and collected the things that had fallen out of the tiffin basket and came back to the mountain on his own, all up the right way, the way that we had taken, and delivered my tiffin at about tea time.

With the outbreak of the First World War, Mason's military service took him to France. He saw action in the Neuve Chapelle sector and Loos before, in January 1916, landing at Basra, Iraq. In action connected to the relief of Kut, he led a night march to the flank of the Dujailah redoubt, and was subsequently awarded the Military Cross. He entered Baghdad as Intelligence Officer with the Black Watch. He was promoted to Brevet-Major and three times mentioned in dispatches.

== Explorer ==
Following the Armistice, Mason was the first to take motor cars across the Syrian Desert. He then returned to India and, in 1926, began preparing for his most important scientific project, the exploration of the Shaksgam Valley in Xinjiang, China. The valley lies to the north of Baltoro Muztagh, a subrange of the Karakoram mountain range that includes K2, the second highest mountain in the world.

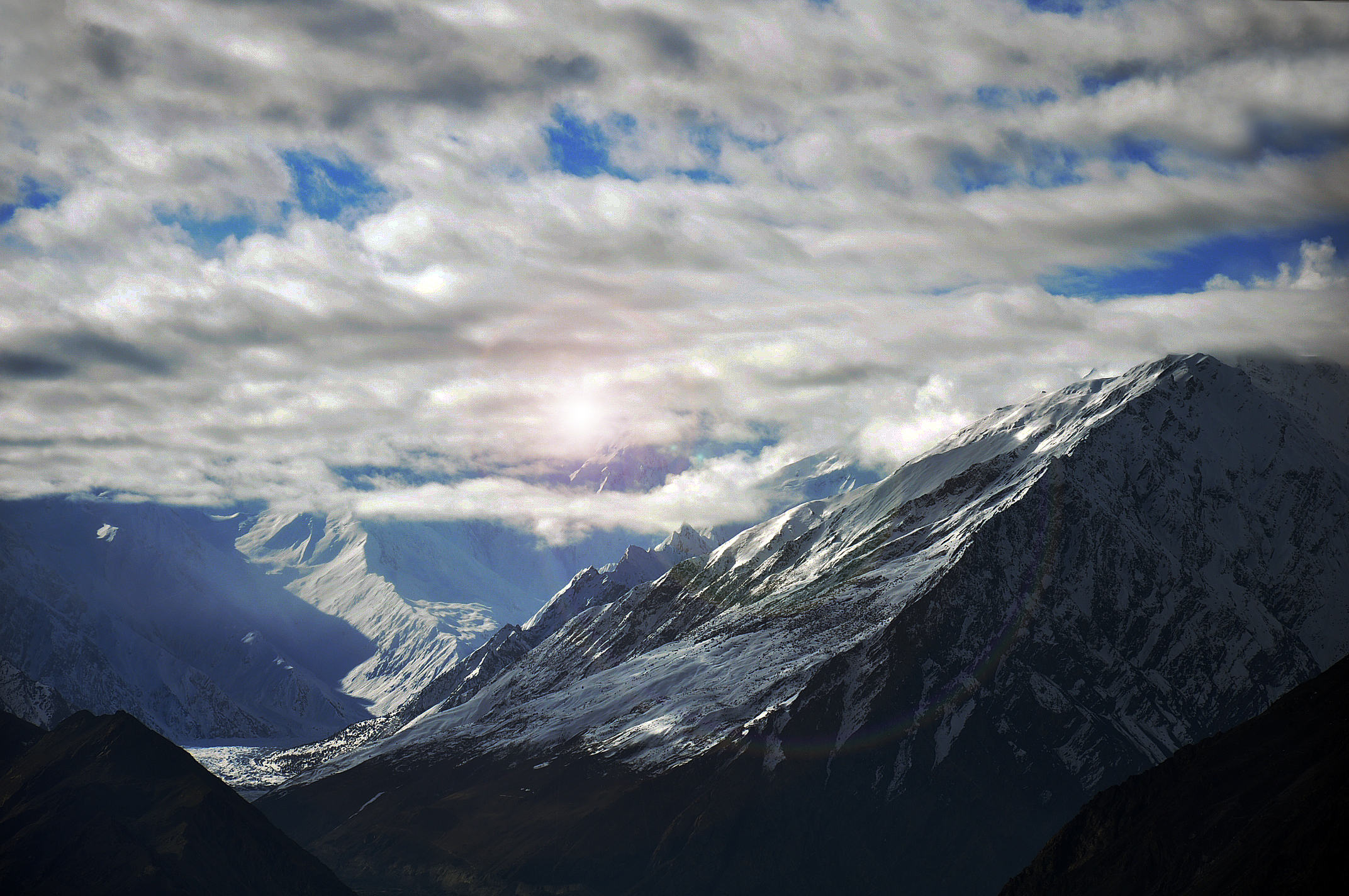
The Karakoram, a large mountain range spanning the borders between Pakistan, India and China

In the context of long-running political rivalry between world powers that became known as the Great Game, over several decades interest of the British Imperial authorities in this unmapped and uninhabited territory had been growing, because it provided access to the Aghil Pass linking China to Ladakh, India. However, the only westerner to see the valley had been Francis Younghusband, whose book The heart of a continent : a narrative of travels in Manchuria, across the Gobi Desert, through the Himalayas, the Pamirs, and Chitral, 1884-1894 had first inspired Mason as a schoolboy to pursue a career in geography. Now, Younghusband encouraged Mason to follow in his footsteps.

With support from the Royal Geographical Society (RGS), Mason set out from the south, surveying using a photo-theodolite and aiming to reach the Shaksgam Valley from the Karakorum Pass. He explored the Aghil range in the Karakoram fault system and confirmed the source of the Shaksgam river, then planned to follow the valley downstream. However, when several glaciers blocked the valley and had to be bypassed, Mason's expedition ended up in a similar looking valley, parallel and northeast of the true Shaksgam valley. By the time Mason realized the mistake, supplies were running low, and the only option was to retreat so he named the previously unknown valley Zug Shaksgam (“false Shaksgam”). Mason returned to Europe with great quantities of data representing the first attempt to apply stereographic techniques to both small scales and great distances. His results, plotted in Switzerland using what, at the time, was the world's most advanced Stereoplotter were acclaimed as brilliantly successful, winning him the 1927 RGS Founder's Medal.

In 1928, Mason and Geoffrey Corbett convened a group to co-found The Himalayan Club, "To encourage and assist Himalayan travel and exploration, and to extend knowledge of the Himalaya and adjoining mountain ranges through science, art, literature and sport." Mason edited the club's journal until 1940.

== Academic Geographer ==
Mason's long association with the RGS, including serving on its council and as a vice-president, was to prove pivotal to the next step in his career.

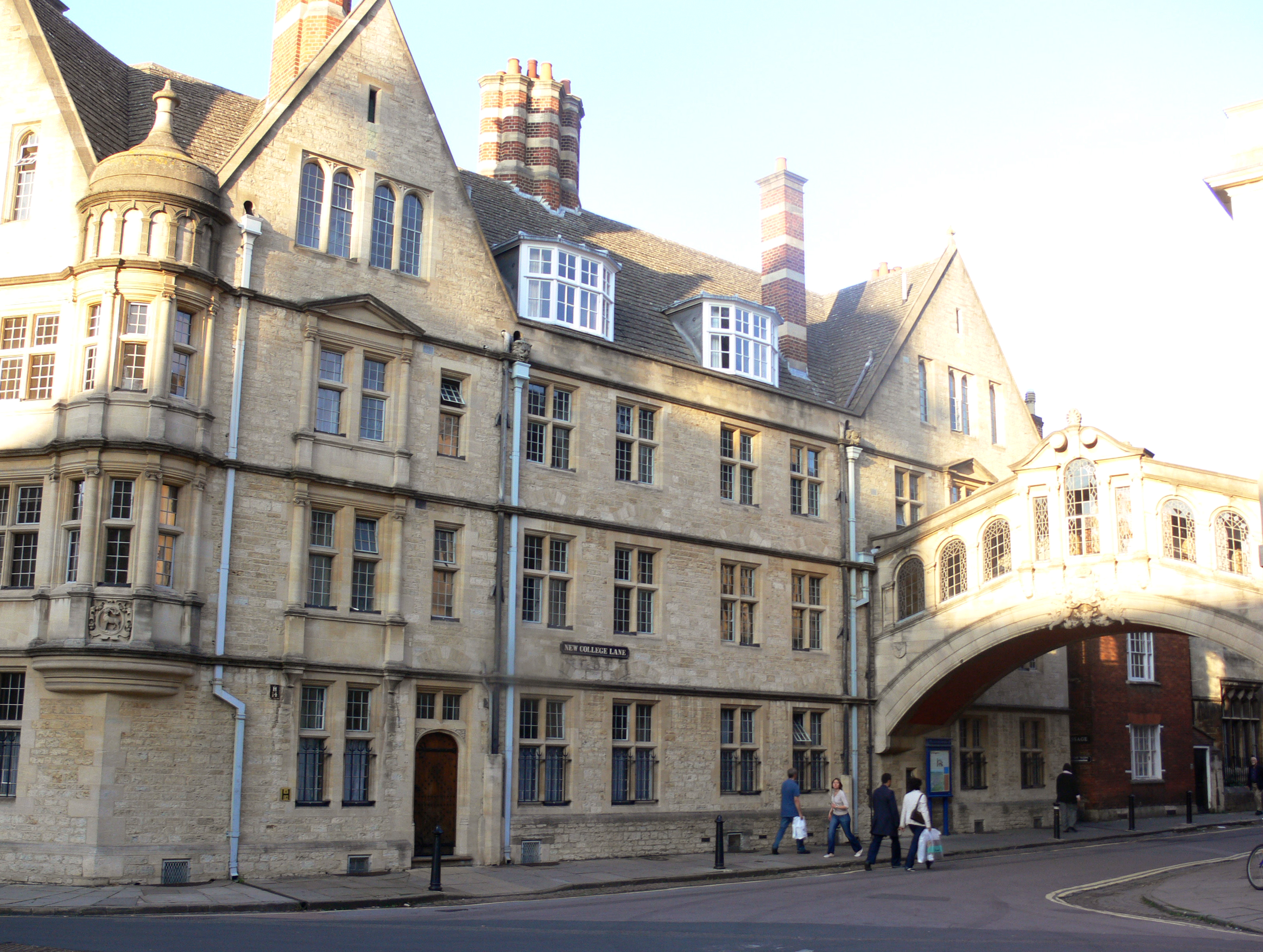
Oxford - Hertford College and Bridge of sighs

The archives of Oxford University contain evidence that Geography was taught in several colleges since at least 1541. However, the subject was given low priority until, in 1871, the Royal Geographical Society (RGS) made an approach that resulted in a Readership being established in 1887. Twelve years later, in 1899, a School of Geography was founded and a diploma course was introduced, with continuing financial support from the RGS, yet still the subject was not deemed of sufficient academic merit to warrant study for its own sake. It was not until 1932 that an Honours program was introduced and a statutory Chair of Geography was established associated with a Fellowship at Hertford College. With support from the RGS, and despite having no previous experience of university life, Mason was elected to the new chair and became the first statutory professor at the University of Oxford from 1 May 1932. His first task was to establish regulations for the new school which were published in 1932. The first Honour examinations were held the following year and by 1937 student numbers had reached 30 undergraduates.

Mason's academic work, linked to the Himalayan Journal which he had founded in 1929, addressed the challenge of naming ranges in the Karakoram region (specifically, the Baltoro Muztagh).

In 1940 Mason was contacted by Ian Fleming (who later wrote the famous James Bond stories) and Rear Admiral John Henry Godfrey about the preparation of reports on the geography of countries involved in military operations. These reports were the precursors of the Naval Intelligence Division Geographical Handbook Series produced between 1941 and 1946. Mason directed a team of academics at Oxford who contributed around half of what was, at the time, one of the largest geographic projects ever attempted.

Kenneth Mason retired from his chair at Oxford in 1953 but continued to write and give lectures on topics relating to the exploration of the Himalaya into his retirement. His final major work, Abode of Snow: A History of Himalayan Exploration And Mountaineering, was written shortly after the triumph of the 1953 British Mount Everest expedition and presents a comprehensive history of Himalayan exploration up to the first confirmed ascent of Mount Everest by Sir Edmund Hillary and Tenzing Norgay.

== Works ==
- Exploration of the Shaksgam Valley and Aghil Ranges, 1926 (1928)
- Routes in the Western Himalaya, Kashmir, & c. Vol. I Punch, Kashmir & Ladakh (1929)
- French West Africa British Naval Intelligence Division Geographical Handbook Series (1943)
- Italy British Naval Intelligence Division Geographical Handbook Series (1944)
- Iraq and the Persian Gulf British Naval Intelligence Division Geographical Handbook Series (1944)
- Western Arabia and the Red Sea British Naval Intelligence Division Geographical Handbook Series (1946)
- Abode of Snow (1955)

Mason also contributed obituaries for the Oxford Dictionary of National Biography for two fellow explorers:

- Charles Granville Bruce
- Henry Haversham Godwin-Austen
