= Hugh Ruttledge =

English civil servant and mountaineer

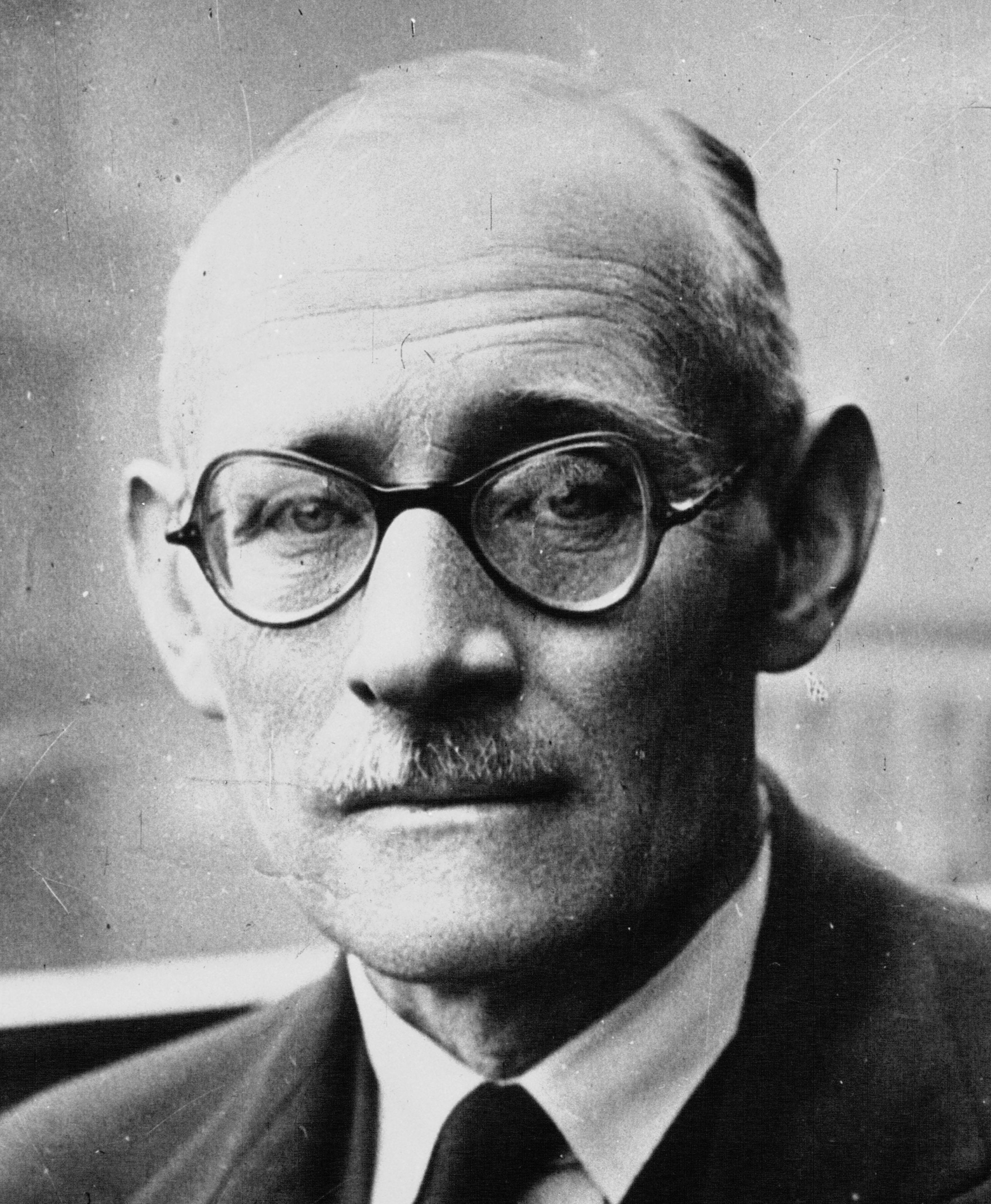
Hugh Ruttledge in 1936

Hugh Ruttledge (24 October 1884 – 7 November 1961) was an English civil servant and mountaineer who was the leader of two expeditions to Mount Everest in 1933 and 1936.

== Early life ==
The son of Lt.-Colonel Edward Butler Ruttledge, of the Indian Medical Service, and of his wife Alice Dennison, Ruttledge was educated at schools in Dresden and Lausanne and then at Cheltenham College. In 1903 he matriculated as an exhibitioner at Pembroke College, Cambridge, and in 1906 he took a second-class Honours degree in the Classical Honours tripos.

== India and mountaineering ==
Ruttledge passed the Indian Civil Service examination in 1908 and spent a year at the University of London studying Indian law, history and languages, before going out to India towards the end of 1909.

He was posted as an assistant in Roorkee and Sitapur, then was promoted a magistrate at Agra. He played polo and took part in field sports including big game-hunting until in 1915 a fall from a horse left him with a curved spine and a compacted hip. Also in 1915, he married Dorothy Jessie Hair Elder at Agra, with whom he had one son and two daughters.

In 1917, Ruttledge transferred to Lucknow as city magistrate and in 1921 became deputy commissioner there. In 1921, while on leave in Europe, he took up climbing in the Alps.

In 1925, he went as deputy commissioner to Almora in the foothills of the Himalaya, and within sight of some of its great peaks. Despite his injuries, Ruttledge was still able to climb, and he made up his mind to get to know every part of his district. With his wife he began to explore the glaciers and peaks on India's northern frontier.

The highest peak in the British Empire was then Nanda Devi, ringed around by a series of peaks above 21,000 feet (6,400 m), so that it had hardly been approached. In 1925, with Colonel R. C. Wilson of the Indian Army and Howard Somervell, the Ruttledges scouted the area to the north-east of the great mountain, hoping to find an approach to it by Milam and the Timphu glacier; they eventually concluded that this would be too hazardous.

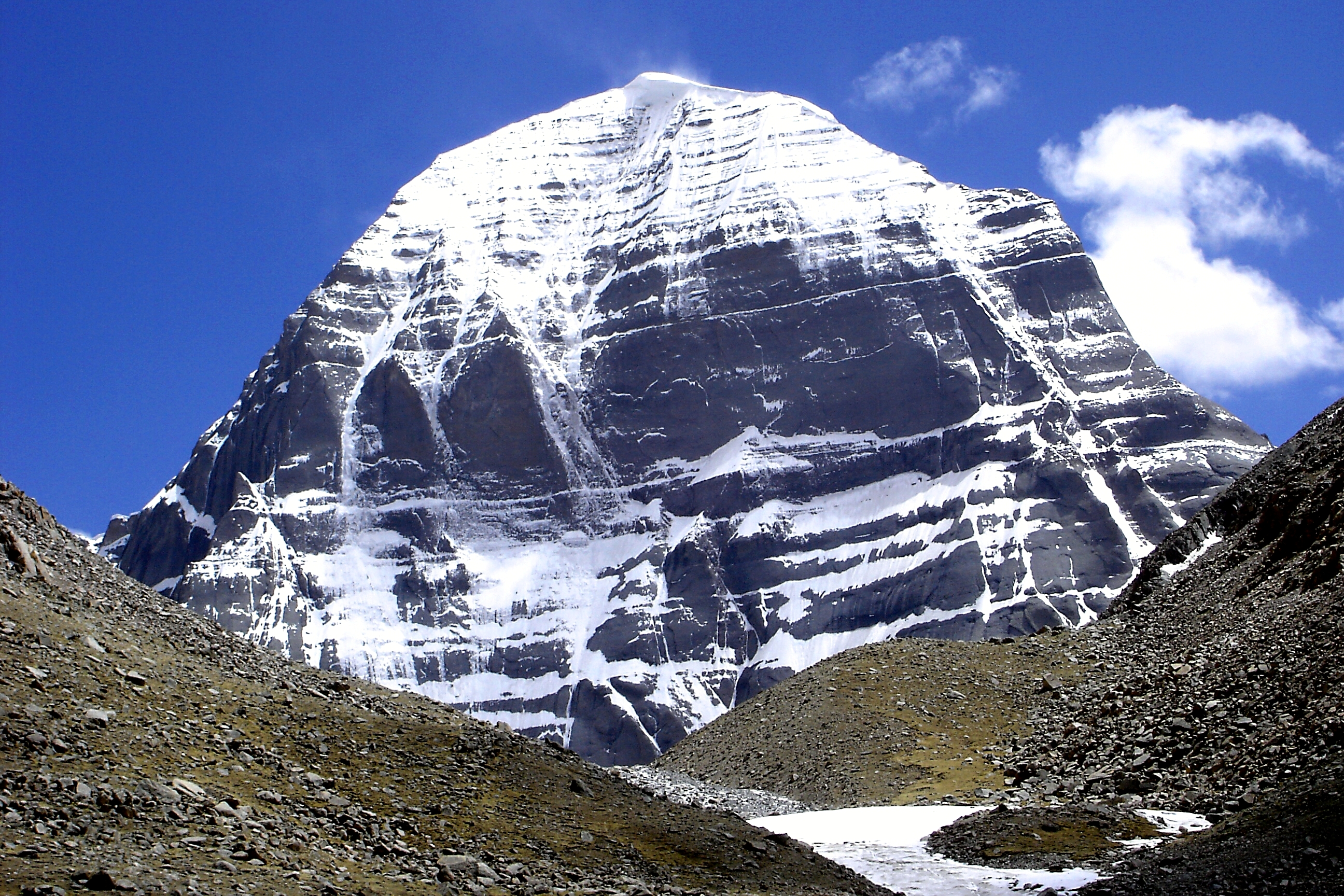
Northern side of Mount Kailas

Together with his wife, he completed the pilgrim circuit of Mount Kailas in July 1926, his wife being the first Western woman to perform this ceremony.

Ruttledge was in Tibet on official business, but because the official whom he was expecting to see, the senior Garpon of Gartok, was detained elsewhere, Ruttledge and his wife decided to make the Kailas parikrama, whilst Wilson (who accompanied them on the trip) and a Sherpa called Satan (sic) explored the various approaches to the mountain. Ruttledge considered the north face of Kailas to be 6,000 ft (1,800 m) high and 'utterly unclimbable'.

He contemplated an ascent of the mountain via the north-east ridge but decided that he did not have sufficient time; on returning to Almora he wrote that he had enjoyed 'some 600 miles (970 km) of enjoyable trekking, performed entirely on foot to the scandal of right-thinking Indians and Tibetans'. Ruttledge and his wife also made the first known crossing of Traill's Pass between Nanda Devi and Nanda Kot.

In 1927, with T. G. Longstaff and supported by Sherpas, Ruttledge reconnoitred the Nandakini valley and crossed a high pass between Trisul and Nanda Ghunti.

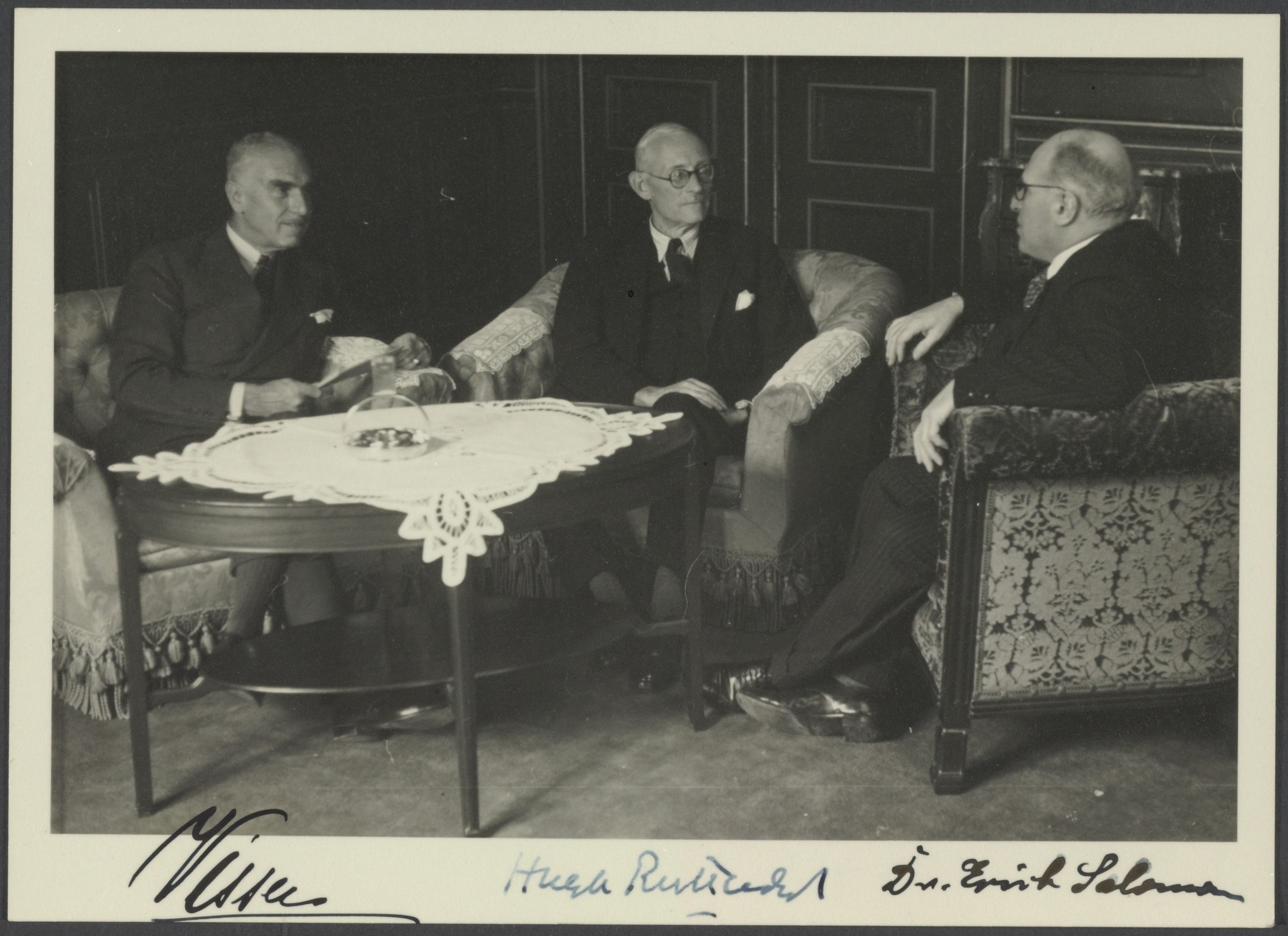
(Left to right) Diplomat and glaciologist Philips Christiaan Visser, Ruttledge and photographer Erich Salomon (1930)

Although Longstaff reported that the many peoples of Ruttledge's district had great respect for him, Ruttledge took early retirement from the Indian Civil Service in 1929. Somervell commented that "He was so tired of making plans that he knew to be right, to find that the Government always thought they knew better than the man on the spot". By the time of his retirement, Ruttledge and his wife had crossed twelve different high passes.

Ruttledge attempted to reach Nanda Devi three times in the 1930s and failed each time. In a letter to The Times he wrote that 'Nanda Devi imposes on her votaries an admission test as yet beyond their skill and endurance', adding that gaining the Nanda Devi Sanctuary alone was more difficult than reaching the North Pole.

== 1933 Everest expedition ==
In 1933 permission was granted to the British by the authorities in Tibet for a further attempt on the mountain. The Mount Everest Committee's task of finding a leader for this, the fourth British expedition, was made difficult by the incapacity of Charles Granville Bruce (the leader of previous British expeditions to the mountain), and the unwillingness of Major Geoffrey Bruce and Brigadier E. F. Norton to assume the role. As Ruttledge wrote, 'it was necessary to find someone with experience of Himalayan peoples as well as with mountaineering knowledge, and eventually the lot fell upon me'.

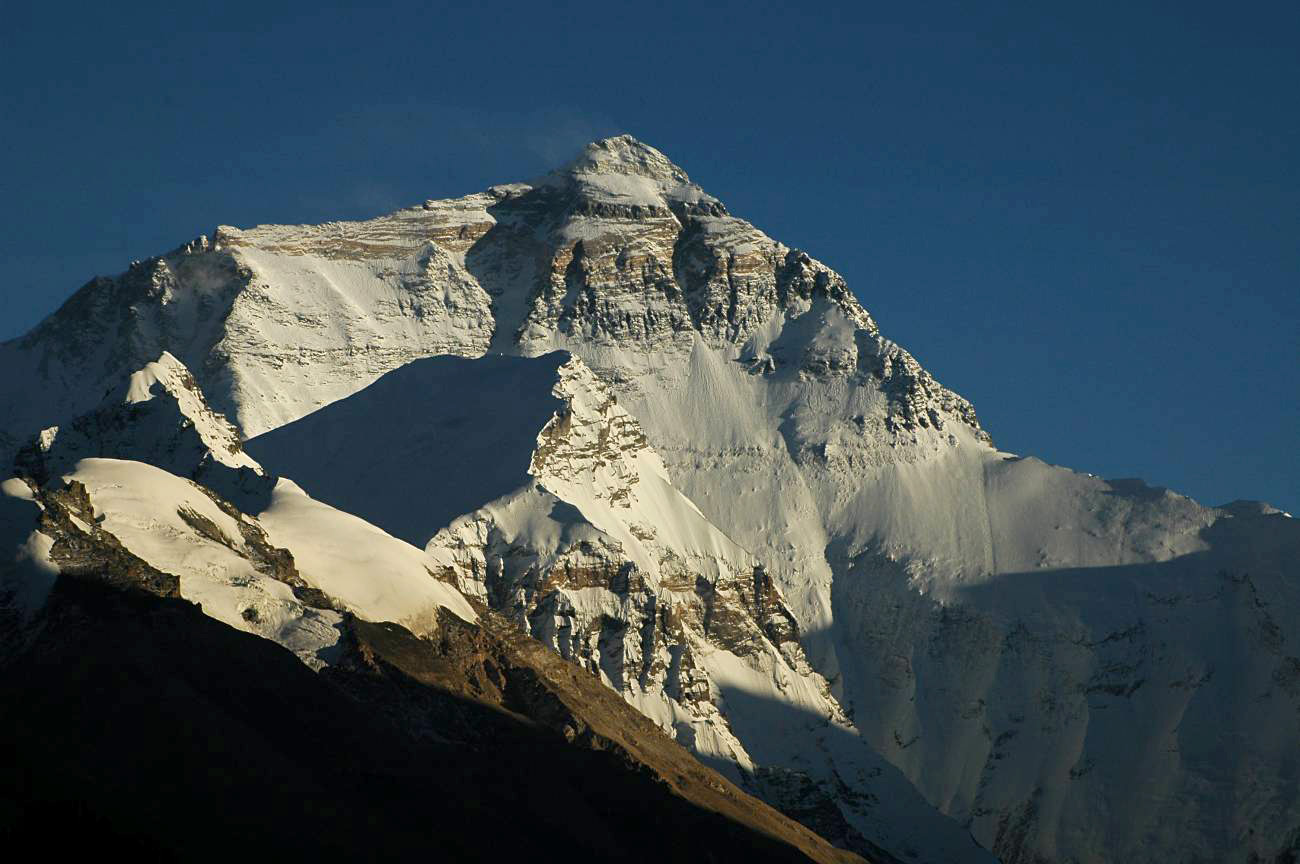
The northern side of Mount Everest, scene of British attempts in the 1920s and 1930s

The personnel for this attempt, which used the then-standard route of choice of the British via the North Col, was made up of a combination of military types and Oxbridge graduates, and included none of those who had been on the 1924 attempt. The full British complement was Frank Smythe, Eric Shipton, Jack Longland, Eugene Birnie, Percy Wyn-Harris, Edward Shebbeare, Lawrence Wager, George Wood-Johnson, Hugh Boustead, Colin Crawford, Tom Brocklebank, E. Thompson and William Maclean, with Raymond Greene as senior doctor and William 'Smidge' Smyth-Windham as chief radio operator.

The highest point attained on this attempt was 8,570 m (28,116 f), but the route was found to be too difficult and the vital camp V that should have been reached on a rare day with fair weather – 20 May – was, as a result of disagreements between team members, never established. It was during this expedition that Wyn-Harris found the ice axe which belonged to Andrew Irvine, who had disappeared on the peak on the 1924 British Expedition with George Mallory.

One of the men rejected for this expedition was Tenzing Norgay, who made the first ascent of Everest in 1953 with Sir Edmund Hillary. Fortunately, Ruttledge had the foresight to hire Tenzing to come with him to Everest in 1936.

In 1934 Ruttledge was awarded a Royal Geographical Society Founder's Medal; his citation read 'For his journeys in the Himalayas and his leadership of the Mount Everest Expedition, 1933.' Although the Mount Everest committee set up an inquiry into the reasons for the failure of the expedition, Ruttledge was not blamed, almost all members of the expedition expressing their admiration and fondness for him.

== Publicity ==
Following the 1933 expedition H.J. Cave & Sons used the fact that their Osilite trunks had been carried on the expedition as marketing. Following the success of this many other companies looked at sponsoring further attempts.

== 1936 Everest expedition ==
With the near-universal support for his leadership on the 1933 trip, Ruttledge was selected to lead a second expedition (the sixth British expedition), which was the largest to date to attempt Everest. Alongside veterans of the 1933 expedition – Frank Smythe, Eric Shipton and Percy Wyn-Harris – team members were Charles Warren, Edmund Wigram, Edwin Kempson, Peter Oliver, James Gavin, John Morris and Gordon Noel Humphreys. William Smyth-Windham was again chief radio operator. Although the North Col was reached, a combination of high winds, storms and waist-deep snow made progress above 7,000 m difficult and, with the monsoon arriving early, Ruttledge called off the expedition.

Tenzing Norgay wrote of Ruttledge and the 1936 expedition:

Mr Ruttledge was too old to be a high climber, but he was a wonderful man, gentle and warm-hearted, and all the Sherpas were very glad to be with him. This was a very big expedition, with more sahibs than there had ever been before, and a total of sixty Sherpas, which was five times as many as in 1935.

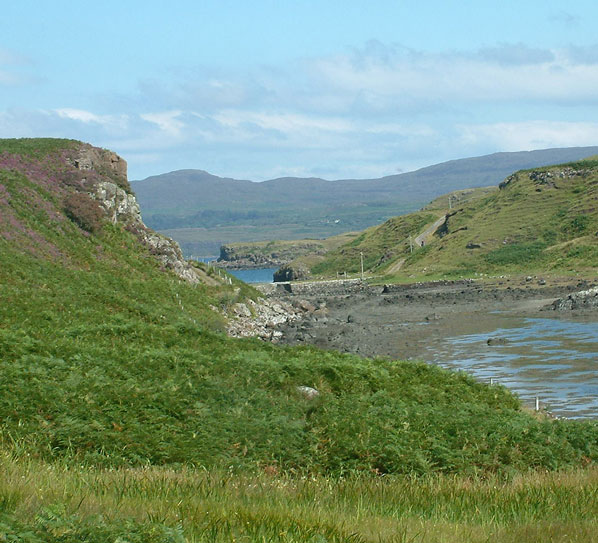
The island of Gometra (left), connected to the island of Ulva (right) by a bridge

== Later life ==
In 1932 Ruttledge planned a life as a farmer and to this end bought the island of Gometra in the Inner Hebrides, just off the west coast of Mull. Upon returning from the 1936 expedition to Everest he decided that a life at sea would be preferable, and he bought several boats – a 42-foot (13 m) converted Watson lifeboat and later a larger sailing cutter – to pursue this idea. In 1950 he moved ashore, buying a house on the edge of Dartmoor.

Ruttledge died in Stoke, Plymouth, on 7 November 1961.

== Bibliography ==
- Ruttledge, Hugh, Everest: The Unfinished Adventure, Hodder and Staughton, 1937
- Salkeld, Audrey, 'Ruttledge, Hugh (1884–1961)', in Oxford Dictionary of National Biography
