= Himalayan Journal =

Indian magazine

The Himalayan Journal
- Editor: Nandini Purandare
- Categories: Climbing, mountaineering
- Frequency: Annual
- Publisher: Himalayan Club
- Founded: 1929
- Country: India
- Website: himalayanclub.org/journal

The Himalayan Journal is the annual magazine of the Himalayan Club in India.

== History and profile ==
The magazine was established in 1929. The first editor-in-chief was the English geographer Kenneth Mason. He was a surveyor operating from Shimla. Mason later continued editing from England. Subsequent editors were C.W.F. Noyce, H.W. Tobin, and Trevor Braham. In 1960, K. Biswas took over as the first Indian editor. From 1969 to 1979 and from 1987 to 1989 Soli S. Mehta was editor. Harish Kapadia was editor from 1980 to 1986 and again from 1990 to 2010. Since 2014, Nandini Purandare has been the editor, the first woman to hold this post.

== Editors ==
The following persons have been editor-in-chief of the magazine:

- Kenneth Mason (1929–1940)
- C.W.F. Noyce (1946)
- H.W. Tobin (1947–1957)
- Trevor H. Braham (1958–1959)
- Dr. K. Biswas (1960–1968)
- Soli S. Mehta (1969–1979 and 1987–1989)
- Harish Kapadia (1980–1986, 1990–2014)
- Nandini Purandare (2014-present)
