= Colin Crawford (mountaineer) =

British mountaineer (1890–1959)

Colin Grant Crawford
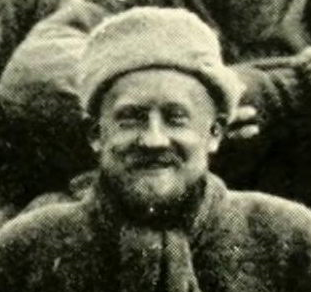
- Born: 3 June 1890
- Died: 15 August 1959 (aged 69); Rosemarkie, Scotland
- Education: Trinity Hall, Cambridge
- Occupations: Civil servant, mountaineer
- Known for: 1922 British Mount Everest Expedition, 1933 British Mount Everest expedition
- Spouse: Margaret MacIver (m. 1940)

Colin Grant Crawford (3 June 1890 – 15 August 1959) was a British mountaineer and civil servant. He was a part of the 1922 British Mount Everest expedition led by Charles Granville Bruce, and won the Olympic gold medal for alpinism in 1924 along with other team members.

Crawford was educated at Clifton College and Trinity Hall, Cambridge. He served in the Indian Civil Service between 1914 and 1930.

He was an experienced mountaineer. With Harold Raeburn he reconnoitred the world’s third highest mountain, Kanchenjunga, in 1920. He was a member of the 1922 Mount Everest expedition, serving as a transport officer. He was also a member of the 1933 British Mount Everest expedition led by Hugh Ruttledge, and extracts of his diary for that expedition were published in the Alpine Journal.

In 1940, he married Margaret MacIver of Aberdeen, with whom he had two daughters. He died in 1959, reportedly while playing cricket.

His nickname was "Ferdie", for his resemblance to Tsar Ferdinand I of Bulgaria.
