= Edward Oswald Shebbeare =

British mountaineer and forester (1884-1964)

- E.O. Shebbeare in the 1930s
- Born: 3 March 1884; England
- Died: 11 August 1964 (aged 80); England
- Occupation: Forester
- Writing career
- Genre: Natural history

Edward Oswald Shebbeare (3 March 1884 – 11 August 1964) was a British mountaineer, naturalist and forester who served in the Imperial Forest Service. He was a member of the 1924 British Mount Everest expedition and the deputy leader and transport officer of the 1933 expedition. He also served as transport officer on the 1929 German Kanchenjunga expedition. In 1928, he was a founding member of The Himalayan Club.Edward was also a keen naturalist, particularly interested in rhinoceros and elephant conservation. In 1940, he was the founding president of the Malayan Nature Society.

== Life ==
Shebbeare was born in Yorkshire, son of reverend C.H. Shebbeare, vicar of Wykeham. He was educated at Charterhouse School and then trained at the Royal Indian Engineering College, Cooper's Hill from 1903 to 1906.

He then joined the Imperial Forestry Service on 5 November 1906, eventually becoming chief conservator of forests for Bengal. He was also particularly active in wildlife conservation, securing legal protection for the Indian rhinoceros. In the 1930s, Shebbeare helped the Swedish nature photographer Bengt Berg carry out a pioneering camera-trap expedition to photograph the wildlife of Bengal (a photograph by Berg illustrates this article).

In 1938, after leaving India, Shebbeare was appointed Chief Game Warden of British Malaya. In 1942, Shebbeare's bungalow containing his library and diaries was looted by the invading Japanese army. During the Japanese occupation of Malaya Shebbeare planned to fight as a guerrilla with Spencer Chapman. However, he was imprisoned in Singapore. After the war he resumed his position as Game Warden, eventually retiring to England in 1947.

On his participation on the Mount Everest expeditions, he said "they only took me because I knew and liked the porters (Sherpas and Tibetans), not because I could climb".

He married Arabie Anne Cameron (d. 1962) in 1916 and they had a daughter.

== Publications ==
Shebbeare wrote a novel, Soondar Mooni, from the unusual perspective of an Indian elephant. He also wrote several scientific papers on forestry in India, as well as on wildlife conservation.

=== Other papers ===
- Shebbeare, E.O., 1947. The Senoi of Malaya. Man, 168.
- Shebbeare, E.O., Roy, A.N. and Tyndale, H., 1948. The Great one-horned rhinoceros (Rhinoceros unicornis L). Jour. Bengal Nat. Hist. Soc, 22(3).
- Shebbeare, E.O. and Rao, V.S., 1958. Soondar Mooni. Indian Forester, 84(11), pp. 693–696.
