= The Himalayan Club =

Alpine club in India that publishes the Himalayan Journal

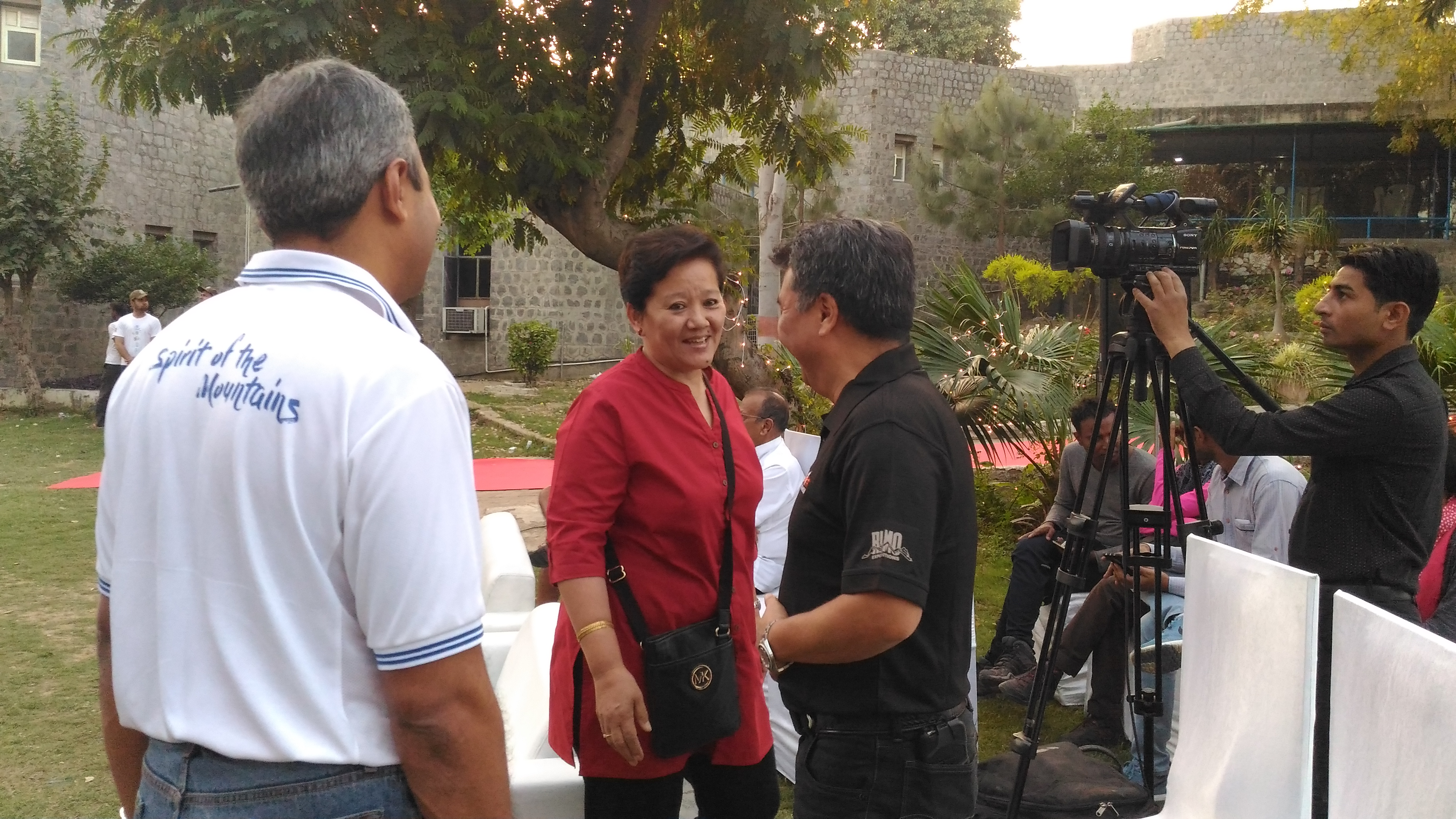
Mountaineer Divyesh Muni (VP of Himalayan club in 2017), Rita Gombu (Daughter of Mountaineer late Nawang Gombu) and Motup Chewang (VP of Himalayan club in 2017) at the 2017 Banff Mountain Film Festival venue IMF Delhi

The Himalayan Club is an organization founded in India in 1928 along the lines of the Alpine Club. The stated mission of the organization was "to encourage and assist Himalayan travel and exploration, and to extend knowledge of the Himalaya and adjoining mountain ranges through science, art, literature and sport." The Club publishes a journal, the Himalayan Journal and has a library. Nandini Purandare from Mumbai is the current president of The Himalayan Club.

== History ==
The idea to start such an organization was proposed in 1866 by Mr. F. Drew and Mr. W. H. Johnson to the Asiatic Society of Bengal. Douglas Freshfield, active member of the Royal Geographical Society wrote in the Alpine Journal in 1884, "The formation at Calcutta or Simla," he said, "of (a) Himalayan Club, prepared to publish Narratives of Science and Adventure' concerning the mountains, would be the most serviceable means to this end." The organization was finally established on 17 February 1928 in the office of Field Marshal Sir William Birdwood. A library was established at Shimla. Some of the 127 founding members were:

- Sir G. L. Corbett, Secretary for Commerce and Industry;
- Major Kenneth Mason of the Survey of India
- Mr. T. E. T. Upton, Solicitor to the Government of India
- Major General Walter Kirke, acting Chief of the General Staff
- Brigadier E. A. Tandy, Surveyor General of India
- The Viceroy, Edward Frederick Lindley Wood
- Field Marshal Sir William Birdwood, Commander in Chief
- Sir Malcolm Hailey, Governor of the Punjab
- Sir Edwin Pascoe, Director of the Geological Survey of India
- Major General Kenneth Wigram
- Brigadier W. L. O. Twiss
- Mr. G. Mackworth Young, Army Secretary
- Mr. J. G. Acheson, Deputy Foreign Secretary
- Major E. O. Wheeler of the Survey of India;
- Captain J. G. Bruce, 6th Gurkha Rifles
- Edward Oswald Shebbeare, of the Indian Forest Service

The membership of the organization grew from 250 in 1928 to 572 in 1946. A library was initially established in Shimla at United Service Institution of India but moved to the Survey of India and in 1932 to New Delhi. In 1947, most of the British members left India but continued to be members. With more members in Calcutta, it was managed from there and the library moved from the Army headquarters to the Calcutta Light Horse Club in 1948. In 1958 the library moved to the Geological Survey of India and in 1966 it moved to the National Library of India in Calcutta. In 1971, it moved back to New Delhi where it was housed in the Central Secretariat and before moving to the Indian International Centre in 1976 where it continues to be located.

== Presidents emeritus ==
- Jagdish Nanavati (2000-2012)
- Dr. M.S. Gill (2013-present)
- Harish Kapadia (2013-present)
