= Frank Smythe =

English mountaineer (1900–1949)

- Born: 6 July 1900; Maidstone, Kent
- Died: 27 June 1949 (aged 48); London
- Occupations: botanist, explorer, mountaineer photographer, writer

Francis Sydney Smythe, better known as Frank Smythe or F. S. Smythe (6 July 1900 – 27 June 1949), was an English mountaineer, author, photographer and botanist. He is best remembered for his mountaineering in the Alps as well as in the Himalayas, where he identified a region that he named the "Valley of Flowers", now a protected park. His ascents include two new routes on the Brenva Face of Mont Blanc, Kamet, and attempts on Kangchenjunga and Mount Everest in the 1930s. It was said that he had a tendency for irascibility, something some of his mountaineering contemporaries said "decreased with altitude".

== Biography ==
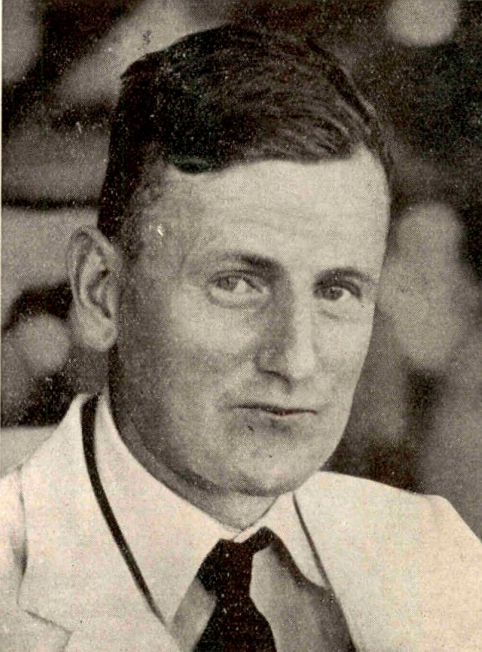
c. 1937

Smythe was born at Maidstone in Kent and educated in Switzerland after an initial period at Berkhamsted School. He trained as an electrical engineer and worked for brief periods with the Royal Air Force and Kodak before devoting himself to writing and public lecturing. Smythe enjoyed mountaineering, photography, collecting plants, and gardening; he toured as a lecturer; and he wrote a total of twenty seven books. Smythe's focused approach is well documented, not only through his own writings, but by his contemporaries and later works.

Among his many public lectures, Smythe gave several to the Royal Geographical Society, his first in 1931 titled "Explorations in Garhwal around Kamet" and his second in 1947 titled "An Expedition to the Lloyd George Mountains, North-East British Columbia".

Smythe wrote several books that saw commercial success, including The Kangchenjunga Adventure.

During the Second World War, over the winter of 1943-44, he was posted to Jasper National Park in the Canadian Rockies as a mountaineer training officer for the Lovat Scouts but early in 1944 he was hospitalised with appendicitis so for 2 months he was not involved with the training. He also served in Braemar, Scotland, where he led the Commando Mountain and Snow Warfare Centre, and where John Hunt worked for a while with him as an instructor. He went on to write two books about climbing in the Rockies, Rocky Mountains (1948) and Climbs in the Canadian Rockies (1951). Mount Smythe (10,650 ft) was named in his honour.

In his autobiography "Man of Everest", Tenzing Norgay reports that in the spring of 1949 Smythe visited Darjeeling – they had climbed on Everest together in 1938. Tenzing describes how Smythe "was not the same as before", he had trouble remembering his name and thinking it was October and then December when it was actually May, demanding an ice axe when walking on grass covered slopes. Tenzing says he was soon after flown back to England but died; "so the life of one of the finest of all mountaineers came to a sad and too early end".

In 1949, in Delhi, he was taken ill with food poisoning; then a succession of malaria attacks took their toll. He died on 27 June 1949, at age 48.

== Mountaineering ==
- 1927 and 1928 Smythe, together with T. Graham Brown, made the first ascent of two routes on the Brenva Face of Mont Blanc, the Sentinelle Rouge and Route Major. These were the first routes to be put up on the face.
- 1930 Smythe was a member of the international team (Germany, Austria, Switzerland and Great Britain), to attempt Kangchenjunga, under the leadership of Günter Dyhrenfurth.
- 1931 Smythe was the leader of the first successful expedition to climb Kamet (7,756 m) in 1931, at the time it was the highest peak yet climbed. During the Kamet expedition Smythe and R. L. Holdsworth discovered what they called the Valley of Flowers in the Himalaya, now in the state of Uttarakhand, India.
- 1933 Smythe was a member of Hugh Ruttledge's Everest expedition.
- 1936 Smythe was again a member of Hugh Ruttledge's 2nd Everest Expedition.
- 1938 Smythe was a member of the Mount Everest expedition led by Bill Tilman.

== Bibliography ==
The following is a list of the books written by Smythe;

- Climbs and Ski Runs (1930) Blackwood, Edinburgh
- The Kangchenjunga Adventure (1930) Gollanz, London
- Kamet Conquered (1932) Gollanz, London
- An Alpine Journey (1934) Hodder, London
- The Spirit of the Hills (1935) Hodder, London
- Over Tyrolese Hills (1936) Hodder, London
- Camp Six (1937) Hodder, London
- The Valley of Flowers (1938) Hodder, London
- Peaks and Flowers of the Central Himalayas (1938, The Geographical Magazine article)
- The Mountain Scene (1937) A&C Black
- Peaks and Valleys (1938) A&C Black
- A Camera in the Hills (1939) A&C Black
- Mountaineering Holiday (1940) Hodder, London
- Edward Whymper (1940) Hodder, London
- My Alpine Album (1940) A&C Black
- Adventures of a Mountaineer (1940) Dent
- The Mountain Vision (1941) Hodder, London
- Over Welsh Hills (1941) A&C Black
- Alpine Ways (1942) A&C Black
- Secret Mission (1942) Hodder and Stoughton, London
- British Mountaineers (1942) Collins
- Snow on the hills (1946) A&C Black
- The Mountain Top (1947) St Hugh's Press
- Again Switzerland (1947) Hodder, London
- Rocky Mountains (1948) A&C Black
- Swiss Winter (1948) A&C Black
- Mountains in Colour (1949) Max Parrish
- Climbs in the Canadian Rockies (1950) Hodder, London

Many were subsequently republished in the USA, some of the best have been gathered into collections.
