= Noel Odell =

British geologist and mountain climber (1890–1987)

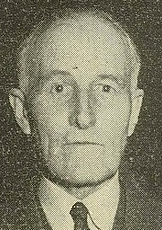
- Noel Odell in 1953
- Born: 25 December 1890; St Lawrence, Isle of Wight
- Died: 21 February 1987 (aged 96); Cambridge, England
- Education: Royal School of Mines, Imperial College and Clare College, Cambridge
- Occupation: Geologist
- Known for: First ascent of Nanda Devi, last sighting of Mallory on Everest, 1924
- Awards: FRSE (1944)

Noel Ewart Odell FRSE FGS (25 December 1890 – 21 February 1987) was an English geologist and mountaineer. In 1924 he was an oxygen officer on the Everest expedition in which George Mallory and Andrew Irvine famously perished during their summit attempt. Odell spent two weeks living above 23,000 feet (7,000 m), and twice climbed to 26,800 feet (8,200 m) and higher, all without supplemental oxygen. In 1936, Odell with Bill Tilman climbed Nanda Devi, at the time the highest mountain climbed.

== Early life ==
He was born at St Lawrence, Isle of Wight, the son of Rev Robert William Odell and his wife, Mary Margaret Ewart.

He was educated at Brighton College and the Royal School of Mines, Imperial College. He received a doctorate (PhD) from Cambridge University.

He was an accomplished rock climber, joining the Alpine Club in 1916 and famous for his solo first ascent in 1919 of Tennis Shoe on the Idwal Slabs (Rhiwiau Caws) in Snowdonia. Odell Gully in the Huntington Ravine of New Hampshire's Mount Washington is named after Odell, who was the first to accomplish its ascent in winter. After the war, he took part in the 1921 Oxford University Spitsbergen expedition with Tom Longstaff and others.

== Everest 1924 ==
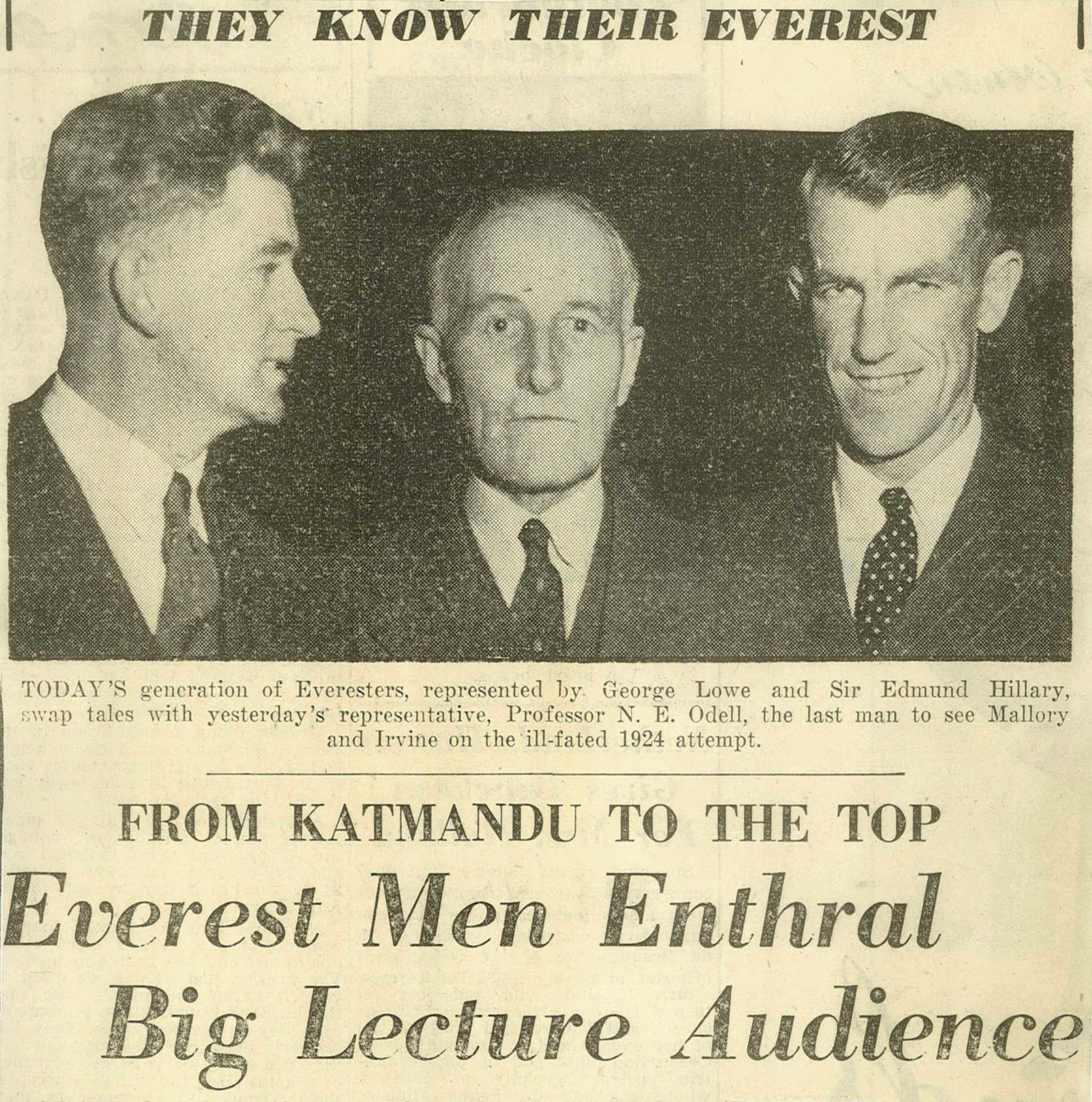
21 August 1953, Evening Post news clipping for the state reception for Edmund Hillary (right) and fellow mountaineer George Lowe (left) on their return from Everest with Odell (center)

On 8 June 1924 George Mallory and Andrew Irvine attempted to climb to the top of Mount Everest via the Northeast Ridge route. Keen-sighted Odell reported seeing them at 12:50 p.m. ascending one of the major "steps" on the North-East ridge, "the last step but one from the base of the final pyramid" and "going strongly for the top." But no evidence thus far has proved that they reached the summit, or that they ascended above the major Second Step. They never returned and perished on the mountain. Odell was the last person to see the pair alive.

In his first two accounts, written between June and November 1924, Odell was certain he had seen Mallory and Irvine climbing the Second Step. (Note: Another black spot became apparent and moved up the snow to join the other on the crest. The first then approached the great rock-step and shortly emerged at the top; the second did likewise. Then the whole fascinating vision vanished, enveloped in cloud once more.....The place on the ridge mentioned is a prominent rock-step at a very short distance from the base of the final pyramid p. 16) (Note: I noticed far away on a snow-slope leading up to the last step but one from the base of the final pyramid, a tiny object moving and approaching the rock step. p. 457) But in the expedition account published in 1925, and after mounting scepticism from members of the climbing community as to whether it was the Second Step or the lower First Step, Odell conceded it might have been the First Step where he had seen the pair. (Note: Owing to the small portion of the summit ridge uncovered I could not be precisely certain at which of these two "steps" they were, as in profile and from below they are very similar, but at the time I took it for the upper "second step." p. 130) (Note: Owing to the foreshortening of the view, however, which incidentally for a short time was quite clear of cloud, I could not be certain whether it were the First or the Second Step. p. 448) After he had been rejected as too old for the next Everest expedition, he recanted his change of mind and returned to the belief that he had seen the two climbers surmount the Second Step. (Note: Odell remains convinced that he saw both Mallory and Irvine on a snow-slope near the foot of the second step, much farther along, and Mallory actually on the top of the second step itself. p.40) Had they done so, there would have been a fair chance that one of them, at least, might have reached the summit.

Mallory's body and personal effects were discovered in 1999, and Irvine's partial remains were found in 2024, exactly 100 years after he was last seen heading for the summit in Mallory's company.

== Achievements ==
In 1936 Odell with Bill Tilman successfully reached the summit of Nanda Devi which at the time, and until 1950, was the highest mountain climbed. Odell returned to Everest with the expedition led by Tilman in 1938.

Odell had a colourful career outside mountaineering as well, serving with the Royal Engineers in both World Wars, as a consultant in the petroleum and mining industries, and teaching geology at a number of universities around the world, including Harvard and Cambridge. He was Professor of Geology at the University of Otago in New Zealand and Peshawar University in Pakistan.

In 1944 he was elected a Fellow of the Royal Society of Edinburgh. His proposers were Sir James Wordie, George Tyrrell, Sir Arthur Trueman and John Weir.

== Family ==
In 1917 he married Gwladys Mona Jones (1891-1977). Mona was also a climber and was a long standing member of the Ladies' Alpine Club, having joined in 1921 and remained a member until her death.

== Publications ==
- The Geology of the Eastern Parts of Central Spitzbergen (1927)
- Geological and some other Observations in the Mount Everest Region (1938)
- The Petrography of the Franz Josef Fjord Region (1955)

== Legacy ==
- In the 2010 documentary film about Mallory's expedition, The Wildest Dream, Alan Rickman acts as the voice of Noel Odell.

== Sources ==
- George Band, ‘Odell, Noel Ewart (1890–1987)’, rev. Oxford Dictionary of National Biography, Oxford University Press, 2004; online edn, Oct 2006
