= Geoffrey Corbett =

British member of the Indian Civil Service and mountaineer

Sir Geoffrey Latham Corbett KBE CIE (9 February 1881 – November 1937) was a British member of the Indian Civil Service and a mountaineer. He held senior positions in the Governments of British India and the Kingdom of Egypt.

== Early life ==
The son of Frederick Corbett, of Chaddesley Corbett, Worcestershire, Corbett was educated at Bromsgrove School and was already a climber while still there. In 1898, when he was seventeen, he made his first climbing trip to Switzerland, visiting the central Alps and climbing the Grand Muveran, the Dent de Morcles, and peaks around Zermatt. In 1899 arrived as a classical scholar at Hertford College, Oxford, and in 1901 he made a second trip to the Alps, when he made a traverse of the Aiguilles Rouges, among other routes. While at Oxford he also climbed in Yorkshire and the Lake District, usually with his friend Alfred Barran. However, after taking a double first in Classics he entered the Indian Civil Service in 1905 and was lost to serious climbing for some years.

== Career ==
Corbett achieved fast promotion in India, with periods of leave which he used for climbing. In 1916 he was elected to the Alpine Club. In 1918, the last year of the Great War, he was appointed Director of Industries and Controller of Munitions in the Central Provinces. While there he explored the Satpuras and also visited Kashmir and Ladakh. In 1919 he was appointed as Deputy Secretary to the Government of India for Commerce and Industry, then went to Calcutta as Director-General of Commercial Intelligence. He attended the Washington Disarmament Conference of 1921–22, was sent on a mission to Fiji later in 1922, attended the Assembly of the League of Nations at Geneva in 1929, and was Secretary of the British Indian delegation to the Round Table Conferences of 1930 to 1932. In 1931 he was a temporary member of the Viceroy's Executive Council.

In 1921 he made a climbing trip to Switzerland with Henry Hayden and returned in 1922, 1925, and 1928, usually climbing with local guides. He also took up big game hunting.

In 1926 Corbett was at Simla as Secretary for Commerce and Industry in the Government of India, and his windows looked north towards the Himalayas. He began to plan the establishment of a Himalayan Club, an idea which was far from new, but he got the support of several important men. These included Lord Irwin, the Viceroy of India, who agreed to be a founder member, Field Marshal Sir William Birdwood, the Commander-in-Chief, India, who eventually became the first President; and Sir Malcolm Hailey, Governor of the Punjab. The Club was formally created in Birdwood's meeting room at Army Headquarters, Delhi, on 17 February 1928, with 127 founder members, and with Corbett himself as the first Honorary Secretary.

Due to a collapse in his health, Corbett left India in 1932 and returned to Oxford as Reader in Indian History, also becoming the Himalayan Club's representative on the Mount Everest Committee.

After Oxford, Corbett was appointed as Adviser to the Kingdom of Egypt's Ministry of Commerce and Industry in Cairo. In 1936 and 1937, he made expeditions to Switzerland, but died suddenly in Cairo in November 1937. At his own request he was buried at sea.

== Private life ==
In 1912, Corbett married Gladys Kate Bennett, who like him was from Worcestershire, and they had one son. Their home in England was at Bonson, Nether Stowey, Somerset. His nephew was the acclaimed British film director Michael Powell

== Honours ==
- Knight Commander of the Order of the British Empire (KBE), 1927 Birthday Honours
- Companion of the Order of the Indian Empire, 1921 New Year Honours
- Grand Cordon of the Order of the Nile
