= Gurdial Singh (mountaineer) =

Indian mountaineer (1924–2023)

Personal information
- Nationality: Indian
- Born: 1 January 1924
- Died: 30 May 2023 (aged 99) Chandigarh, India

Climbing career
- Major ascents: Led the first Indian expedition to Trisul (1951); First ascent of Mrigthuni (1958); Member of the first Indian expedition to Mount Everest (1965)

Gurdial Singh (1 January 1924 – 30 May 2023) was an Indian schoolteacher and mountaineer who led the first mountaineering expedition of independent India to Trisul (7,120 metres) in 1951. In 1958, he led the team that made the first ascent of Mrigthuni (6,855 metres). In 1965, he was a member of the first successful Indian expedition team to climb Mount Everest.

Singh also led many expeditions at The Doon School, where he was a geography teacher, and along with other Doon masters and students was instrumental in establishing a mountaineering culture in post-Independence India. Singh has been described as "the first true Indian mountaineer", and in 2020, the Himalayan Journal noted "Gurdial climbed for pleasure, to enjoy the mountains in the company of friends, to savour the beauty and grandeur of the high ranges, not to find fame or bag summits."

== Life and career ==
Gurdial Singh joined The Doon School in 1945 and it was here that he was influenced by Englishmen such as John Martyn, R.L. Holdsworth and Jack Gibson to take up mountaineering. The first headmaster of Doon Arthur Foot was a member of the Alpine Club. Together, they scaled many peaks including Bandarpunch, Trisul, Kamet, Abi Gamin and Nanda Devi. He was the first Indian member of the famed Alpine Club, which was "a club of English gentlemen devoted to mountaineering". In 1965, Singh was a member of the first Indian expedition to successfully climb Mount Everest. The expedition was led by Mohan Singh Kohli and Singh reached the South Col with the first group to attempt the summit.

Singh remained unmarried throughout his life, and often said that he was "married to the mountains". He died following complications due to a hip fracture and chikungunya at his home in Chandigarh, on 30 May 2023. Singh was 99.

== Awards ==
Apart from being the first Indian to be included in the Alpine Club, Singh was given the Arjuna Award in 1965 for his contributions towards Indian mountaineering. In 1967, Singh was awarded Padma Shri, the fourth highest civilian award in India. In 2007, Gurdial Singh was given a Lifetime Achievement Award and the Tenzing Norgay National Adventure Award for his contributions towards Indian mountaineering.

== See also ==
- Role of The Doon School in Indian mountaineering
