= Role of The Doon School in Indian mountaineering =

The role of The Doon School in Indian mountaineering describes the formative links between The Doon School, an all-boys boarding school in Dehradun, India, and early, post-Independence Indian mountaineering. From the 1940s onwards, Doon's masters and students like A.E. Foot, R.L. Holdsworth, J.A.K. Martyn, Gurdial Singh, Jack Gibson, Aamir Ali, Hari Dang, Nandu Jayal, were among the first to go on major Himalayan expeditions in a newly independent nation. These early expeditions contributed towards laying the foundation of mountaineering in an independent India. Mountaineer and chronicler Harish Kapadia wrote in his book Across Peaks & Passes in Garhwal Himalaya: "To my mind, it was when Gurdial Singh [then a Doon School master] climbed Trisul in 1951 that was the beginning of the age of mountaineering for Indians."

== History ==
Doon's founding British headmaster A.E. Foot and masters J.A.K. Martyn, R.L. Holdsworth and Jack Gibson were all Alpinists and introduced regular mountaineering expeditions for the boys during the school year. Located in the Doon Valley, in the foothills of the Himalayas, the school proved to be an ideal starting point for treks to the mountains. The British masters were joined by Gurdial Singh who led the first Indian expedition to Trisul in 1951 and was a member of the first Indian expedition to Mount Everest in 1965. Singh was accompanied by Narendra Dhar Jayal, then a student at Doon, who later went on to pioneer mountaineering in India and became, at Jawaharlal Nehru's behest, the founder principal of the Himalayan Mountaineering Institute. In an interview to Indian Express, the Indian mountaineer, author and editor of Himalayan Journal, Harish Kapadia stated, "There were very few Indians in the club initially [the Himalayan Club]. In 1947, when the British left, people thought that mountaineering and the club will not hold up in India. Then in 1951, a Doon School teacher, Gurdial Singh, and few others went on a trek to the Trisul peak in the Kumaon region. That’s how Indian mountaineering took off."

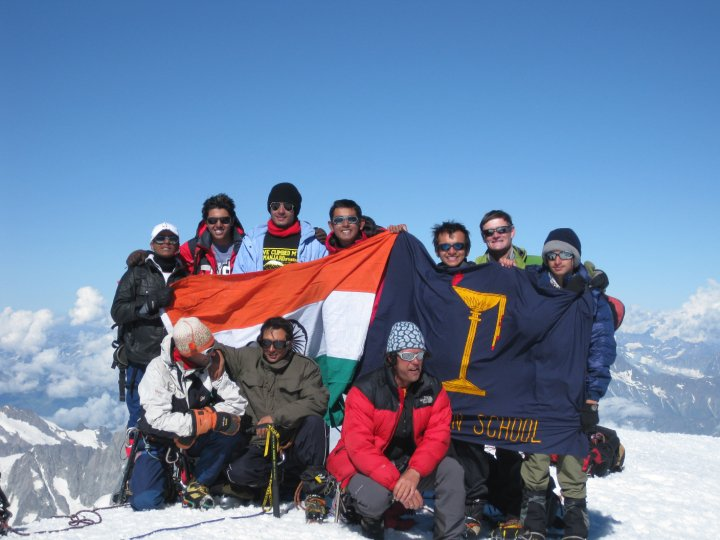
2012 Mont Blanc expedition

=== Western Garhwal ===
Kapadia describes in his book, Across Peaks & Passes in Garhwal Himalaya, how Doon's masters and pupils first explored the Western Garhwal region, which comprises peaks like Bandarpunch and Kalanag. In Tourism in Garhwal Himalaya, mountaineer Harshwanti Bisht further discusses the school's early expeditions to Badrinath, Kamet and Jaonli.

=== Present day ===
Doon's students and faculty continue the mountaineering tradition in the form of 'midterms', established by the British masters. Midway through each term, students go on treks in the Himalayas or abroad. Recent expeditions have been to Stok Kangri, Mont Blanc, Island Peak, Mount Everest base camp, Mount Kilimanjaro.

== Major expeditions ==
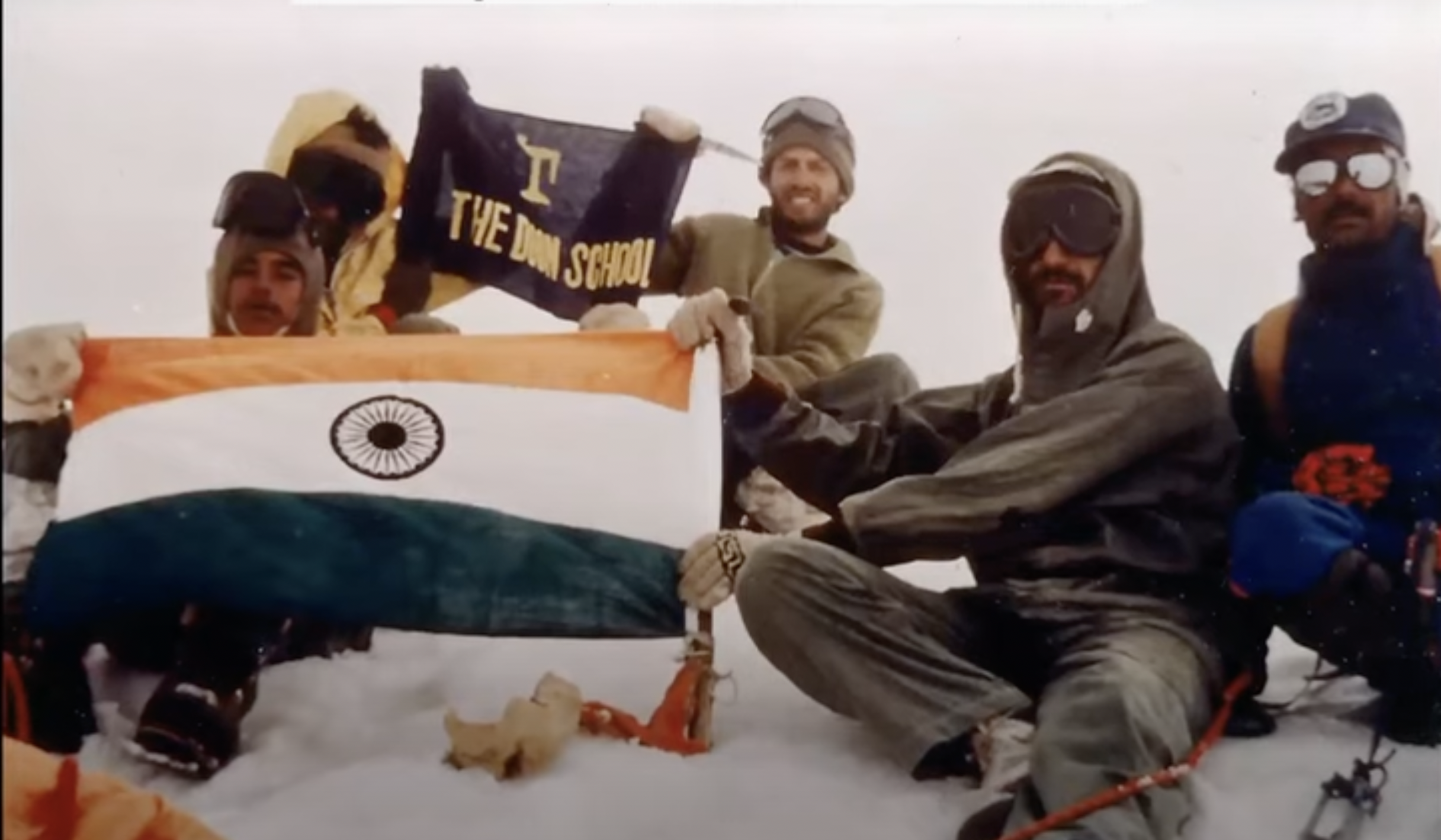
The 1984 expedition to Kalanag or Black Peak (6387m)

- 1946, 1950 – Bandarpunch (6316m). (In 1937, Gibson and Martyn climbed Bandarpunch along with Tenzing Norgay. Later, in his autobiography, Norgay would refer to Bandarpunch as the "Doon School mountain".)
- 1951 – Trisul (7120m) (First Indian expedition, led by the Doon master, Gurdial Singh)
- 1952 – Kamet (7756m)
- 1953, 1955 – Abi Gamin (7355m)
- 1955 - Kalanag (6387m) or 'Black Peak'. First ascent by Gibson and Doon's pupils.
- 1958 - Mrigthuni (6855m). First ascent by a team led by Gurdial Singh; Aamir Ali, another Doon master, was a member of the expedition.
- 1961 – Devistan I (6678m) Members included Gurdial Singh, Hari Dang, Suman Dubey
- 1961 – Nanda Devi (7816m, summit not reached). Members included masters Gurdial Singh, Hari Dang and former pupil Suman Dubey
- 1965 – Kalanag (6387m)
- 1965 - Jaonli (6632m), expedition led by Hari Dang
- 1984 - Kalanag (6387m) or 'Black Peak'
- 1996 - Kedar Dome (6832m), student expedition led by master S.C. Biala

== Bibliography ==
- Norgay, Tenzing (1955), Man of Everest – The Autobiography of Tenzing, Harrap UK, ISBN 9781447400288
- Bisht, Harshwanti (1994), Tourism in Garhwal Himalaya: With Special Reference to Mountaineering and Trekking in Uttarkashi and Chamoli Districts, Indus, ISBN 9788173870064
- Kapadia, Harish (1999), Across Peaks & Passes in Garhwal Himalaya, Indus, ISBN 9788173870972
- Anderson, Richard (2001), Climbing with the Doon School, Alpine Journal
- Kohli, M.S. (2002), Mountains of India: Tourism, Adventure and Pilgrimage, Indus, ISBN 9788173871351
- Futehally, Laaeq (2002), The Last Englishman: The Life and Times of Jack Gibson, Hachette UK, ISBN 9789350099698
