= Narendra Dhar Jayal =

Indian mountain climber (1927–1958)

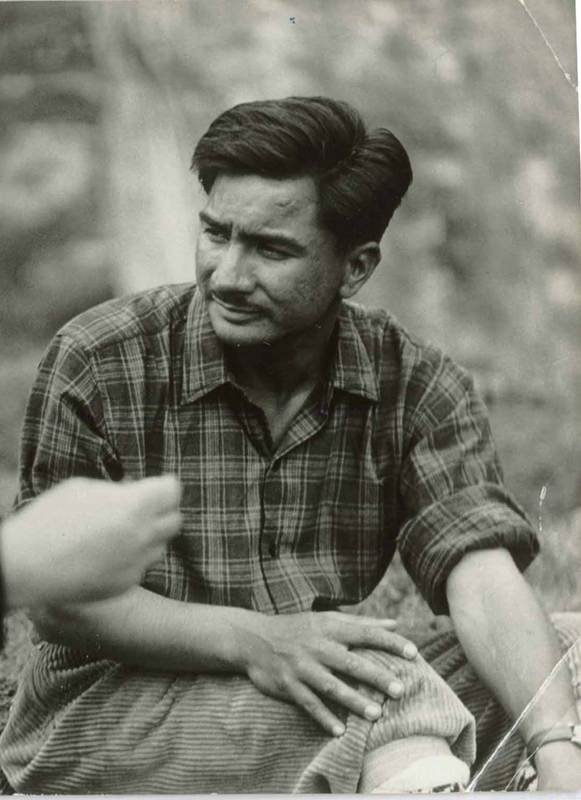
- Born: 25 June 1927
- Died: 28 April 1958 (aged 30)
- Other name: Nandu Jayal
- Occupation: Major
- Known for: Pioneering early Indian Mountaineering

Narendra Dhar Jayal (Nandu Jayal) (25 June 1927 – 28 April 1958) was an Indian mountaineer and an officer of the Bengal Sappers and the Indian Army Corps of Engineers. He is credited with pioneering and patronizing early post-Independence mountaineering in India, and was the founder principal of the Himalayan Mountaineering Institute. He encouraged the youth of India to take up mountaineering, and has been called the "Marco Polo of Indian Mountaineering".

== Education and early life ==
Nandu Jayal's father Pandit Chakra Dhar Jayal, was Diwan of the hill state of Tehri Garhwal. His brother was Vidhya Dhar Jayal, who became an army officer. Nandu and his cousin Nalni Dhar joined Doon school in 1935. Nandu stayed in the school for nine years, where he also became head of his House and captain of school boxing. In 1940 R. L. Holdsworth joined the Doon school as headmaster and became Nandu's housemaster. Nandu was fascinated with Holdsworth's interests in mountaineering and his mountaineering career started while he was a student at The Doon School, where his teachers encouraged his interest in climbing as a way to tame his somewhat unruly nature. He accompanied Holdsworth on many expeditions.

Jayal's first major expedition as a 16-year-old schoolboy was to the Awar Valley above Badrinath, reaching 6,000 meters. Other climbs, while still at Doon, included Trisul with Gurdial Singh, a teacher from Doon. While Singh went on to reach the peak of Trisul, where he performed a headstand asana to honor the Hindu god Shiva, Jayal noted his own feelings in lyrical terms: "The grass on which we camped was like a cushion sprinkled with tiny mauve primula and the gentle lapping of the running water recalled melodies from Beethoven’s Pastoral Symphony. I confess a desire to bring my efforts to an honourable conclusion here – as long as somebody got to the top – and revel in this bracing and saner altitude."

He left the school in December 1944 and was selected in the Army as he was given high rating by the selection committee board due to his outstanding interest in training subordinates. Doon transformed from a delinquent boy to a "gentle, perfect knight".

== Career ==
In 1948, Nandu Jayal went to Switzerland and acquired a Ski Teacher's Certificate, a very respectable achievement. He was appointed Chief Instructor at the Winter Warfare School, later known as the High Altitude and Winter Warfare School. Under the leadership of the Engineer-in-Chief, Maj. Gen. Harold 'Bill' Williams, himself an eager climber, Nandu Jayal organised the first Sappers expedition to Bandarpunch successfully in 1950. As a young Captain in 1950–51, he carried out a strategic reconnaissance of the Garhwal Himalayas and was later the Indian Army liaison officer for the French Expedition to Nanda Devi in 1951. He organised and led two expeditions to Kamet; the first in 1952 when the summit team was forced back by a blizzard from just 600 metres short of the mountain and later in 1955 when he summited - at that point of time, it was the highest that an Indian had climbed.

Jayal was the founder principal of the Himalayan Mountaineering Institute at Darjeeling, with Tenzing Norgay of Everest fame as the Chief Instructor. Both of them were invited by the Swiss Government to Switzerland where they spent three months seeing new things and having new experiences. Maj Jayal became the only non-Swiss to win the coveted Swiss Guide's Diploma and Badge. Jayal led the 1955 Kamet expedition as the Director HMI. Jayal organised an expedition to Nanda Devi in 1957. Bad weather thwarted the expedition but Jayal, never one to give up, went next to the Karakoram where he conquered Saken (24,130 ft) and Sakang (24,150 ft), the third highest peak in the Karakoram range.

== Death ==
In 1958, the Government sponsored an expedition to Cho Oyu (26,864 ft), the sixth highest mountain in the world. Jayal died of pulmonary oedema caused by overexertion on this expedition at Camp I. He had started late and tried to catch up with the main party. There was also a problem in his medical care as much of the expedition equipment had been lost in a Dakota crash en route to Nepal. His death and that of some others brought home the cruel lesson of need for acclimatisation and discipline in the pursuit of Himalayan mountaineering.

=== Tributes ===
Pandit Jawaharlal Nehru, the Prime Minister of India, paid rich tributes to Jayal saying "the Major has set an example of courage and adventure which should inspire our young people. The news of his death came to me as a shock and I feel that the country has suffered the loss of her finest mountaineer..."

Arthur Foot, Jayal's Headmaster of Doon, noted that "The Himalaya completed his education into a stature of nobility", echoing a sentiment expressed two years earlier by Jayal himself who had noted, after an expedition to Saser Kangri, that "Pushing the body to the utmost for something indefinably inherent in a person, is intrinsically noble and worthwhile." R.L. Holdsworth, a teacher at Doon who had encouraged Jayal to pursue mountaineering noted after his death that "He died very much the master of himself and of most of the world that is worth mastering."

=== Commemoration ===
- The Indian Mountaineering Foundation had a Nandu Jayal Fund and published, along with the Corps of Engineers, a book Nandu Jayal and Indian Mountaineering, which contained articles on various aspects of Indian Mountaineering by him and by others.
- Nandu Jayal's life and career motivated many young officers of the Corps to take up mountaineering, most prominent of whom were his nephews, Harsh Vardhan Bahuguna and Jai Vardhan Bahuguna In Hope of Glory-The Brothers Who Died on Everest; both were officers of the Indian Army, dedicated mountaineers and both died on Mount Everest.
- In 1962, Vidya Dhar Jayal donated a silver cup to the Bengal Engineer Group and Centre to commemorate his brother.

== See also ==
- Role of The Doon School in Indian mountaineering

== Bibliography ==
- Corps of Engineers Archives. Lest We Forget, Weekly of the College of Military Engineering, Pune, Maharashtra, India, Issue of 25 October 2008.
- Sarin, H.C.. Indian Mountaineering Foundation and Indian Mountaineering. Himalayan Mountaineering Journal, Dec 1968, Vol 4, No 2, pg 15.
- Nathan, S.K. and Arora, Sudhir K. Bengal Sappers - Trail Blazers of the Indian Army Published by Bengal Engineer Group & Centre, Roorkee.
- A. E. Foot Alpine Journal Vol. 63. No. 297, 1958, Pages 231–232, Alpine Journal - Contents 1958
