= Jaonli =

Garhwal Himalaya peak

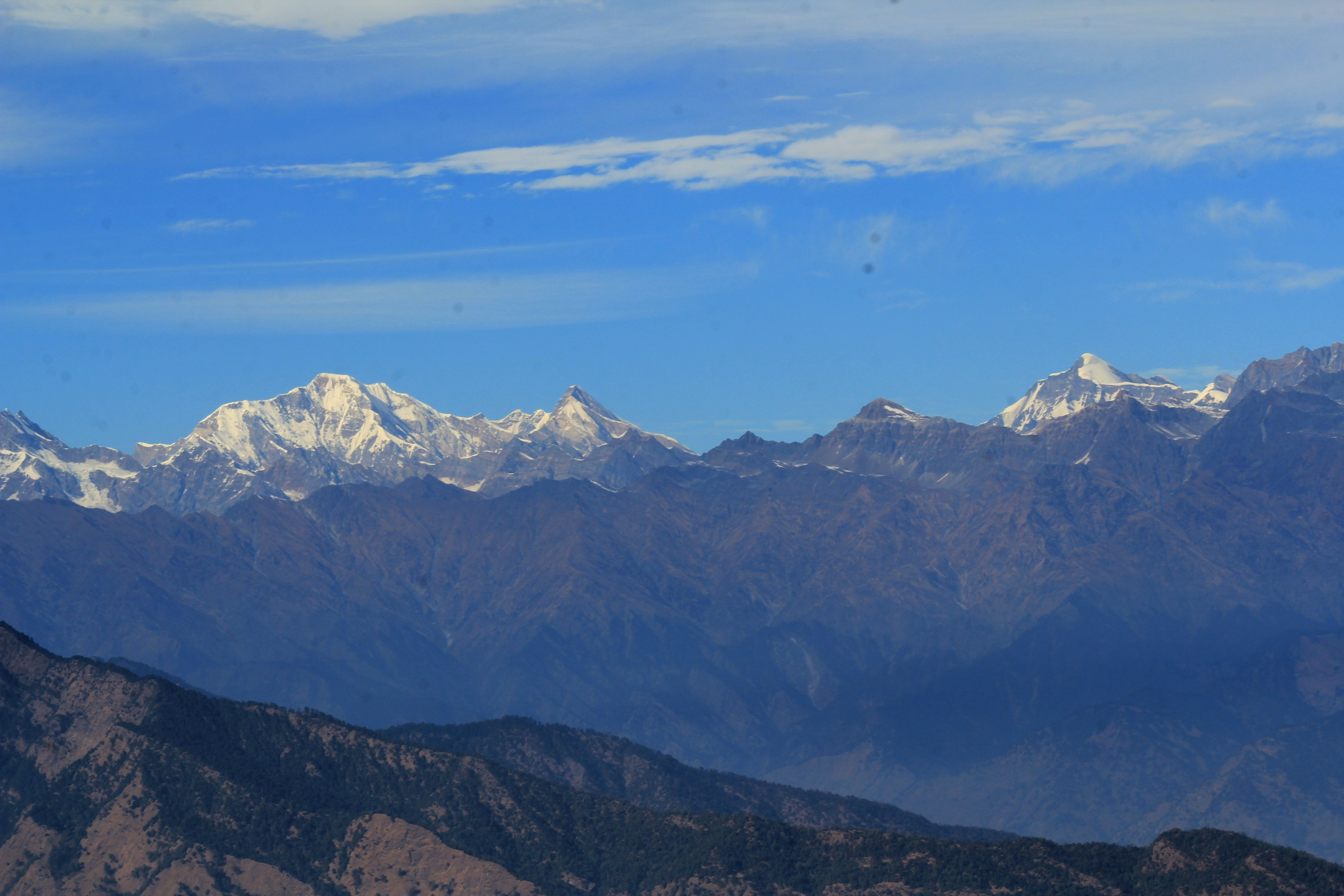
- Jaonli is the left-most snow-covered peak

Highest point
- Elevation: 6,632 m (21,759 ft)
- Listing: List of mountain peaks of Uttarakhand
- Coordinates: 30°51′33″N 78°51′37″E

Geography
- Location within Uttarakhand Location within India
- Parent range: Garhwal Himalaya

Climbing
- First ascent: 6 June 1965; Hari Dang and students of The Doon School

Jaonli is a 6,632-metre peak in the Gangotri range of Garhwal Himalaya. It was first climbed in 1965 by The Doon School expedition team led by Hari Dang.

== See also ==
- Role of The Doon School in Indian mountaineering
