= Jack Gibson (schoolmaster) =

Jack Gibson OBE
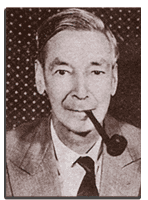
- Born: 3 March 1908; East Preston, West Sussex, England
- Died: 23 October 1994 (aged 86); India
- Education: St. John's College, University of Cambridge
- Occupations: Scholar, academic, Schoolmaster, Mountaineer
- Known for: Schoolmaster at The Doon School; Headmaster of Mayo College

John Travers Mends Gibson OBE (3 March 1908 – 23 October 1994) was an English schoolmaster, scholar, academic and a distinguished British Himalayan mountaineer.

== Early life and career ==
Gibson was the son of naval officer Charles Gibson and Emmeline Mary Fletcher and was born on 3 March 1908. He studied at Mowden Preparatory School in Brighton before he was sent in 1921 to Haileybury and Imperial Service College for schooling and later joined the University of Cambridge. At Cambridge, he earned a half blue in fencing. He almost made it to the British Olympic Team. In 1929, he began his career as a professor in Chillon College, Switzerland, responsible for teaching pupils History and winter sports. While at the college, he became a member of the famed Swiss Alpine Club. When the college suffered due to economic downturn, Gibson went on to teach at Ripon Grammar School. He remained at Ripon from 1932 until 1936, until 1935 under the headship of James Dyson, whom he admired. It was at Ripon that he met Malcolm Hailey, 1st Baron Hailey, who encouraged him to apply to The Doon School in India which had newly opened for Indian boys.

He applied to Doon and was offered the post of a housemaster. He joined Doon in January 1937 as the housemaster of Kashmir House. Apart from being a housemaster, he also taught Geography to Doon pupils. He took a brief leave while at Doon to fight in the Second World War for the Royal Indian Naval Reserve. Thereafter, he also served as Principal of the Joint Services Wing, which is now the National Defence Academy. As Principal, he gave a concrete shape to the academic and extra-curricular activities there and was fondly remembered by all, more so by the cadets undergoing training. Three of the first NDA Course cadets (Gen SF Rodrigues, Admiral L Ramdas and Air Chief Marshal NC Suri) who happened to become Chiefs of the three Services respectively around the same time, together paid a courtesy visit to him in Ajmer where he had settled. He stayed in Doon till 1953, before he was appointed as Principal of Mayo College, Rajasthan. He is widely credited to have brought Mayo College to national prominence. He remained in Mayo for 15 years till 1969. After retiring, he wrote extensively for the Alpine Journal and the Himalayan Club Journal.

== Mountaineering career highlights ==
- 1937 – Gibson along with his Doon School colleague John Martyn reached the Bandarpunch summit ridge for the first time, with Tenzing Norgay, who later became the first man to climb Mount Everest. In Tenzing's autobiography, he mentions Gibson several times as "my old friend Mr. Gibson".
- 1946 – Gibson was a member of the mountaineering enthusiasts at Doon along with Gurdial Singh, J.A.K. Martyn and R.L. Holdsworth. He was a member of many successful expeditions, including to Kamet and Trisul.
- 1970-1973- Gibson served as President of the Indian mountaineering club called the Himalayan Club. He was also a member of the Alpine Club.

== Honours and distinctions ==
Gibson was appointed an Officer of the Order of the British Empire by Queen Elizabeth II in 1960, and in 1965 received Padma Shri, the fourth-highest civilian award in India, from the Government of India for his contributions towards education. It was a rare achievement to have been honoured by both the governments.

== See also ==
- Role of The Doon School in Indian mountaineering
