= Harold Williams (British Army officer) =

Lieutenant-General Sir Harold Williams KBE CB
- Born: 1 June 1897; County Cork, Ireland
- Died: 17 October 1971 (aged 74) Mussoorie, India
- Allegiance: United Kingdom (1917–1956); India (1948–1956)
- Branch: British Army
- Service years: 1917–1956
- Rank: Lieutenant-General (Indian Army); Major-General (United Kingdom)
- Commands: Engineer-in-Chief, Indian Army
- Conflicts: Second World War
- Awards: Knight Commander of the Order of the British Empire, Companion of the Order of the Bath, Mentioned in Dispatches

Lieutenant-General Sir Harold Williams KBE CB (1 June 1897 – 17 October 1971) was an Irish-born British Army officer, engineer and mountaineer.

== Early life ==
Williams was born in County Cork and pursued his education at Mountjoy School, followed by tertiary studies at Trinity College, Dublin

== Military career ==
He attended the Royal Military Academy, Woolwich and commissioned into the Royal Engineers on 28 September 1917. He was posted to India, where he joined the 51st (Field) Company, Bengal Sappers and Miners. He served with the unit as part of the Aden Field Force, after which he spent three years in Roorkee, first as Company Officer and finally as Assistant Adjutant and Quartermaster, Bengal Sappers and Miners. He then took a supplementary engineering course at Cambridge University before returning to India in 1927. In 1933, he became an instructor at the Rashtriya Indian Military College and three years later, he became a Senior Instructor at Thomason Civil Engineering College (later the Indian Institute of Technology Roorkee), where he continued until 1938.

Shortly after the outbreak of the Second World War, Williams was appointed Commander Royal Engineer, 1st Armoured Division and served in the Battle of France. He evaded capture and was evacuated from Le Havre in 1940. From 1941 to 1942, he was a staff officer. From 1943 to 1944, he was Chief Engineer, IV Corps, serving in Assam and the Burma Campaign during which he was mentioned in dispatches. In 1945, he was appointed Commandant at the School of Military Engineering, Roorkee. He was invested as a Commander of the Order of the British Empire in 1946, and on 15 December 1948, he was promoted to the rank of brigadier.

=== Indian Army ===
Following the Partition of India, Williams was retained by the Indian Army as Engineer-in-Chief to aid in the establishment of India's independent armed forces. During this period, he led an Indian Engineer Himalayan expedition up Mount Kamet in June 1952. Williams was made a Companion of the Order of the Bath in 1953. He retired from the role in 1956 with the rank of lieutenant-general in the Indian Army and major-general in the British Army, and was made a KBE. From 1951 to 1958, he was Colonel Commandant, Indian Engineers.

== Civil engineering work ==
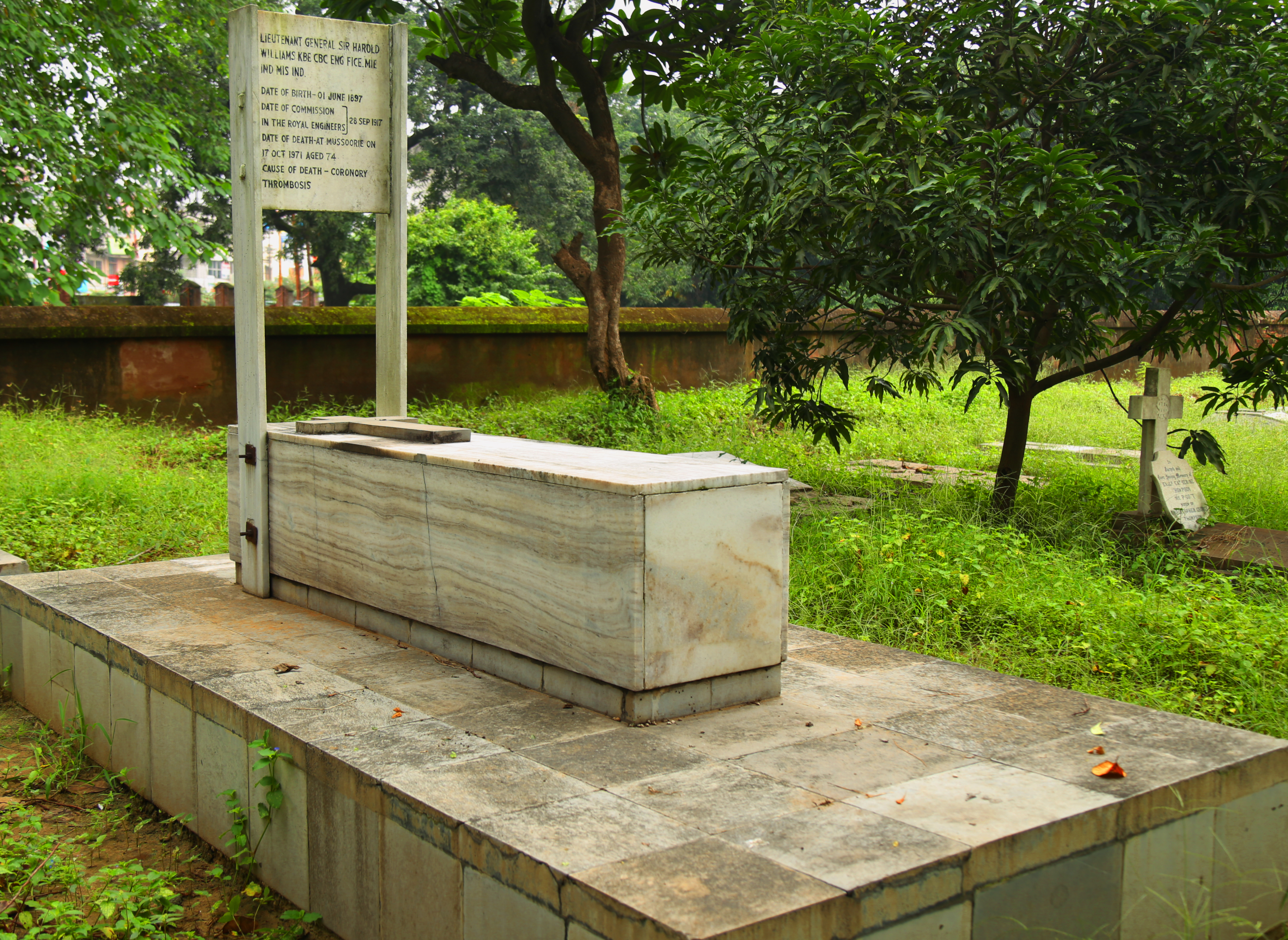
Grave in Roorkee

From 1962 to 1965, Williams was Engineering Adviser to the Council of Scientific and Industrial Research, India. Williams was President for a time of the Institution of Engineers (India), a founder member and President of the Indian Institute of Surveying & Mapping, and also President of the Institution of Military Engineers, India.

== Other work ==
Williams was a keen ornithologist and wrote a book on birdwatching in India. He was a founder-member of the Federation for the Welfare of Mentally Retarded Children in India. Williams joined the Alpine Club in 1953 and participated in several minor Himalayan expeditions, including Trisul and Bandarpunch. He was President of the Himalayan Club from 1960 to 1963. He also became the charter president of the Rotary club Roorkee in 1959.
