= IISM =

IISM may refer to:

- Indian Institute of Surveying & Mapping, an institute of survey education in Hyderabad, India
- Indian Institute of Skiing and Mountaineering, an institute chartered to train skiers and mountaineers in Gulmarg, India
