= Hari Dang =

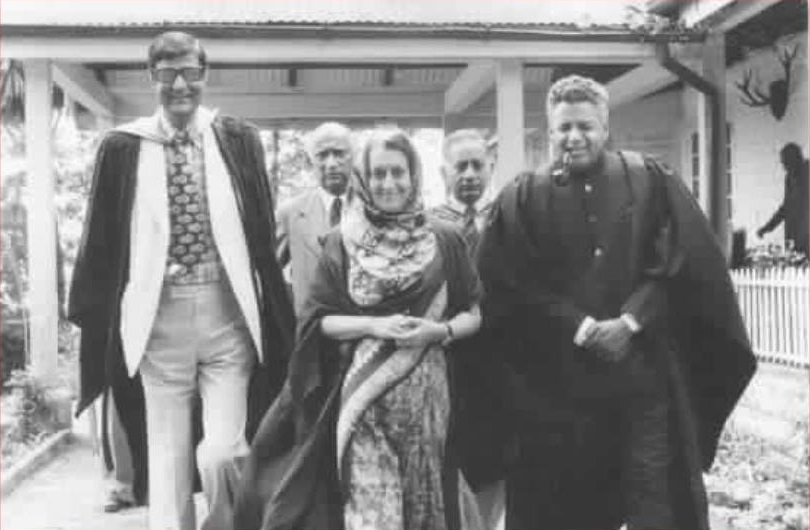
- Hari Dang (right) with Indira Gandhi at St. Paul's School, Darjeeling in 1978
- Died: 23 July 2016 (aged 81)
- Education: Modern School, Delhi; St. Stephen's College, Delhi
- Occupations: Educationist, mountaineer
- Known for: Rector at St. Paul's School, Darjeeling master at The Doon School; Principal, The Air Force School; Principal, Army Public School, Dhaula Kuan
- Awards: Padma Shri

Hari Dang (1935-2016) was an Indian educationist and a mountaineer. While at The Doon School, he led the schoolboys on the first Indian expedition to Mt. Jaonli (6,632 m) in 1965.

== Education ==
Dang was schooled at Modern School, Delhi, and then went to St. Stephen's College, Delhi where he received a bachelor's degree in chemistry. He graduated in 1955.

== Career ==
Dang worked as a journalist with The Statesman in Kolkata before joining The Doon School in 1959 as a chemistry teacher. At Doon, he led the boys on many mountaineering expeditions, including the first ascent of Jaonli peak. He left Doon in 1970 to become the principal of The Air Force School in New Delhi. He remained there for seven years and then took up the post of Rector at St. Paul's School, Darjeeling in 1977. He left St. Paul's in 1984 to head the Army Public School, Dhaula Kuan in New Delhi, where he remained till 1990. After retiring as principal in 1990, Dang served on various education boards and worked towards establishing model primary schools in rural, tribal and tribal areas of India.

== Mountaineering expeditions ==
While at Doon School, Dang led the schoolboys on many mountaineering expeditions. Having failed thrice, Dang led the first successful expedition to Jaonli (6,632m) with the schoolboys. In 1962, Dang was a member of the first non-Sherpa Indian expedition to Mount Everest, which was led by John Dias. Due to a snow blizzard, the party had to turn back 150 metres from the summit.

== Awards ==
Dang was awarded the Padma Shri in 1976 for his services in education.

== See also ==
- Role of The Doon School in Indian mountaineering
