= John Martyn (schoolmaster) =

English schoolmaster, scholar, academic and Himalayan mountaineer

John Martyn OBE
- Martyn during his retirement years
- Born: John A. K. Martyn; 1903; England
- Died: 1984 (aged 80–81); India
- Education: St John's College, Cambridge (BA)
- Occupations: Scholar, academic, schoolmaster
- Known for: Schoolmaster at Harrow School; Headmaster of The Doon School

John A. K. Martyn OBE (more commonly known as J. A. K. Martyn) (1903–1984), was an English schoolmaster, scholar, academic and a distinguished British Himalayan mountaineer. He was the second headmaster of The Doon School.

== Career ==
In 1935, John Martyn accompanied Arthur Foot to India to establish the teaching staff of The Doon School, a newly opened boarding school for Indian boys.

Martyn had previously taught at Harrow School in England for ten years before he moved to India. In Doon, he was given the post of Deputy Headmaster, which he kept till 1948. Shortly after Indian independence in 1947, Foot left Dehradun to take up the headship of Ottershaw School, and Martyn succeeded him to become the second headmaster of the Doon School. Martyn was at Doon for 31 years, thus becoming one of the longest-serving schoolmasters in the school's history. Of those 31 years, 18 were spent as Headmaster, making him the school's longest-serving Headmaster to date.

Apart from teaching, Martyn was very keen on mountaineering, and was part of the expedition team to Trisul with pioneers like Jack Gibson, Gurdial Singh and Nandu Jayal. He, along with Jack Gibson, climbed Bandarpunch with Tenzing Norgay, who later became the first man to climb Mount Everest.

== Honours and distinctions ==
Martyn was appointed an Officer of the Order of the British Empire by Queen Elizabeth II in 1958, and in 1983 Padma Shri, the fourth-highest civilian award in India, from the Government of India for his notable contributions to the establishment of the Doon School. He was one of the few Englishmen to have been honoured by both the governments. He was also a member of the famed Alpine Club.

After his death in 1984, his wife Mady Martyn wrote a book about him entitled Martyn Sahib, the story of John Martyn of the Doon School. In his honour, his wife and Martyn's friends set up John Martyn Memorial Trust in a village at the foothills of Himalayas called Salangaon. The trust runs a school for underprivileged children and provides free education to over 150 children.

Martyn House, a holding-house for new students at Doon, was named after him.

== See also ==
- Role of The Doon School in Indian mountaineering

Academic offices
| Preceded by Arthur Foot | Headmaster of The Doon School; 1948–1966 | Succeeded by C. J. Miller |
