= Gulab Ramchandani =

Gulab Ramchandani (24 December 1927 - 13 April 2017) was an Indian educator. He served as the headmaster of The Doon School from 1979 till 1988. He is credited with bringing about several notable educational reforms in the Indian education system.

== Early life and education ==
Ramchandani was born in Hyderabad, Sindh in Pakistan. His father was an army surgeon. In 1937, he went to study at The Doon School and then to Lucknow University where he earned a bachelor's degree in botany.

== Career ==
He started his career as a trainee at Blue Star and remained there for 33 years. He became the company's executive director. In 1979, he joined Doon as headmaster, becoming the first alumnus to be appointed in the post. Initially, he faced resistance from the staff due to his corporate background. Later, his restructuring of school administration and finances brought the school financial stability.

He was a member of the Board of Governors of Orchid Educational Organisation. He was also on the governing bodies of Welham Boys School, Sanskar International School, Assam Valley School and SelaQui International School. After retiring from Doon in 1988, Ramchandani set up around 25 schools across India.

== Death ==
Ramchandani died on 13 April 2017, due to chronic obstructive pulmonary disease.

Academic offices
Preceded by Eric Simeon	Headmaster of The Doon School; 1979-1988	Succeeded by Shomie Das
