= Vidya Dhar Jayal =

Indian army officer

Brigadier Vidya Dhar Jayal DSO
- Born: 31 December 1910
- Died: 3 October 1988 (aged 77)
- Alma mater: Prince of Wales Royal Indian Military College, Dehradun; Royal Military College, Sandhurst
- Relatives: Narendra Dhar Jayal
- Military career
- Allegiance: British India; India
- Branch: British Indian Army; Indian Army
- Rank: Brigadier
- Unit: 13th Frontier Force Regiment
- Conflicts: World War II; East Africa campaign; Indo-Pakistani War of 1947
- Awards: Distinguished Service Order

Brigadier Vidya Dhar Jayal, DSO, (born 31 December 1910 – 10 March 1988) was an army officer who served in the British Indian Army and later the Indian Army.

== Early life ==
Vidya Dhar Jayal was born to Rai Bahadur Pandit Chakradhar Jayal, who after retiring from the Indian Police Service served as the Dewan of the Tehri Garhwal princely state. The Indian mountaineer Narendra Dhar Jayal was Vidya Dhar's brother.

Vidya Dhar did schooling from the Royal Indian Military College (RIMC), Dehradun (1923–29). He then attended the Royal Military College, Sandhurst (1930–31).

== Military Service ==
=== Early service ===
On 29 January 1932, Jayal appeared on the 'unattached list' for the British Indian Army in The London Gazatte.

On 12 January 1934, his promotion from 2nd Lieutenant to Lieutenant was announced in The London Gazette.

Jayal became the first Indian officer to be posted in the 6th Battalion of the 13th Frontier Force Regiment, earlier known as 59th Scinde Rifles. He came to be fluent in Pushtu and knowledgeable about Pathan culture and customs while serving in this unit.

He served alongside Anant Singh Pathania and Bakhtiar Rana in the Waziristan Campaign of 1936-39, among other young (then) Indian officers of the 6/13 FFR.

=== World War II ===
On 28 August 1939, Jayal became a captain, was made an acting major from 12 October 1940 till 11 January 1941, and a temporary major from 12 January 1941 till 24 August 1941.

In the rank of major, Jayal was awarded the Distinguished Service Order (DSO) for displaying 'conspicuous bravery and military skill' against the Italians at the Barentu Road in Eritrea in January 1941, in the East African Campaign. He received his decoration from King George VI at the Buckingham Palace in 1946.

Later in the same year, he left Eritrea for Quetta to attend a course at the Staff College there.

=== Post-Independence ===
In the rank of brigadier, Jayal commanded the 80 Infantry Brigade of the Indian Army during the Indo-Pakistan War of 1947-48.

In 1949, he held a Sub-Area Command at Allahabad.

In the early 1950s, he served as the Commander of 201 Brigade Area in North East India.

After retiring with the rank of brigadier, over the late 1950s-early 1960s, Jayal served as Director of Military Training and Social Service in the Government of Uttar Pradesh state, India.

== Others ==
- Jayal was a noted collector of Garhwal paintings and had inherited his father's collection of the same.
- He was an 'Ordinary Member' of the Indian History Congress.
- In 1950, he was present in an official capacity at an ex-servicemen's reunion of the Sikkim State Sailor's Soldier's and Airmen's Board, as the Commander of 201 Brigade Area.
- A letter dated 7 April 1953, from Jayal to Devika Rani, an early Bollywood actress and member of the renowned Roerich family, providing her with an idea for a movie based on World War II, is available on the website of the Roerich Museum.
- In 1962, he donated a silver cup to the Bengal Engineer Group and Centre to commemorate his brother Narendra Dhar Jayal, who had served in this unit and had died in a mountaineering expedition to Cho Oyu in 1958.
- In 1970, Jayal emphasized that India should have one language, at a seminar on Defence Terminology organised by the Commission for Scientific and Technical Terminology, GoI.
- Brig Jayal presented a ceremonial bell to his alma mater, the RIMC Dehradun.
- A story of a dinner Jayal hosted post-retirement for K.M. Cariappa (later Field Marshal of the Indian Army) appears in a biographical essay on Cariappa.
- After retirement, he lived at Chakrasan, village Thakrani, district Dehradun.
- In June 1981, he delivered a talk titled 'Garhwal ki sainik parampara' (the military tradition of Garhwal) on Akashvani radio, from the Najibabad station.

== Bibliography ==
- Jayal, Vidya Dhar. (1947). "Ready, Aye Ready!". Journal of the United Service Institution of India. Vol. 77.
- Jayal, Vidya Dhar. (1967). Diwan Chakra Dhar Jayal and the Traditions of His Family. Maxwell Press.
