= Eric Simeon =

Indian Army officer and schoolmaster (1918-2007)

Lt. Col. Eric Joseph Simeon
- Born: 1918; Allahabad, British India
- Died: 15 May 2007 (aged 88–89); India
- Education: B.A., M.A. University of Allahabad
- Occupations: Scholar, Academic, Schoolmaster
- Known for: Headmaster of La Martiniere Calcutta (1967-1970); Headmaster of The Doon School (1971-1979); Headmaster of Cathedral and John Connon School (1979-1986)

Eric Joseph Simeon (1918–2007), was an Indian school educationalist. He was the headmaster of some of the distinguished schools of India from 1960s to the mid-1980s. He served as the headmaster of La Martiniere Calcutta, The Doon School and Cathedral and John Connon School.

== Career ==
In 1949, then Capt. Eric Simeon — a Corps of Signals officer — was posted at the Prince of Wales Royal Indian Military College, Dehradun.

Later, in July 1961 when stationed in Delhi — he was summoned by V. K. Krishna Menon, then Defence Minister of India, to head the first Sainik School of India. It was the beginning of his educational career when he became the Founder Principal of Sainik School, Kunjpura. He served there for seven years till his retirement from the Indian Army in 1967.

From 1967 till 1970, he was the headmaster of La Martiniere School for Boys, Calcutta. After his tenure at La Martiniere he joined The Doon School as its fourth headmaster. He was the first Indian headmaster at the Doon School and became one of the longest serving headmasters in Doon's history with a tenure spanning almost a decade. After his retirement from Doon, his last project was the headmastership of Cathedral and John Connon School in Mumbai.

On 15 May 2007 he died of lung cancer.

== See also ==
- Prince of Wales Royal Indian Military College
- The Doon School
- Headmasters of The Doon School

Academic offices
Preceded by C. J. Miller	Headmaster of The Doon School; 1971-1979	Succeeded by Gulab Ramchandani
