= Christopher J. Miller =

English schoolmaster in India

C. J. Miller
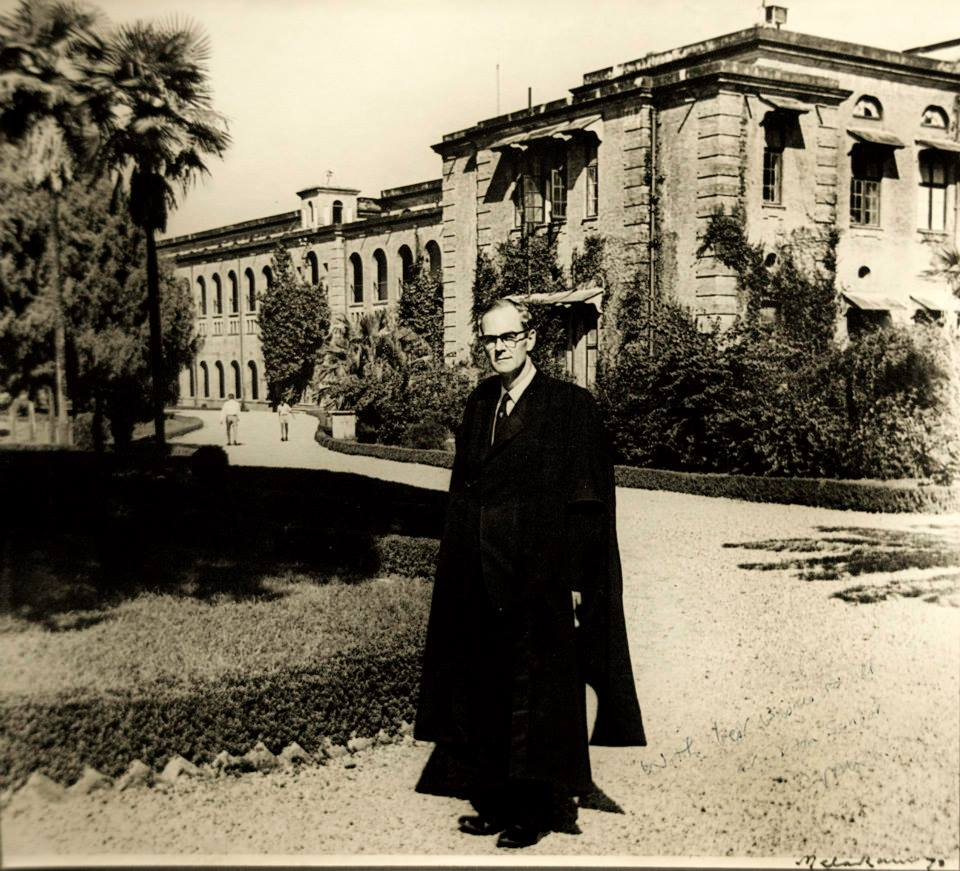
- Born: 1916; England
- Died: India
- Occupations: Scholar, Academic, Schoolmaster
- Known for: Headmaster of The Doon School

Christopher J. Miller was an English academic, professor and scholar. He served as the third English headmaster of The Doon School, India from 1966 till 1970 and the last English one before the appointment of Matthew Raggett in 2016. He had an MA from University of Cambridge. During his tenure at Doon, his protégés included: Vikram Seth, Karan Thapar, Amitav Ghosh, Ramchandra Guha.

Academic offices
Preceded by J.A.K. Martyn	Headmaster of The Doon School; 1966-1970	Succeeded by Eric Simeon
