= Ottershaw School =

Former boys school in Ottershaw

Coordinates: 51.3571°N 0.5468°W

Ottershaw School was founded in 1948 as an English school for boys in Ottershaw Park, Ottershaw, approximately 30 miles (48 km) southwest of London between Chertsey and Woking, Surrey, south of England, on an estate that dated back to 1761, when the first house was built there.

== History ==
It was the first local authority boarding school to be set up, following the recommendations of the 1943 Fleming Report, which were implemented in the Butler Education Act, of the following year. The David Fleming, Lord Fleming parliamentary committee, explored ways in which the benefits of a public school education could be made more widely available to those young people whose financial means and backgrounds made it difficult for them to enter what was an exclusive and expensive system. Ottershaw had no entrance examination or financial barrier for students to be accepted as boarders. School fees were subject to a means test, the poorest students receiving a bursary from the county council if their parents applied for one.

The criterion for entry was a boy's "boarding school need", in other words, those students most likely to benefit from a residential education away from their home. Thus, many students came from families broken up by the Second World War, other such dire circumstances, or from environments that were not conducive to academic or personal development. There was, too, a proportion of entrants who wished to attend a boarding school but whose parents could not afford the fees at a traditional public school (United Kingdom). Entry was not totally restricted to children of Surrey residents.

Ottershaw was established by Surrey County Council (SCC) in 1948, as a boarding school for boys aged 12 to 18. It was the first of its kind in the country to be entirely in the hands of a Local Education Authority.

SCC had purchased the estate in 1945, after the war, during which time much of it had been used by the Ministry of Defence, as a vehicle park, and, for a while, the giant US Mobil petroleum company had its UK headquarters in the imposing mansion building, with its magnificent formal gardens. Prior to the war, Ottershaw had also been a boarding school for boys, when it was known as Ottershaw College.

The first boys and school masters arrived in 1948 and were led by headmaster Arthur Foot, who had been the first headmaster of The Doon School in India. Foot was appointed a CBE in the same year that he arrived at Ottershaw.

Ottershaw sat in 148 acres (0.60 km^{2}) of landscaped grounds that contained classrooms, laboratories, workshops, playing fields and the mansion itself.

Arthur Foot based Ottershaw on Winchester College, his old public school. For instance, he introduced small desks called "toyes", with a backboard and cupboard, which each student had as their own property each term. Just like at Winchester College, every evening, students would sit at their toyes to study, in a large room, watched over by a prefect.

Ottershaw was an unusual school because of the "character building" as well as academic achievement ethos on which it was founded, similar to Gordonstoun public school. But Ottershaw's curriculum, teaching methods, and school routine, were otherwise conventional. It had two streams; one with an academic, the other with a technical emphasis. Ottershaw had an organised games programme, with its soccer, rugby and cricket teams playing public school sides, including Eton, a wide choice of clubs and societies and an Air Training Corps, later the Combined Cadet Corps, with an Army section linked to the Queens Regiment. In addition, Ottershaw offered all activities available in public and grammar schools, including camps built by its student in woodlands in the school's grounds, during their spare time.

== Expansion ==
The growing number of boarders at Ottershaw School meant the Mansion could not cope and in the 1950s this led to the building of what is now Tulk House. This was built in two stages, the first block, West House, being completed in 1952 to accommodate about 60 boys, followed in 1961 by a connecting block, Tulk House (named after the first Chairman of the Governors, Mr J A Tulk).

The school was divided into four Houses (North, East, West & Tulk) of approximately 60 boys each. The four Housemasters looked after the boys' welfare and in addition each boy was also allotted a Tutor whose duty it was to look after the boys' academic work.

Mostly, the school was only open to boys resident in Surrey. But boys who were sons of a member of the British Armed Forces, or, whose parents were normally resident abroad, could also attend.

== Extra-curricular activities ==
In addition to normal academic work and sport, boys also had to perform daily duties around the school via Duty Squads. These included Servers (who laid tables and brought in food at meals), Clearers (who cleared tables after meals) and Sweepers (who swept floors, changing areas and stairs). Outdoor squads took care of pitches and playing fields, gardening and paths. Others took care of workshops and other school buildings or collected laundry, rang school bells, delivered post or took care of sports equipment.

Community responsibility was taken much further than duties within the school. Pupils undertook an extensive range of projects within the local community and further afield. They renovated classrooms for local Primary Schools, erected bus shelters, built accommodation for the Cheshire Foundation, helped on the newly formed Ockenden Venture and constructed a Youth Club building in Camberwell. Within the school itself, pupils built the cricket pavilion, the Staff Room and the Sixth Form Centre all under the supervision of the school's technical staff.

== Headmasters ==
In 1964, Arthur Foot retired and Allan Dodds was appointed as the new headmaster. Dodds was a Cambridge graduate, previously a housemaster at St Peter's York, a justice of the peace, Samaritan and founder of the Boarding Schools Association. He successfully saw the school, of just 250 students, through a rapidly changing educational climate. But, at that size, which gave it a lower student to teacher ratio than the most exclusive public schools, the Conservative Party (UK) politicians who ran Surrey county council, did not think it represented value for money. After Ottershaw School closed, Dodds first became a Ministry of Defence (United Kingdom) civil servant, before being appointed personal assistant to the Bishop of Southwark, Ronald Bowlby. Dodds died in March 2016. His son Richard Dodds , who grew up at the school, is a former English field hockey player and was captain of the gold medal-winning Great Britain squad in the 1988 Summer Seoul Olympics. He is currently a consultant orthopaedic surgeon in Berkshire, UK.

== Closure ==
Financial considerations were always a concern for the cost-cutting Surrey County Council chiefs, despite the economies achieved by the school's frugal organisation. A substantial increase in student numbers might have made Ottershaw more cost effective, and various measures were proposed by campaigners to achieve this. However, despite vigorous political lobbying taken to the House of Commons by students, staff, parents and friends of Ottershaw, the county council decided to close the school in 1980.

Since 1981, the site has been redeveloped as an upmarket residential estate. There is an active Old Boys Society.

== Notable alumni ==
- Mike Campbell-Lamerton
- John Challis
- Patrick Fairweather
- Anthony May
- Tiff Needell
- John Romer (Egyptologist)
- Charlie Whelan
- Marc Wadsworth, journalist & political activist.

== See also ==
- Christ Church, Ottershaw
- Ottershaw

== Sources ==
- Williams, Dennis, ed. (November 2008). Run like a Stag:The Story of Ottershaw School 1948 – 1980. Peacock Press. ISBN 978-1-904846-31-4.
