= Constructing Post-Colonial India =

Book by Sanjay Srivastava

Constructing Post-Colonial India: National Character and the Doon School
- Author: Sanjay Srivastava
- Language: English
- Subject: Sociology
- Publisher: Routledge
- Publication date: 1998
- Publication place: India
- Media type: Print (Hardback and paperback)
- Pages: 272
- ISBN: 9780415178556

Constructing Post-Colonial India: National Character and the Doon School is a 1998 book by Indian sociologist Sanjay Srivastava that surveys post-colonial Indian identity with a focus on The Doon School, an elite all-boys boarding school founded in 1935 in Dehradun, India. From 1989 through 1993, Srivastava conducted field research at the school, and he interviewed parents and teachers as well as the school's graduates. The book's main argument is that to be post-colonial in India necessitates the espousal of values such as secularism, rationalism, and a modernity that is not Occidental-inspired, but is contextual to the country.

== See also ==
- Colonial India
- Postcolonialism
