= Bandarpunch =

Mountain in Uttarakhand, India

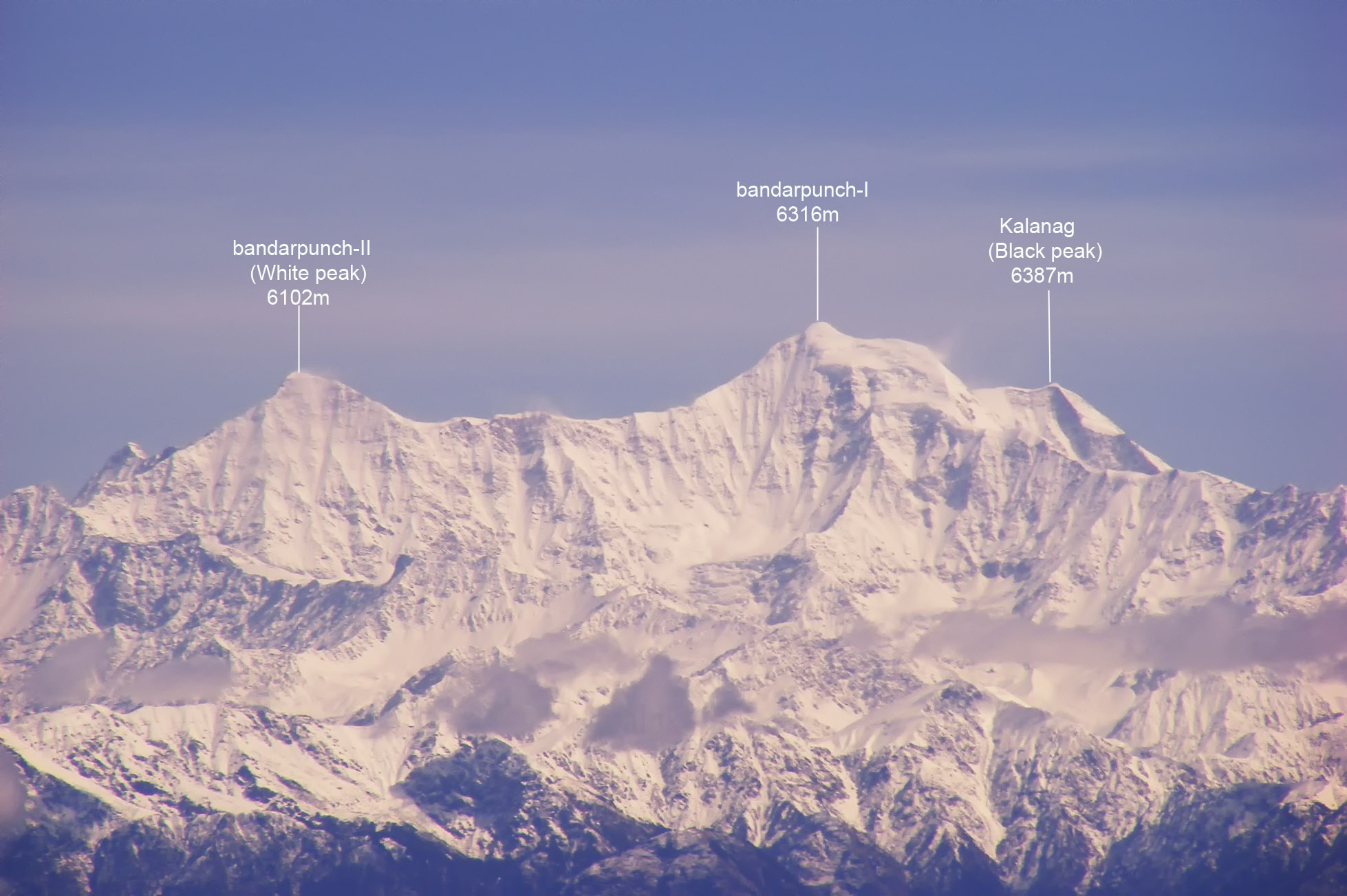

Highest point
- Elevation: 6,316 m (20,722 ft)
- Listing: Mountains of India
- Coordinates: 31°00′28″N 78°55′33″E

Geography
- Location within Uttarakhand Location within India
- Location: Uttarakhand, India
- Parent range: Garhwal Himalayas

Bandarpunch (lit. Hindi: Monkey's tail) is a mountain massif in the Garhwal Himalaya in Uttarakhand, India. The massif has 3 peaks: White Peak (6102 m), also called Banderpunch II, to the west above Yamunotri; almost 5 km east is Bandarpunch main peak or Banderpunch I (6316 m); and about 4 km to the north-east is Kalanag (6387 m).

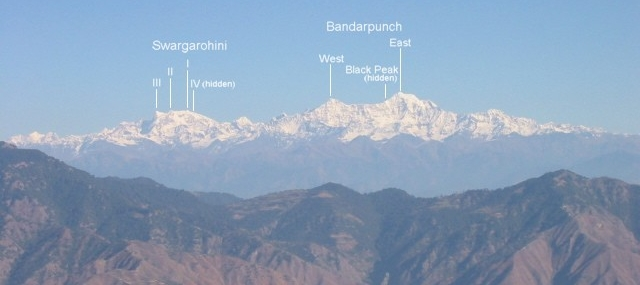
Swargarohini and Bandarpunch peaks in the Himalaya, viewed from Landour.

== Mythology ==
The name is inspired by the mythological tale in which Hanuman, the monkey god, extinguishes his tail, after it catches fire during the battle between King Rama and Ravana in Lanka, by going to the summit of the mountain.

== Climbing history ==
In 1937, a team of Doon School masters who were keen alpinists, J.T.M Gibson and John Martyn along with legendary mountaineer sherpa Tenzing Norgay reached the summit ridge for the first time. In 1946, another Doon expedition made a summit attempt, this time including, in addition to the original members, schoolmaster R. L. Holdsworth and a pupil, Nandu Jayal, Major Chengappa Nanda and John Munro (Norgay would later label Bandarpunch "The Doon School mountain" owing to the affinity shared by the schoolmasters and pupils for the mountain, which was the most prominent Himalayan peak visible from Mussoorie). The attempt was made from the south, after crossing the Darwa Pass, but was unsuccessful due to poor weather.

Major General Harold Williams led the first successful climbing expedition in 1950. The first team to summit Bandarpunch Peak comprised Tenzing Norgay, Sergeant Roy Greenwood and Sherpa Kin Chok Tshering.

== Geography ==
Bandarpunch is located at the western edge of the high Himalayan range where it turns the corner to the northwest. It is part of the Sankari Range and lies within the Govind Pashu Vihar National Park and Sanctuary. It is a major watershed for the headwaters of the Yamuna River, whose source lies above Yamunotri, on the west end of the massif below White Peak. Yamunotri is the westernmost of the four most sacred pilgrimage places (Chota Char Dham) and destination for thousands of pilgrims annually. On the north side of the Bandapunch massif, the 12 km long glacier from its flanks feeds the Ruinsar Gad which flows into the Yamuna at Seema. On the south side, the glacier at the base of Bandarpunch peak feeds the Hanuman Ganga River which joins the Yamuna at Hanuman Chatti.

== See also ==
- Sacred mountains of India
- Gangotri
- Yamunotri
- Sarasvati Udgam Sthal Adi Badri, Sarasvati River descends in plains
- List of mountain peaks of Uttarakhand
