= Bagpur =

- Village
- Country: India
- State: Punjab
- District: Jalandhar
- Tehsil: Nakodar

Government
  - Type: Panchayat raj
  - Body: Gram panchayat

Area
  - Total: 1.427 km^{2} (0.551 sq mi)

Population (2011)
  - Total: 259; 128/131 ♂/♀
  - Density: 181.4/km^{2} (470/sq mi)
  - Scheduled Castes: 129; 59/70 ♂/♀
  - Total Households: 55

Languages
  - Official: Punjabi
- Time zone: UTC+5:30 (IST)
- ISO 3166 code: IN-PB
- Website: jalandhar.gov.in

Bagpur is a village in Nakodar in Jalandhar district of Punjab State, India. It is located 9 kilometres (5.6 mi) from sub district headquarter and 31 kilometres (19 mi) from district headquarter. The village is administrated by Sarpanch an elected representative of the village.

== Demography ==
As of 2011, the village has a total number of 55 houses and a population of 259 of which 128 are males while 131 are females. According to the report published by Census India in 2011, out of the total population of the village 129 people are from Schedule Caste, but the village does not have any Schedule Tribe population.

== Education ==
Sanskar International School is located near the village.

== See also ==
- List of villages in India
