= Sanjay Srivastava =

Sociologist

Anthropologist and British Academy Global Professor Sanjay Srivastava
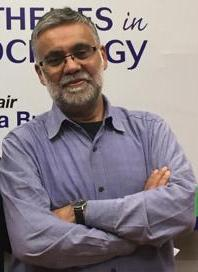
- Prof. Sanjay Srivastava in 2019
- Education: University of Sydney
- Known for: Constructing Post-Colonial India
- Scientific career
- Workplaces: Institute of Economic Growth, Delhi, Jawaharlal Nehru University, University College London, SOAS University of London

Professor Sanjay Srivastava is a sociologist. He is currently at the Department of Anthropology and Sociology, SOAS University of London. He is visiting fellow at many institutions, including the Institute of Economic Growth, Delhi, India.

== Education ==
Professor Srivastava completed Ph.D. in Social Anthropology from the University of Sydney in 1994.

== Bibliography ==
Some of his written works are:

- (co-editor) (2019) Critical Themes in Indian Sociology. Sage.
- (2015). Entangled Urbanism: Slum, Gated Community and Shopping Mall in Delhi and Gurgaon. Oxford University Press.
- (2013). Sexuality Studies. Oxford University Press.
- (2007) Passionate Modernity. Sexuality, Class and Consumption in India. Routledge.
- (contributing editor) (2004) Sexual Sites, Seminal Attitudes: Sexualities, Masculinities and Culture in South Asia. Sage.
- (Co-author) (2001) Asia. Cultural Politics in the Global Age. Palgrave.
- (1998) Constructing Post-Colonial India National Character and the Doon School. Routledge.
