= Arthur Foot =

English schoolmaster, educationalist and academic

Arthur E. Foot CBE
- Born: 21 June 1901; Burnley, Lancashire, England
- Died: 26 September 1968 (aged 67)
- Occupation: Schoolmaster
- Known for: Schoolmaster at Eton College; First headmaster of the Doon School & Ottershaw School

Arthur Edward Foot CBE (more commonly A.E. Foot) (21 June 1901 – 26 September 1968), was an English schoolmaster, educationalist and academic. He was a science master at Eton College from 1923 to 1932. In 1935, he was invited to India to head a newly opened all-boys boarding school, the Doon School, where he was the first headmaster from 1935 to 1948. He then returned to England as head of another new school, Ottershaw.

== Life ==
The son of William Henry Foot, by his marriage to Harriet Pearson, the young Foot was educated at Winchester College and at Trinity College, Cambridge. From 1923 to 1934 he was an assistant master at Eton, acting as secretary of the national Science Masters' Association from 1932 to 1934. He then went out to India to take up the position of first headmaster at the Doon School, Dehradun, where he remained until 1948. In India he was active as a radio broadcaster on educational topics between 1936 and 1945, was chairman of the Indian Public Schools Conference for 1943–44, and served on the Commander-in-Chief's Indian National War Academy Committee in 1945–46.

After leaving Doon, Foot returned to England and subsequently went on to become the first headmaster of Ottershaw School, retiring in 1964. He was president of the Surrey County Teachers' Association for 1955–1956.

In 1935, he had married Sylvia Hartill and they had one son and one daughter. He died on 26 September 1968, when his address in Who's Who was given as Pitter Cottage, Crawley, Winchester, Hampshire.

== Honours ==
- Boy Scouts Association Medal of Merit, 1934
- Kaisar-i-Hind Gold Medal, 1946
- Commander of the Order of the British Empire, 1948

Academic offices
Preceded by --	First Headmaster of The Doon School; 1935-1948	Succeeded by John Martyn
