= The Doon School =

Boys' boarding school in Dehradun, India

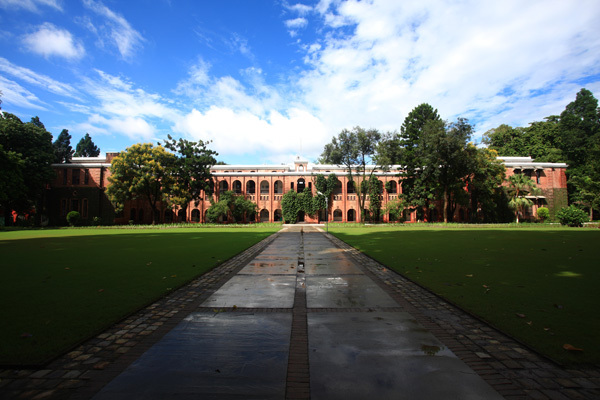
- Main Building of The Doon School

Location
- The Doon School; Mall Road; Dehradun – 248001; India (Google Map, OpenStreetMap); 30°20′00″N 78°01′48″E

Information
- School type: Private boarding school
- Motto: Knowledge Our Light
- Founded: September 10, 1935; 91 years ago
- Founder: Satish Ranjan Das (S.R Das)
- CEEB code: 671616
- Chairman of Governors: Anoop Bishnoi
- Headmaster: Jagpreet Singh
- Faculty: 70
- Grades: 7 to 12
- Gender: boys
- Age: 12 to 18
- Enrollment: c. 500
- Campus: 72 acres (290,000 m^{2})
- Houses: 6
- Student Union/Association: The Doon School Old Boys' Society
- Colours: Blue & White
- Publication: The Doon School Weekly
- Annual tuition: ₹1,362,000 (Home students) ₹1,702,500 (International)
- Affiliation: IB, CISCE, IGCSE
- Alumni: Doscos
- Website: doonschool.com

The Doon School (informally Doon School or Doon) is a selective all-boys private boarding school in Dehradun, Uttarakhand, India, which was established in 1935. It was envisioned by Satish Ranjan Das, a lawyer from Calcutta, as a school modelled on the British public school while remaining conscious of Indian ambitions and desires. The school admitted its first pupils on 10 September 1935, and formally opened on 27 October 1935, with Lord Willingdon presiding over the ceremony. The school's first headmaster was Arthur E. Foot, an English educationalist who had spent nine years as a science master at Eton College, England.

The school houses roughly 580 pupils aged 12 to 18, and admission is based on a competitive entrance examination and an interview with the headmaster. Every year boys are admitted in only two-year groups: seventh grade in January and eighth grade in April. As of May 2019, boys from 26 Indian states as well as 35 non-resident Indians and foreign nationals were studying at Doon. The school is fully residential, and boys and most teachers live on campus. In tenth grade, students take the Cambridge IGCSE examinations, and for the final two years can choose between the Indian School Certificate or International Baccalaureate. A broad range of extra-curricular activities, numbering around 80, are offered to the boys, and early masters such as R.L. Holdsworth, J.A.K. Martyn, Jack Gibson and Gurdial Singh established a strong tradition of mountaineering at school. The school occupies the former site of the Forest Research Institute and is home to diverse flora and fauna. Doon remains a boys-only school despite continued pressure from political leaders to become coeducational. Old boys of the school are known as 'Doscos'.

Doon has been consistently ranked as the best all-boys residential school in India. Although the school has often been cited as 'Eton of India' by media outlets such as the BBC, The New York Times, The Guardian, The Spectator, The Daily Telegraph, and Washington Post, it eschews the label. Doon often draws attention, and sometimes criticism, from the media for the perceived disproportionate influence of its alumni in spheres such as Indian politics, business, or culture. In the 1980s, Prime Minister Rajiv Gandhi's administration was criticised, and labelled "Doon Cabinet", following the appointment of his school acquaintances to major posts. The school has educated a wide range of notable alumni, including politicians, diplomats, artists, writers and businesspeople including late Indian Prime Minister Rajiv Gandhi and Olympic gold medalist Abhinav Bindra.

== History ==
=== Origins ===
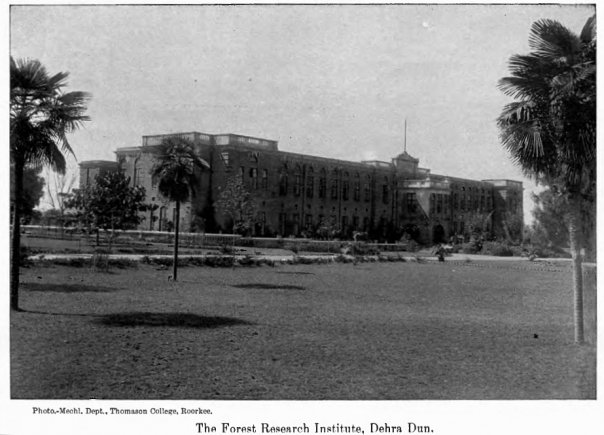
Main Building of Doon in 1917, when it was part of the Forest Research Institute.

Doon was the culmination of some considerable lobbying and efforts by Satish Ranjan Das, a lawyer from Calcutta and advocate-general of Bengal, who in 1927 became a member of the Viceroy's Executive Council of Lord Irwin. He envisioned a new kind of Indian public school that was modelled on traditional British public schools, but was "distinctively Indian in their moral and spiritual outlook and open to all castes and communities". While Jawaharlal Nehru welcomed the idea of such a school, there were many, like Mahatma Gandhi and Rabindranath Tagore, who were opposed to it, considering it inegalitarian. Das travelled widely in India with the goal of collecting ₹40 million, but at the time of his death in 1928 had raised only ₹1 million in cash and a further ₹1 million in promises. With the money, Das formed the Indian Public Schools' Society (IPSS), with the objective of founding new public schools in India that would admit students regardless of caste, creed or social status.

After Das's death in 1928, the IPSS accomplished little, and by 1934 some of the original lenders had begun to inquire about the return of their money. To solve this problem, Sir Joseph Bhore, then Railway Minister of Lord Willingdon's Council, became IPSS chairman, and along with Sir Frank Noyce and Sir Akbar Hydari as secretary, worked to obtain the former estate of the Forest Research Institute, in Dehradun, from the government on favourable terms. Lord Halifax, then President of the British Board of Education, led a selection committee that nominated Arthur E. Foot, a science teacher at Eton College, to be the first headmaster. The school admitted its first pupils on 10 September 1935, and on 27 October 1935, the Viceroy, Lord Willingdon, presided over the formal opening of the school. Seventy boys enrolled in the first term, and 110 more signed up for the second.

=== Early years: 1935–1970 ===
Foot had never visited India before accepting the position of headmaster. He noted that the school appeared to be surrounded by forests and close to mountains, and the possibilities of outdoor recreation and mountaineering seem to have influenced his decision as much as the chance to create a completely new type of school in India. Foot's first action upon being offered the position was to recruit J. A. K. (John) Martyn from Harrow School as his deputy. Although Martyn had not visited India before, he took up the offer because of the opportunity it afforded him to implement the ideas of German educator Kurt Hahn at Doon; it was something he had not been able to do at Harrow. Doon's ethos and guiding principles were determined early in its life by Foot, Martyn, R. L. Holdsworth and Jack Gibson, who went on to become principal of Mayo College, and Martyn acknowledged the influence of Hahn's ideas in the development of the school's ethos. They were soon joined in their efforts by Indians such as the artist Sudhir Khastgir (the school's first art teacher, who had trained previously in Santiniketan) and Gurdial Singh, a noted mountaineer who taught at Doon for several decades. In an essay entitled The Objects of Education published in the school magazine, Foot offered a template for a complete education for boys, which included teaching them to form a habit of choosing good over evil, think logically, express their thoughts and views clearly, and maintain a healthy body. At the opening of the school, he said, "Our boys should leave The Doon School as members of an aristocracy, but it must be an aristocracy of service inspired by the ideals of unselfishness, not one of privilege, wealth or position". The annual school fees in 1935 was ₹1,375, and by September 1946, had risen to ₹1,800. The per-capita income of India, then largely an agricultural society, in 1947 has been recorded as ₹252.

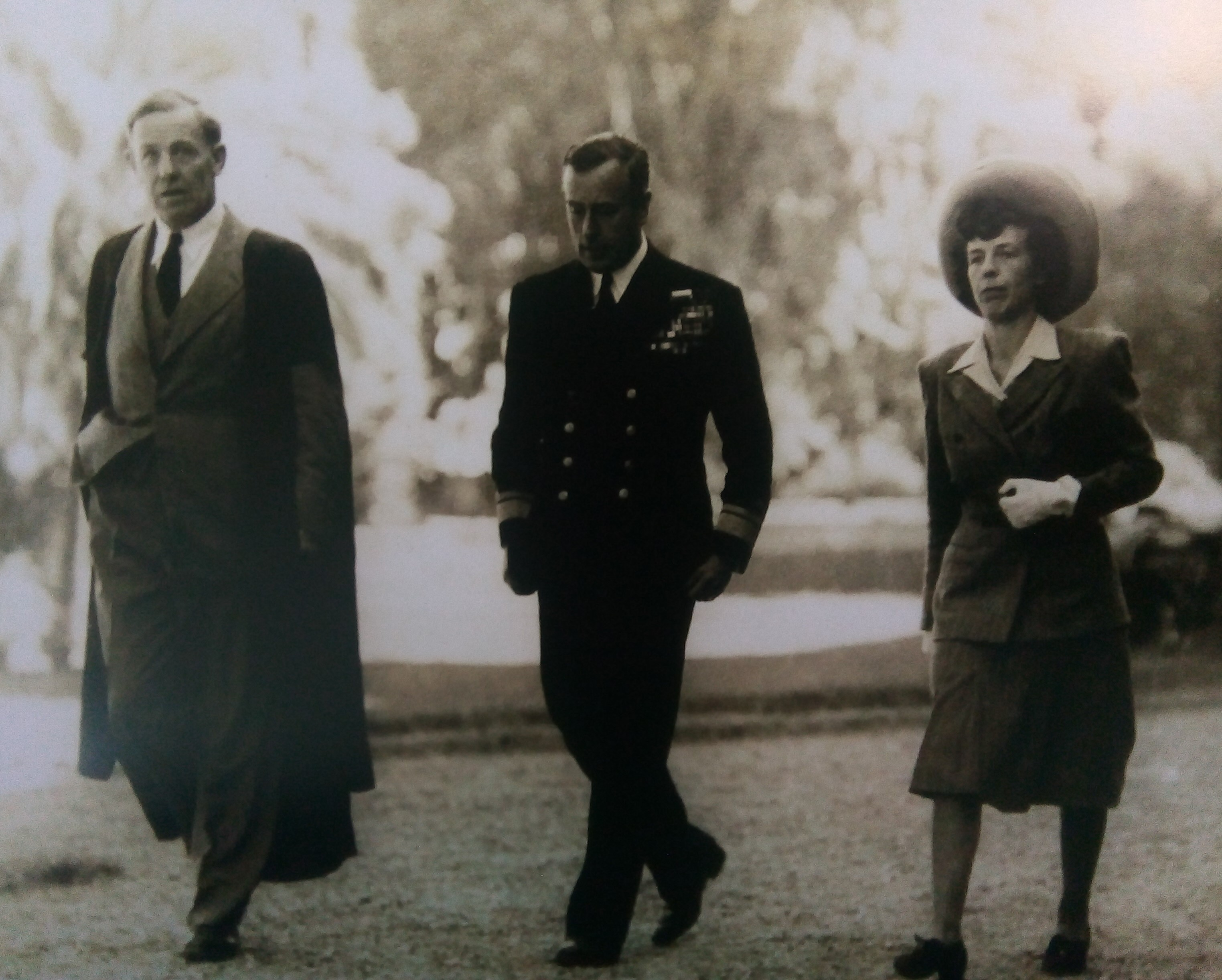
Arthur Foot and his daughter Sylvia Hartell with Lord Mountbatten, during the latter's visit to the school on 13 February 1948.

... By 14 he should have learnt all the ordinary principles of social behaviour. He should know how to stand up and speak to a variety of different types of people – to his own mother, to someone else's mother, to his father, to his schoolmasters, to servants, to Mahatma Gandhi or to the Viceroy, and to do this without any self-consciousness ...At 17 must come another quality, less instinctive and requiring a maturer mind: he must acquire a capacity of judgement. ...

— Arthur Foot, 1946, The Objects of Education

In 1947, there were around 295 boys studying at Doon, out of which 58-69 were Muslims, 19-20 Sikhs, 11-24 Parsees, 6-7 Christians, and the remaining two-thirds Hindu. The first cohort of students left school in 1938, and during the Second World War, about 65 Doon students served in the Army, Navy or Air Force. In 1948, Foot returned to England for "unknown reasons", and John Martyn became the second headmaster. After the Indian Independence, Martyn's friends suggested it would be a mistake to stay on in India, but he later wrote: "They could not have been more wrong. I have found my life much pleasanter than before...although no one had previously ever done or said anything to make me feel at all unwelcome, from now on it was often made quite explicit that I was very welcome." While Foot and Martyn were determined to model Doon on Eton and Harrow, they both agreed that Doon should cater primarily for Indian boys—and not the sons of British expatriates—in order to create a uniquely Indian public school rather than a transplanted British institution. Foot did not want Doon to be considered elitist. In a paper surveying the new school, presented to the Royal Society of Arts, London in 1947, Foot wrote: "In language we have never intended to base our instruction on the Classics in the way that Latin is still the centre pin of the English Public School. The great majority of boys take Urdu or Hindi." Martyn retired as headmaster in 1966 and became a managing trustee of Indian Cheshire Homes.

=== Middle years: 1970–2000 ===
Headmasters
- Arthur E. Foot, 1935–1948
- J. A. K. Martyn, 1948–1966
- C. J. Miller, 1966–1970
- Eric J. Simeon, 1970–1979
- Gulab Ramchandani, 1979–1988
- Shomie Das, 1988–1996
- John A. Mason, 1996–2003
- Kanti Bajpai, 2003–2009
- Peter McLaughlin, 2009–2016
- Matthew Raggett, 2016–2020
- Jagpreet Singh, 2020–present

The school's first Indian headmaster was Eric Simeon, appointed in 1970. He came from a military background and laid great emphasis on disciplined living. Simeon's tenure of nine years was marked with financial difficulties for the school and the estate suffered, as the funds were not enough to maintain buildings and facilities. In 1971, Simeon introduced the 'Scholar's Blazer', an academic equivalent of the pre-existing prize 'Games Blazer', so that boys accorded academic excellence the same level of prestige as they did sporting achievements. In 1979, Gulab Ramchandani became the first alumnus to be appointed headmaster, and during his term the school regained financial stability. In 1988, Shomie Das, another alumnus and the grandson of school founder Satish Ranjan Das, became headmaster. Das's focus was on upgrading the school infrastructure, and during his time the Oberoi house was added to the original four houses. The next headmaster, John Mason, appointed in 1996, planned on making Doon more affordable to school pupils. The school did not raise its fees while Mason was in office.

==== Criticism of Rajiv Gandhi administration ====
In the 1980s, the then Prime Minister Rajiv Gandhi, an alumnus, drew criticism from the media for appointing many old boys to his administration. His inner circle was labelled a "Doon Cabinet" or "Dosco Mafia", and Washington Post reported,

The catch phrase around Delhi these days is that the 'Doon School runs India,' but that is too simple an analysis for a complex, chaotic country with so many competing spheres of influence.

Gandhi's reliance on Doon alumni for political advice later led Prime Minister Morarji Desai to remark, "If I had anything to do with this place, I'd close it down". Although any alumnus seldom held public office for some time afterwards, this changed with the political ascendance of Jyotiraditya Madhavrao Scindia, Naveen Patnaik, and Rahul Gandhi.

=== Recent years: 2000–present ===
Kanti Bajpai was the third old boy, after Gulab Ramchandani and Shomie Das, to become headmaster, when appointed to the post in 2003. He introduced numerous punishments, notably "yellow cards" (informally known as 'YCs'), to control an outburst of bullying at Doon. In 2006, Bajpai found himself embroiled in a controversy when the parents of Hindu and Sikh students complained on discovering that the school's dining hall only serves halal meat. The fact came to light after a visiting Pakistani delegation was assured of their meal's halal status. Despite mounting pressure, the school's board of governors appealed for maintaining the status quo. As of 2016, the school was serving both halal and non-halal (jhatka) meat varieties in the dining hall. In 2009, Peter McLaughlin, an Irish academic, was chosen to lead the school, becoming the first non-Indian headmaster in almost four decades.

==== 2010 Founder's Day celebrations and film controversy ====
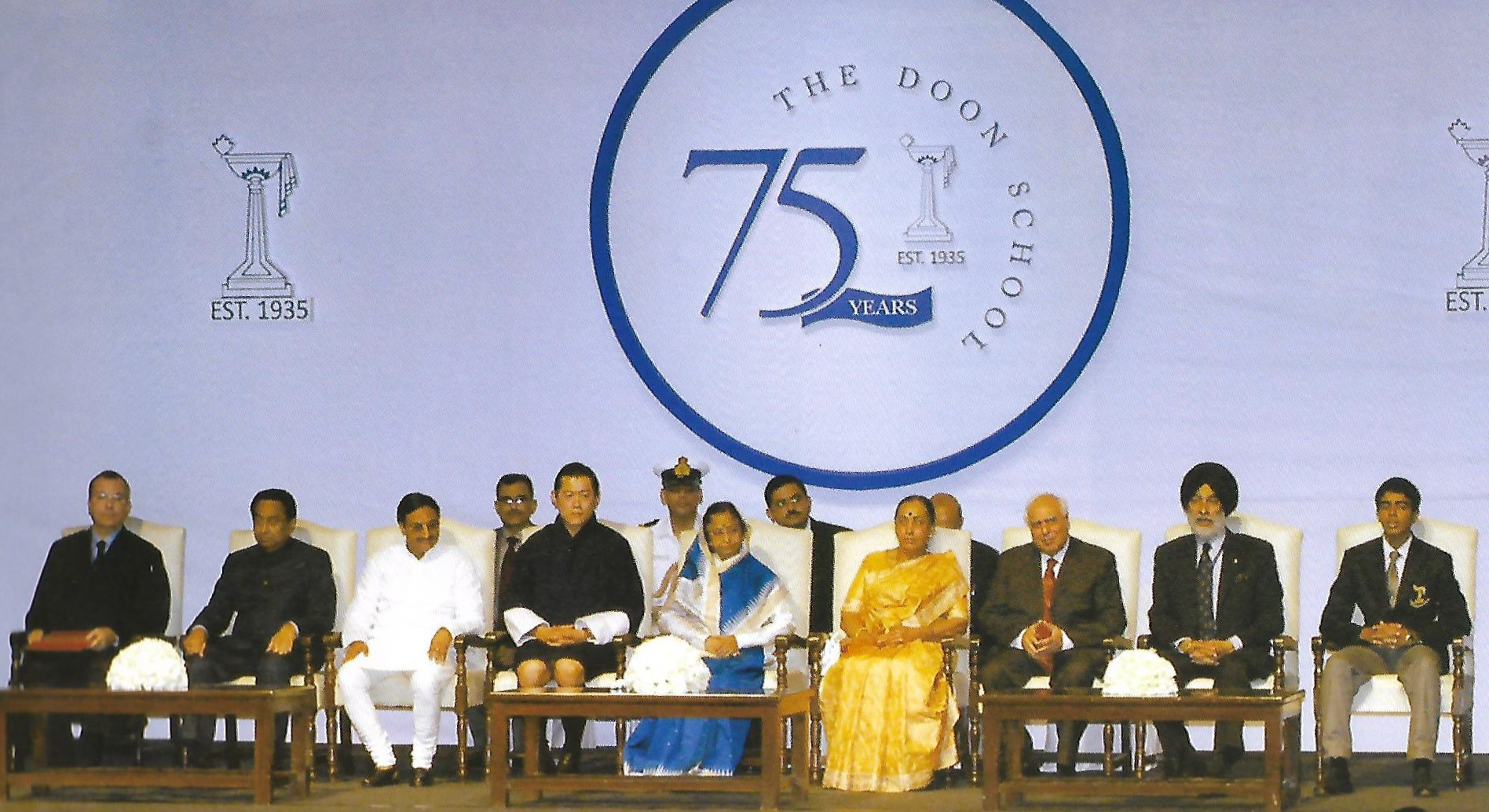
Main event at the 75th Founder's Day in October 2010, with chief guest President Pratibha Patil, and other dignitaries including King of Bhutan Jigme Khesar Namgyel Wangchuck, Chief Minister Ramesh Pokhriyal, Governor Margaret Alva, and Minister of Human Resource Development, Kapil Sibal.

Founder's Day is a three-four day event in the autumn term, usually October, that marks the school's founding and draws many ex-pupils from all parts of the world. The chief guest is usually a prominent person, and the events include exhibitions, productions of plays, yoga sessions, live bands, a fete and an orchestral concert given by members of the school's Music Society. Doon celebrated its 75th Founder's Day in 2010 and programmed events on an unprecedented scale. The event was christened DS-75. Among the chief guests were the then President of India Pratibha Patil, King Jigme Khesar Namgyel Wangchuck of Bhutan, and Kapil Sibal, then minister of Human Resource Development. Pratibha Patil, in her address, urged the school authorities to make Doon a co-educational institution. One of the main events was a discussion, dubbed the "Chandbagh Debate", held between alumni including Vikram Seth, Kamal Nath, Manpreet Singh Badal, Jyotiraditya Madhavrao Scindia and retired headmaster Kanti Bajpai, on the topic Can India lead?. It was moderated by television commentator Karan Thapar, an alumnus of the school.

Ashvin Kumar, an alumnus and Oscar-nominated director, made the film Dazed in Doon for the celebrations, using pupils for the cast and crew. Most of it was shot in June and July during the summer break, and those scenes which required the entire student body were filmed after the school reopened in August. It was screened on the final day of celebrations to a gathering of over 2000 people, including guests, students, parents and alumni. The day after screening, the school objected to the film and its distribution, labelling the bullying scenes "defamatory", and obtained a court order to delay its release. The DVD sales on campus were immediately halted. The dispute remains unresolved between the director and school authorities. On 22 October 2010, a commemorative postage stamp depicting the school's main building was released by the Indian Postal Service to mark the occasion of the 75th Founder's Day.

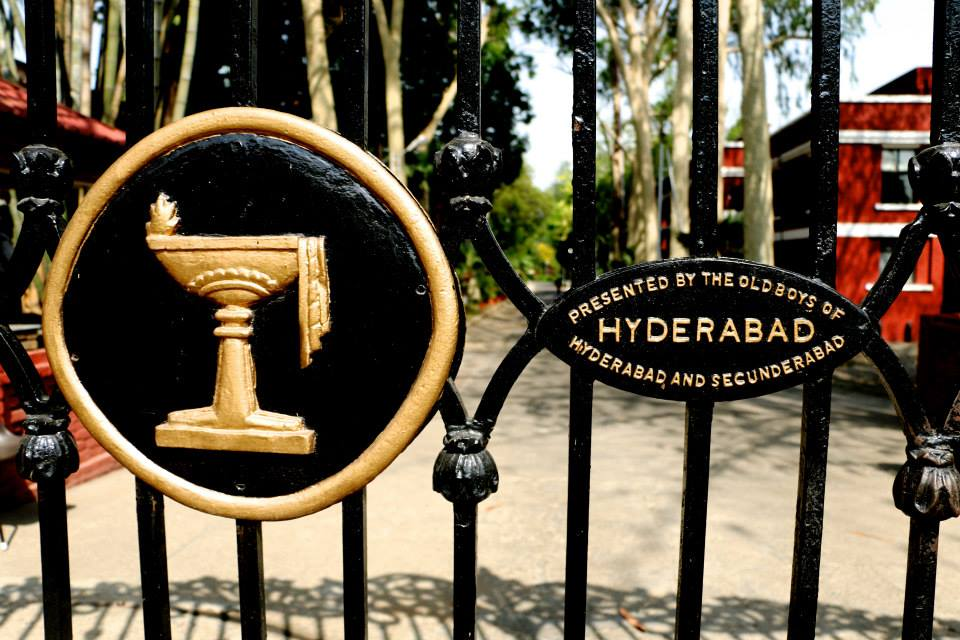
In March 2020, the school closed for the first time since its founding, following the COVID-19 outbreak.

==== Present day ====
In June 2016, the school announced the appointment of Matthew Raggett, principal of the Leipzig International School's secondary department, to succeed Peter McLaughlin as headmaster. Until the start of McLaughlin's headmastership, the student demographic was dominated by boys hailing from the North Indian states. To make the school more diverse, Raggett continued McLaughlin's outreach initiative of inviting more applications from boys in South and Northeast Indian states. The school was the subject of a 2018 Channel 4 documentary series called Indian Summer School, which was based on a social experiment to see if five under-performing British boys would thrive in Doon. In January 2020, Matthew Raggett stepped down as the tenth headmaster citing personal reasons. In March 2020, the school was shut down for the first time since its founding in 1935, and boys were sent home due to the COVID-19 pandemic and the Indian lockdown. Online classes were being conducted for students through video conferencing apps. Jagpreet Singh was appointed the eleventh headmaster of Doon in April 2020; he is a member of the Headmasters' and Headmistresses' Conference, UK.

== Governance and organisation ==
The school is owned by the non-profit entity Indian Public Schools' Society (IPSS), which was registered by S.R. Das in 1928 with the aim of establishing public schools in India. Under the IPSS, the Board of Governors supervises all matters of Doon. The current board comprises thirteen members. The president of The Doon School Old Boys' Society has a seat on the board to represent the views and interests of the alumni. At the intramural level, the School Council, comprising the headmaster, heads of department, staff and student representatives from each house, is responsible for legislating and discussing school policies. Every house holds a vote to send four student representatives to the council. Each house is run by a housemaster or a housemistress, along with a house captain and a team of prefects. The housemistress is assisted by a matron known as "The Dame", who provides pastoral care for pupils, some of whom take several weeks to adjust fully to life in a boarding school, particularly given Doon's monastic lifestyle and strict routine. The homes of housemasters and housemistresses are adjacent or physically attached to their houses to enable close supervision and support. One senior boy serves as school captain, chosen by teachers and students at the start of the year by voting in a secret ballot.

=== Houses ===
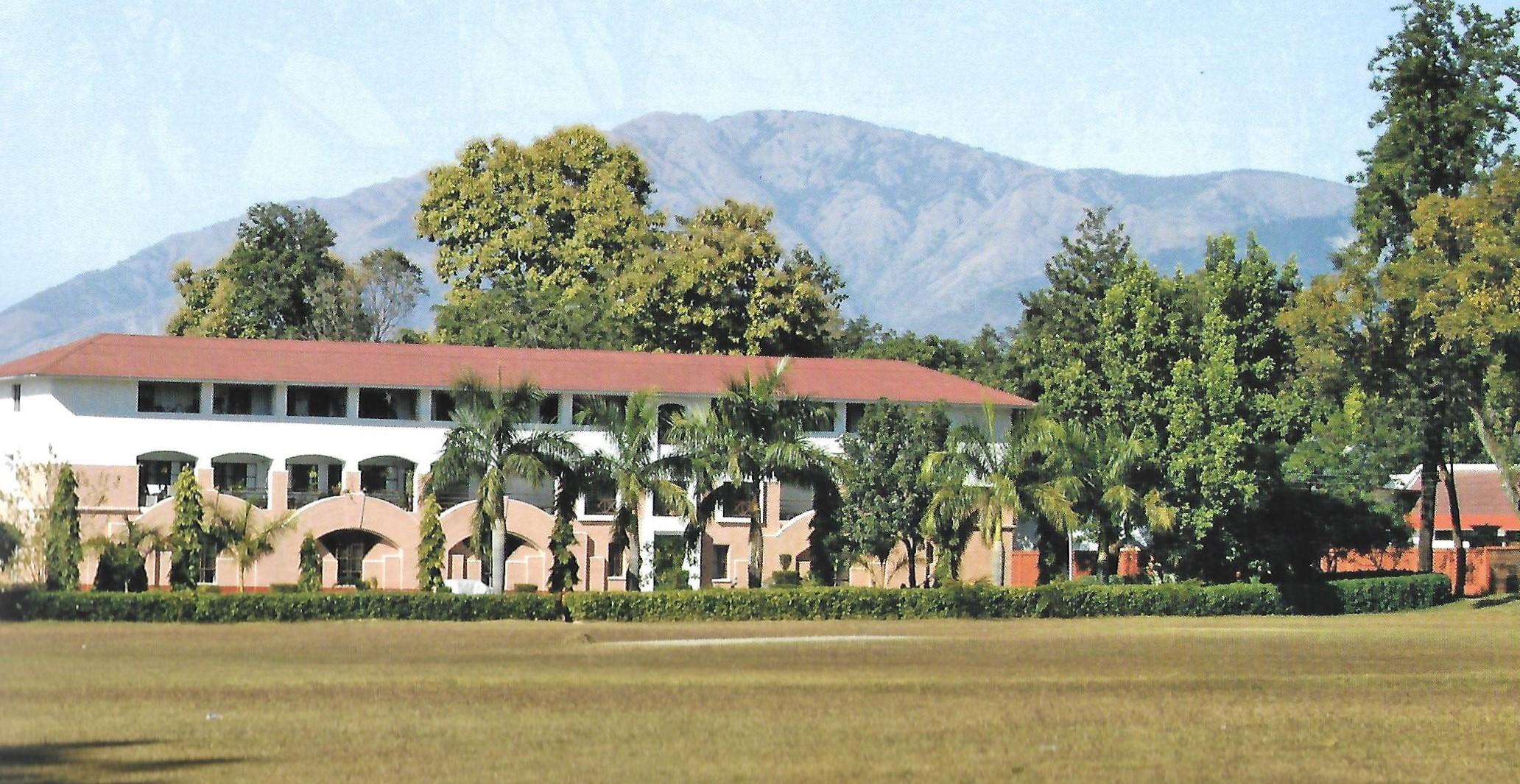
Foot House, across Skinner's Field, with Sivalik Hills in the background.

House name and Colours
House	Colour	Swatch
Kashmir	Yellow	
Tata	Red	
Oberoi	Blue	
Jaipur	Green	
Hyderabad	Navy Blue	
Martyn		
Foot		

Doon follows the house system; there are five main houses (Hyderabad, Jaipur, Kashmir, Tata and Oberoi) and two 'holding houses' (Foot and Martyn, named after former headmasters), for boys in their first year. The four houses were named after the largest initial donors: Hyderabad House was named after Akbar Hydari, who secured a contribution from Nizam of Hyderabad's government; Kashmir, after Maharajah Hari Singh, then ruler of Jammu and Kashmir; Tata, after the Tata Trusts; and Jaipur, after Rai Bahadur Amarnath Atal arranged for contributions from the Durbar of Jaipur. Boys are assigned to houses at the time of admission and develop great loyalty to them, since all intramural sports involve fierce competition between houses. Those who have a family history with a particular house are assigned to the same house. All houses have rooms, dormitories, kitchen, library, study rooms, and a Common Room for recreation.

=== Admission, fees and financial aid ===
The school receives about 540 applications every year and admits 80 students in seventh grade and 14 in eighth grade, although these numbers have varied over time. Once admission is secured, after passing the entrance examination and interview, a student may apply for around 30 scholarships or bursaries. Some are reserved for boys proficient in sports or arts, and others for those from particular regions or the children of armed forces personnel. As of August 2022, the annual school fees for Indian students was ₹11,20,000, and ₹14,00,000 for foreign nationals or non-resident Indians. The monetary value of financial aid ranges from fifty per cent of the tuition fee to being fully funded. Amidst criticism from parents over rising fees, the last headmaster, Matthew Raggett, has stated that over 25% of Doon's students receive needs-based bursaries, and the school is working towards a completely needs-blind admission policy.

== Campus ==
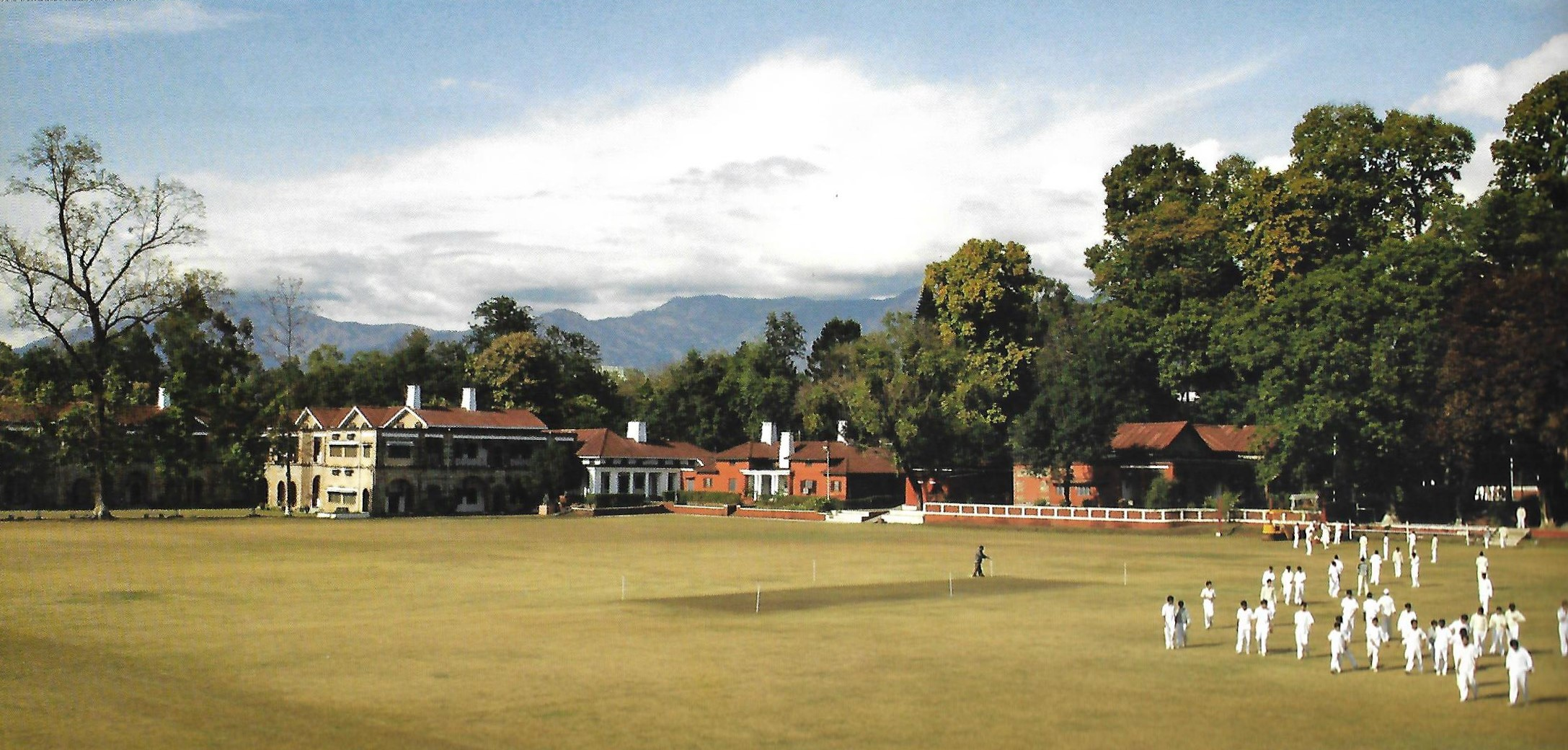
Main Field of the school with Hyderabad House in the background, and beyond, the Mussoorie range.

The school is spread across a single campus covering approximately 72 acres (290,000 m^{2}) flanked by Chakrata Road and Mall Road in the Dehradun Cantonment area of Dehradun city, Uttarakhand, India. To house the school, the IPSS acquired the Chandbagh Estate in Dehradun from the Uttar Pradesh Public Works Department on a 100-year lease of one rupee per year. This lease continues to date, having been since transferred to the Indian Armed Forces overseeing the Dehradun Cantonment. Part of the estate was once a deer park. The IPSS also acquired an adjoining estate, now known as Skinner's Field, from the descendants of James Skinner. The buildings on campus include the Main Building, which houses offices and classrooms, structures for sports facilities, science blocks, music school, library, arts and media centre, auditorium, amphitheatre, dining hall, wellness centre, recycling and waste-treatment plants, and masters' residences.

=== Architecture ===
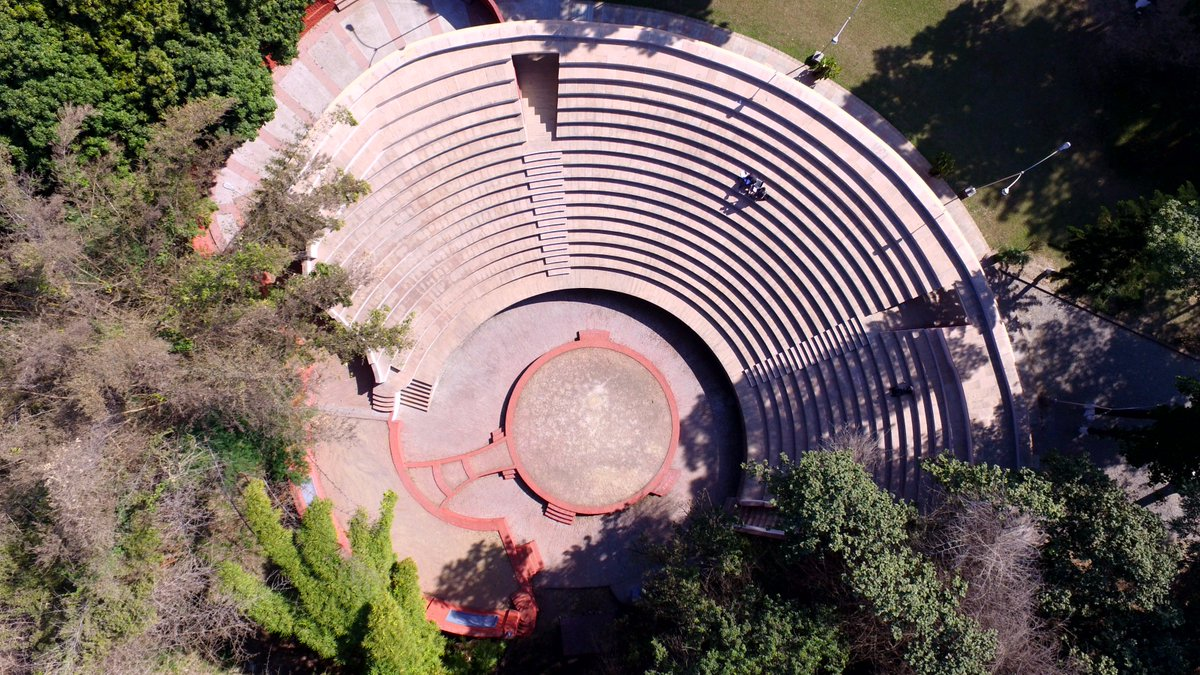
The school's amphitheatre, known as Rose Bowl, was constructed by the boys and masters in the early-1930s over two years. It was refurbished in 2009.

The construction of the Main Building, then in FRI, was carried out by Imperial Public Works Department, and finished in 1911. Its Renaissance-style architecture was inspired by Basilica Palladiana in Vicenza, Italy. Many buildings on the campus have been designed by notable Indian architects or firms. The library was designed by Romi Khosla, the Biology block by Ram Sharma, teachers' residences by Anagram Architects, and the new Arts and Media Centre, which was inaugurated in October 2010 and shortlisted for the 2010 World Architecture News Education Award, by alumnus Sandeep Khosla The Arts and Media Centre houses painting, ceramic, sculpture, and textile studios, along with a lecture hall, film and photography studio, publications' room and exhibition galleries. In 2016, the school's Main Building received the "Honourable Mention" under the UNESCO Asia-Pacific Awards for Cultural Heritage Conservation, following the conservation work carried out by Aishwarya Tipnis Architects on the more than a century-old building.

=== Natural environment ===
The school estate, known as Chandbagh (Urdu for "garden of the moon"), lies in the green zone of the city and occupies the former site of the Imperial Forest Research Institute, now Forest Research Institute. Before the school's opening, the site had been the centre of forestry in India for three decades, and, today, a wide variety of flora and fauna are found on campus, including many rare trees that date back to the days of the FRI. The school has over 150 species of trees on its campus, and the formal gardens attract a variety of birds. The school is listed as a hotspot on the eBird database of Cornell Lab of Ornithology, and 169 bird species had been identified on the campus as of February 2026. In the 1940–50s, ornithologist Salim Ali, who was a friend of Foot, Gibson and Martyn, was a regular visitor to the school; he sensitized generations of pupils to the natural diversity of the school campus, and introduced them to many aspects of ornithology. In 1996, a book titled Trees of Chandbagh was released which provided a comprehensive account of vegetation found on Doon's campus. Along similar lines, the illustrated book Birds of Chandbagh: A Guide To Birding at The Doon School was released in 2019, featuring photographs, illustrations and QR codes documenting the bird calls of the species found on campus. The school has devised an Architectural and Projects Committee, which ensures that any construction taking place on campus is done without disturbing the ecological balance of the wooded school grounds.

== Curriculum ==
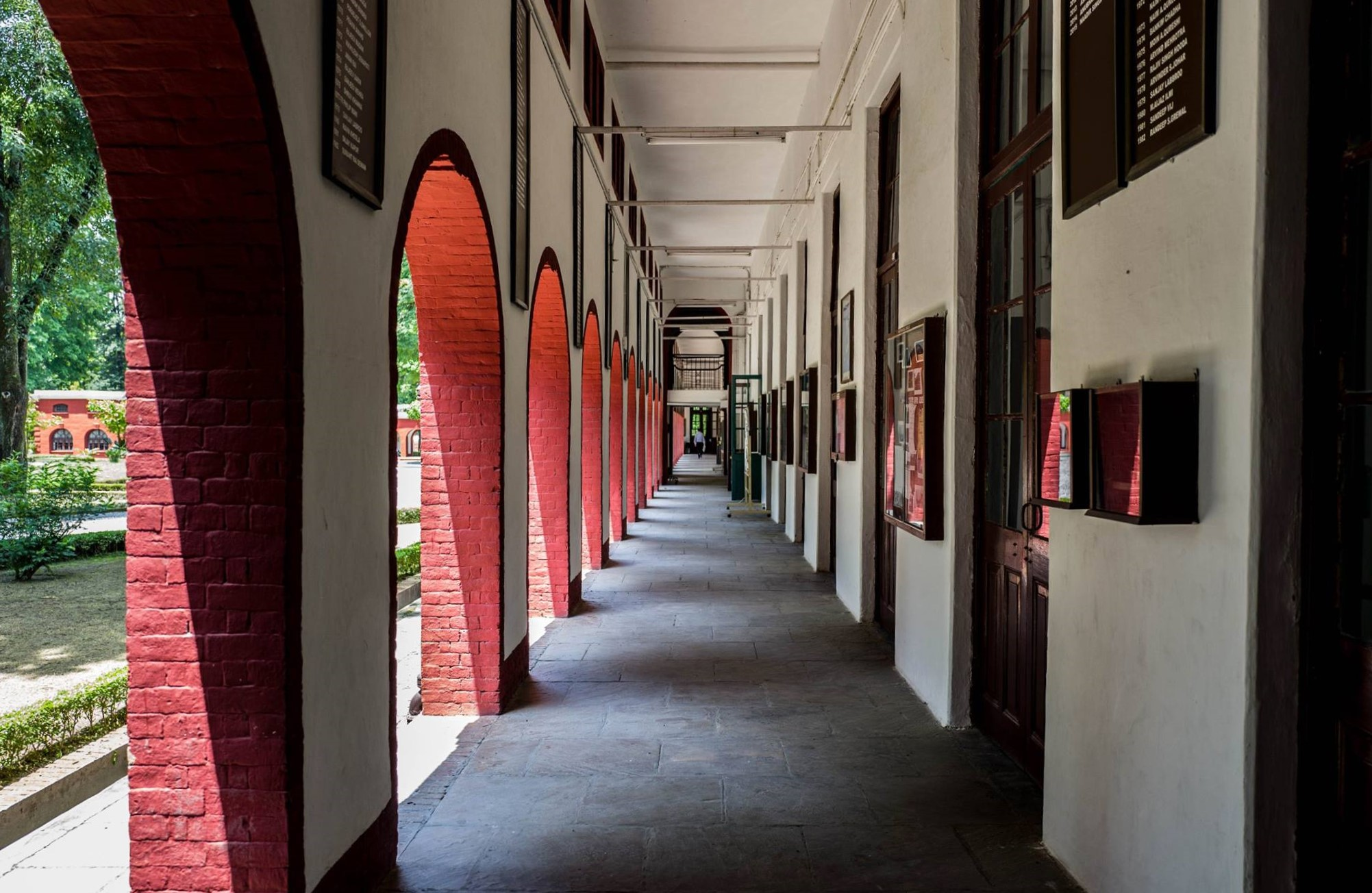
Ground-floor corridor of the school's Main Building, which houses classrooms and offices.

The school practices a five-and-a-half-day week consisting of 40 periods (or "schools"), each of 40 minutes. The school day begins with boys having chhota haazri before doing calisthenics outdoors on the playing fields, which is then followed by classes. On Sundays, boys are free to pursue any activity or sport. Senior boys may go into the town for leisure on designated Sundays, after taking permission from the housemaster of their respective houses. The student-teacher ratio at the school is 10:1. Doon pupils take the International General Certificate of Secondary Education (IGCSE) exams in tenth grade, which replaced Indian Certificate of Secondary Education in 2017, and are thereafter offered two strands for the final two years: International Baccalaureate (IB) or Indian School Certificate (ISC).

The academic year has three terms: spring, summer and autumn. The autumn term runs from August to the year-end final examinations in November, after which the boys are promoted to the new class in February. Each term has a "test week" and end-of-term examinations known as "trials". Boys are able to visit teachers, most of whom live on campus, for further academic help. Additionally, each boy is assigned a 'Tutor' – a School Master affiliated with their boarding house – who is responsible for their pastoral welfare and may coordinate academic help when requested. Subjects on offer include geography, political science, history, economics, accountancy, commerce, environmental studies, art and design, psychology, music, English, Hindi, Sanskrit and STEM subjects. Doon's foreign language offerings include French, German and Spanish. The school's Careers Information, Education and Guidance Department has offered pupils guidance on career paths, college applications, entrance exams and standardized tests like the SAT and ACT. In recent years, boys have increasingly chosen foreign universities over Indian colleges, sometimes due to the hyper-competitiveness of the Indian higher education system that calls for extremely high school-leaving scores for admissions.

=== Traditions ===
The early headmasters and teachers at Doon came from traditional British public schools, and the jargon introduced by them is still in use. For example, the weekly masters' meeting, started by Foot, is called Chambers, a term taken from Eton, and evening "prep" (the boarding-school equivalent of homework) is called toye-time, a term taken from Winchester College. The school songs were deliberately chosen to include both Urdu poetry and Hindu bhajans as a way of emphasising Doon's secular ethos; similarly, the school prayers include a mix of Anglican hymns and Indian poetry representing different geo-linguistic regions of the country. Attendance at the morning assembly is required of all pupils and teachers. It traditionally begins with a song from the school's song book, which contains poetry, hymns and bhajans, including Jana Gana Mana by Rabindranath Tagore, Chisti Ne Jis Zamin Mein by Muhammad Iqbal, Anand Loke by Rabindranath Tagore, Lab Pe Aati Hai Dua by Muhammad Iqbal, Ghungat Ke Pat Khol Re (attributed to Meerabai), Vande Mataram (from a poem by Bankim Chandra Chattopadhyay). Although Jana Gana Mana is India's national anthem, it is traditionally referred to as "Song No. 1" at Doon since it was adopted as the school song in 1935, fifteen years before it became India's national anthem. Social work, known formally as "Socially Useful Productive Work" (SUPW), is also part of school life. All boys of the school must complete a mandatory quota of social service hours every term, which is also required by both curricula offered at the school (the International Baccalaureate referring to this as Creativity, Activity and Service or 'CAS'). Though, previously, students that did not complete their hours of work were required to stay back at school over the holidays for a brief period, this has been relaxed in recent years. Doon also oversees a Panchayat Ghar (or 'village house') teaching impoverished children, and many building projects and workshops for the local community. Pupils and alumni have frequently helped local villages of organised efforts across India to assist people affected by natural disasters. During the 1991 Uttarkashi earthquake, the school's amateur radio club was used by the government for communication purposes.

== Extracurricular activities ==
=== Sports ===
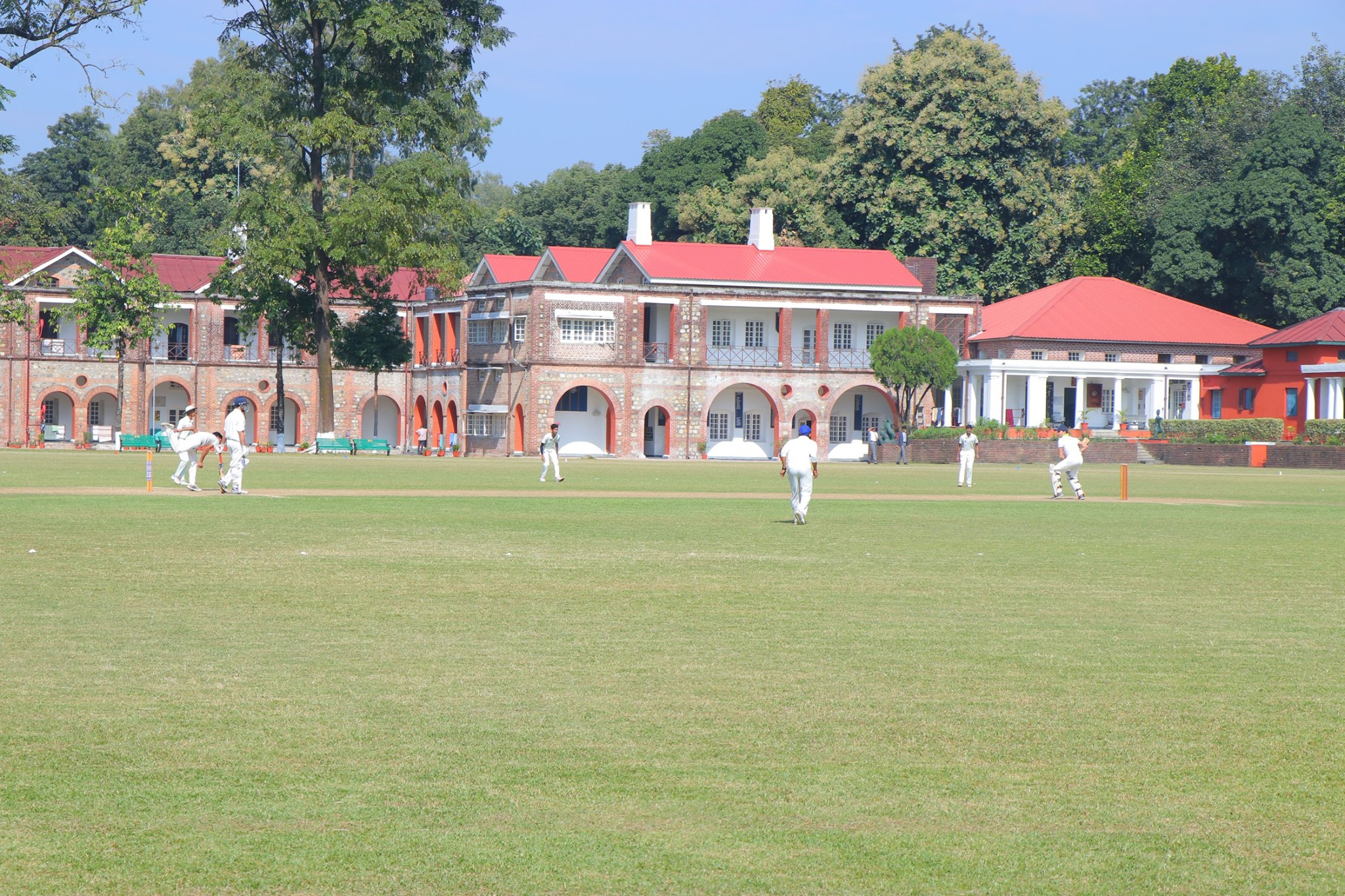
A cricket game in progress on the Main Field.

Sports are compulsory for pupils. The school has over 30 acres (120,000 m^{2}) of playing fields, the largest of which are Skinner Field and the Main Field. Cricket and hockey dominate the sports calendar in spring term, while football, athletics and boxing are played in autumn term. Other sports such as tennis, table tennis, badminton, squash, basketball, swimming and gymnastics are played all-year round. Inter-house matches are played in cricket, hockey, football, boxing and basketball. Sports facilities include a 25-metre swimming pool, a boxing ring and a multi-purpose hall with a gymnasium, yoga studio, and facilities for indoor badminton, basketball and table tennis. There are two artificial turf cricket pitches, five basketball courts, four tennis courts, four squash courts, eight cricket nets, seven fields for hockey and football (which can be converted to four cricket pitches to accommodate seasonal sports), a modern cricket pavilion and two 400-metre athletics tracks. In 2014, the school inaugurated a shooting range on campus. Golf is offered to boys in partnership with local golf courses. Doon hosts the annual Afzal Khan Memorial Basketball Tournament, an inter-school tournament that draws all major school basketball teams of India. Boys visit other schools and academies from time to time to take part in various tournaments. For skill improvement, the school often invites professional sports bodies to hold training camps, which are usually open to students from across India. In 2013, a football coaching camp was held in association with Barça Academy, the official training school of FC Barcelona, and in January 2015, coaches from the Marylebone Cricket Club held a week-long cricket training camp on the school grounds.

=== Clubs and societies ===
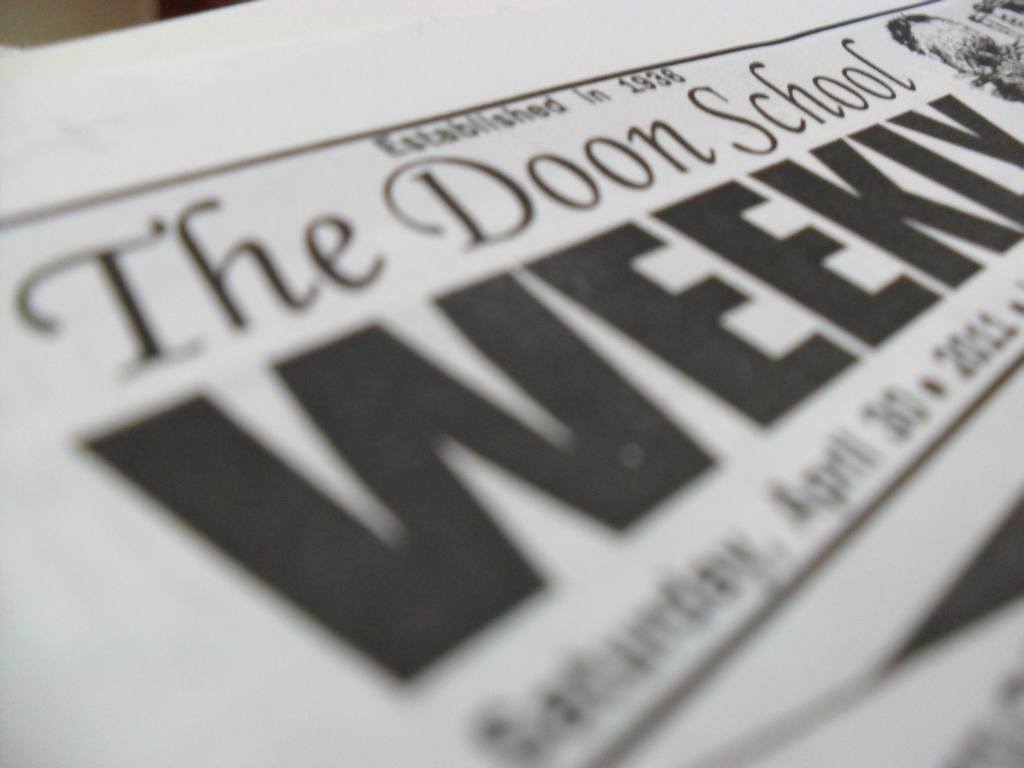
The Doon School Weekly, established in 1936, is the oldest publication of Doon. It is produced by the boys and distributed every Saturday morning.

Extracurricular activities are also a compulsory element of school life. There are around 70-80 clubs and societies, including astronomy, business, The Doon School Model United Nations, quiz, photography and film, aeromodelling, robotics, paper recycling, weather reporting, pottery, carpentry, amateur radio (school call sign: VU2CHC) and birdwatching, among others. In many societies pupils come together to discuss a particular topic, presided over by a schoolmaster and often including a guest speaker. The school has often invited prominent figures to give speeches and talks to the students; these have included heads of state, politicians, ornithologists, naturalists, artists, writers, economists, diplomats and industrialists.

Boys can write for, or join the editorial board of, a number of school magazines that are published in English or Hindi. The Doon School Weekly, established in 1936, is the oldest publication and the official school newspaper. Distributed every Saturday morning, and edited by pupils, it chronicles school activities and is a platform for creative, political or humorous writing. The publication aims to represent the views of the school community as well as Old Boys, and include satire and criticism of school policies. More subversive publications, critical of teachers and the school establishment, have occasionally been produced without official sponsorship. Other magazines include The Yearbook, a heavily illustrated publication for recording all highlights of the school year, and The Doon School Information Review for cultural criticism. Specialist publications by academic departments include Vibgyor (Art), Echo (Science), The Econocrat (Economics), Infinity (Mathematics), Grand Slam (Sports) and The Circle (History and Political Science).

=== Trekking and mountaineering ===
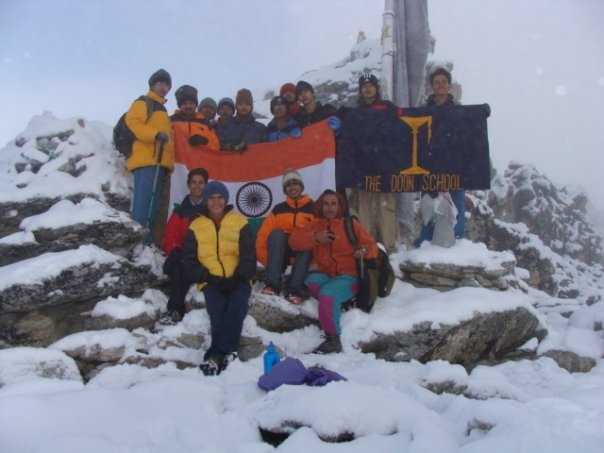
2008 expedition to the Mount Everest Base Camp and Kala Patthar.

Halfway through each term, the boys go on a one-week "midterm", an expedition through the Siwalik Hills or Himalayas. Senior boys make treks of up to five days, unaccompanied by teachers, camping out in tents and cooking their own food. The trips are planned by students themselves. Alumni have recalled these midterms as formative and character-building experiences. Doon has been credited with pioneering mountaineering in India, due to the accomplishments of masters such as R. L. Holdsworth, Jack Gibson and Gurdial Singh, and alumni like Nandu Jayal, who later became the founder principal of Himalayan Mountaineering Institute. Notable climbs by staff and alumni include Bandarpunch (6,316 m) in 1950, Kala Nag (6,387 m) in 1956, Trisul (7,120 m) in 1951, Kamet (7,756 m) in 1955, Abi Gamin (7,355 m) in 1953 and 1955, Mrigthuni (6,855 m) in 1958 and Jaonli (6,632 metres) in 1964. Some of these expeditions have been noted for their idiosyncrasies. After Gurdial Singh led a successful climb of Trisul, he performed a headstand asana on the summit as a tribute to the Hindu god Shiva, who is said to abide there. Holdsworth smoked a pipe on reaching the summit of Kamet (7,756 m), during its first ascent in 1931. Two Doon pupils climbed the Matterhorn in 1951 wearing cricket boots.

=== Theatre and music ===
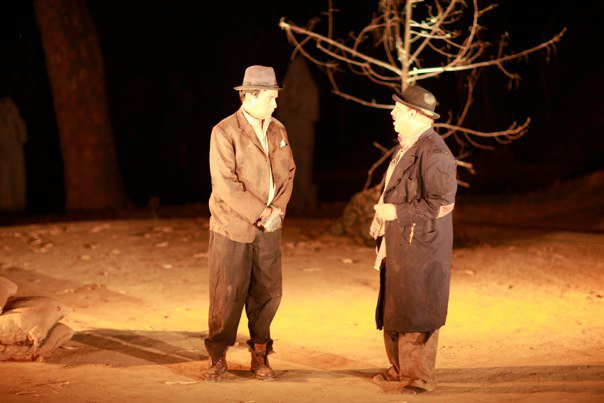
Samuel Beckett's Waiting for Godot being staged in the open-air theatre, Rose Bowl.

An amphitheatre known as the Rose Bowl was built largely by pupils and masters in two years during the 1930s and underwent a major structural change in 2009. It can seat up to 2,000 people and has been the setting for numerous plays as well as musical performances and speeches during school ceremonies such as Founder's Day. The Multi-Purpose Hall is a more modern indoor theatre that can accommodate approximately 2,000 people. Plays are regularly staged in English and Hindi, with 8–9 productions each year including 2 major productions, which usually have a larger cast and budget, as part of the Founder's Day celebrations. The Inter House Once-Act Play competition is held each year, alternatively in English and Hindi. The stage design, sound design, stage lighting, and much of the set construction are the responsibility of the pupils.

In 2001, a new music school was built beside the Rose Bowl. It houses a music library, a concert hall and several practice and teaching rooms where students learn various western and Indian instruments. Pupils of the school have an option to appear for the Trinity Guildhall music examinations, conducted by Trinity College London, in piano, violin, drums and classical guitar. In 2002, the school choir raised ₹2 million for victims of the 2001 Gujarat earthquake by organising a charity concert with the title Concerto 2000, in which drummer Sivamani also took part. To commemorate its 75th Founder's Day in 2010, the school launched a music album, called Spirit of Doon in collaboration with EMI. The tracks were written by the lyricist Gulzar and were sung by the school choir, Sonu Nigam, Shayan Italia and Bhajan Sopori.

== Affiliations and partnerships ==
From its foundation in 1937 until the early 1980s, Welham Boys' School was a feeder school for Doon School and Mayo College. This ended when Surendra Kandhari, an old boy and former housemaster at Doon, became principal of Welham and transformed it into a high school. Families who send their sons to Doon often send their daughters to Welham Girls' School, and many Doon alumni have married alumnae of Welham. The two schools hold an annual "dance social", and their alumni sometimes collaborate in organising events. Pakistani ex-pupils from Doon established the Chand Bagh School 40 km north of Lahore, Pakistan, in 1998, modelling it on the general structure of Doon.

Doon also has exchange programmes with a number of overseas schools, such as Eton College, Harrow School and St Edward's School, Oxford, St. Albans School, Washington, D.C., Millfield, Schule Schloss Salem, The Armidale School, Bridge House School, Deerfield Academy, King's Academy, Stowe School, Scotch College, Melbourne, The Hutchins School and St. Mark's School (Texas). In 2011 Doon twinned with The Thomas Hardye School, Dorchester, England, through a cultural exchange project organised by the BBC and British Council in light of the 2012 Summer Olympics held in the UK. The Doon School is a member of the following organisations: G20 Schools, Round Square, Headmasters' and Headmistresses' Conference, International Boys' Schools Coalition, Indian Public Schools' Conference, Rashtriya Life Saving Society, and International Award Association. The school is the regional test centre for University of Cambridge ESOL Examinations and SAT Tests.

=== Schools with similar names ===
As private schools became more widespread in India, several other schools used "Doon" as part of their names, causing some confusion. Among them are Doon Global School, Doon Presidency School, Doon International School, Doon Preparatory School, Doon Cambridge School, Doon Girls School, Doon Public School (in West Delhi, not the Doon Valley) Doon Heritage School (Siliguri, West Bengal) and the Doon College of Spoken English. None of them are related to The Doon School. Former Headmaster Peter McLaughlin had, during his tenure, sought to copyright the school's name and initiate legal proceedings against institutions falsely presenting themselves as connected to the school, but was unsuccessful.

== Public image ==
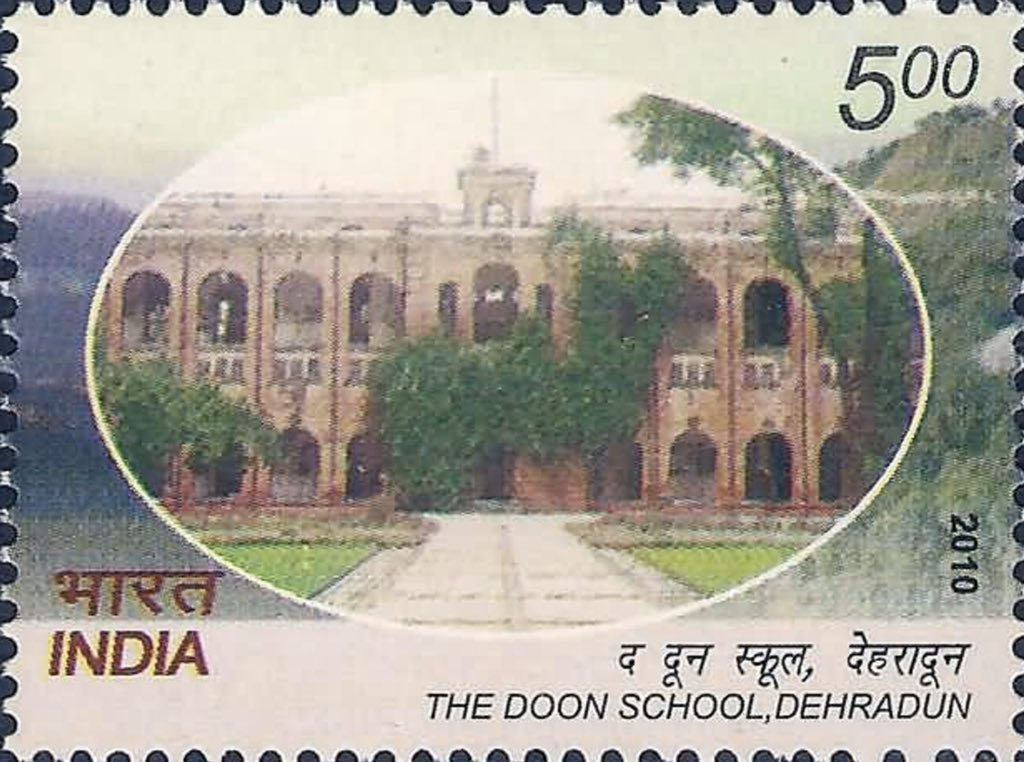
A commemorative postal stamp depicting the school's Main Building was released by India Post on 22 October 2010, to mark Doon's 75th Founder's Day.

Doon in films & television

- The film Dazed in Doon, which was commissioned by the school on the occasion of its 75th anniversary and produced by old boy Ashvin Kumar, was banned by the school authorities because it "doesn't give the school a good name". The dispute remains unresolved.
- In September 2010, BBC Sport made a documentary on the Doon School for the World Olympic Dreams Project. The purpose of the documentary, produced in association with the British Council, was to show where Abhinav Bindra, the first Indian individual Olympic gold medallist, spent his formative years.
- In 2017, Channel 4 of UK commissioned a 3-part documentary, Indian Summer School, where five working-class boys from the UK were given a chance to study at Doon for a term to see if they would benefit from the experience. The filming began in August 2017, and the programmes were broadcast in March–April 2018.
- The 2022 Bollywood sports drama Jersey was filmed at the school, and features its buildings, cricket grounds and pavilion.

Doon in literature

- In Satyajit Ray's novel The Emperor's Ring: The Further Adventures of Feluda, the character Mahabir attended Doon, and was a member of the "first eleven" school cricket team.
- Vikram Seth used his own experiences of being bullied at Doon to model the character of Tapan in A Suitable Boy.
- In Salman Rushdie's short-story anthology East, West, the protagonists Zulu and Chekhov are Doscos.
- In Tenzing Norgay's autobiography Man of Everest, he refers to Bandarpunch as "The Doon School mountain" as the mountain was frequented by two Doon School teachers, Jack Gibson and John Martyn.
- In Ruskin Bond's novella Strangers in the Night (2000), character Jai Shankar is from Doon.
- Penguin's The Great Speeches of Modern India (2011) included Vikram Seth's 1992 Founder's Day address, which being confessional surprised the school community, and Mani Shankar Aiyar's 2007 speech, which was noted for its wit and humour.
- In Aatish Taseer's 2015 novel The Way Things Were, the character named I.P., an English teacher, attended Doon.

Doon in research

- Doon School Chronicles is the first of five ethnographic films, called The Doon School Quintet, made by David MacDougall between 1997 and 2000 about the culture of the school. MacDougall has written of a tendency of some alumni to idealise a Golden Age set in the first decade of the school's life, which sometimes makes them resistant to change.
- Constructing Post-Colonial India: National Character and the Doon School by Sanjay Srivastava is a detailed sociological study of the school's culture and how it has influenced India's national character.
- 'Poor' Children in 'Rich' Schools, a 2005 report by the Institute of Social Studies Trust, discusses why the Doon School has no reservations (quotas for specific social groups) in its admissions process. The post quotes an unnamed student who explains, "passing the Doon School entrance exam means that you have proved yourself worthy of the school. Reserving seats for students seems to imply that the school must prove itself worthy of you."
- In 1969, Asian Survey (then Asian Review) – an Asian studies academic journal of University of California, Berkeley – produced a report on The Doon School as a part of their project which documented Indian history after the entry of the East India Company.
- In Indian Tales of the Raj, Zareer Masani studies how Doon School's alumni affected the Indian political scene in the '60s.

Doon in media

- In 2009, Pakistani-American terrorist and Lashkar-e-Taiba operative David Coleman Headley was arrested by the U.S. Federal Bureau of Investigation for allegedly planning attacks on The Doon School, among other educational institutions in India. Questioning of Headley revealed that the Lashkar-e-Taiba had planned to either kidnap or take hostage students from prominent families. The revelations resulted in heavy media coverage of the school and enhanced security measures, including armed personnel of the Uttarakhand Police being deployed to guard the school's perimeter for several months. Since then, the school has invested heavily in security measures, including a Local Guard Force and barbed wire along its walls.

== Notable alumni ==
Pupils of The Doon School, known as "Doscos." The alumni body is predominantly Indian, though it historically included students from what is now Pakistan prior to the Partition of India in 1947; relations between Indian and Pakistani alumni have remained cordial despite later political tensions. Students from Bangladesh and Nepal have also attended the school. Pupils of Doon have achieved prominence in politics, government service, the armed forces of India and Pakistan, commerce, journalism, the arts and literature.

=== Politics ===
In politics, they include cabinet ministers, chief ministers, several members of the Indian Parliament and state Legislative Assemblies, diplomats, and former heads of the Indian and Pakistani Air Forces.

- Rajiv Gandhi, former Prime Minister of India
- Mani Shankar Aiyar, politician
- Ghulam Jilani Khan, former Defence Secretary of Pakistan
- Kamal Nath, former Chief Minister of Madhya Pradesh
- Rahul Gandhi, Leader of the Opposition in Lok Sabha
- Naveen Patnaik (Class of 1964), former Chief Minister of Odisha
- Jyotiraditya Madhavrao Scindia, politician
- Karan Singh, politician and poet

=== Social Work / Activism ===
- Bunker Roy (Class of 1962), founder, Barefoot College

=== Literature ===
- Vikram Seth (Class of 1969), novelist and poet, author of A Suitable Boy and The Golden Gate
- Amitav Ghosh (Class of 1972), author of the Ibis trilogy and The Hungry Tide
- Ardashir Vakil, novelist
- Ramachandra Guha, historian

=== Journalism ===
- Prannoy Roy, founder of NDTV
- Aroon Purie, founder of India Today
- Karan Thapar, journalist
- Virendra Prabhakar, journalist
- Vikram Chandra, journalist

=== Academia / Scholars ===
- Lovraj Kumar, India's first Rhodes scholar

=== Sports ===
- Abhinav Bindra, India's first Olympic gold medallist
- Nandu Jayal, mountaineer, founder principal of Himalayan Mountaineering Institute

=== Entertainment ===
- Ali Fazal, actor
- Shiv Pandit, Actor
- Roshan Seth, actor
- Himani Shivpuri, actress
- Chandrachur Singh, actor
- Satyadeep Mishra, actor

=== Art ===
- Sir Anish Kapoor, Turner Prize-winning sculptor
- Vivan Sundaram, artist
- Sohrab Hura, photographer/visual artist
- Abhishek Poddar, art collector, founder of Museum of Art & Photography

=== Business ===
- Analjit Singh, founder, Max Group
- Sunil Kant Munjal, chairman, Hero MotoCorp
- Rahul Akerkar, restaurateur and founder of Indigo and Qualia
- Vikram Lal, founder, Eicher Motors
- Siddhartha Lal, managing director, Royal Enfield
- A. Vellayan, chairman, Murugappa Group
- Ajit Narain Haksar, first Indian chairman of ITC Limited
- R.C. Bhargava, chairman of Maruti Suzuki
- Ajay S. Shriram, managing director, DCM Shriram group
- Sharan Pasricha, CEO, Ennismore hospitality developer; founder of The Hoxton and Gleneagles

== Notable staff ==
- Peter Lawrence, Eton College alumnus
- Jack Gibson, Ripon Grammar School alumnus
- John A. K. Martyn, Harrow alumnus
- R. L. Holdsworth, Harrow alumnus
- Sudhir Khastgir, first art teacher; from Shantiniketan, who joined in 1936 and remained at school for twenty years.
- Chetan Anand, film director and screenwriter; taught at the school (1940–1944).
- Gurdial Singh, joined in 1946 as a geography teacher and led the boys on many expeditions.
- Sheel Vohra, cricketer and mathematics teacher, joined in 1959 and became the longest-serving master in school's history when he retired in 1998.
- Satendra Nandan, taught history at school in the early 1960s
- Ashok Roy, sarod player and music department head from 1977 to 1988.
- Simon Singh, physicist and popular science author; science teacher (1987).
