= Indian Institute of Surveying & Mapping =

National Institute of Geo-informatic Science & Technology
- Established: 6 May 1967; 58 years ago
- Location: Hyderabad, Telangana, India
- Website: www.iism.nic.in

The National Institute of Geo-informatic Science & Technology (NIGST), formerly known as Indian Institute of Surveying & Mapping or Survey Training Institute, is an institution of Survey Education, learning and training. It is situated at the Survey of India campus in Uppal, Hyderabad.

== History ==
Survey of India, the National Survey Organisation of the Government of India was established in 1767. In Post-independence India, the developmental activities and need for defence preparedness brought urgent need to impart training to officers and staff in various aspects of surveying and mapping with state-of-the-art technologies. With this objective, the Centre for Survey Training and Map Production was established at Hyderabad in 1967 with a Human Resource Development Institute within Survey of India under technical assistance from United Nations Development Programme (UNDP). The National Institute of Geo-informatic Science & Technology(erstwhile Indian Institute of Surveying & Mapping or Survey Training Institute) thus raised on 6 May 1967 is now recognized as a training establishment in the field of Surveying and Cartography to impart training to the Officers and Staff of Survey of India and other Government Organisations, Private Individuals, and Scholars from other Afro-Asian countries.

== Survey Education ==
Introduction of innovative surveying systems such as the Global Positioning System, Electronic Distance Measurement, digital levels and theodolites, Laser scanners, digital sensors, high resolution satellite imageries etc., has revolutionised the scope of spatial data collection. However, on account of deficiencies in our system of Survey Education and practices, many of these technologies have yet to acquire the status of enabling technology in India.

Broadly, the ethos can be attributed to two main reasons - the Survey Education, by itself, being not popular as a discipline of science and there being no regularatory standards to control the practices of collecting spatial data. A lot of spatial data being generated by various institutions using high-end technology by untrained manpower, being inconsistent in accuracies and unrelated to any meta-data standards on account of lack of professional supervision, cannot be put to universal use in a multi-disciplinary environment.

Such efforts, although meeting a limited requirement, do not contribute to the national need of a standardised spatial data base and are often found wanting in accuracy when integrated with a regional or national perspective. For deriving full benefits and optimising the use of resources, knowledge of the fundamentals of land surveying and various methodologies of interfacing them with the new technologies has, therefore, become an inescapable requirement for all technologists and planners engaged in generation and manipulation of spatial information.

Survey Education deals with the concepts and methodologies of gathering, processing and representing geo-spatial data in a defined form and format. It encompasses education on theories and practices in disciplines of geodesy, geo-physics, photogrammetry, land surveying, cartography and reprography. With the introduction of computers and change of emphasis from analogue to digital technology and high expectations from GIS, computer sciences and various systems for generation of spatial data bases have become an integral part of survey education.

To keep pace with the present day requirement of spatial data, education on the modern tools of data gathering such as GPS, Digital Photogrammetry, laser ranging, remote sensing etc., and associated technologies in visualization of spatial data, has acquired a special place in Survey Education. Despite the sophistication in technology, need-based emphasis on accuracies, reliability and consistency in data generation remain the cardinal principle in Survey Education.

Additional Surveyor General: G. Varun Kumar

Deputy Surveyor General (Tech): D. K. Singh

Deputy Surveyor General (Adm): Pankaj Mishra
