= R. L. Holdsworth =

English scholar, academic, educationalist, cricketer and Himalayan mountaineer

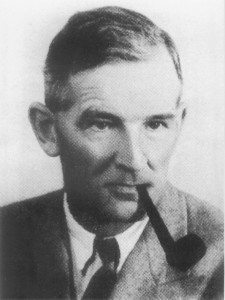
- Born: 25 February 1899; Mysore, India
- Died: 20 June 1976 (aged 77); Somerset, England
- Other name: Holdie
- Education: Magdalen College, Oxford
- Occupations: Scholar, schoolmaster, cricketer, mountaineer
- Known for: Schoolmaster at Harrow School, England; Deputy Headmaster at The Doon School, India; Principal of Islamia College University

Romilly Lisle Holdsworth, commonly known as R. L. Holdsworth, (25 February 1899 – 20 June 1976) was an English scholar, academic, educationalist, cricketer and a distinguished Himalayan mountaineer. He was a member of the first expedition to Kamet in 1931, which included other stalwarts such as Eric Shipton and Frank Smythe. Holdsworth, along with Shipton and Smythe, are credited with the discovery of the Valley of Flowers, now a UNESCO World Heritage Site, during their return from Kamet.

== Early life ==
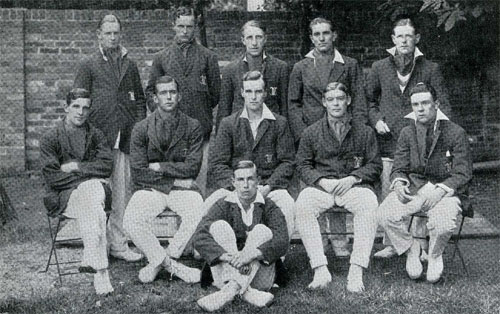
The Oxford University Cricket Team, 1922; Holdsworth sits on the chair at the left corner.

Holdsworth was educated at Repton School, where he was a pupil of Victor Gollancz, later a famous publisher. He attended Repton under the headmastership of William Temple, the future Archbishop of Canterbury. He later attended the University of Oxford, where he read Literae Humaniores or Classics at Magdalen College. At Oxford he earned a Triple Blue for cricket, football and boxing. He was a first-class batsman and played cricket for Sussex, Warwickshire and Marylebone Cricket Club.

Holdsworth briefly served in the First World War as a lieutenant in the Rifle Brigade in 1918 (he served until 1919), after leaving Repton.

== Career ==
Holdsworth held various distinguished positions in his lifetime. In 1922, he joined Harrow School as a schoolmaster. He was made the master-in-charge of cricket and played for Sussex County Cricket Club. In order to encourage ski mountaineering at Harrow, he established a club called the Marmots. After leaving Harrow in 1933, he took over as principal of Islamia College in Peshawar, Pakistan (at the time in British India), in which position he served for seven years until 1940, when he joined The Doon School in Dehradun. At Doon, he met his old colleague J. A. K. Martyn, whom he had known since his days at Harrow. Martyn was the second headmaster of Doon School.

He later retired in Somerset, England.

== Climbing highlights ==
- 1924 – Holdsworth was invited by George Mallory to join him on the 1924 British Mount Everest expedition but he was so adamant on taking his skis along that the invitation was withdrawn. Holdsworth later remarked that his "intransigence saved my life" because it was on this expedition that Mallory disappeared along with Irvine.
- 1931 – Holdsworth was a member of the first expedition to climb Kamet (7,756 m) in 1931, at the time the highest peak yet climbed. During the Kamet expedition Holdsworth, Shipton and Smythe discovered what they called the Valley of Flowers in the Himalaya, now in the state of Uttarakhand, India. Holdsworth also holds the record of smoking a pipe at the summit of Mt. Kamet.

== Cricket career ==
Holdsworth was active in first-class cricket from 1919 to 1942. He played for Warwickshire and Sussex. He appeared in 109 first-class matches as a righthanded batsman who scored 4,716 runs with a highest score of 202 among eight centuries.

== See also ==
- Role of The Doon School in Indian mountaineering
