= Second breakfast =

Meal eaten after breakfast, but before lunch

Second breakfast (German: zweites Frühstück; Polish: drugie śniadanie; Slovak: desiata; Hungarian: tízórai) is a meal eaten after breakfast, but before dinner. It is a traditional meal in Bavaria, Poland, Slovakia and Hungary. In Bavaria and Poland, special dishes are made exclusively to be eaten during second breakfast. In Vienna and most other parts of Austria the second breakfast is referred to as Jause.

== Details ==
The second breakfast is typically a lighter meal or snack eaten around 10:00 in the morning (its Hungarian and Slovak names, tízórai and desiata respectively, actually mean "[snack] at 10"). It consists of coffee and either pastries or sausages. The typical sausage is a white sausage, Weißwurst, which is considered the specialty of Munich and Bavaria in general. The sausage is prepared during the early morning to serve during the second breakfast. It is served with pretzels, sweet mustard, and wheat beer. The meal is roughly similar in concept to the British elevenses. In Poland second breakfast usually consists of snacks like sandwiches or pastries, but may consist of light dessert-type dishes like chocolate pudding or kisiel. In Hungary, second breakfast is mainly associated with schoolchildren, and typically consists of fruit, sandwiches, pastries, or granola bars.

First and second breakfast is also a common custom in some rural areas. Farmers who need to rise early to tend to animals or perform other chores may eat a small "first breakfast", such as toast and coffee, just after rising, followed by a heartier second breakfast after the first round of chores is done.

== In literature and film ==
In J. R. R. Tolkien's novel The Hobbit, the protagonist Bilbo Baggins eats a second breakfast, and in the preface to its sequel, The Lord of the Rings, Tolkien mentions that hobbits prefer to eat six meals a day. In Peter Jackson's film adaptation of The Fellowship of the Ring, as Aragorn is leading the hobbits on a march, Pippin – hoping for a meal break – is horrified when Merry tells him that the man probably does not know about second breakfast. Pippin goes on to ask if he knows about the other meals commonly eaten by hobbits, including elevenses, luncheon, afternoon tea, dinner, and supper. Aragorn throws an apple to each of the pair to tide them over until their next "regular" meal break. However, in the book, hobbits are specifically described as eating "six meals a day (when they get them)", not seven.

In Thomas Mann's books The Magic Mountain and Buddenbrooks, frequent and detailed references are made to second breakfasts. Sometimes food from the first breakfast appears again such as oatmeal and fruit. In fact, in Magic Mountain, Mann even refers to "third breakfasts". In Chapter 11 of "Mansfield Park", Jane Austen refers to second breakfast.

== See also ==
- Brunch
- Chhota haazri
- Central European cuisine
- Elevenses
- List of brunch foods
