= Virendra Prabhakar =

Indian photojournalist (1928 – 2015)

- Born: 15 August 1928; Uttar Pradesh, British Raj
- Died: 4 January 2015 (aged 86); New Delhi, India
- Occupation: Press photojournalist
- Years active: 1947–2015
- Known for: News photos
- Spouse: Kanta
- Children: Two sons and a daughter
- Awards: Padma Shri; Delhi State Award; AIFACS Kala Vibhushan Award; ABI Distinguished Leadership Award; Rotary International Man of the Year 2000; Acharya Mahapragya Ahimsa Prakshikshan Samman

Virendra Prabhakar (15 August 1928 – 4 January 2015) was an Indian press photojournalist, cited by the Limca Book of Records as the longest serving press photojournalist. 14,458 published news photos have been credited to him. The Government of India awarded him the fourth highest Indian civilian honour of Padma Shri in 1982.

== Biography ==
Virendra Prabhakar was born in the Indian state of Uttar Pradesh in a Jain family on 15 August 1928 and did his schooling at the Doon School where he had the opportunity to train in sculpture and photography under the renowned sculptor, Sudhir Khastgir who was a member of the arts faculty. Later, he did training in painting at the Chitrashala, Mussoorie. His career started with a coverage of the Asian Relations Conference hosted by the provisional government headed by Jawaharlal Nehru in 1947 as India was in the transitional stage to independence. Prabhakar covered the conference staged at the Old Fort, Delhi which was attended to by Mahatma Gandhi and former Indonesian president, Sukarno.

Prabhakar's career which returned a reported 14,458 published news photos and spanned from 1947 till his death in 2015, earned him an entry in the Limca Book of Records as the longest serving photojournalist. His photos have been published by many Hindi and English language dailies and his photo exhibitions on various themes have been staged at many places. He was the founder secretary of the Chitra Kala Sangam, an organisation based in Delhi promoting art and culture.

Prabhakar was married to Kanta and the couple lived at Bapa Nagar, Delhi. They had a daughter, Neelam and two sons, Ashok Jain and Ravi Jain, the latter a joint secretary of the Delhi District Cricket Association. Prabhakar died on 4 January 2015 at Delhi at the age of 86 succumbing to a cardiac arrest.

== Awards and honours ==
The Government of India awarded him the civilian honour of Padma Shri. in 1982. This was followed by the Delhi State Award The All India Fine Arts and Crafts Society awarded him the Millennium 2000 Kala Vibhushan Award in 2000, the same year as he received the Man of the Year award from Rotary International. In 2006, he received the Acharya Mahapragya Ahimsa Prakshikshan Samman in 2006.

== See also ==
- Photojournalism
