= UNAA =

UNAA may refer to:

== Organizations ==
- Ugandan North American Association, a community organization
- United Nations Association of Australia
