= Aishwarya Tipnis =

Indian architect

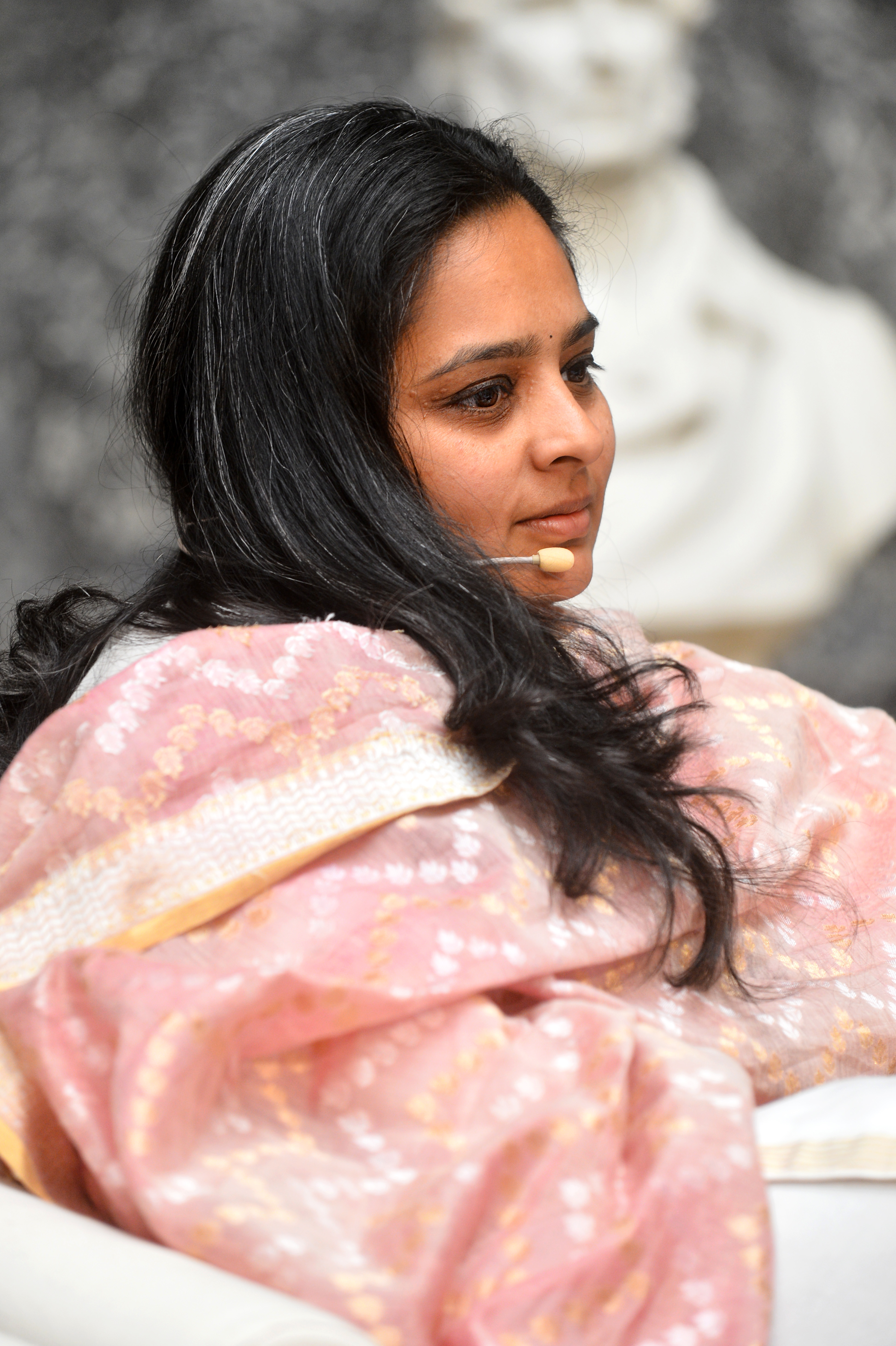
- Born: 1980 (age 45–46); New Delhi, India
- Education: School of Planning and Architecture, New Delhi
- Occupation: Architect
- Awards: Award of Merit, UNESCO Asia Pacific Heritage Awards (2016); Honourable Mention, UNESCO Asia-Pacific Awards for Cultural Heritage Conservation (2016); Chevalier de l'Ordre des Arts et des Lettres (2018); Excellence Award for Heritage Conservation Condé Nast Traveller Readers' Travel Awards 2019
- Projects: Mahidpur Fort, Madhya Pradesh; Restoration work in Chandannagar, West Bengal, Main Building, The Doon School

Aishwarya Tipnis is an Indian architect, educator and heritage conservationist, whose eponymous practice Aishwarya Tipnis Architects focuses on heritage conservation of neglected monuments and significant buildings of India. In 2015, her work on the century-old Main Building of The Doon School received the Honourable Mention under the UNESCO Asia-Pacific Awards for Cultural Heritage Conservation. In 2016, the firm's restoration work on the walls and bastions of the 18th-century Mahidpur Fort, in Madhya Pradesh, was given the Award of Merit under the UNESCO Asia Pacific Heritage Awards. In 2018, she became the youngest architect to be appointed the Chevalier de l'Ordre des Arts et des Lettres by the French government for her preservation work of French heritage in India, particularly Chandernagore in West Bengal. Tipnis was part of the UNESCO Expert Team for preparing the Comprehensive Conservation Plan for the Darjeeling Himalayan Railway, a UNESCO World Heritage Site. She has been recognised as a Global Cultural Leader by the European Union in 2016.

== Biography ==
Tipnis grew up in New Delhi and is an alumna of Birla Vidya Niketan; she studied at School of Planning and Architecture, New Delhi for her bachelor's degree. She was then awarded the Scottish International Scholarship to pursue a master's degree in European Urban Conservation at the University of Dundee, Scotland. She is recipient of the Commonwealth Professional Fellowship in 2011. Tipnis holds a PhD in Adaptive Reuse of Industrial Heritage in India from the School of Planning and Architecture New Delhi in 2022.

== Career ==
=== Professional ===
While studying at the School of Planning and Architecture, new Delhi, Tipnis interned at the Ranjit Sabikhi Architects, known for their urban design projects, education buildings, and housing communities. She later worked as an associate with noted conservation architects in India and the UK In 2007, she founded her eponymous practice Aishwarya Tipnis Architects, focusing on architectural conservation and sustainable development.

In 2016, her firm restored the hundred-year-old Main Building of The Doon School, and received the Honourable Mention under the UNESCO Asia-Pacific Awards for Cultural Heritage Conservation. In the same year, their work on the walls and bastions of Mahidpur Fort was given the Award of Merit under the UNESCO Asia Pacific Heritage Awards. For restoration efforts in Chandernagore, a former French colony in India, she was appointed the Chevalier de l'Ordre des Arts et des Lettres by the Ministry of Culture, French Government. Tipnis was part of the UNESCO Expert Team for preparing the Comprehensive Conservation Plan for the Darjeeling Himalayan Railway, a UNESCO World Heritage Site. 2019–present she has been involved with the Woodstock School Mussoorie in the development of their campus including reimagining the High School, Quad and the Parker Hall.

Aishwarya’s work was showcased as part of the 80 Women Architects in India as part of Samatva in the India's first Art Architecture and Design Biennale Delhi in 2023 .

=== Educator ===
Since January 2010, she has been a Visiting Faculty in the Department of Urban Design at her alma mater, School of Planning and Architecture, New Delhi. and has also lectured at leading universities including CEPT University, Sir J.J. College of Architecture in India as well as at the Reinwardt Academy, University of Amsterdam, Netherlands Auckland University of Technology, New Zealand and University of Dundee Scotland, UK and University of Edinburgh Scotland.

She has been appointed as an expert member on the Academic Council of Kamla Raheja Vidyanidhi Institute for Architecture & Environmental Studies Mumbai India in 2024. She also serves on the Board of Review of CEPT University, Ahemdabad since 2024.

== Social design and activism ==
Her work has involved students and youth in most of the projects. The Haveli Project was the first to allow students to come and learn from the ongoing restoration work through the Lime Workshop. Community engagement workshops were conducted as part of the Dutch in Chinsurah and Heritage & People of Chandernagore project. As part of Bonjour India 2018, a 7-day co-creation workshop with multi-disciplinary students from India and France was conducted at Chandernagore.

Aishwarya co-founded Jugaadopolis a platform that brings together students and community through innovative workshops to explore the tangible and intangible heritage of India. She has advocated the use of open-source digital technologies for making heritage conservation accessible to all through her projects.

In January 2024, Aishwarya Tipnis was nominated as an expert member on the Heritage Conservation Committee of Delhi by the Ministry of Housing and Urban Affairs Government of India.

=== The Restoration Toolbox ===
Aishwarya has spearheaded a project The Restoration Toolbox which is an open source digital platform that empowers communities in restoring their own heritage. The project has been selected as the 8 most innovative ideas for international cultural relations by EUNIC Global under the Spaces of Culture programme for 2023. The project has been recognised as a unique bottom up initiative that is unique in its conception and demystifies the process of heritage conservation for everyday heritage. As part of the project several workshops were conducted with stakeholders in public policy, community enthusiasts as well as students.

=== Restoration Clinic ===
In the mission to make heritage advice accessible to owners of everyday heritage, Aishwarya and her team have launched the Restoration Clinic to guide and empower heritage owners in the process of repair and restoration. They have successfully mentored several students while assisting in the restoration of Verdun House at Mussoorie.

== Awards ==
- Award of Merit, UNESCO Asia-Pacific Awards for Cultural Heritage Conservation (2016) - Mahidpur Fort
- Honourable Mention, UNESCO Asia-Pacific Awards for Cultural Heritage Conservation (2016) - Main Building, The Doon School
- Chevalier de l'Ordre des Arts et des Lettres (2018) - Chandannagar restoration
- Excellence Award for Heritage Conservation-Conde Nast Readers Traveller Awards (2019)

== Bibliography ==
- Tipnis, Aishwarya (2012). Vernacular Traditions: Contemporary Architecture. The Energy and Resources Institute. ISBN 978-8179934579.
- Tipnis Aishwarya (2020) Engagements in the Courtyard, Restoring a Haveli in Old Delhi, Reinwardt Academie, Amsterdam University of the Arts
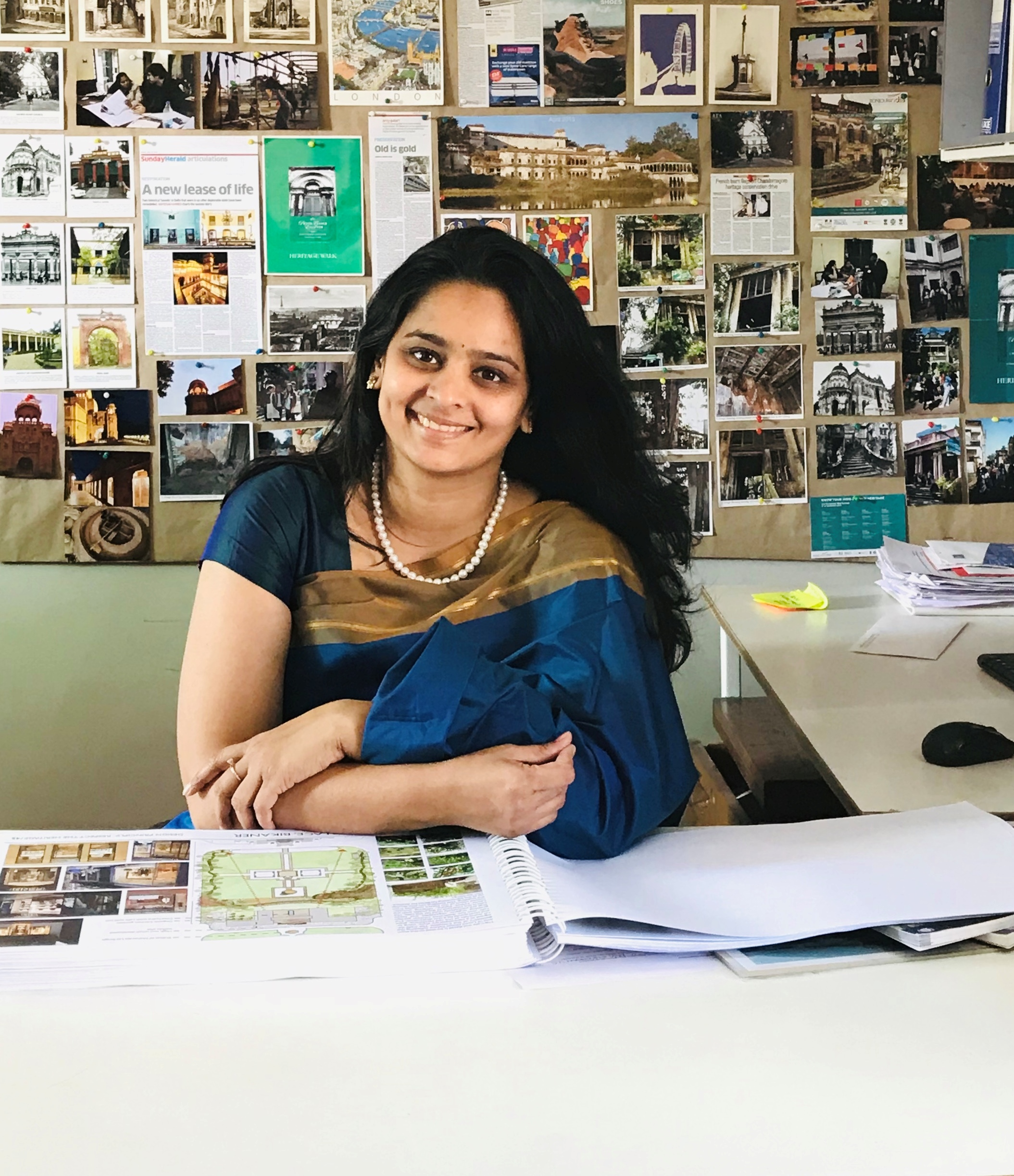
