= Lab Pe Aati Hai Dua =

Urdu poem by Allama Muhammad Iqbal

Lab Pe Aati Hai Dua (Urdu: لب پہ آتی ہے دعا, lit. 'My desire becomes a prayer on my lips'), also known as Bachche Ki Dua (Urdu: بچّے کی دعا, lit. 'A child's prayer'), is a duʿā or prayer, in Urdu verse written by Muhammad Iqbal in 1902. The dua is recited in morning school assemblies almost universally in Pakistan, and in Urdu-medium schools in India as well.

The song has long been sung in the private The Doon School in Dehradun, India, in a secular morning assembly ritual. The Imam of the Jama Masjid, Delhi, Muhibullah Nadwi, recited it as a boy in an English-medium primary school in India in the 1940s. Even earlier, the prayer was broadcast by All India Radio, Lucknow, a few months after Iqbal's death in 1938. The prayer has also been interpreted by an all-women's American bluegrass music band, Della Mae, which toured Islamabad and Lahore in Pakistan in 2012.

In October 2019, a headmaster of a government-run primary school in Pilibhit, Uttar Pradesh, India, was suspended by the district education authorities following complaints by two Hindu nationalist organizations (Vishwa Hindu Parishad and Bajrang Dal) that the song, which was being recited in the school's morning assembly, was [sic] a "madrasa prayer." Ali was later reinstated but transferred to another school.

== Lyrics ==
Urdu	Roman Urdu	English Translation
لَب پِہ آتی ہَے دُعا بَن کے تَمَنّا مِری زِنْدَگی شَمْع کی صُورَت ہو خُدايا مِری	labb pe aati hai dua ban ke tamanna meri zindagi shamma ki suurat ho Khudaaya meri	My longing comes to my lips as a supplication of mine Oh God! May like a shining candle be the life of mine
دُور دُنِيا کا مِرے دَم سے اَنْدھيرا ہو جائے ہَر جَگَہ مِرے چَمَکنے سے اُجالا ہو جائے	duur duniya ka mere damm se andhera ho jaye har jagah mere chamakne se ujaala ho jaye	May the darkness of this world disappear through this life of mine May every place light up with the sparkling light of mine
ہو مِرے دَم سے يُوں ہی مِرے وَطَن کی زِينَت جِس طَرَح پُھول سے ہُوتی ہَے چَمَن کی زِينَت	ho mere damm se yunhi mere vatan ki zeenat jiss tarha phuul se hoti hai chaman ki zeenat	May my homeland, through me, attain elegance Just as the garden, through flowers, attains elegance
زِنْدَگی ہو مِری پَرْوانے کی صُورَت، يا رَب عِلْم کی شَمْع سے ہو مُجھ کو مُحَبَّت، يا رب	zindagi ho meri parwane ki suurat, ya Rabb ilm ki shamma se ho mujh ko muhabbat, ya Rabb	May my life be like that of the moth, Oh Lord May my love be for the beacon of knowledge, Oh Lord
ہو مِرا کام غَرِيبوں کی حِمايَت کَرنا دَرْدْ مَنْدوں سے ضَعِيفوں سے مُحَبَّت کَرنا	ho mera kaam ģareebon ki himaayat karna dardmandon se za'eefon se muhabbat karna	May my life's way be to support the needy And to love the old and the grief-stricken
مِرے اللہ! بُرائی سے بَچانا مُجھ کو نيک جو راہ ہو، اُس رَہ پِہ چَلانا مُجھ کو	mere Allah! buraai se bachaana mujhko nek jo ra'ah ho, us reh pe chalaana mujhko	My God! Protect me from the evil ways Walk me through the path that leads to virtue
