= United Israel Model United Nations =

United Israel- Model United Nations Society
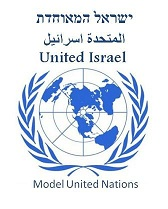
- Formation: 2010
- Type: Model United Nations Society
- Location: Israel
- President: Jonnie Schnytzer
- Affiliations: Model United Nations

United Israel- Model United Nations Society (Hebrew: "ישראל המאוחדת") is the umbrella organization for all the Model United Nations societies in Israel. United Israel is the arbitrating body for issues relevant to some of the Israeli MUN societies.

== Introduction ==
It is the official union of most of the Model United Nations societies in Israel, working under ISRAMUN organization, and incorporating societies from six academic institutes in Israel: Hebrew University of Jerusalem, University of Haifa, Bar-Ilan University, Interdisciplinary Center, The College of Management Academic Studies and Al-Qassami College. United Israel works under the United Israel Charter, written and signed by the founding members of the society.

== Goal ==
United Israel’s goal is to be an internationally oriented, student-led organization that focuses on the world of diplomacy. It aims to combine an extracurricular academic activity, with Arab-Israeli co-existence and Israeli advocacy (“Hasbara”). It strive to expose the Israeli student to international relations and international law, in order to develop the next generation of diplomats.

== Structure ==
United Israel is composed of the managing board, and the chairmen of each MUN society.

The managing board includes:

- President - Jonnie Schnytzer.
- Executive Vice President - Regina Chervinsky.
- Vice President for External Relations - Michael Teplitsky.
- Vice President for Training - Daniel Gindis.

== Academic Achievements ==
In the last two years, delegations of United Israel have participated in three important international MUN conferences:

- OxIMUN 2010- held in Oxford, England- 500 students from 63 countries: A delegation of 10 students, 2 of them received "The Best Delegate" awards for their performance.
- EuroMUN 2011- held in Maastricht, Netherlands- 590 students from 58 countries: A delegation of 22 students, 5 of them received the "Best Delegate" awards and one "Outstanding Delegate" award (out of 26 total awards).
- McMUN 2011- held in Montreal, Quebec, Canada- 1,400 students from 78 countries: A delegation of 2 students, one of them received The "Best Delegate" award.

== Public diplomacy ==
Apart from the academic work, the United Israel and its societies are also engaged with the informal Israeli Public Diplomacy ("Hasbara").

In The EuroMUN 2011, held in Maastricht, the delegation met the Honorary Consul of Israel to the Limburg region, and received media coverage by newspapers and websites, that told the story of the Israeli delegation that presented a blend of Jews, Muslims and Christians.

In The OxIMUN 2010 conference, held in Oxford, the students faced and responded to serious criticism towards Israel and its policies.

Delegations from universities across the globe were also in attendance, allowing the Israeli students to engage in an open dialogue with students from nations such as- Pakistan, Lebanon, Saudi Arabia, etc.

== Future activities ==
United Israel is planned to continue, and to further expand its activities in the following year:

- Sending delegations from all institutions to around 5 international conferences around the world.
- Each society is programmed to recruit more students and to broaden its activities.
- The society plans to organize several national conferences a year. The first conference will be held hosted by The University of Haifa Model United Nations Society, and the following one by the Hebrew University.
- Establishing societies in other academic institutions, such as- Max Stern Academic College of Emek Yezreel and Ben-Gurion University of the Negev.

== See also ==
- Model United Nations
