= Global Classrooms =

- Type: Non-Profit
- Founded: 1999
- Headquarters: New York City, United States
- Field: Education
- Purpose: Bridging the Education Gap and Creating Global Citizens
- Motto: Learn. Live. Lead.
- Website: www.unanca.org/our-work/programs/global-classrooms

Global Classrooms is a U.S.-based global education program, belonging to the United Nations Association of the United States of America (UNA-USA), that engages middle school and high school students in an exploration of current world issues through Model United Nations, wherein students step into shoes of UN Ambassadors and debate a range of issues on the UN agenda. Global Classrooms was created primarily for students in economically disadvantaged public schools who have little or no knowledge of global affairs or experience with Model UN

The Global Classrooms program is currently in 24 major cities around the world. Global Classrooms bridges the gap in the Model UN community between established global education programs and traditionally underserved public schools by exposing students to the growing influence of globalization.

== Background ==
Early in the 1990s UNA-USA observed that Model UN activities overwhelmingly attracted the participation of students and teachers from private and/or affluent suburban schools. Believing it to be of critical importance, UNA-USA determined that it would increase the number of students from economically disadvantaged public schools participating in Model UN. Global Classrooms was founded in 1999, as a vehicle for education to reach students who would otherwise never have the opportunity to participate in Model UN. It has been estimated that Annually, over 300,000 high school and university students worldwide participate in Model United Nations activities.

== Program Support ==
Numerous organizations and high-profile individuals have supported the Global Classrooms program. On May 13, 2010, MTV Networks International President, MTV Staying Alive Chairman, and UNAIDS Ambassador Bill Roedy addressed the Global Classrooms international student delegation at the UN General Assembly, during which he discussed issues ranging from AIDS and HIV to global media.

Past Global Classrooms conferences have hosted speakers and guests such as: Secretary of State Hillary Clinton, Esther Brimmer, Assistant Secretary of State for International Organization Affairs, Ambassador Frederick "Rick" Barton, U.S. Permanent Representative to the United Nations Economic and Social Council, former Minister of Foreign Affairs of the Kingdom of Thailand, Kantathi Suphamongkhon and on multiple occasions, the United Nations Secretary-General Ban Ki-moon.

The United States Department of State is a major supporter of Global Classrooms and Model UN and annually offers its headquarters as the conference venue for the Global Classrooms DC conference. In addition to its ties to the diplomatic community, Global Classrooms continues to benefit from school based partnerships with school districts and universities such as: Chicago Public Schools, Kyung Hee University, Lebanese American University, and the Mulberry School for Girls.
