= Model United Nations =

Educational simulation of the UN

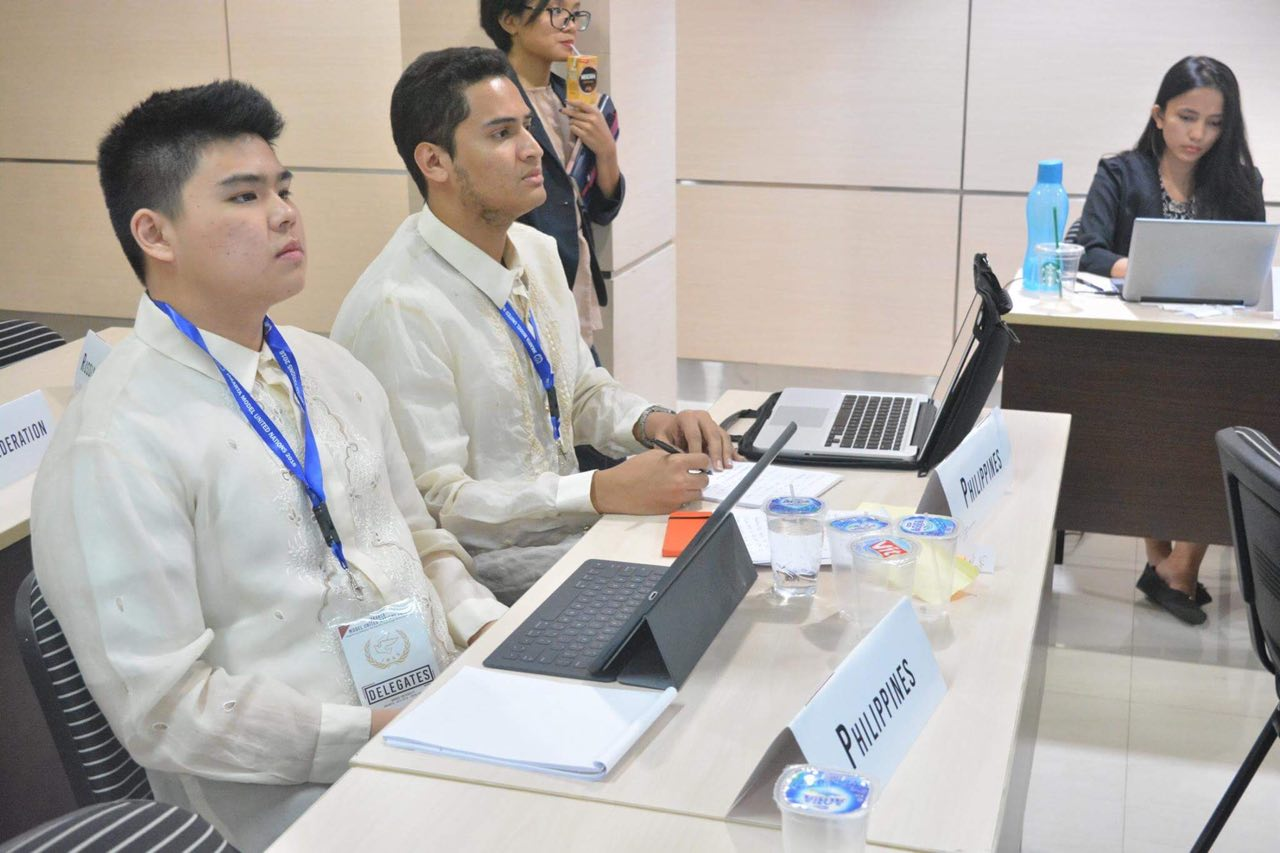
Delegates at MUN committee in Jakarta, Indonesia

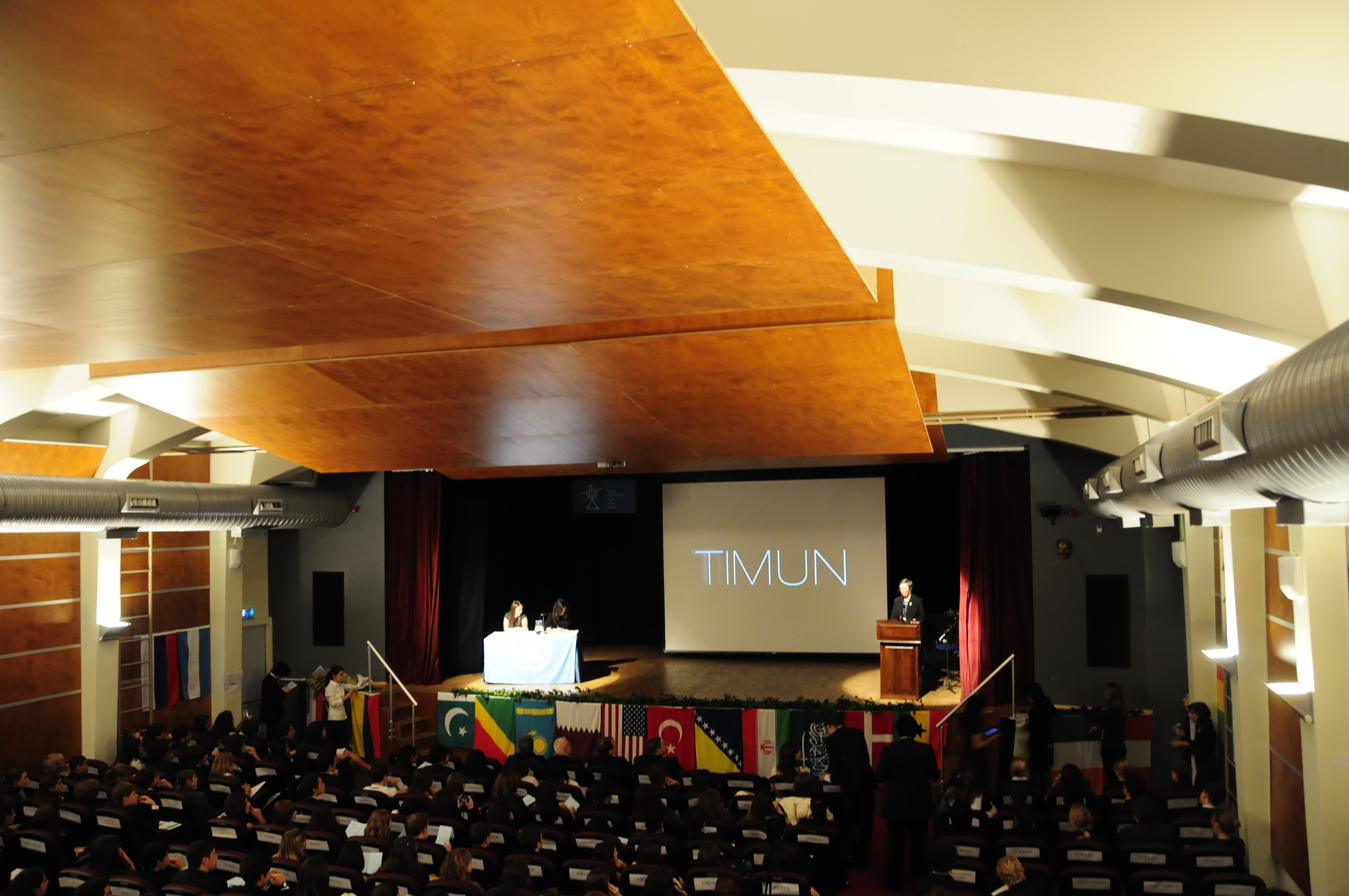
Conference assembly at the Turkish International Model United Nations in Istanbul, Turkey

Model United Nations (MUN), also known as Model UN, is an academic activity consisting of an educational simulation of the United Nations (UN). Participating students represent a country or organization or analyze and check diplomatic and international relations. During a conference, participants (referred to as "delegates") work together to make decisions on global issues.

MUN delegates may engage in research, public speaking, debating, arguing, and writing during preparation for conferences. While MUN is offered as a recreational extracurricular activity, some schools include it in their class curriculum. Organizers often state that the objectives of model UN includes building awareness of global issues and encouraging civic participation.

Student delegates prepare for conferences by conducting research, drafting position papers, and developing policy proposals. The documents are discussed and amended during sessions, then lead to the creation of written policies—often called "resolution papers"—which are voted on. Depending on the conference, awards may sometimes be given based on committee performance criteria. Students commonly attend the conferences as part of a delegation from their school or university, but some participate independently as “individual delegates”.

== History ==
Model United Nations began as a series of League of Nations simulations. The first simulation was held at the University of Oxford in November 1921.

In 1922, Mir Mahmood, the president of the Oxford International Assembly, visited Harvard University and inspired the establishment of the first American International Assembly on January 10, 1923. The Harvard event included fifteen nations and debated issues such as the status of the island of Rhodes and the international opium trade.

Following World War II and the founding of the United Nations in 1945, the simulation of the United Nations replaced the simulation of the League of Nations. The first recorded conference named "model United Nations" took place at Swarthmore College on April 5, 1947. At the event, more than 150 students from 41 colleges simulated a UN General Assembly, discussing topics like atomic-energy control, disarmament, refugee citizenship, and the reconstruction of devastated areas.

Another early MUN event was held at St. Lawrence University from February 11 to 13, 1949, organized by Dr. Harry Reiff and Otto L. George. Delegates represented regional colleges, including Adelphi University, Alfred University, Champlain College, Clarkson University, McGill University, Middlebury College, Potsdam College, Saint Michael's College, and the University of Vermont. The conference continued annually for years, and has since been revived on campus.

Three of the oldest active conferences in the world were established in the early 1950s. They are the Berkeley Model United Nations (BMUN) at Berkeley (1952), the Harvard Model United Nations (HMUN) at Harvard (1953), and model United Nations of the Far West (MUNFW), which has held college-level conferences since 1951. The first was held at Stanford University, where diplomat Ralph Bunche spoke.

== Academic aspects ==
The main objectives of participating in model UN are to develop skills in negotiation, speaking, and communication. Material issues of diplomacy and policy are approached through a quasi-academic process. Crisis committees involve rapid response to evolving crisis scenarios, which require participants to make quick decisions. In preparation for a conference, topics are chosen for each committee. Typically, research and background guides are made available by the organizers of a conference. Based on these guides, delegates of each committee are often expected to research and formulate a position for the country or group they represent and submit a position paper. Position papers outline each delegate’s stance on the topic and summarize relevant research.

== Procedures ==
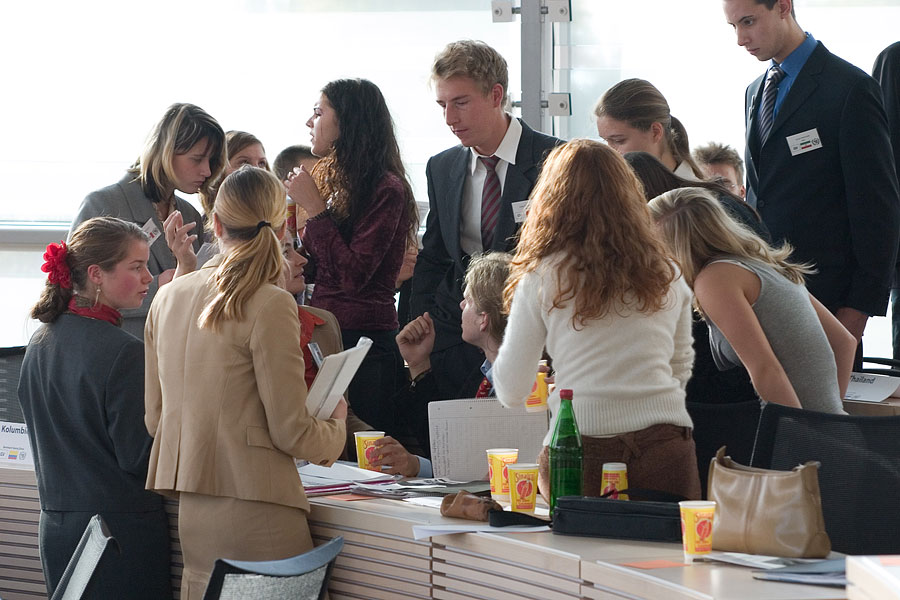
Delegates negotiating during an unmoderated caucus in Kiel, Germany

Model UN committees often use parliamentary procedures derived from Robert's Rules of Order. In addition, the United Nations has contributed to the development of model UN rules of procedure that are more influenced by those used by the actual UN. Since there is no governing body for model UN, each conference differs in their rules of procedure; conferences affiliated with the same format (like a shared rule set) often use similar procedures.

The following rules of procedure apply to general MUNs, but may not apply to every MUN:

=== Points and motions ===
Points and motions outline how topics are prioritized, how resolutions are voted on, and how the general flow of debate is facilitated. Points are used to discuss topics that are outside of substantive debate. They are more personal and do not require a vote. There are several types of points, including a point of information (POI), which is a question asked of a speaker after their speech; a point of order; a point of parliamentary inquiry; and a point of personal privilege.

Motions are used to discuss procedural matters, and they help to further the discussion on a committee topic. A delegate may request the committee as a whole to perform a particular action, such as moving to a voting procedure. If a motion is objected to, it may not be entertained at the discretion of the chair. Most motions will require a vote in order to pass; the number of votes required to pass these motions works according to a quorum – this is the minimum number of delegates required to make decisions in a committee. The motions used at any given time in a model UN committee change, according to where the committee is in the flow of debate.

=== Flow of debate ===
Most MUN committees follow a structured flow of debate, typically starting with a speakers list, followed by formal or informal debate, and concluding with voting procedures. A dais (the group of people in charge of each committee during a model UN conference) will maintain a list of speakers, and the delegates follow the order written on the 'speaker list'. Delegates may be added to the speaker list by raising their placards or sending a note to the chair. During this time, delegates talk to the entire committee. They make speeches, answer questions, and debate on resolutions and amendments. If there are no other motions, the committee goes back to the speaker list by default.

Formal/informal debate can include both moderated and unmoderated caucuses. A caucus is an opportunity to discuss policy ideas. A moderated caucus is more formal and is run by the committee chair; an unmoderated caucus is a time when delegates move around the room and hold a more informal discussion on the topic. In both moderated and unmoderated caucuses, the committee enters a recess and suspends its formal rules of procedure. During a moderated caucus, delegates may speak once recognized by the chair, and speeches are typically limited to a shorter duration. Entering a moderated caucus requires a motion followed by a vote. In contrast, an unmoderated caucus allows delegates to engage in informal discussions with other delegates and staff without needing recognition from the chair.

=== Resolutions ===
A resolution is a legal document that expresses the general opinion of the committee. Once passed, it outlines the actions that the committee recommends.

Resolutions are the written compilation of the ideas discussed during debate. They are considered the final results of conversations, writings, and negotiations. Resolutions must go through a draft, approval by the dais, and consequent debate and modification.

MUN Resolutions are composed of both preambulatory and operative clauses. Preambulatory clauses outline the problems addressed by the resolution, and are typically not debated, while operative clauses propose solutions and present them in a structured and organized manner.

== Conference management ==
MUN societies and conferences are run by a group of administrators known as the secretariat. A secretariat is headed by a Secretary-General. Other members of the secretariat could include the Director-General, Under-Secretaries-General and President of General Assembly.

=== Committee dais ===
Each committee usually has a dais that is composed of a chair (also known as moderator or director), one or more vice-chairs and a team of note-passers (also known as pages, runners, security, admins, or similar).

In crisis committees, there can also be a crisis staff composed of a crisis director, assistant director, and crisis staffers. These members are responsible for facilitating the back-room portion of a committee.

== Languages ==
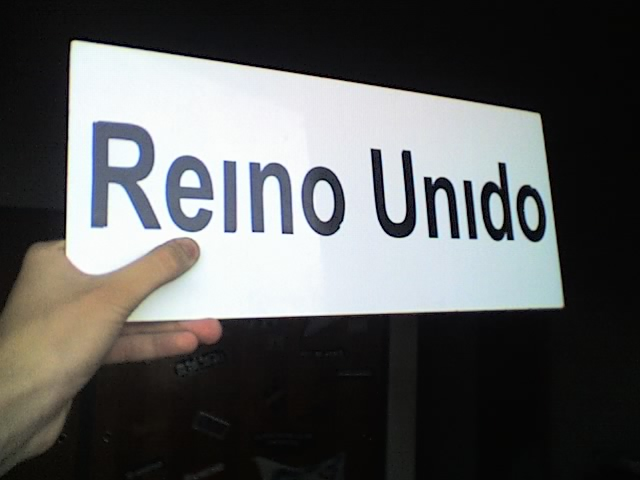
Placard for the United Kingdom in Spanish at the International Model United Nations of Buenos Aires (MINUBA) in Argentina

Traditionally, English has been the official working language of most conferences. However, as model UN has become more popular around the world, and as conferences in countries such as the United States have sought to appeal to underrepresented minorities (such as the Spanish-speaking community), committees using languages other than English, or which are bilingual, have become common. However, this is still not a mainstream phenomenon, especially in the United States, where most bilingual or Spanish language committees are found only at conferences hosted in Puerto Rico or the Southwest.

== Attire ==
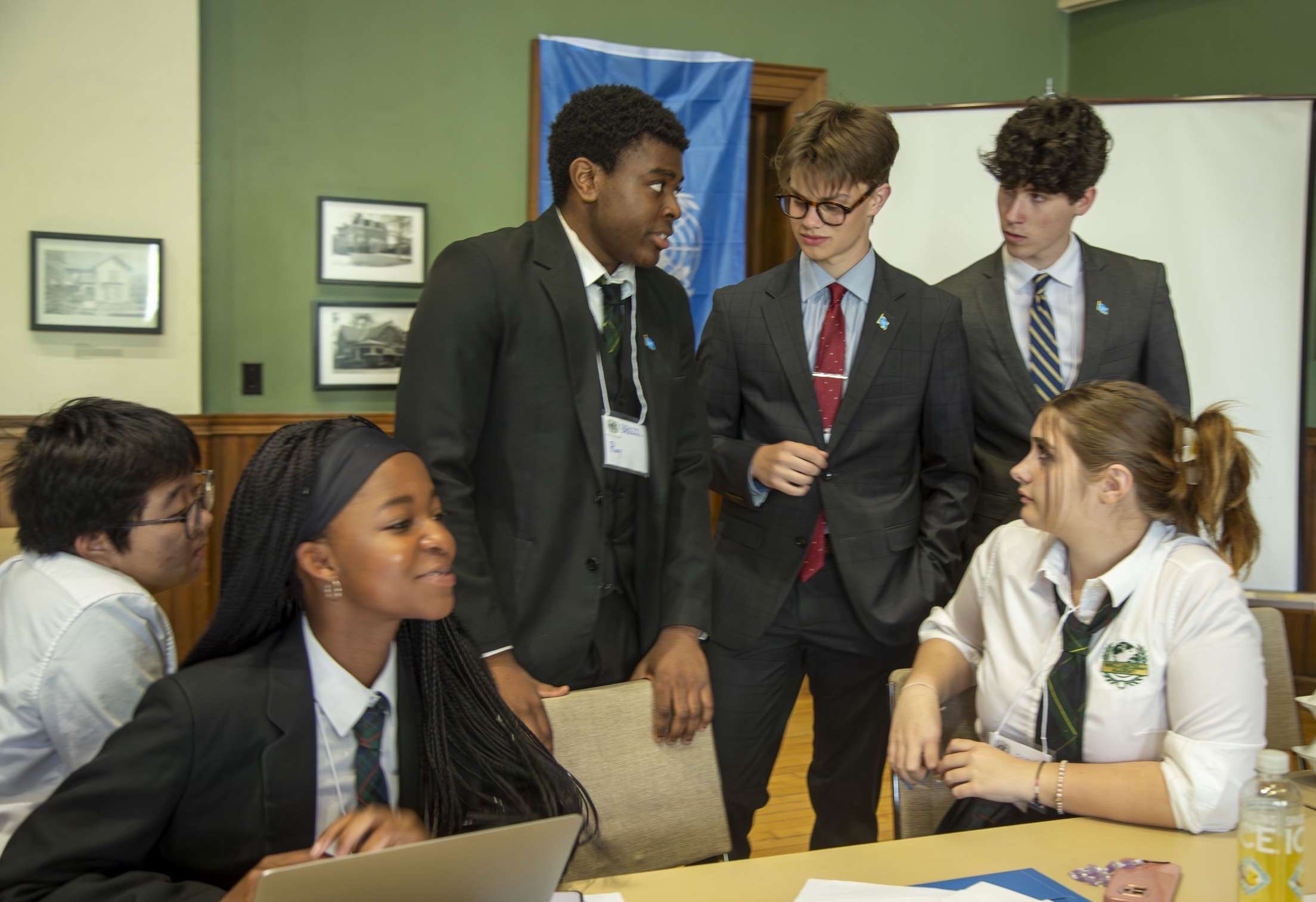
MUN Conference circa 2022, Toronto, Canada.

Nearly all model United Nations conferences require delegates to wear Western business attire. Casual wear, as well as clothing that would be excessively revealing, is prohibited, alongside the display of any school or national symbols aside from those of the UN during the competition. The permissibility of cultural attire varies. While the wearing of traditional attire is permitted in National Model United Nations in cases where it would also be professional, delegates are not allowed to "attempt to portray a character using traditional cultural attire as a costume."

== Committees ==
Model United Nations conferences regularly simulate the bodies of the United Nations, the European Union, government cabinets, regional bodies such as ASEAN, PNA, as well as corporate boards, NGOs or so-called Press Corps. Idiosyncrasies and fictional committees also exist. Some examples for fantasy and fictional committees include Ministry of Magic and Lord of the Rings. An example for such a special committee that does not have a parallel in the actual United Nations which deals with a crisis is known as a 'crisis committee.' In this committee, a crisis is given to a team of students and the teams must come up with solutions. Crisis committees traditionally focus on a single historical event, but recently, current and future events have been used as well. The event may be fictional or non-fictional.

=== Crisis committees ===
Crisis is a specialized form of model UN where participants emulate a variety of entities, from a board of directors to historical figures. Crisis committees tend to be much smaller in size than their classic counterparts, and revolve around a quickly developing series of events known as a "crisis." Delegates are assigned positions, and must create directives consisting purely of operative actions. This means that rather than solving problems with resolutions, delegates pass directives. While delegates are working to solve the crisis at hand through directives, they are also often tasked with individual objectives that can be achieved with the submission of crisis notes. Delegates may sometimes find out what other committee members have been doing through crisis updates.

Unlike regular committees, crisis committees have two distinct forums: the in-room and the out-room (also known as the front-room and the back-room, respectively). The in-room consists of delegate activity in the committee, including the usual speaking, while the out-room refers to directives sent to staffers (also known as directors or backrooms), communication with other crisis committees. Directives can either be written by an individual, several individuals working together, or the whole committee.

Staffers can update crisis events based partly on a preset direction and partly on interaction from delegates and committees. Crisis committees are also subject to more variation in rules and experimentation than regular committees. One relatively common variant is the "midnight crisis," where delegates attend a committee session at night to respond to an emergency situation. There also may be crisis committees that interact with each other, where resolutions that are written impact debate in other committees.

== Organization ==
Model United Nations conferences are usually organized by high school or college clubs. Some other model united nations conferences are organized by a group of youth, and not affiliated with any educational institutions, such as National Model UN.

== Model UN by region and country ==
Model United Nations originated in the United States, but it has since spread across the globe. Because Model UN is decentralized and has grown autonomously around the world, there are significant differences in how MUN is done between regions.

=== Africa ===
==== Botswana ====
The majority of MUN conferences held in Botswana are centered around the capital city, Gaborone. Model United Nations events have also happened online, with Youth International Conclave hosting an event to encourage more of the youth to take part.

==== Mauritius ====
The Zonal and National MUN conferences have been held in Mauritius since 1994 under the aegis of the Ministry of Education. Since 2025, the WMUN club from private school Westcoast International Secondary School has launched the annual WMUN conference in-line with their international experiences. Other high school and university level conferences are organised by schools such as Collège du Saint-Esprit, Mahatma Gandhi Institute or the University of Mauritius.

==== Nigeria ====
Lagos Model United Nations is one of Africa's pioneer MUN Conferences. Set in Lagos, it is the largest MUN conference in West Africa and attracts over 400 delegates each year. The conference is hosted by the Faculty of Law, University of Lagos, and simulates up to 10 committees of the United Nations annually. The conference began in 2016, due to the desire of the founders to organize a conference in Nigeria, after participating in several model United Nations conferences worldwide, including National Model United Nations and Rome Model United Nations.

Beyond the simulation of committees, the Conference offers other activities for delegates such as the Sustainable Development Goals (SDG) Workshop and the Idea Fair. The SDG Workshop is promoted as a platform for SDG experts to share their experiences with the delegates, while the Idea Fair is an opportunity for young innovators working on different SDGs to win a cash grant.

==== Other countries ====
Other conferences in Africa include NAIMUN in Marrakesh, Morocco. Established in August 2012 by a coalition of North African youths, NAIMUN is the largest student-run Model United Nations conference in Africa and the Middle East, with 4 sub-branches in Morocco, Tunisia, Algeria and Egypt.

=== Asia-Pacific ===
==== Afghanistan ====
The Kabul Model United Nations was established in Kabul in 2012 The objectives are to bring young individuals together to discuss global issues and promote diplomacy, human rights, peacebuilding, and social welfare. Participants include university students up to the age of 30. They come from four or five provinces in Afghanistan to develop critical thinking and public speaking skills.

==== Australia ====
Model United Nations conferences in Australia are typically separated into or by the many branches of Rotary Australia. Many events are hosted by UN Youth Australia including state and national conference alongside the Evatt Competition, the largest MUN competition in the country. Harvard and Yale both host conferences annually in Australia alongside domestic universities the University of Sydney and the Australian National University. High schools in Australia also host conferences, the largest of which being hosted by Knox Grammar School with over 470 delegates rendering it the largest conference in the country across tertiary and high school levels.

==== Bahrain ====
The Bahrain Universities Model United Nations occurs yearly. It draws more than 200 delegates from local universities and from across the Middle East.

==== Bangladesh ====
Model United Nations has been practiced in Bangladesh since 2002, when the Model United Nations on Combating Terrorism – Bangladesh Model United Nations first took place. Since then, plenty of Model United Nations conferences have been held in the country. Model United Nations became a popular simulation in Bangladesh around 2013.

MUN in Bangladesh grew rapidly after the formation of the first university-based MUN club of the country, Dhaka University Model United Nations Association, in 2011. Dhaka University National Model United Nations (DUNMUN) started in 2012.

==== China ====
Model United Nations first came to mainland China in 1995, when the China Foreign Affairs University held the country's first collegiate model United Nations conferences. Model UN arrived in mainland Chinese high schools in 2005, and it expanded rapidly. Peking University (PKU) students, after attending Harvard's HMUN, organized the first national model UN conference for high school students in mainland China.

Between 2005 and 2010, national Model United Nations conferences such as those organized by PKU and the rival Fudan University in Shanghai drew high school students from around the country, who competed for limited spaces. Over time, lesser-known national conferences, as well as regional and even local conferences for high school students, began to develop and gradually spread to cities beyond Beijing and Shanghai.

Most Model United Nations conferences in mainland China are organized through private or academic enterprises; however, some government-affiliated MUNs have also flourished, and recently, unofficial student-run grassroots conferences have begun to dominate the Chinese MUN scene.

==== Hong Kong ====
The Hong Kong Model United Nations was founded in 1989 and held at the Hong Kong City Hall. It is Asia's oldest continuously-run Model United Nations conference. Since 2015, HKMUN has been held at Hong Kong Science & Technology Park.

==== India ====
Delegates from across India attend the Doon School Model United Nations. The Harvard MUN India hosted over 1700 attendees in 2019. Delegates also participate in the I.I.M.U.N. There are also various local model United Nations hosted by regional schools.

==== Israel ====
The first MUN conference in Israel was The Israel Middle East Model United Nations (TIMEMUN), held at Walworth Barbour American International School in 2000. Since then, many more high school conferences have opened throughout Israel. In 2008, Reichman University established the first United Nations Model Club at the academic level in Israel. Since then, university-level MUN in Israel has grown to include over 10 universities and colleges and is led by the Israeli Model United Nations Association. Some universities hold a yearly conference of their own, such as Tel Aviv University's TLVMUN. United Israel Model United Nations was responsible for a number of national conferences (IsraMUN) and support for international delegations.

==== Japan ====
MUN for Japan began in 1983, when All Japan Model United Nations was established under the leadership of Sadako Ogata.

In 2010, the Japan University English Model United Nations (JUEMUN) was established by Lori Zenuk-Nishide and Donna Tatsuki of Kobe City University of Foreign Studies and Craig Smith of Kyoto University of Foreign Studies as an experiential learning project focused on developing students’ English-language skills and knowledge of international relations. JUEMUN subsequently expanded to include universities throughout Japan, overseas universities, and international students studying in Japan. (JPN Univ English MUN)

==== Kuwait ====
The American Creative Academy Model United Nations (ACAMUN), the American School of Kuwait Model United Nations (ASKMUN), and the Bayan Bilingual School Model United Nations (BBSMUN) are the most popular Model United Nations organizations in the state of Kuwait for high school students. Similarly, the American University of Kuwait Model United Nations (AUKMUN) is considered to be the leading Model United Nations organization for university and collegiate students, with AUKMUN being recognized by the United Nations in Kuwait.

==== New Zealand ====
A high number of high schools in New Zealand operate their own MUN events, with UN Youth New Zealand functioning as a managing organization. UN Youth NZ also organizes regional and national events, along with Aotearoa Youth Declaration, the Pacific Project, and New Zealand's THIMUN delegation.

==== Oman ====
In Oman, a variety of Model United Nations (MUN) conferences are organized annually, both in online and offline formats, providing students with numerous opportunities to engage in debating, diplomacy, and international relations. Among these, the Sultans School Model United Nations (TSSMUN) and the Indian School Muscat Model United Nations (ISMMUN), which holds particular significance as the largest school-run MUN conference in the Gulf region.

==== Pakistan ====
The first MUN in Pakistan was held in 2006 and since then, the number of MUN conferences in the country has grown, attracting participants from schools, colleges, and universities across the country. Some well-established MUNs in Pakistan include the Aitchison College Model United Nations (ACMUN), Youth International Conclave Model United Nations, and Karachi Grammar School Model United Nations (KGSMUN). The Aitchison College Model United Nations Society was established in 2009. They have won the overall Best Delegation at HMUN China for two years in a row, and for a record third time.

Another major conference in Pakistan is the "Lahore University of Management Sciences Model United Nations" in Lahore, Pakistan which hosts more than 400 delegates.

==== United Arab Emirates ====
The United Arab Emirates Universities Model United Nations occurs yearly. It draws more than 300 delegates from local universities and from across the Middle East. Many schools also have their own MUN conferences, including DIAMUN at Dubai International Academy, ADISMUN at Al Durrah International School, RSSMUN at Al Rashid Al Saleh Private School, NMSMUN at GEMS New Millennium School and GFSMUN at GEMS Founders School Dubai.

Dubai International Academy Model United Nations is the largest student led Model United Nations conference in the MENA region, hosting more than 700 delegates from across the world at its annual conference.

==== Vietnam ====
There has been an increasing number of conferences, including invitational ones such as UNISMUN, SAMSUN, and many other non-invitational ones. These conferences are often organized by schools or student-led organizations with varying scales and exclusivity. One of the most inclusive Model United Nations conferences in the country is the Vietnam National Model United Nations (VNMUN), open to not only Vietnamese in all parts of the country but also international students studying around the world.

=== Europe ===
==== Denmark ====
MUN is relatively popular in Denmark, with BIGMUN being the largest conference in Scandinavia.

==== Germany ====
MUN is popular amongst university and high school students in Germany. Examples include the Model United Nations of Munich (MunoM) since 2004 and the country's largest conference, Oldenburg Model United Nations (OLMUN). Most model United Nations Conferences in Germany debate in English. Exceptions to that are high school conferences including the ones organized by (DMUN e.V.) in Stuttgart (MUNBW), Kiel (MUNSH), and Potsdam (MUNBB), as well as the ones organized by (SvEN, Simulation Vereinte Nationen). At the college level, BIMUN/SINUB in Bonn takes place as a multi-lingual conference with live interpretation. The Technical University of Munich's MUNTUM e.V., alongside MUNAM e.V. from LMU Munich, organizes IsarMUN, a large annual conference targeted towards University and high-school students across the world.

Every year, usually at the end of February, the MUN conference BayernMUN (Engl. BavariaMUN) takes place at the Nuremberg Castle in Nuremberg. Organised by the United Nations Society Nuremberg (UNSN) e. V., BayernMUN welcomes about 150 to 200 pupils and students not only from Bavaria and Germany, but even from abroad, including students from overseas universities.

==== Ireland ====
MUN is very popular in Ireland, mainly among secondary school students. Most conferences are hosted by schools in Dublin and its surrounding counties. There are two international Conferences in Ireland, Saint Andrew’s International MUN (SAIMUN) and Wesley College Dublin MUN (WCDMUN).SAIMUN takes place in mid February while WCDMUN is in March. Irish schools also attend the Royal Russell International MUN (RRSIMUN) in Croydon, and Saint Andrew’s is the only Irish school that attends The Hague International MUN (THIMUN).

Ireland follows a more localised MUN structure focused on the debate of resolutions rather than the drafting or creation of them. Most conferences follow either TERMUN Procedure or a loose version of THIMUN Procedure. The traditional major domestic Irish conferences include TERMUN, hosted by Terenure College, ROCKMUN, hosted by Blackrock College, and RADMUN, hosted by Rathdown School. Ireland is widely credited with having an incredibly extensive and competitive domestic MUN circuit, which makes Irish schools formidable in International Conferences. In recent years, Terenure College, Belvedere College, Blackrock College, and St. Andrew's College have been the most prominent and successful schools in Irish MUN.

==== The Netherlands ====
The largest secondary school MUN conference in the Netherlands is The Hague International Model United Nations (THIMUN) conference, which includes over 3500 participants, coming from around 200 schools and 100 countries. Although it is not located near the United Nations Headquarters in New York, it is one of the pioneer model United Nations conferences in the world, since it has been founded in 1968and located in the International Court of Justice's (ICJ) world city of The Hague. A whole network of conferences is marked by its THIMUN affiliation, a label which describes the universality of the procedures that rule the conference, and make it part of the UN recognized foundation. In 1995, the THIMUN Foundation was accredited as a Non-Governmental Organisation (NGO) associated with the United Nations Department of Global Communication. Additionally, THIMUN has established its own conferences' network throughout time: THIMUN Qatar, THIMUN Singapore, THIMUN Online MUN (O-MUN) and THIMUN Latin America conferences have been set up from 2005.

Additionally, the Netherlands hosts continental Europe's oldest university level MUN conference: The European International Model United Nations (TEIMUN) in the Hague, in addition to other large university level MUN conferences, such as the prestigious European Model United Nations (EuroMUN) in Maastricht.

==== Portugal ====
The Iberian Model United Nations (IMUN), held in Lisbon, is the largest MUN in Portugal and one of the largest high school MUN conferences in Europe. IMUN's keynote speakers have included politicians, diplomats, United Nations officials, and rights activists, such as author Richard Zimler, U.S. Ambassador Robert A. Sherman, and President of Portugal Marcelo Rebelo de Sousa.

==== Spain ====
MUN first arrived in Spain in 2006 with the organization of the Catalonia Model United Nations (C'MUN) in Barcelona. In 2019, Madrid hosted the Harvard World Model United Nations (WorldMUN), and among the 2,300 participants were 500 Spanish students belonging to 20 different universities. Madrid's bid for WorldMUN was led by the Spanish Alliance for Model United Nations (SAMUN), which reunited the students of the four public universities of Madrid: Complutense University of Madrid, Autonomous University of Madrid, Charles III University of Madrid and King Juan Carlos University.

=== North America ===
==== Canada ====
MUN arrived in Canada in the 1950s and 1960s at the Banff Centre. The Canadian International Model United Nations (CANIMUN) was established later, with its first event in 2003. Other MUN events across Canada include University of Toronto Model United Nations (UTMUN), a conference held annually in January at the University of Toronto, and the Secondary School United Nations Symposium (SSUNS) at McGill University in Montreal.

==== United States ====
Model United Nations is popular across the United States, with MUN clubs and conferences being found in every region. However, because Model UN is decentralized and has grown autonomously, there are significant disparities in how MUN is done between regions.

=== South America ===
==== Brazil ====
The Americas Model United Nations (AMUN) was the first MUN Conference to be held in Latin America, accomplishing 21 years of history in 2018 with the edition Bring Walls Down, Build Up Connections.

==== Peru ====
At the university level, Model United Nations started in Peru in 2006 with the United Nations Studies Circle (CENU), a college team from the University of Lima founded to compete at Harvard National Model United Nations. This team would evolve into a full-scale organization, the Peruvian Association for the Study of the United Nations (AENU Peru for its Spanish acronym), a non-for-profit NGO charged with task of promoting MUN in Peru and creating Peru's first "National Delegation", thus creating the Peruvian Universities Debate Team (PU). Starting their new trademark since 2011, PU's has garnered the Best Large Delegation award at Harvard World Model United Nations 2014 held in Brussels, Belgium, and the Best Large Delegation award at Harvard National Model United Nations - Latin America 2017, held in Lima, Peru.

In 2014, the Peruvian Debate Society (PDS) was founded by experienced MUN delegates as a new alternative towards competing in Harvard International Relations Council conferences. PDS has achieved the Best Large Delegation award at Harvard National Model United Nations Latin America in 2018. The team won the Best Large Delegation award at the 2018 edition of WorldMUN, held in Panama City. A year later, at WorldMUN 2019 in Madrid, they won an Outstanding Large Delegation award.

At high school level, MUN has been an extracurricular activity since 2012, with the first high school conference Lima Model United Nations (LiMUN) 2012, followed by Markham Model United Nations (MkMUN) 2015, Villa Maria Model United Nations (VMMUN) 2015, Newton Model United Nations (NewMUN) 2015, and Carmelitas Model United Nations 2015, being the latter school the host for the first Ivy League Model United Nations Conference Peru (ILMUNC 2016). Each school delegation hosts its own conference, including Lima, Cusco, Arequipa and Piura.

== Notable participants ==
- Ban Ki-moon, former Secretary-General of the United Nations
- Chelsea Clinton, former first daughter of the United States
- Dokibird, vTuber
- George Stephanopoulos, television journalist and former adviser to U.S. President Bill Clinton
- Joel Stein, American journalist, former writer for the Los Angeles Times and regular contributor to Time
- Kiyotaka Akasaka, former UN Under-Secretary-General for Communications and Public Information
- Nick Fuentes, American far-right political commentator
- Pierre Poilievre, leader of the Conservative Party of Canada and Leader of the Official Opposition of Canada
- Paul Ryan, former speaker of the United States House of Representatives, 2012 US vice-presidential nominee, and former congressman from Wisconsin
- Rainn Wilson, actor best known for playing Dwight Schrute on NBC's The Office
- Stephen M. Schwebel, former judge and president of the International Court of Justice
- Suzan G. LeVine, former U.S. Ambassador to Switzerland and Liechtenstein
- Tom Donilon, former National Security Advisor in the Obama administration
- Willem-Alexander of the Netherlands, King of the Netherlands

== See also ==
- Debate
- Experiential learning
- Global civics
- Global Classrooms
- Mock election
- Mock trial
- Model Arab League
- Model Congress
- Model European Union Strasbourg
- Model G20
- Moot court
- United Nations Association of the United States of America
