= Elevenses =

Late morning meal/snack

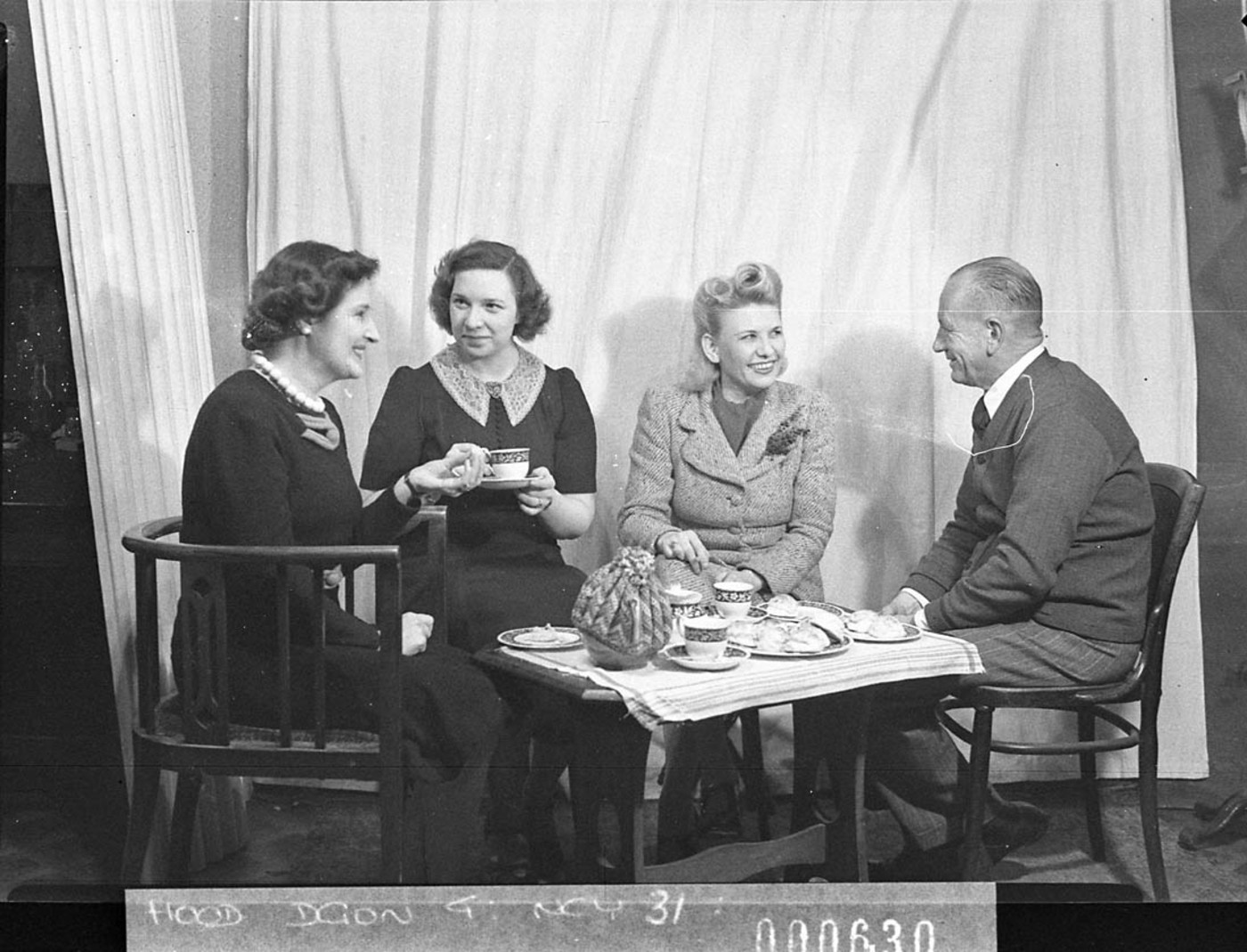
People drinking morning tea

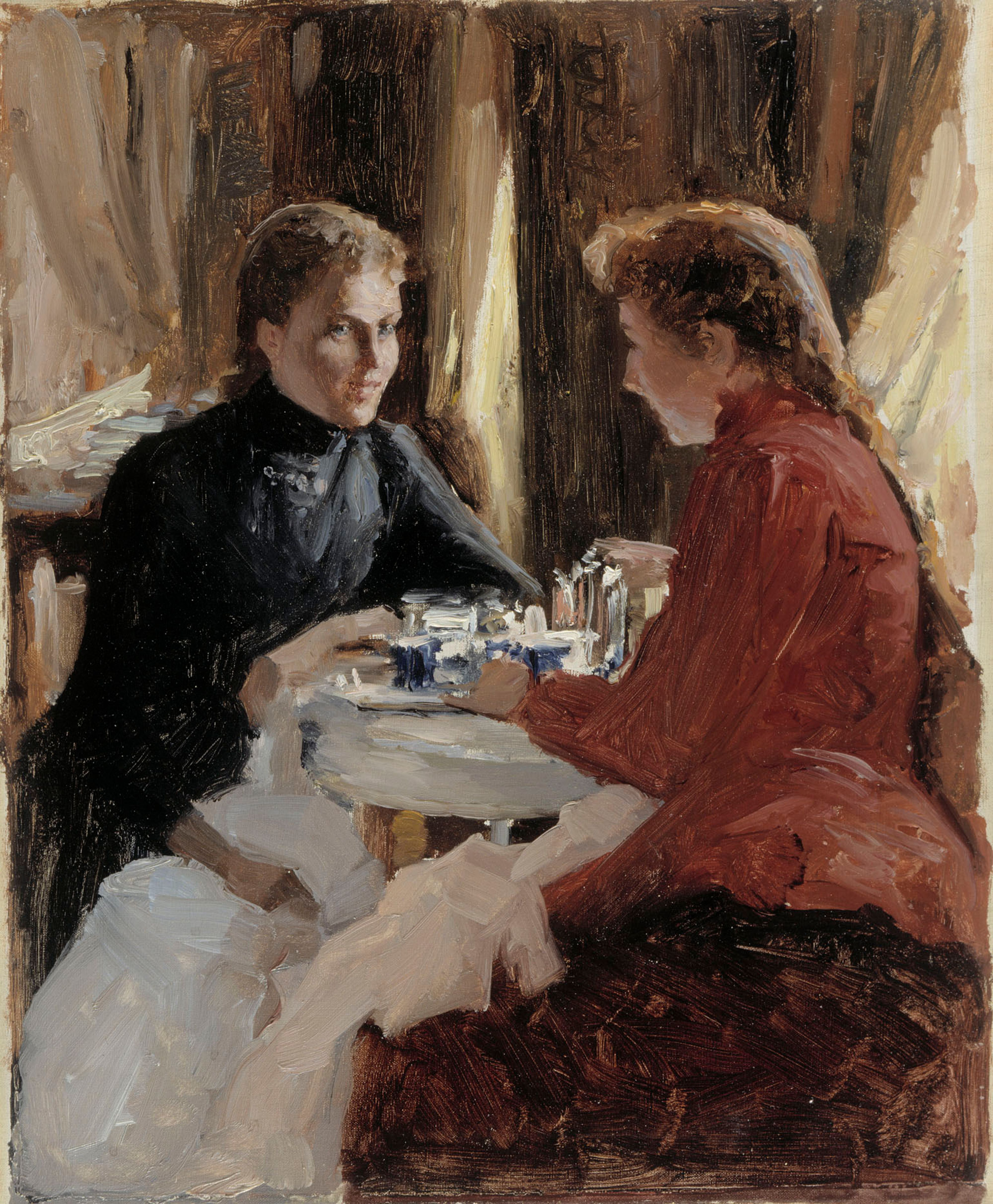
1884 painting by Albert Edelfelt, titled Elevenses

Elevenses (/ɪˈlɛvənzɪz/) is a short break taken at around 11:00 a.m. to consume a drink or snack. The names and details vary among countries.

== Regional variations ==
=== Australia and New Zealand ===
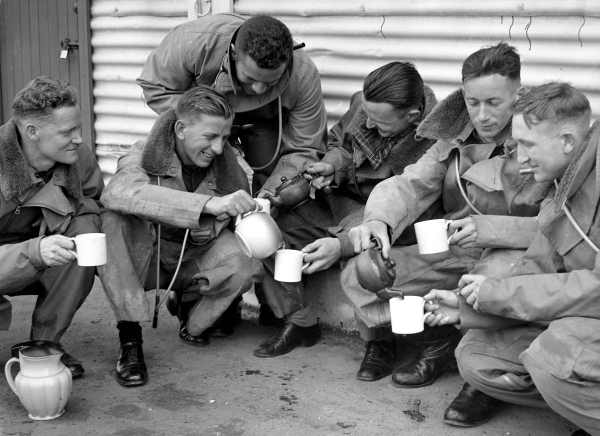
Australian airmen sharing morning tea

Australia and New Zealand have "morning tea" that occurs at approximately 10:30 a.m. This is often a break from work that is formally codified into some workplace agreements. It is standard practice for schools to have a morning tea break for students, which may be colloquially known as little lunch. Many workplaces organise an event or celebration during morning tea in order to welcome new employees, say farewell to colleagues who are leaving (e.g. retirement), to commemorate special occasions such as birthdays, or simply as a regular social event for staff to get together.

Farmers, shearers and tradespeople in both countries often refer to this mid-morning break as a smoko, which has origins in having a break for smoking. However, despite the literal meaning, the phrase is in common use by non-smokers, who may simply partake in having a cup of tea or coffee instead at this time.

=== Belgium ===
In Flemish, this type of snack is called "tienuurtje", lit. 'a little (one of) 10 o'clock'. A tienuurtje typically consists of one or more cookies or some piece of fruit and may be accompanied by fruit juice or chocolate milk. Many parents give their children a tienuurtje to eat during the mid-morning school break. A similar type of snack for the afternoon break is called "vieruurtje", lit. 'little (one of) 4 o'clock'.

=== Bolivia ===
In Bolivia, elevenses are consumed at 11:00am; called Salteñadas, where the Bolivian Salteña is consumed usually with a soft drink.

This has spread to all social classes and regions of the country.

Usually by noon all Salteña vendors have run out of the savory dish.

=== Chile ===
In Chile, elevenses is observed under the name las once or la once (in Spanish, once means 'eleven'). However, in Chile it has shifted to the afternoon, sometimes replacing the traditional dinner.

In the 2010–11 National Food Consumption Survey, around 80% of the Chileans reported having once. This is due to once sometimes replacing the traditional dinner in Chile, which only 30% of the population reported having. Here, traditional dinner means a proper meal with vegetables, meat, poultry and fish. La once resembles a light version of British High Tea.

An alternative widespread, but unfounded, popular etymology for the word in Chile is that priests (in other versions, workers or women) used the phrase tomar las once (Spanish: 'drink the eleven') in reference to the eleven letters of the word Aguardiente to conceal the fact that they were drinking during the day.

=== Colombia ===
In Colombia, it is common to have a snack named onces. It consists mainly of hot chocolate or coffee with arepa, bread, or crackers, usually taken around 17:00. In the morning, the snack consist of the same type of food but it is called "medias nueves". It is served generally between 09-11:00.

=== Germany ===
In Germany, a second breakfast (Zweites Frühstück) may be taken at 9:30. Most people nowadays will attribute German self-awareness of this to an advertisement for Knoppers, a chocolate-covered wafer bar, with the saying "Morgens, halb Zehn, in Deutschland…" ("In the morning, 9:30, in Germany…"), that had become its own meme. The most common snacks include filled rolls, e.g. Mettbrötchen (raw pork mince), Leberkäse, Schnitzel, three small sausages (Wiener or Nürnberger), etc., all preferably warm; or cold meats.

=== Hungary ===
Elevenses in Hungarian is called "tízórai", which translates to 'of the 10 o'clock', referring to "the meal of the 10 o'clock". This is a break between breakfast and lunch, when it is time for a light meal or snack. In a school environment, the early lunch break is called "tízórai". Parallel to the word elevenses, tízórai is often called Tenses "Tenzeez" by Hungarian-Americans and Hungarian-Britons.

=== India ===
In certain parts of rural India, especially in northern states, such as Punjab, it is normal practice to take a tea break two or three hours after breakfast. When the practice began, there was no set clock and break was usually between 10–11 a.m., so as in other countries it was named after the approximate time; Das-Baja, meaning '10 o'clock tea'.

The practice is slowly becoming obsolete in cities and towns, especially in professional jobs, but in rural areas; such breaks at that time for manual and agricultural labourers are still very popular.

=== Israel ===
In Israel, it is called ארוחת עשר (arukhat eser, Hebrew for '10 o'clock meal'), mostly eaten at schools and pre-schools in the form of homemade sandwiches, often accompanied with a fruit or other snack, after the second hour of the school day and before the so-called "small break". It also occurs in major unionised workplaces, such as factories and call centres, where workers are given tea to drink.

=== Netherlands ===
In West Friesland, country people had a similar meal called "konkelstik" (served at konkeltiid, the proper time for konkelen, a verb denoting "making a visit").

On school days, NOS, the main Dutch news station, broadcasts a 10 AM Jeugdjournaal news broadcast which is commonly viewed on Dutch primary schools before the children spent around 15 minutes playing outside during what is called the 'small break' ('kleine pauze'). During the viewing, children usually eat fruit, a small snack or 'school milk' (schoolmelk). However, whether or not these foods and drinks are provided by the school, what is done during the eating (instead of watching the journal, in lower grades, teachers will often read stories), if the food is eaten outside or in class and whether or not the pre-break happens at all varies wildly per school and per grade.

The 'small break' (kleine pauze) around 10.30 AM and the 'big break' (grote pauze) around 12.30 are the two most common breaks in Dutch primary as well as secondary schools. It is common on Dutch secondary schools to eat packed lunch during both breaks.

=== Poland ===
In Poland, the drugie śniadanie (lit. 'second breakfast') is eaten in the mid-morning. Rather than a heavy chunk of sausage or other meat, though, like the German second breakfast, Poles prefer sandwiches or a light, dessert-like pastry (e.g. sweet roll) or sweet with a hot drink, more similar to the American "coffee break".

=== Slovakia ===
In Slovakia, desiata (lit. 'tenth', from "tenth hour") can be eaten at or around 10 a.m.. It usually consists of a small snack, fruit, or a sandwich, i.e. a lighter meal, so as not to fill the stomach before lunch. In schools, the break between classes around 10 a.m. is referred to as desiatová prestávka (lit. 'tenth break' or 'break for the tenth') and may be a few minutes longer than other breaks, to give the students time to eat their desiata. Note: although the word desiata is grammatically an ordinal numeral, it is treated as a noun in this context.

=== Spain ===
In Spain, it is not uncommon to have a short meal break around 11:00 a.m., particularly in jobs of intense physical activity; this can range from a hot drink paired with light snacks like pastries to a sandwich, scrambled eggs or a piece of Spanish omelette (also known as a tortilla española). This meal is sometimes known as almuerzo, although this word is used inconsistently and mostly just means 'lunch'. However, lunchtime in Spain can be as late as 3:00 p.m., which conditions mid-morning customs.

In the Basque Country, in particular, it is common to have a mid-morning snack consisting of high-protein food like eggs, bacon, or cured meat on bread, called "hamarretako" (lit. '10 o'clock (snack)') or "hamaiketako" (lit. '11 o'clock (snack)').

=== Sweden ===
In Sweden, it is common to drink coffee at 11:00 a.m., elvakaffe (lit. 'coffee at eleven'), often with a few biscuits or a light sandwich.

=== Switzerland ===
In Switzerland, there is a Znüni '(Meal) at nine', following the nomenclature of Breakfast (Zmorge), Lunch (Zmittag), afternoon snack at four (Zvieri) and Dinner (Znacht). The name, despite referring to a specific time, stays the same no matter the actual time of the snack break; especially in schools, it is usually at 10:00 a.m..

=== United Kingdom ===
Elevenses, eaten at 11:00 a.m. as the name suggests, typically consists of tea or coffee, often with a few biscuits. Sometimes, cake or other snacks are eaten instead.

=== United States ===
During the first decades of the 19th century, elevenses consisted of drinking whiskey. In modern times, hourly workers take a break known as a coffee break, typically around 10:00 a.m., or in the first third of a work shift. Often, this is done in a break room, and small snacks may be eaten as well.

It is common for school children to have a short snack break, called "morning snack". This is offered in the morning before lunch, usually between 9:00 and 11:00 a.m. In Wisconsin and some other Midwestern states, this break is called "milk break" with students served a small carton of milk.

== In popular culture ==
In A.A. Milne’s ‘’Winnie-the-Pooh’’, Pooh arrives at Rabbit’s house for elevenses. When offered a choice between condensed milk or honey on his bread, Pooh responds “both – but never mind the bread.”

Paddington Bear often took elevenses at the antique shop on Portobello Road run by his friend Mr Gruber, for which Paddington would buy buns and Mr Gruber would make cocoa.

In J. R. R. Tolkien's The Lord of the Rings, elevenses is one of the many meals that is enjoyed by the Hobbits of the Shire, served daily between second breakfast and luncheon. In addition, a party is implied to be particularly lavish in that food was served "continuously from elevenses until six-thirty".

In Fireman Sam, Dilys Price regularly took elevenses at Bella Lasagne's café.

== See also ==
- Second breakfast
- Break (work)
- Tea (meal)
