= Sheel Vohra =

Personal information
- Born: 29 May 1936; Naushera, British India
- Died: 13 October 2010 (aged 74); Dehradun, India
- Nickname: Bond
- Batting: Right-handed
- Role: Wicket-keeper

Domestic team information
- Years: Team
- 1965/66: Uttar Pradesh
- Source: Cricinfo, 8 October 2022

Sheel Vohra (29 May 1936 – 10 October 2010) was an Indian cricketer, mathematician and schoolmaster. He is known for playing in the Ranji Trophy tournament representing the Uttar Pradesh cricket team.

== Life and career ==
Sheel was born in the Pakistani village of Naushera (at the time British India) in 1936. After trying his hand at Cricket he studied mathematics at Master's level at D.A.V College. A road accident causing a leg injury curtailed his sporting ambitions. In 1961, he joined The Doon School as a Maths teacher where he remained for the next 40 years. At Doon, he mentored the Gandhis: Rajiv Gandhi, who went on to become the youngest Prime Minister of India and Rahul Gandhi who is currently a Member of Parliament.

He died on 10 October 2010 days before Doon celebrated its Platinum Jubilee. Notable personalities such as Ramchandra Guha and Karan Thapar expressed their grief for the teacher who had taught them back in the 70s.
