= UN Youth New Zealand =

- Abbreviation: UN Youth NZ
- Formation: 1999
- Type: Non-governmental organisation
- Headquarters: Wellington
- Location: New Zealand
- Region served: Auckland, Wellington, Canterbury, Otago
- National President: Charlie Mudgway
- Board of Directors' Chairperson: Henri McKenzie Blakeley
- Website: www.unyouth.org.nz

UN Youth New Zealand (formerly the United Nations Youth Association of New Zealand or UNYANZ) is a non-governmental organisation and a registered charity. Its members are all aged 25 or under or are full-time tertiary students. It is the largest youth-for-youth organisation in New Zealand. Annually, over 3,000 young New Zealanders (Kiwis) engage with a UN Youth event.

UN Youth's stated mission is 'to inspire young people to be engaged global citizens. to achieve their goal they host international tours, national conferences and regional events for secondary and tertiary students.

UN Youth is the youth arm of the United Nations Association of New Zealand (UNANZ), which is a member of the World Federation of United Nations Associations (WFUNA).

== Events ==
=== International Tours ===
UN Youth's National Executive appoints tertiary student volunteers as Directors who organise and run five international tours. Delegations often visit United Nations Departments, Embassies, Universities, Non-Governmental Organisations, businesses and other organisations.

UN Youth runs three tours for secondary students.

1. Global Development Tour: This tour travels around Europe and New York. The focus is on learning about the Sustainable Development Goals.
2. Pacific Leadership Tour: This tour travels to Australia and Samoa or Vanuatu.
3. Evatt Competition: This tour travels to Australia and the delegation competes in UN Youth Australia's Evatt Competition.

UN Youth runs two tours for tertiary students.

1. North American Leadership Tour: This tour travels around the United States and Mexico.
2. Globalisation Tour: This tour travels to China and around Southeast Asia.

=== National Conferences ===
UN Youth's National Executive appoints tertiary student volunteers as National Committee Members who organise and run three national events. Events often involve educational committee sessions, engaging workshops and social events.

UN Youth's three national events are for secondary students. Each national event attracts between 150 - 350 students.

1. Aotearoa Youth Declaration: This four-day event is held in April in Auckland. Participants are placed in policy focus groups. Participants will learn about existing policies and then make recommendations for decision-makers such as the New Zealand Government, local council bodies and ministries. All the recommendations are compiled into a document called a 'Declaration'.
2. New Zealand Model United Nations: This four-day event is held in July in Wellington at the Victoria University of Wellington. Participants are delegates representing an allocated member state of the United Nations. Delegates will debate pressing global issues such as nuclear disarmament, climate change and urbanisation.
3. New Zealand Model Parliament: This three-day event is held in September in Canterbury at the University of Canterbury. Participants are Members of Parliament representing a party of the New Zealand Parliament. Participants will debate a mock bill on a pressing domestic issue.

=== Regional Events ===
UN Youth's Regional Councils appoint tertiary student volunteers as Regional Committee Members who organise and run various regional events.

Additionally, Regional Councils work with High School Ambassadors to promote UN Youth.

== Structure ==
UN Youth has a Board of Directors and a National Executive who lead the organisation. Additionally, they have an Extended Leadership Group consisting of National Executive members, National Conference Coordinators and Regional Council Presidents.

=== Board of Directors ===
The Board of Directors is the highest authority and policy-making body within the organisation. Their primary obligation is to ensure the organisation has a sustainable long-term strategy in achieving its mission. This includes monitoring financial performance, performing risk assessments and reviewing organisational policies.

The Board of Directors is composed of Ordinary Directors, Independent Directors, the National President and a Volunteers' Representative. The Board of Directors' administrative responsibilities are carried out by a Board Secretary. The Board of Directors meets virtually at least once every six weeks. Additionally, they have an Appointments Committee; Financial, Risk and Audit Committee; Vision 2035 Steering Committee; and Policy, Impact and Culture Committee, which meet regularly.

=== National Executive ===
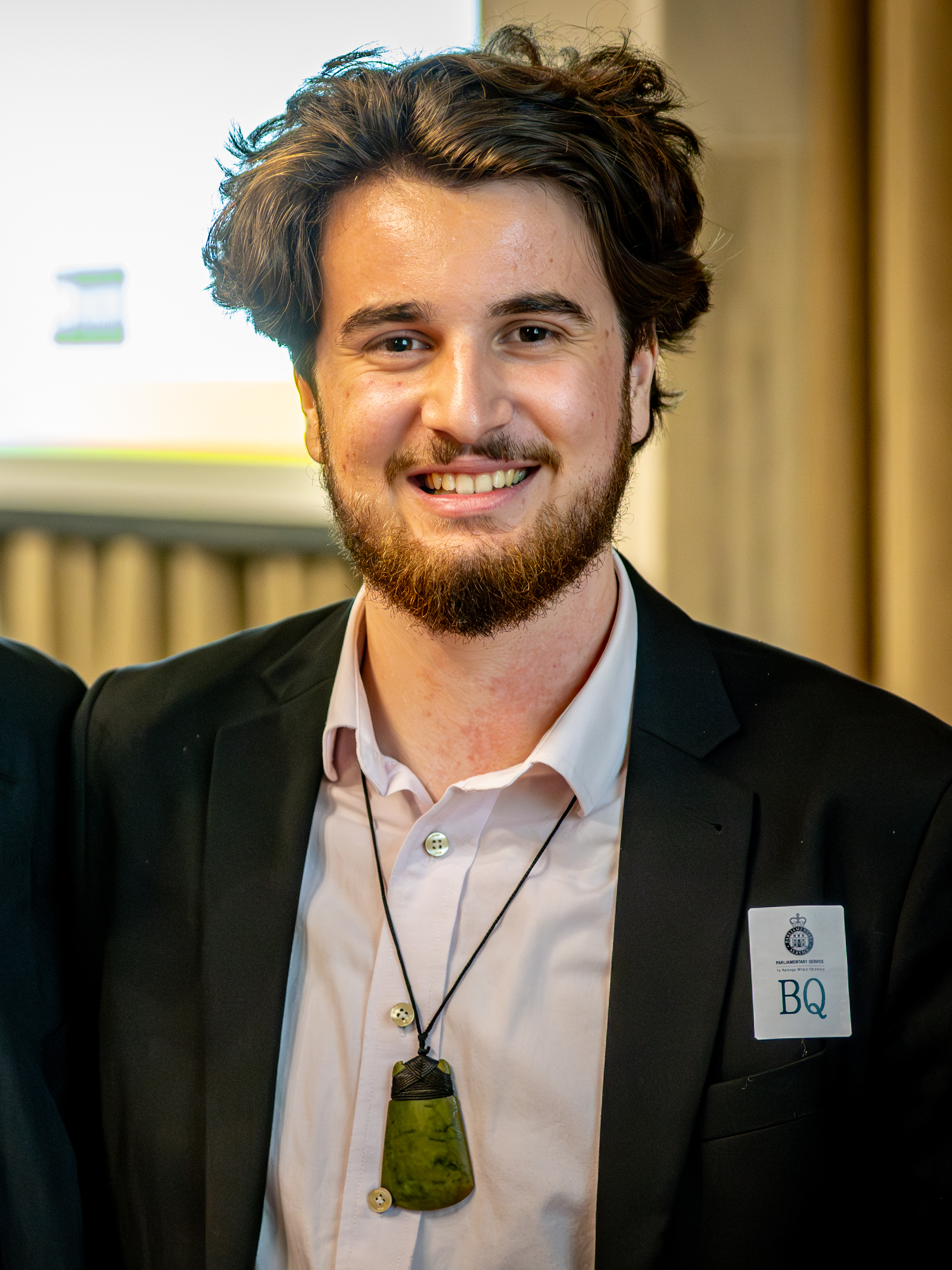
Current President, Charlie Mudgway

The National Executive manages day-to-day functions and oversees all operations of the organisation. Their primary obligation is to ensure the organisation is functioning efficiently, and they are accountable to the Board of Directors. This includes overseeing three National Committees and four Regional Councils.

The National Executive comprises the National President, National Communications Officer, National Education Officer, National Finance Officer, National Information Officer, National Māori and Pasifika Peoples Officer, National Operations Officer, National People Officer, National Relations Officer, National Welfare and Equity Officer and International Operations Officer. The National Executive meets virtually around three times a month.

=== Regional Councils ===
UN Youth has four Regional Councils that oversee the running of regional events and programmes across New Zealand. The four Regional Councils of UN Youth New Zealand are UN Youth Auckland, UN Youth Wellington, UN Youth Canterbury and UN Youth Otago/Southland. Their primary obligation is running regional events and programmes, including administering the High School Ambassador programme in their wider regions, and they are accountable to the Board of Directors.

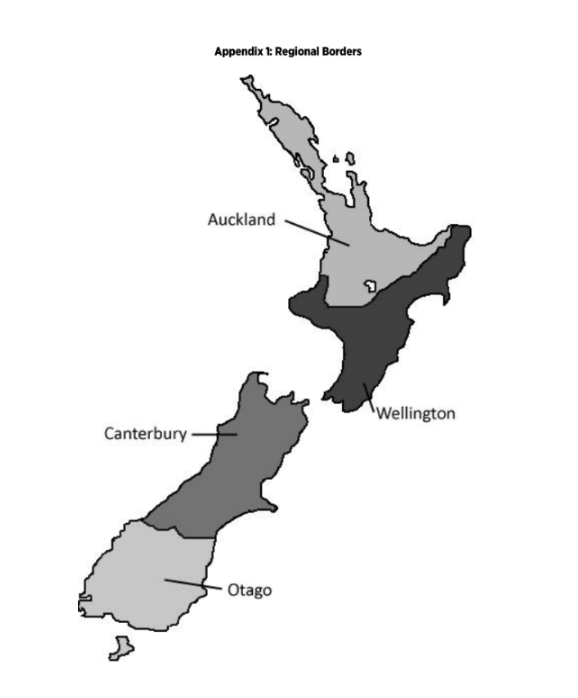
UN Youth NZ Regional Council Jurisdictions

Each Regional Council is led by a Regional President. As of January 2026, the four UN Youth Regional Presidents are: Luca Gemmell-Taylor for UN Youth Auckland, Milo White for UN Youth Wellington, Hugh Ryan for UN Youth Canterbury, and Ana Ayora for UN Youth Otago.

== See also ==
- United Nations Youth Australia
- United Nations Association
- Model United Nations
