= The Doon School Model United Nations =

- The DSMUN logo is a synthesis of the United Nations emblem and the school's "Lamp of Knowledge" logo
- Abbreviation: DSMUN
- Formation: 2007
- Location(s): The Doon School; Dehradun; India
- Members: c.500 delegates 40–45 schools
- Secretary General: Ayaan Mittal
- President: Uday Pratap Sardana (UPS)
- Deputy Secretary General: Rajveer Agarwal
- Executive Director: Arsh Mishra
- Vice Presidents: Vir Singh Sandhu, Nanda Karumudi, Reyansh Agarwal
- Faculty Advisor: Rageshree Das Gupta, Mohit Ghai, Anuradha Singh
- Website: dsmun.net/

The Doon School Model United Nations (DSMUN) is an annual Model United Nations conference run by The Doon School, an all-boys boarding school in Dehradun, India. Founded in 2007, it is one of Asia's largest MUNs in terms of number of delegates and committees. It is held on the school campus on a weekend in August. The conference receives students from all over the Indian subcontinent, including Pakistan, Nepal, Bangladesh, as well as in recent years from Dubai and Oman.

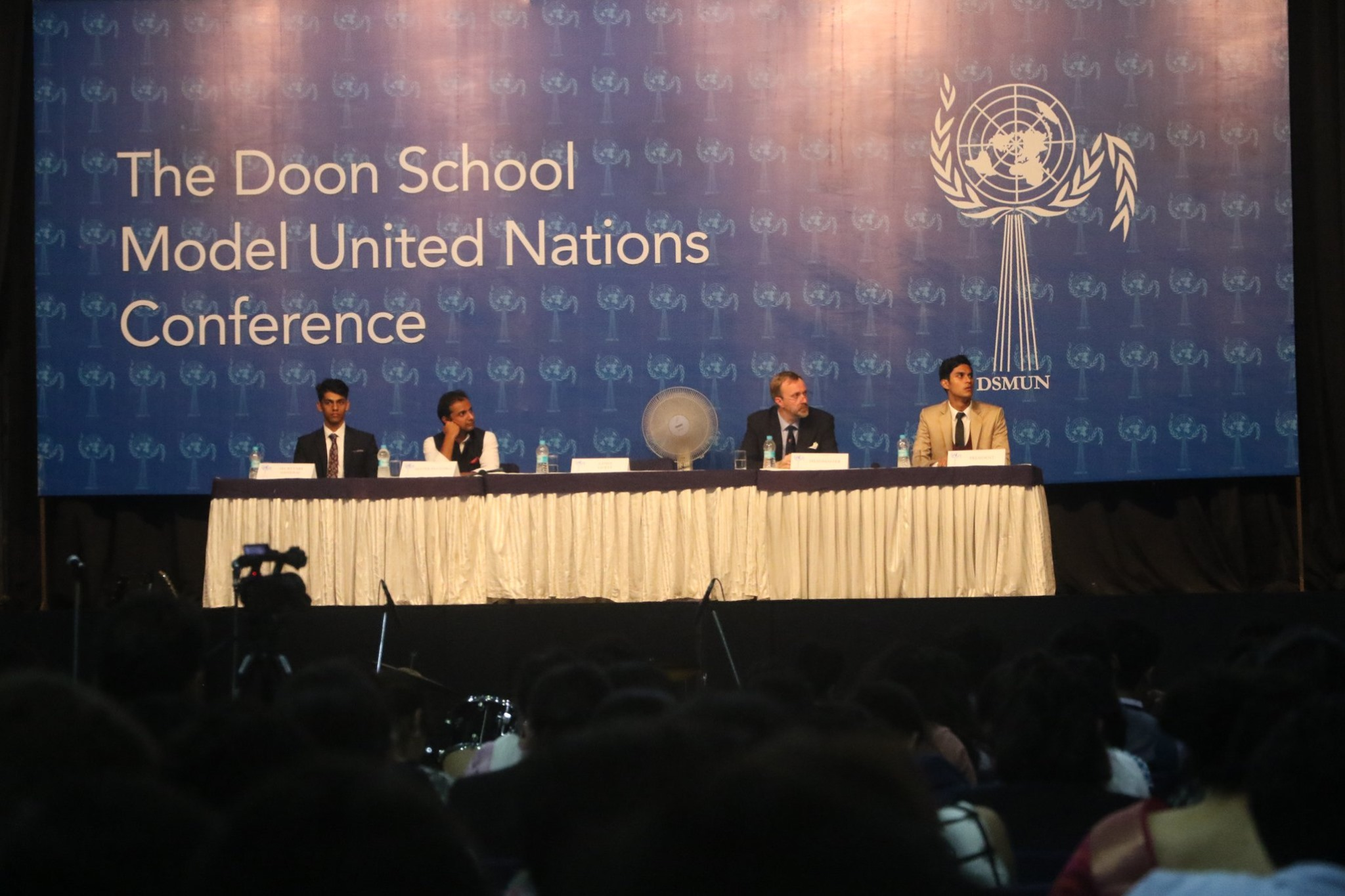
DSMUN, August 2019.

== General information ==
DSMUN was founded as an inter-school conference in 2007. Over the years, it attracted local schools and then, later, from across the Indian subcontinent and beyond, becoming one of India's largest conferences. It is considered one of the most prestigious MUNs in the Asia-Pacific region, regularly drawing over 500 delegates from over 40–45 schools.

=== Committee sessions ===
Committees include United Nations General Assembly, the Security Council, subcommittees of ECOSOC and crisis simulation committees. Delegates represent different countries to debate current international and regional issues. In recent years, special non-conventional committees have been devised at DSMUN, inspired by the local politics of the region or landmark historical decisions and events, such as Lincoln's War Cabinet (1861), Union Cabinet of Ministers (1984), Viceroy's Executive Council (1946) a Lok Sabha simulation, cabinet meetings of Russia, India and China, and a special convention on religion and terror.

=== Social events ===
Apart from the usual committees and debates, social and cultural events are held for the delegates, including music concerts, dance evening, tea and formal dinner.

=== Guest speakers ===
Chief guests and guest speakers at the conference usually feature prominent Indian politicians or diplomats. In the recent years, they've included:

- 2013 – Salman Khurshid, Jairam Ramesh
- 2015 – Sujatha Singh
- 2016 – Pavan Varma
- 2017 – Rahul Gandhi
- 2018 – Kalikesh Narayan Singh Deo
- 2019 – Yashvardhan Kumar Sinha
- 2021 – Kiren Rijiju, Kalikesh Narayan Singh Deo

== See also ==
- The Doon School
- List of model United Nations conferences
