= United Nations Youth Australia =

Youth organisation

UN Youth Australia Ltd.
- Founded: 1970
- Type: Charity and Company limited by guarantee
- Purpose: Youth empowerment International Relations; United Nations
- Headquarters: Melbourne, Australia
- Key people: National President: Steph Beaumont; Board Chair: Ruby Abercromby
- Affiliations: World Federation of United Nations Associations via United Nations Association of Australia
- Website: www.unyouth.org.au
- Formerly called: United Nations Youth Association of Australia / United Nations Association of Australia Youth

UN Youth Australia is a national youth-led organisation which seeks to educate and empower young Australians on global issues and foster an understanding of the work of the United Nations, human rights and International relations in young Australians. The organisation is fully operated by volunteers who have left high school and are under the age of 25, over 15,000 young people participate in UN Youth Australia’s programs, activities and events each year.

UN Youth Australia is affiliated with, but is not a division of or run by, the United Nations Association of Australia which has a consultative status with ECOSOC as a member of the World Federation of United Nations Associations. UN Youth also works closely with The Australian Department of Foreign Affairs and Trade on the annual Australian Youth Representative to the United Nations program.

UN Youth is a federated organisation overseen by the Board of Directors which appoint a National Executive, with divisions in each state and territory overseen by independent executives. Each division is run independently and collaborate to organise national events and programs.

== Activities ==
UN Youth Australia is run entirely by a team of over 1,000 volunteers aged under 25.

=== National Activities ===
UN Youth Australia holds three annual national events: the UN Youth National Conference, the National Finals of the Evatt Competition, a UN Security Council Competition named after Dr H.V. Evatt, and the National Finals of the Voice Competition, a public speaking competition. Participants in these conferences are students from secondary schools across Australia. The conferences are held in Australian capital cities designated on a rotational system.

==== National Conference ====
National Conference is a week-long educational conference for students in year 9 to 12, held in a different capital city each year. Each State and Territory division of UN Youth Australia, UN Youth New Zealand and some international organisations send delegates to National Conference.

==== Evatt Competition ====
UN Youth Australia and its State and Territory divisions organises one of the largest high school tournaments in Australia: the National Evatt Competition which is a UN Security Council Model United Nations competition named after the distinguished Australian politician, diplomat and jurist Dr H.V. Evatt.

==== Voice Competition ====
Voice is a public speaking competition for students in years 7 to 10. Student are asked to pitch a solution to a social, economic or political problem, and then answer impromptu questions from the judges.

=== International Activities ===
In addition to domestic conferences, UN Youth Australia also operates six international tours.

==== American Political Tour ====
Each year in January, a delegation of secondary school students tours the United States, meeting US and UN officials in Washington, D.C. and New York.

==== Young Diplomats Tour ====
Also in January, UN Youth Australia sends a delegation of 16 secondary school students to visit the United Nations Office in Vienna as part of a European tour focusing on international relations, modern history, and organisations in Europe relevant to global politics.

==== Timor-Leste Project ====
In July UN Youth Australia runs the Pacific Project which, in partnership with Destination Dreaming, arranges for secondary school students to visit development projects, meet diplomats, see NGO operations first hand, and have a chance to experience life in East Timor.

==== Aotearoa Leadership Tour ====
Also in July, the organisation sends a delegation of secondary school students on the Aotearoa Leadership Tour which promotes interculturalism and engagement between indigenous and non-indigenous young Australians through a tour of New Zealand focusing on Māori culture and Maori-Pākehā relations, organised in close collaboration with UN Youth New Zealand.

==== Middle East Experience ====
In 2015, UN Youth Australia began the Middle East Experience program, in which secondary school delegates tour 2 countries in the region.

==== Emerging Leaders Program ====
In 2019, UN Youth Australia launched the Emerging Leaders Program, in which 16 secondary students from all over Australia tour Japan, South Korea and China.

=== Divisional Activities ===
Divisions of UN Youth Australia also coordinate events in their State or Territory, such as annual State Conferences and divisional rounds of the Evatt Competition, Voice Competition, educative school visits and speakers forums.

== Australian Youth Representative to the United Nations ==
Each year since 1999, UN Youth Australia works with the Department of Foreign Affairs and Trade to select and support a Youth Representative to the United Nations General Assembly. The Youth Representative holds an extensive, nationwide consultation tour to engage with and discover the issues that are most important to young Australians, and travels to New York as an accredited member of the Australian Mission to represent Australian youth at the United Nations.

=== Office holders ===
Name	Year	UNGA Statement
Andrew Hudson	1999	
Carrie McDougall	2000	
Kirsten Hagon	2001	
Rebecca Jenkin	2002	
Adam Smith	2003	
Cat Thao Nguyen	2004	
Ben Whitehouse	2005	
Elise Klein	2006	
Ben Groom	2007	
Elizabeth Shaw and Melanie Poole	2008	
Chris Varney	2009	
Samah Hadid	2010	
Benson Saulo	2011	
Dan Ryan	2012	
Adam Pulford	2013	
Laura John	2014	
Shea Spierings	2015	
Chris Eigeland	2016	
Paige Burton	2017	
Amos Washington	2018	
Kareem El-Ansary	2019	
Lucy Stronach	2020/21	
Angelica Ojinnaka	2022	
Imogen Kane	2023	
Gavin Choong / Vasil Samardzhiev	2024	
Satara Uthayakumaran	2025	
