= Bangladesh Model United Nations =

Bangladesh Model United Nations (BANMUN)
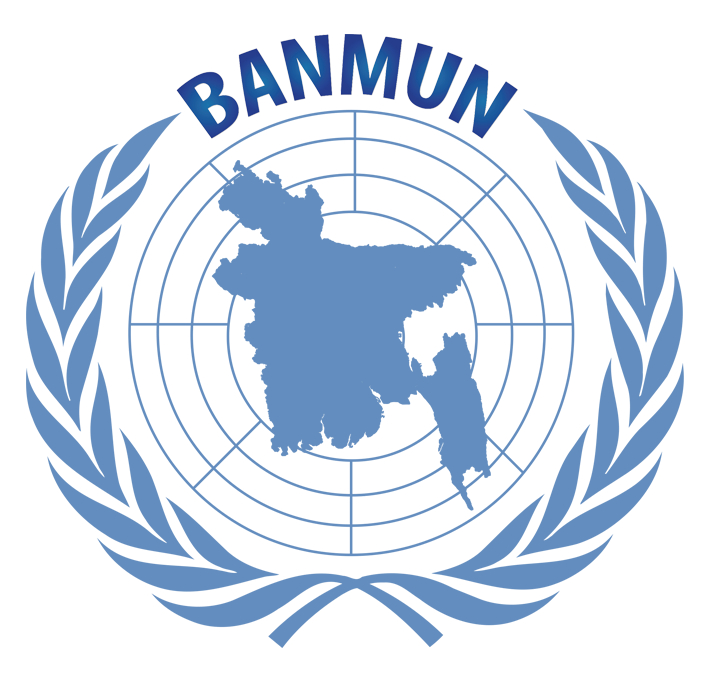
- Bangladesh MUN
- Location: Bangladesh
- Website: banmun.net

Bangladesh Model United Nations (BANMUN) is a Model United Nations conference organized by the United Nations Youth and Students Association of Bangladesh (UNYSAB). UNYSAB organizes the conference to promote the idea of Model United Nations among the students from different educational institutions in Bangladesh.

Model United Nations (also known as Model UN or simply MUN) is an educational simulation that focuses on civics, communications, and multilateral diplomacy. During a Model United Nations conference, students take on roles as foreign diplomats and participate in a simulated session of an intergovernmental organization (IGO). Participants research a country, take on a role as a diplomat, investigate international issues, debate, deliberate, consult, and then develop solutions to world issues.

BANMUN is an academic simulation of the United Nations that aims to educate participants about civics, effective communication, globalisation and multilateral diplomacy.

== History ==
The United Nations Youth and Students Association of Bangladesh (UNYSAB) is the pioneer of Model United Nations in Bangladesh.

The first ever Model United Nations conference in Bangladesh was organized by UNYSAB in association with UNAB and UNIC- Dhaka in October, 2002 on terrorism in observance of the United Nations day.

Later on, UNYSAB organized the second conference of Model United Nations in Bangladesh on 21 October 2003. HIV/AIDS was the topic of the discussion of that conference.

United Nations Youth and Students Association of Bangladesh (UNYSAB) and Campaign for Popular Education (CAMPE) jointly organized a two-day 'Model United Nations Conference on quality education and Millennium Development Goals' at the IDB building on June 28–29, 2006. This was the third conference of Model United Nations in Bangladesh.

After organizing three Model United Nations conference successfully the UNYSAB was out to organize Bangladesh Model United Nations for University and School level students in 2011. In 2011, UNYSAB organized the Bangladesh Model United Nations 2011.

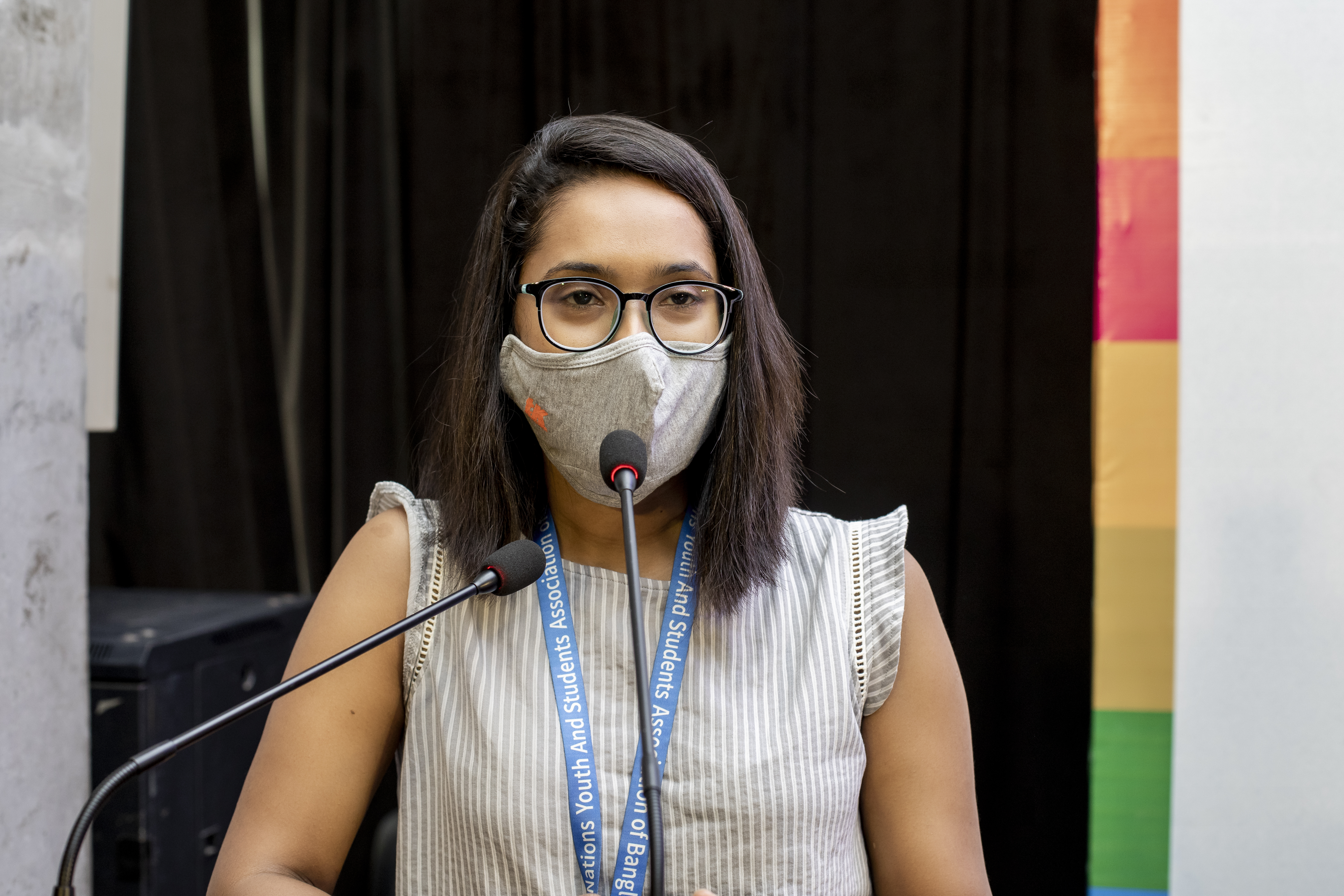
Shammy Wadud, President, United Nations Youth and Students Association of Bangladesh (UNYSAB)

== Conferences ==
Bangladesh has experienced five conferences of Bangladesh Model United Nations (BANMUN) so far. Another phase of BANMUN conference is yet to begin on June 24, 2014, the sixth session of BANMUN.

=== Model United Nations on Combating Terrorism-BANMUN 2002 ===
The Model United Nations on Terrorism also the first conference of BANMUN was held in Islamic Development Bank auditorium in Dhaka from October 24 to 26, 2002.

=== Model Word Summit on HIV/AIDS 2003 ===
The second conference was organized in association with UNIC again in October, 2003 and the topic of discussion was HIV/AIDS.

The Speaker of Bangladesh National Parliament, Barrister Jamir Uddin Sircar was present as Chief Guest while Professor Dr. M. Asaduzzaman also the Chairman of University Grants Commission was present as special guest. United Nations Resident Coordinator Mr. Jorgen Lissner presided over the opening session.

=== Model United Nations on Quality education and MDG, 2006 ===
UNYSAB and CAMPE jointly organized the Model United Nations Conference on Quality education and Millennium Development Goals at the Islamic Development Bank building on June 28–29, 2006.

=== Bangladesh Model United Nations 2011 ===
The Bangladesh Model United Nations 2011, was held in 2011 in the United International University at the Dhanmondi campus from October 13 to 15. The theme of the conference was 'Ensuring Food for All'.

=== Bangladesh Model United Nations 2013 ===
The Bangladesh Model United Nations 2013 kicked off with the theme 'Sustainable development of South Asia'. The conference was hosted with the aim of educating Bangladeshi school students about effective communication, globalization and multilateral diplomacy.

The conference was held in the Notre Dame College, Dhaka and UNIC auditorium from October 25 to 26. This was the first Model United Nations conference for young diplomats from secondary and higher secondary level students of Bangladesh.

=== Bangladesh Model United Nations 2014 ===
The conference of Bangladesh Model United Nations (BANMUN) 2014 was launched on June 24, 2014. This time the Model United Nation conference took place in Oxford International School, Dhaka.

The theme of the conference was 'Youth for Development' keeping in mind that the dedication of youth can indeed bring a global change in the future. It was a platform for the school students to explore their ideas regarding the title.

=== Bangladesh Model United Nations 2015 ===
The seventh session of the conference, Bangladesh Model United Nations (BANMUN) 2015 was held at the Adamjee Cantonment College from July 29 to August 1. Organised by United Nations Youth and Students Association of Bangladesh (UNYSAB), it became the largest in the history of MUN conferences in Bangladesh with participation of 571 students as delegates.

Bangladesh Model United Nations 2016

The eighth session of the conference, Bangladesh Model United Nations (BANMUN) 2016 was held in Adamjee Cantonment College.

== See also ==
- United Nations Youth Associations
- Model United Nations
