= Australian Youth Representative to the United Nations =

- Incumbent; Janice Rodrigues since 1 January 2026
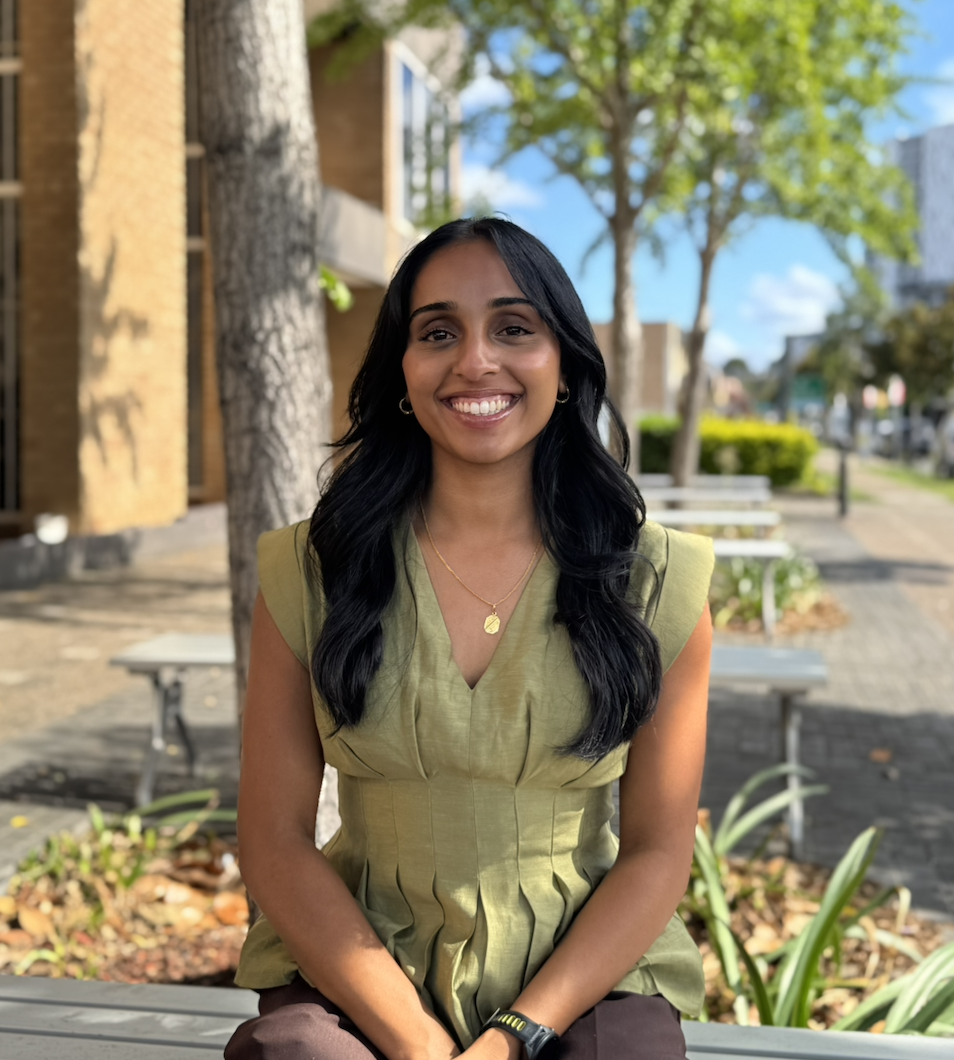
- Reports to: United Nations Youth Australia, Australian Government, The United Nations Photo of Janice Rodrigues, 2026 Australian Youth Representative to the United Nations.
- Term length: 1 Year
- Final holder: Satara Uthayakumaran

The Australian Youth Representative to the United Nations is a joint position created by partnership between UN Youth Australia and the Australian Government's Department of Foreign Affairs and Trade. Appointed yearly through a rigorous application process, the Youth Representative holds an extensive nationwide consultation, meeting with young Australians, politicians and leaders. Each year the Youth Representative travels to the United Nations' General Assembly in New York as an accredited member of the Australian Mission to the UN to deliver a statement on behalf of the young people of Australia. Upon returning to Australia the Youth Representative delivers a report to the Australian Federal Government along with all State and Territory Governments on the year's consultations and key findings along with recommendations.

In 2026, the Youth Representative to the United Nations is Janice Rodrigues.

== Listening Tour ==
Each year, the Youth Representative takes part in a comprehensive national listening tour, engaging with young people across Australia on issues that are important to them. The Youth Representative also meets MPs, Government Officials and NGOs to learn about service delivery, give advice and to represent the views and findings of young people in Australia. The listening tour usually includes a core theme or questions that is the basis for the tours consultations and findings.

The listening tour, which is supported by various levels of government, UN Youth Australia and the Department of Foreign Affairs and Trade holds consultations and meetings in all Australian States and Territories, major cities and regional towns along with rural and remote areas. Consultations and workshops are held in schools, universities, prisons, juvenile detention facilities and community venues.

== Attaché to the Australian Mission to the United Nations ==
Each year the Youth Representative travels to the United Nations General Assembly in New York as an accredited member of the Australian Mission to the United Nations, whilst at the UN the Youth Representative will engage with international leaders and deliver a speech representing the youth of Australia.

== Youth Representative Report ==
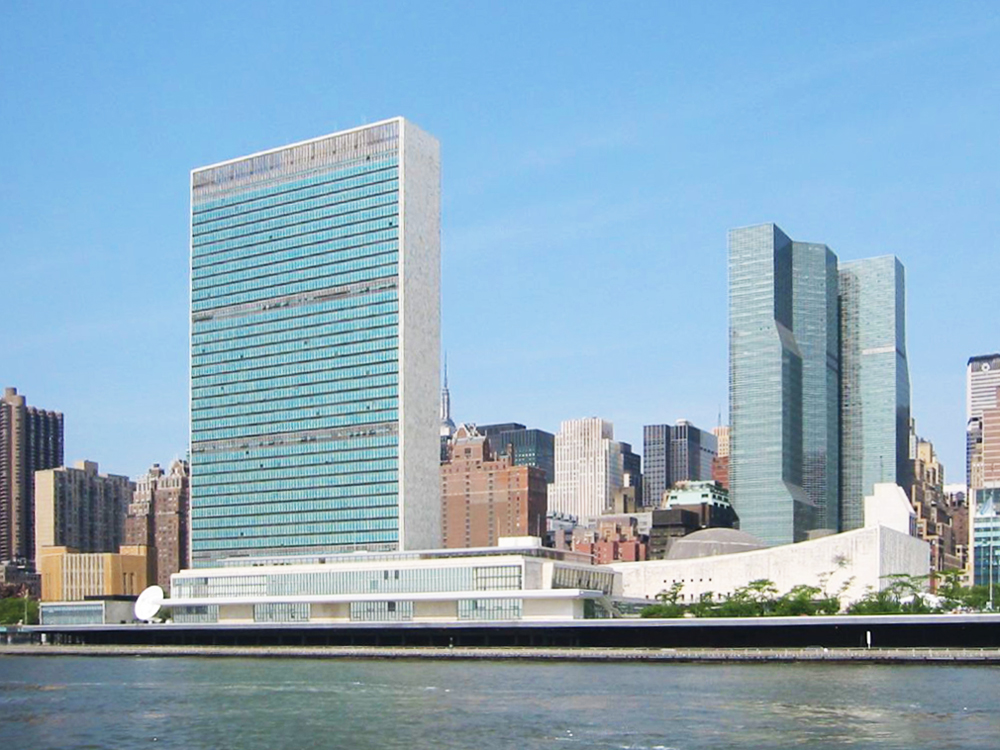
UN Headquarters in New York, New York, USA

As part of the Youth Representative program a report is delivered to the Australian Federal Government along with all State and Territory Governments outlining the findings and recommendations of the Youth Representative from their listening tour.

As described by Vasil Samardzhiev, Chief Youth Representation Officer in 2024, "the Report gives people of all spheres of work an insight into how young eyes view the world around them, and the change they do not yet see."

The 2024 Youth Representative Report captured over 2000 perspectives, and the 2025 Youth Representative Report captured 5000 perspectives from young Australians across every state and territory, across rural and urban communities, and from diverse backgrounds and identities.

== Office Holders ==
Name	Year	UNGA Statement
Andrew Hudson	1999	
Carrie McDougall	2000	
Kirsten Hagon	2001	
Rebecca Jenkin	2002	
Adam Smith	2003	
Cat Thao Nguyen	2004	
Ben Whitehouse	2005	
Elise Klein	2006	
Ben Groom	2007	
Elizabeth Shaw and Melanie Poole	2008	
Chris Varney	2009	
Samah Hadid	2010	
Benson Saulo	2011	
Dan Ryan	2012	
Adam Pulford	2013	
Laura John	2014	
Shea Spierings	2015	
Chris Eigeland	2016	
Paige Burton	2017	
Amos Washington	2018	
Kareem El-Ansary	2019	
Lucy Stronach	2020-21	
Angelica Ojinnaka	2022	
Imogen Kane	2023	
Gavin Choong / Vasil Samardzhiev	2024	
Satara Uthayakumaran	2025	
Janice Rodrigues	2026	
