= Chhota haazri =

Indian phrase – "little breakfast"

Chhota haazri or chota hazri (Hindi: छोटा हाज़िरी, from the Hindustani words for "small" and "presence") was a meal served in households and barracks, particularly in northern British India, shortly after dawn.

In subsequent years, the tradition of such a meal has disappeared, but the phrase lives on in Anglo-Indian households, certain regiments of the Indian Army, and in public schools —such as Bishop Cotton School Shimla, The Doon School, Dehradun, Colonel Brown Cambridge School, Dehradun, Mayo College, Ajmer, and St. Paul's School, Darjeeling, where it has come to refer to a cup of tea or hot milk with biscuits served early in the morning at around 6:00 a.m.

== Historical use of the word ==
The Russian traveller and writer Princess Olga Alexandrovna Shcherbatova (1857-1944) mentions partaking of "Chota Hazri" while visiting Mumbai in January 1891. She describes the meal, in Russian, as "the first morning tea, which in addition to biscuits and tea is always served with fruit: bananas, oranges, etc." ("первый утренный чай, за которым кроме чая и бисквитов всегда подают и фрукты: бананы, апельсины и пр.")

In 1912 explorer Aurel Stein wrote the following during an expedition across the mountains of Pashtunistan:

... 11.30 p.m. I was up again to start the next days work, and after a hasty Chota Hazri which my cook was determined to treat as a supper, I was ready to set my detachments in motion.

In The Jim Corbett omnibus in the man-eating leopard of Rudraprayag Jim Corbett wrote the following during the leopard hunt:

... I was up while it was still dark and was having chota hazri when I heard voices on the road.

In 1947, during the political integration of the Indian princely states, the word 'Chhota Hazri' was used as a pun to refer to a small princely state in an ironic way.

... First, a small headline, 'Mr V. P. Menon Visits State of Chhota Hazri';
Then, in the Governor-General's daily Court Circular, a brief notice, 'H. H. the Maharajah of Chhota Hazri has arrived';
And soon, a banner headline, 'CHHOTA HAZRI MERGED'.

'Chota Hazri' was the name of a highly successful thoroughbred horse in British Horse racing around the mid twentieth century.
