= United Nations Association of Australia =

Organisation

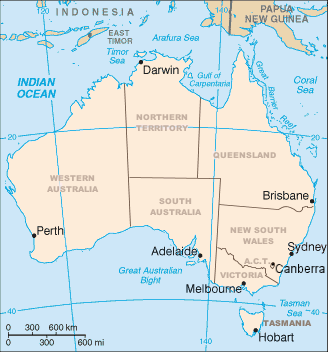
- UNAA Offices
- Abbreviation: UNAA
- Formation: 1946
- Type: NGO
- Legal status: Association
- Headquarters: Canberra
- Location: Brisbane, Sydney, Melbourne, Perth, Canberra, Hobart, Darwin, Adelaide
- Region served: Australia
- Official language: English
- Patron: Governor General and Mrs Hurley
- National president: Dr Donnell Davis
- Website: www.unaa.org.au

The United Nations Association of Australia (UNAA) is the official United Nations Association of Australia, working on behalf of the United Nations core body to promote its overall aims and ideals, and equally seeking to build support for the UN's programs, activities, and agencies. The UNAA official mission is "to inform, inspire and engage all Australians regarding the work, goals and values of the UN to create a safer, fairer and more sustainable world". It has division offices in every State and Territory of Australia, with the national office run out of Canberra.

== History ==
The UNAA was established in 1946 and in the following decades, the association and its state divisions grew and expanded their programs. In 1979 the Victorian division established the annual Media Peace Awards, followed by the establishment of the World Environment Day Awards.

During the International Year of the Tree (1982), the UNAA and the Nursery Industry Association of Australia founded an environmental organisation, Greening Australia, to protect, restore, and conserve Australia's native vegetation.

== Description and governance ==
The UNAA works closely with United Nations specialised agencies and departments such as the UNDPI, UNIC, and UNHCR, and has consultative status with ECOSOC as a member of the World Federation of United Nations Associations (WFUNA). The organisation also works closely with the Australian Government, especially the Australian Department of Foreign Affairs (DFAT) and Australian parliamentarians.

The UNAA is governed by a National Board and an Executive Team who take day to day responsibility for strategy implementation. Its national president is Dr Donnell Davis elected in November 2023. Previous Presidents included Dr Patricia Jenkings, 2023, Mario D'Elia 2019, Major General (Ret'd) Michael G. Smith AO 2016, Australian Senator Russell Trood, 2012 and Australian Politician Robert Hill.

== What it does ==
The UNAA also works to support various initiatives of the United Nations which focus on key international affairs topics such as (but not exclusive to):

- Climate change
- Gender equality
- Reconciliation with Australia's Indigenous peoples
- Refugees
- Sustainable development goals

The UNAA hosts over 150 events a year across Australia; hosts public awards ceremonies on a variety of social, media, and environmental topics; drives celebratory UN observance day activities; operates development projects overseas and generally acts as a key link between the UN and the Australian public.

The UNAA group includes a national academic network, a federal parliamentary group, divisions in every state and territory, a Young Professionals network, a Youth network, and a national office of volunteers.

== Awards ==
=== Media Peace Awards ===
The UNAA Media Peace Awards, established in 1979, were awarded on UN Day (24 October), to recognise Australian journalists and media organisations "who had excelled in their promotion of human rights and issues". Justice Kirby referred to the award as the Australian Media Peace Prize in his address at the 1981 presentation of the prize. These awards, later known as the UNAA Media Awards, or simply UN Day Media Awards, are no longer being presented, with the last being the 2018 awards, presented in 2019 by SBS journalist Sarah Abo.

In 1980, future Prime Minister Bob Hawke won the award.

In 1983, the film Women of the Sun won the award.

Between 2000 and 2016, prizes were awarded in several categories each year, covering print, film, television, and radio, and also issues such as Indigenous affairs, the environment, women's rights, and children's rights. The list of nominees and winners over this period is available online.

Film producer Darren Dale has won a UNAA award twice, and was a finalist once.

A 2015 finalist was an IQ2 debate at The Ethics Centre, for "its role in stimulating public awareness and understanding". The debate achieved prominence in the media owing to an address by journalist Stan Grant on "racism and the Australian Dream".

=== UN Day Honour ===
The UN Day Honour award was established by UNAA (NSW) as part of their United Nations Day (24 October) celebrations, the day that the UN Charter came into force in 1945. The award recognises "individuals or organisations in Australia that have made a significant contribution to the aims and objectives of the UN, for example in promoting peace, respect for human rights, equal opportunities, social justice and environmental sustainability". Recipients include:

- 2017: Australian Red Cross
- 2018: Hon. Michael Kirby AC CMG
- 2019: Reconciliation Australia
- 2020: Sam Mostyn

=== Other awards ===
The United Nations Association Global Leadership Prize was awarded to Indigenous writer and activist Maureen Watson in 1996.

== Model United Nations ==
The UNAA’s Victorian division hosts student Model United Nations (MUN) Conferences in high schools and universities around the state. These day-long conferences aim to increase student awareness of the United Nations, its processes, values, and the complex issues brought before the UN and the international community, while developing a sense of civic responsibility as future global citizens.

== UNAA Young Professionals Network ==
The UNAA Young Professionals (UNAA YP) network involves and inspires young professionals throughout Australia in international affairs and the work of the United Nations around the world, through fund-raising, awareness-raising, and advocacy campaigns.

== United Nations Youth Australia (UNYA) ==
United Nations Youth Australia (UNYA) is a youth led organisation, born out of the organisation in the 1970s. Its members are aged below 25 years. UN Youth Australia is not a division of, or run by, the UNAA.
