= Sudhir Khastgir =

Bengali painter (1907–1974)

Sudhir Ranjan Khastgir
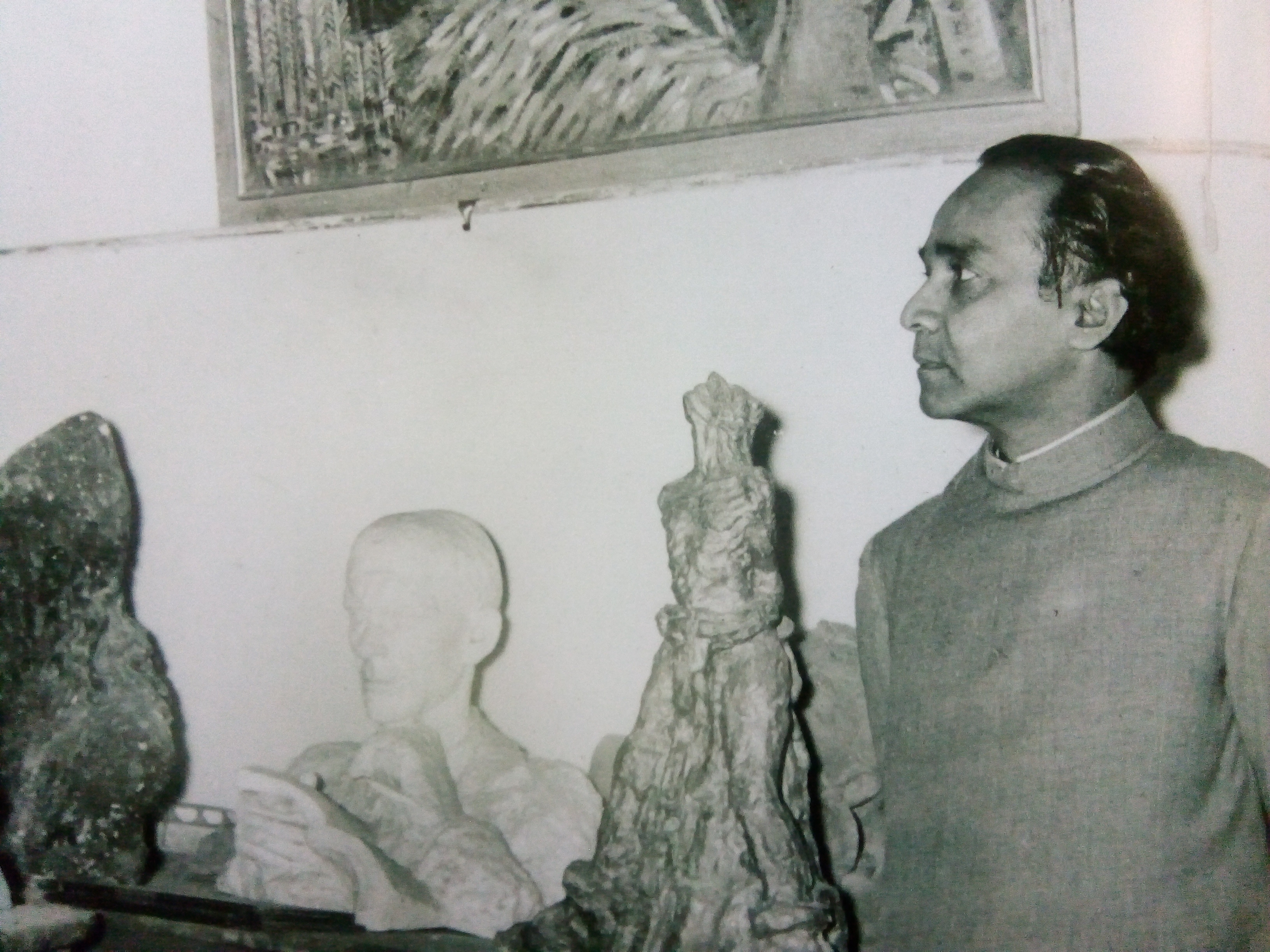
- Khastgir at The Doon School, where he was the first art teacher when it opened in 1935
- Born: 24 September 1907; Chittagong, Bengal Presidency, British India
- Died: 6 June 1974 (aged 66); Kolkata, West Bengal, India
- Known for: Painting
- Movement: Bengal school of art, modern Indian art

Sudhir Ranjan Khastgir (24 September 1907 – 6 June 1974) was an Indian painter of the Bengal school of art and an art educator. A pupil of Abanindranath Tagore and Nandalal Bose, Khastgir was known for his "Indian style" of painting. He graduated from Visva-Bharati University at Santiniketan in 1929. He was influenced by the Tagore family and his classic works include paintings of scenes from Indian mythologies, women, and village life. He was also the first art teacher at The Doon School, Dehradun, when it opened in 1935. Today, the many statues and murals on display at Doon, and frescoes of dancers at the entrance of a local cinema hall, The Orient, are his creations.

== Life and career ==
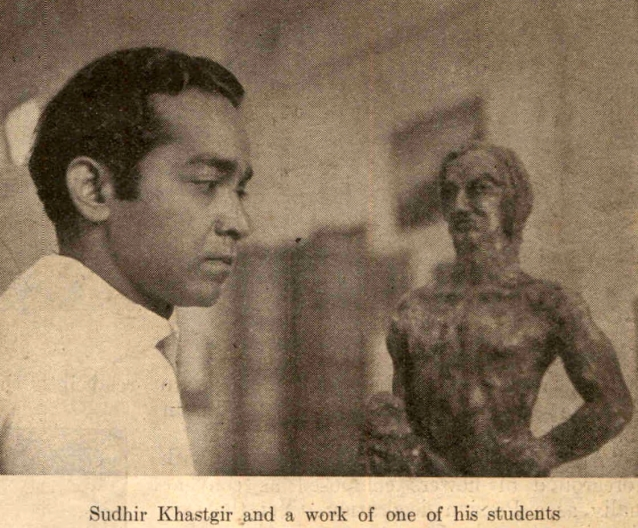

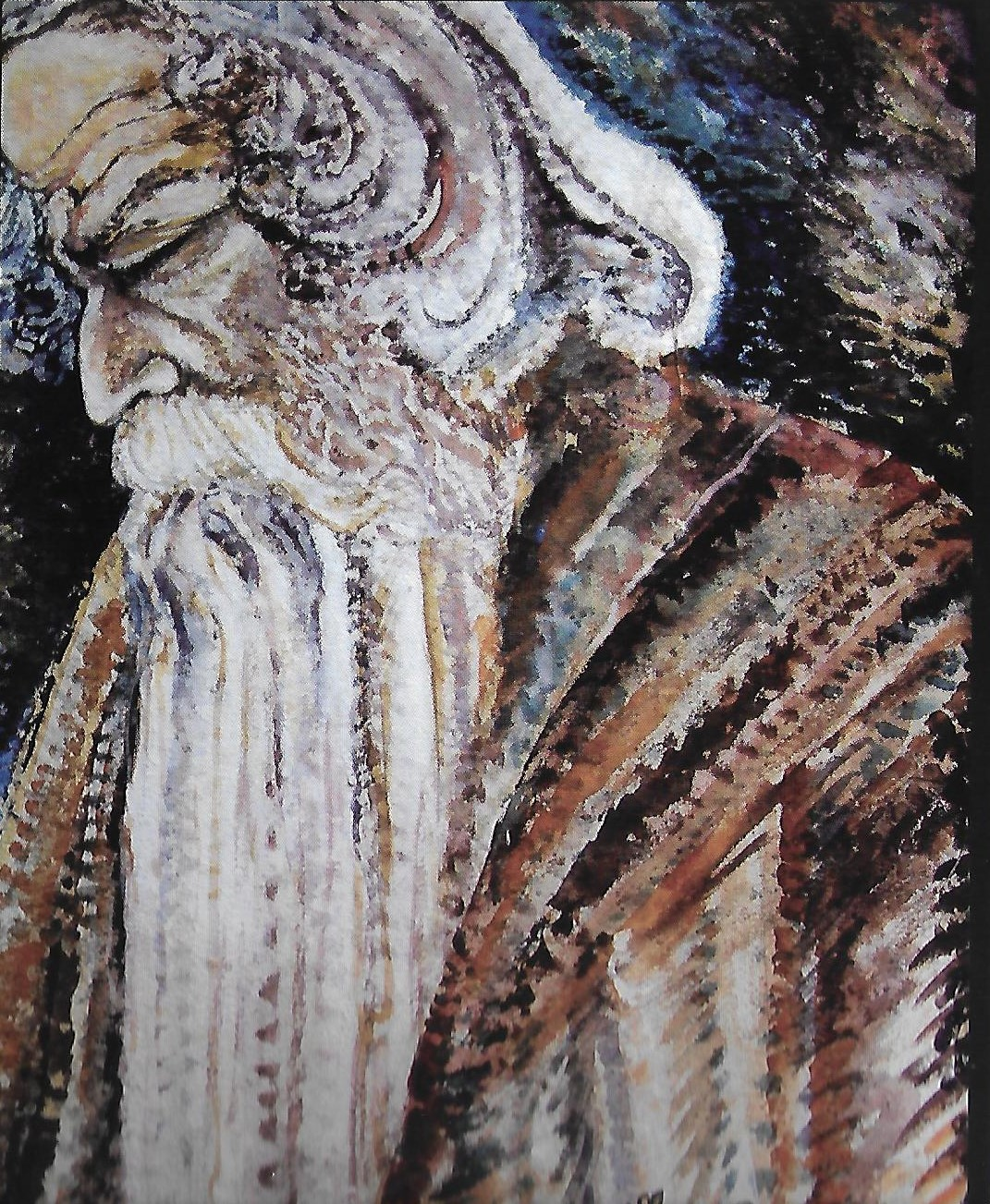
Tagore by Khastgir, depicting Rabindranath Tagore

Khastgir was born in Chittagong, Bangladesh in 1907. He soon moved to Kolkata, India for his schooling. After graduating from the Visva-Bharati University at Santiniketan, he went to Academy of Fine Arts, Munich to study Fine Arts on a scholarship. After returning from Munich, he became the first Arts master at the newly opened The Doon School. He remained in Doon for the next 20 years. During this period, he also directed some dance-dramas based on the works of Rabindranath Tagore.

While at Doon, he achieved considerable national fame and was invited by the Uttar Pradesh Government to head Lucknow College of Arts and Crafts, Lucknow (University of Lucknow) in 1956.

Khastgir was given the Padma Shri award by Government of India in 1957, for his significant contributions to Indian art.

== Family ==
His elder brother, Satish Ranjan Khastgir, was a noted physicist. His daughter, Shyamoli Khastgir, an environmental activist, lives in Purba Palli, Shantiniketan.
