= List of songs about cities =

Cities are a major topic for popular songs. Music journalist Nick Coleman said that apart from love, "pop is better on cities than anything else."

Popular music often treats cities positively, though sometimes they are portrayed as places of danger and temptation. In many cases, songs celebrate individual cities, presenting them as exciting and liberating. Not all genres share the tendency to be positive about cities; in Country music cities are often portrayed as unfriendly and dehumanizing, or seductive but full of sin. However, there are many exceptions, for example: Lady Antebellum's song "This City" and Danielle Bradbery's "Young in America".

Lyricist and author Sheila Davis writes that including a city in a song's title helps focus the song on the concrete and specific, which is both more appealing and more likely to lead to universal truth than abstract generalizations. Davis also says that songs with titles concerning cities and other specific places often have enduring popularity.

== Albania ==
=== Tirana ===
- "Shkupi, Tirana, Prishtina" by Adrian Gaxha
- "Tirona" by West Side Family

== Algeria ==
=== Algiers ===
- "Alger" by Jean Leloup
- "Alger Alger" by Lili Boniche
- "Bahdja Bida" by Dahmane El Harrachi
- "Broken Flag" by Patti Smith

=== Oran ===
- "Rouhi ya Wahrane" by Khaled

=== Tizi Ouzou ===
- "Tizi Ouzou" by Idir & Maxime Le Forestier
- "Idrar Inu" by Idir

== Armenia ==
=== Yerevan ===
- "No moles left in Irevan", by Jabbar Garyaghdioglu
- "Hey Jan Yerevan" by Willi Tokarev
- "Yerevan Jan" by Levon Malkhasyan

== Argentina ==
=== Buenos Aires ===
- "Anclao en París" by Enrique Cadícamo
- "Boskie Buenos" by Maanam
- "Buenos Aires sólo es piedra" by Alas
- "Buenos Aires" by Benjamin Biolay
- "Buenos Aires" by Iz*One
- "Buenos Aires" by Dom La Nena
- "Buenos Aires" by Fito Páez
- "Buenos Aires" by Tim Rice and Andrew Lloyd Webber
- "Buenos Aires" by Xoel López
- "Buenos Aires" by Rafa Pons
- "Cafetín de Buenos Aires" by Roberto Goyeneche
- "Cae el Sol" by Soda Stereo
- ”Ciudad Mágica” by Tan Bionica
- "Chiquilín de Bachín", tango by Ástor Piazzolla and Horacio Ferrer
- "En la Ciudad de la Furia" by Soda Stereo
- "Mañana en el Abasto" by Sumo
- "María de Buenos Aires" by Ástor Piazzolla
- "Mi Buenos Aires querido" by Carlos Gardel
- "No Bombardeen Buenos Aires" by Charly García
- "No Tan Buenos Aires" by Andrés Calamaro
- "Santa Maria (Del Buen Ayre)" by Gotan Project
- "Rapsodia Porteña" by Juan María Solare
- "Villa Crespo" by Juan María Solare
- "Villa Kreplaj" by Juan María Solare

=== Rosario ===
- "Tema de Piluso" by Fito Páez

=== Ushuaia ===
- "Anochecer en Ushuaia" by Juan María Solare

=== Córdoba ===
- "Soy Cordobés" by Rodrigo

=== Tucumán ===
- "Tucumán" by Mariano García

== Azerbaijan ==
=== Baku ===
- "Baku" by Tofig Guliyev
- "Baku" by VO5
- "Baku" by Muslim Magomayev
- "Baku" by Rashid Behbudov
- "Baku" by Iosif Kobzon
- "Mercy Baku" by DJ Smash

== Australia ==
=== Adelaide ===
- "Adelaide" by Ben Folds
- "Adelaide" by John Cale
- "Adelaide" by Paul Kelly
- "Adelaide" by Anberlin
- "Adelaide" by the Rockfords
- "Adelaide, You're Beautiful" by Judith Durham
- "Best Western" by Bad Astronaut
- "Came from Adelaide" by Coodabeen Champions
- "Charades" by Cog
- "City of Light" by Hilltop Hoods
- "Hindley Street" by Powderfinger
- "Home and Broken Hearted" by Cold Chisel
- "Howl at the Moon" by Don Walker
- "In South Australia I Was Born" by Greg Champion
- "Largs Pier Hotel" by Jimmy Barnes
- "Lost in Adelaide" by Spiderbait
- "Mr Bad Example" by Warren Zevon
- "Northern" by Bad Dreems
- "One More Boring Night in Adelaide" by Redgum
- "Sitting in a Bar in Adelaide" by Skyhooks
- "Town With No Cheer" by Tom Waits
- "Welcome to Adelaide" by Snog

=== Albury–Wodonga ===
- "Albury Wodonga" by Private Function

=== Alice Springs ===
- "46 Miles from Alice" by Catherine Britt
- "88k from Alice" by Greg Champion
- "A Town Like Alice" by Ted Egan
- "Alice" by Dick Diver
- "Alice Springs" by Coloured Stone
- "Alice Springs" by Liz Phair
- "Alice Springs" by Mystery Jets
- "Alice Springs" by John Williamson
- "Alice Springs Rodeo" by Ted Egan
- "Alice Springs Waltz" by Herbie Laughton
- "The Ghan to Alice Springs" by Buddy Williams
- "Such a Beautiful Thing" by Ian Moss
- "Warakurna" by Midnight Oil
- "When the Snow Falls on the Alice" by Lee Kernaghan

=== Ballarat ===
- "Ballarat" by the Lemonheads
- "Died in Ballarat" by Mick Thomas' Roving Commission

=== Bathurst ===
- "Australian Boy" by Lee Kernaghan
- "The Bathurst Rebellion" by Lionel Long
- "Bathurst to L.A." by Penny Davies and Roger Ilott
- "Boys from Bathurst" by Lee Kernaghan
- "Four Walls" by Cold Chisel

=== Bendigo ===
- "Bendigo" by Matt Taylor
- "Bendigo, Welcome Stranger" by Keith Glass
- "Bendigo Rock" by Russell Morris
- "Ghost of Bendigo" by the Terrys and Nooky
- "The Kid from Bendigo" by Reg Lindsay
- "Lady from Bendigo" by Eric Bogle
- "Shazza and Michelle" by ROOT!

=== Brisbane ===
- "Auchenflower" by David McCormack
- "The Battle of Brisbane" by the Pogues
- "Big Old Car" by Adam Brand, Cold Chisel
- "Brisbane" by the Wiggles
- "Brisbane '82" by John Kennedy
- "Brisbane, 1933" by the Gin Club
- "Brisbane City" by Joel Turner
- "Brisbane Girl" by Penny Davies and Roger Ilott
- "Brisbane Ladies" by The Bushwhackers
- "Brisbane Love Song" by Sun Kil Moon
- "Brisbane (Security City) by the Saints
- "Brisbane, The River City" by Robbie Dunn
- "Brisbane to Beechworth" by Matt Taylor
- "Brisvegas" by John Kennedy's 68 Comeback Special
- "The Brown Snake" by Thelma Plum
- "Buckin' Brisbane Broncos" by Jim Haynes
- "Caboolture Speed Lab" by Custard
- "Coming Home" by Sheppard
- "Conversation with a Brisbane Cab Driver" by Rob Snarski
- "Darkside" by Kev Carmody
- "Departures (Blue Toowong Skies)" by Bernard Fanning
- "Dreamworld" by Midnight Oil
- "The Ekka (Dagwood Dogs)" by Robbie Dunn
- "Fortitude Valley" by Mick Thomas
- "Fortitude Valley" by Wagons
- "Fri Night in Brisbane" by Robbie Dunn
- "The Goodbye Train" by the Apartments
- "Growing Up in Brisbane" by Riptides
- "Hills of Brisbane" by James Blundell
- "Hey Steven" by John Kennedy's Love Gone Wrong
- "Inferno (Brisbane in Summer)" by Robert Forster
- "I've Been Drunk in Every Pub in Brisbane" by the Chats
- "Living South of the Freeway" by Kev Carmody
- "London... Paris... Bracken Ridge!" by the Onyas
- "Meet Me in the Mall in Brisbane" by Judith Durham
- "Moreton Bay" by John Denver
- "No-one Loves Brisbane Like Jesus" by John Williamson
- "No Sleep 'til Brisbane" by the Amity Affliction
- "Nuclear Device (The Wizard of Aus)" by the Stranglers
- "Pig City" by Spiral Stairs
- "Pig City" by The Parameters
- "Queensland University" by Custard
- "Rosalie" by Gaslight Radio
- "See You Again" by Catfish
- "Snake Skin Lady" by Robert Forster
- "Spring Rain" by the Go-Betweens
- "Streets of Your Town" by The Go-Betweens
- "Thought I Was Over You" by Jack Frost
- "Trees of Brisbane" by Charles Jenkins

=== Broken Hill ===
- "Broken Hill" by Stephen Rowe
- "The Bus to Broken Hill" by John Dengate
- "Inside a Fireball" by Hunters & Collectors
- "Moving On" by Roaring Jack
- "Pickin' Up the Pieces" by Tania Kernaghan
- "Push a Wheelbarrow" by John Williamson
- "This Is Not the Way Home" by the Cruel Sea
- "Truthful Fella" by Slim Dusty

=== Cairns ===
- "Bye Bye Pride" by The Go-Betweens
- "Cairns" by Emma Russack
- "Cairns" by Mikey Young
- "Christmas in Cairns" by The Ten Tenors

=== Canberra ===
- "Australia's Canberra" by Judith Durham
- "Canberra's Calling to You" by Jack Lumsdaine
- "Canberra, We're Watching You" by Dalvanius and the Fascinations
- "Dickson" by Cosmic Psychos
- "Gough" by The Whitlams
- "Yarralumla Wine" by Redgum

=== Coffs Harbour ===
- "Coffs Harbour Blues" by Hard-Ons
- "Harry Was a Bad Bugger" by Tex, Don and Charlie
- "Russell Crowe's Band" by Frenzal Rhomb

=== Darwin ===
- "Aralia" by Leah Flanagan
- "Darwin" by Don Walker
- "Darwin (Big Heart Of The North)" by Slim Dusty
- "Darwin is da Winner" by Judith Durham
- "Darwin Jailhouse Window" by Tex Morton
- "Santa Never Made It into Darwin" by Bill and Boyd
- "She’s On Again in Darwin" by Ted Egan
- "Song for Darwin" by Ayers Rock
- "Tojo" by Hoodoo Gurus

=== Fremantle ===
- "The Catalpa" by the Real McKenzies
- "Shine" by the Scientists
- "South Fremantle" by Ashley Naylor

=== Gladstone ===
- "Gladstone Pier" by Redgum

=== Glenorchy ===
- "The Glenorchy Bunyip" by Augie March

=== Gold Coast ===
- "The Boys Light Up" by Australian Crawl
- "Elly" by Kev Carmody
- "Gold Coast" by Violent Soho
- "Gold Coast Man" by Dan Kelly
- "Over the Border" by Skyhooks
- "Runaway Bay" by Ghostwriters
- "Southport Morning Post" by Gaslight Radio
- "Southport Superman" by the Chats
- "Surfers Paradise the Musical" by Tripod
- "Tina from Robina" by Gaslight Radio

=== Hobart ===
- "Hobart Obit" by Augie March
- "Happy Years I Spent in Hobart" by Judith Durham

=== Kalgoorlie ===
- "Kalgoorlie" by Tim Rogers and the Temperance Union
- "Kalgoorlie" by The Peep Tempel
- "King of Kalgoorlie" by Slim Dusty
- "The Golden Mile" by Spy vs Spy

=== Launceston ===
- "Launceston" by Icecream Hands

=== Mackay ===
- "Good to Cry" by Robert Forster

=== Mount Isa ===
- "Back at the Isa" by John Williamson
- "Carless in Isa" by Don Walker
- "City of Mount Isa" by Slim Dusty
- "Isa Rodeo" by Slim Dusty
- "Only Road You Know" by Chris LeDoux

=== Newcastle ===
- "The Basha Polka" by the Porkers
- "Earthquakin'" by the Porkers
- "Newcastle Knights" by Morgan Evans
- "Newcastle Nights" by "Jim Haynes
- "The Newcastle Song" by Bob Hudson
- "Star Hotel" by Cold Chisel

=== Perth ===
- "Arsehole of the Universe" by The Scientists
- "I Love Perth" by Pavement
- "Jeremy Joy" by The Triffids
- "Perth" by Bon Iver
- "Perth" by Beirut
- "Perth Is a Culture Shock" by The Victims
- "Perth Girls" by Abbe May
- "Perth Traumatic Stress Disorder" by Alex Lahey
- "Sleepy Little Deathtoll Town" by The Panda Band
- "South Perth" by Bernie Hayes
- "When Perth Is on the East Side" by Judith Durham

=== Port Lincoln ===
- "Cool Hand Lukin" by Paul Kelly
- "Drinkin in Port Lincoln" by Cold Chisel

=== Port Macquarie ===
- "The Ballad Of Port Macquarie" by Slim Dusty

=== Queanbeyan ===
- "Queanbeyan" by Jack Lumsdaine

=== Rockhampton ===
- "Six Hours to Brisbane" by Halfway

=== Tamworth ===
- "Another Tinsel Town" by Rod McCormack
- "Big Trucks Are Rolling into Tamworth" by Greg Champion
- "Clouds Over Tamworth" by John Williamson
- "The Devil Went Down to Tamworth" by Pixie Jenkins
- "Everybody Knows Why Everybody Goes to Tamworth" by Smoky Dawson
- "Gotta Get Back to Tamworth" by Johnny Chester
- "Hello Tamworth" by Arthur Blanch
- "I Took My Trombone To Tamworth" by Ian McNamara
- "Joe Maguire's Pub" by Slim Dusty
- "Longyard On A Saturday Night" by Greg Champion
- "Making The Music In Tamworth" by Greg Champion
- "Tamworth" by Topp Twins
- "Tamworth (the song)" by Norma O'Hara Murphy
- "Tamworth the Great Country Star" by Stan Coster

=== Toowoomba ===
- "1990's" by Custard

=== Townsville ===
- "I Was Only Nineteen" by Redgum
- "Showtime" by Cold Chisel

=== Wangaratta ===
- "Wangaratta Gazza" by Peter Bibby
- "Wangaratta Wahine" by the Captain Matchbox Whoopee Band

=== Woolongong ===
- "Beachcomber from Wollongong" by John Williamson
- "Wollongong the Brave" by Aunty Jack

=== Whyalla ===
- "Whyalla" by Peter Bibby

== Austria ==
=== Friedberg ===
- "Friedberg" by Anna F.

=== Fürstenfeld ===
- Fürstenfeld by S.T.S.

=== Salzburg ===
- "Salzburg" by Worakls

=== Vienna ===
- "Ganz Wien" by Falco
- "Vienna Calling" by Falco
- "Wiener Blut" by Falco
- "Vienna" by Matt Costa
- "Vienna" by Billy Joel
- "Vienna" by Ultravox
- "Vienna" by The Fray
- "Wien, Wien nur du allein" by Fritz Wunderlich
- "Vienne" by Barbara
- "Dear Vienna" by Owl City
- "Visit to Vienna" by Sahara Hotnights
- "Take This Waltz" by Leonard Cohen
- "A Night in Vienna" by Opus

== Bahamas ==
=== Nassau ===
- "Funky Nassau" by The Beginning of the End
- "Sloop John B" by The Beach Boys

== Belarus ==
=== Minsk ===
- "Miensk i Minsk" by N.R.M.

== Belgium ==
=== Aalst ===
- "Aalst (stad mijner dromen)" by Raymond van het Groenewoud

=== Antwerp ===
- "Antwerpen" by Enter Shikari

=== Bruges ===
- "Le carillonneur de Bruges" by Lina Margy
- "Mon père disait" by Jacques Brel

=== Brussels ===
- "BX vibes" by Scylla
- "Brussel" by Johan Verminnen
- "Brussel" by Liesbeth List. Melody based on 'Bruxelles' by Jacques Brel.
- "Brussels by Night" by Raymond van het Groenewoud
- "Brussels Is on My Side" by Milow
- "Bruxelles" by Jacques Brel
- "Bruxelles" by Bénabar
- "Bruxelles" by Dick Annegarn
- "BruxellesVie" by Damso
- "Funky'n Brussels" by Lost Frequencies
- "Il pleut sur Bruxelles" by Dalida
- "In de Rue des Bouchers" by Johan Verminnen
- "Just like Belgium" by Elton John
- "Liège Bruxelles Gand" by Baloji
- "Manneken Pis" by Maurice Chevalier
- "Bruxelles" by Boulevard des airs
- "Bruxelles arrive" by Roméo Elvis featuring Caballero
- "Bruxelles je t'aime" by Angèle

=== Knokke ===
- "Knokke-le-Zoute Tango" by Jacques Brel
- "Jacky" by Jacques Brel

=== Liège ===
- "Il neige sur Liège" by Jacques Brel
- "Liège Bruxelles Gand" by Baloji

=== Limbourg ===
- "The Fat Lady of Limbourg" by Brian Eno

=== Ostende ===
- "Ostende" by Alain Bashung
- "Comme à Ostende" by Arno, Bernard Lavilliers
- "Met de trein naar Oostende" by Spring

=== Waterloo ===
- "Waterloo" by ABBA
- "Walking Back to Waterloo" by Bee Gees

== Bolivia ==
=== La Paz ===
- "Chuquiago Marka" by Los Kjarkas

== Bosnia & Herzegovina ==
=== Sarajevo ===
- "Christmas Eve/Sarajevo 12/24" by Savatage and Trans-Siberian Orchestra
- "Je l' Sarajevo gdje je nekad bilo" by Dino Merlin
- "Sarajevo" by Ekatarina Velika
- "Sarajevo" by Dino Merlin
- "Sarajevo" by Kultur Shock
- "Sarajevo ljubavi moja" by Kemal Monteno
- "Miss Sarajevo" by Bono
- "Primavera a Sarajevo" by Enrico Ruggeri
- "Anarhija All Over Baščaršija" by Zabranjeno Pušenje
- "Baščarši Hanumen" by Elvis J. Kurtović & His Meteors
- "Bosnia" by The Cranberries

=== Banja Luka ===
- "Moj grad" by Viteški ples
- "Banja Luko" by Emir Bašić
- "Banja Luko i ta tvoja sela" by various artists such as Milena Plavišić and Safet Isović
- "Banja Luka" by Osman Hadžić
- "Od kako je Banja Luka postala" by Safet Isović
- "Dobro veče Banja Luko" by Viteški ples
- "Banja Luka" by Halid Muslimović

=== Zenica ===
- "Zenica Blues" by Zabranjeno Pušenje

== Brazil ==
=== Brasília ===
- "A Ponte" by Lenine
- "Te Amo Brasília" by Alceu Valença

=== Fortaleza ===
- "As Velas do Mucuripe" by Fagner

=== Londrina ===
- "Londrina" by Arrigo Barnabé

=== Porto Alegre ===
- "Anoiteceu em Porto Alegre" by Engenheiros do Hawaii
- "Horizontes" by Kleiton & Kledir
- "Deu Pra Ti" by Kleiton & Kledir

=== Recife ===
- "Coração Bobo" by Alceu Valença
- "La Belle de Jour" by Alceu Valença
- "No Romper da Aurora" by Alceu Valença
- "Para um Amor no Recife" by Paulinho da Viola
- "Recife, minha cidade" by Reginaldo Rossi

=== Salvador ===
- "Na Baixa do Sapateiro" by Ary Barroso
- "We Are the World of Carnival" by Asa de Águia
- "Salvador" by Claudia Leitte

=== São Paulo ===
- "Avenida Paulista" by Rita Lee
- "Isto é São Paulo" by Demônios da Garoa
- "Não Existe Amor em SP" by Criolo
- "Rua Augusta" by Ronnie Cord
- "Sampa" by Caetano Veloso
- "São Paulo" by 365 (band)
- "São Paulo" by Chic
- "São Paulo" by Deadstring Brothers
- "São Paulo" by Flying Lotus
- "São Paulo" by Guillemots
- "São Paulo" by Inocentes
- "São Paulo" by Mallu Magalhães
- "São, São Paulo" by Tom Zé

== Canada ==
=== Calgary ===
- "Actually, I'm Just Wearing Your Glasses" by Empire! Empire! (I Was a Lonely Estate)
- "Calgary" by Bon Iver
- "calgary" by Tate McRae
- "Calgary Girls" by The Smith Street Band
- "Hippies in Calgary" by Chris LeDoux
- "I Will Follow You into the Dark" by Death Cab for Cutie

=== Gaspé ===
- "Canadian Railroad Trilogy" by Gordon Lightfoot

=== Halifax ===
- "Hello City" by Barenaked Ladies
- "Knockbacks in Halifax" by Weddings Parties Anything
- "Love This Town" by Joel Plaskett

=== Iqaluit ===
- "Iqaluit" by The Jerry Cans

=== Saskatoon ===
- "A Little bit South of Saskatoon" by Sonny James
- "Girl in Saskatoon" by Johnny Cash
- "I Left a Love Note on the Wall in Saskatoon" by Painted Thin
- "Runnin' Back To Saskatoon" by The Guess Who
- "Wheat Kings" by the Tragically Hip

=== Regina ===
- "Regina, I Don't Want to Fight" by Library Voices
- "The Last Saskatchewan Pirate" by The Arrogant Worms

=== Winnipeg ===
- "One Great City!" by The Weakerthans
- "Left and Leaving" by The Weakerthans
- "Civil Twilight" by The Weakerthans
- "Pamphleteer" by The Weakerthans
- "This Is a Fire Door Never Leave Open" by The Weakerthans
- "Heart of the Continent" by John K. Samson
- "Maryland Bridge" by John K. Samson
- "Prairie Town" by Randy Bachman, Neil Young, Margo Timmins.
- "Winnipeg Is a Frozen Shithole" by Venetian Snares
- "Winnipeg Sidestep" by Sherbert
- "All That I Know" by Winnipeg's Most
- "Winterpeg" by Cancer Bats
- "Exodus of the Year" by Royal Canoe

=== Sudbury ===
- "Sudbury Saturday Night" by Stompin' Tom Connors

== Chile ==
=== Santiago ===
- "Y Si No Fuera" by Chico Trujillo
- "Santiago" by Los Tetas
- "A mi ciudad" by Santiago del Nuevo Extremo

=== Valparaíso ===
- "Monte Cristo" by Indochine
- "Valparaíso" by Pauline Croze
- "Valparaíso" by Sting
- "Valparaíso" by Osvaldo Rodríguez
- "Valparaíso" by Dominique A

=== Puerto Montt ===
- "Puerto Montt" by Los Iracundos

== China ==
=== Beijing ===
- "Nine Million Bicycles" by Katie Melua
- "Indochine (Les 7 Jours de Pékin)" by Indochine
- "Beijing, Beijing" by Wang Feng
- "Beijing Story" by Cui Jian
- "Beijing" by Thaiboy Digital

=== Shanghai ===
- "夜上海" (Shanghai nights) by Zhou Xuan
- "Shangaï" by Indochine
- "Shanghai Breezes" by John Denver
- "Shanghai" by King Gizzard & the Lizard Wizard

== Congo, Democratic Republic of the ==
=== Kinshasa ===
- "Françafrique" by Tiken Jah Fakoly
- "Kinshasa" by Tabu Ley Rochereau

== Colombia ==
=== Barranquilla ===
- "En Barranquilla Me Quedo" by Joe Arroyo

=== Bogotá ===
- "Bajo el Sol de Bogotá" by León Gieco
- "Bogotá" by Criolo
- "Glamour Profession" by Steely Dan
- "Suéltame, Bogotá" by Diamante Eléctrico
- "Te Amo Bogotá" by The Mills

=== Buenaventura ===
- "Buenaventura y Caney" by Grupo Niche

=== Cali ===
- "Cali Pachanguero" by Grupo Niche
- "Oiga, Mire, Vea" by Orquesta Guayacán

=== Medellín ===
- "Listo Medellín" by Grupo Niche
- "Medellín" by Maluma
- "Medellalo" by Blessd

=== Santa Marta ===
- "Cumbiana" by Carlos Vives

=== Quibdó ===
- "De Donde Vengo Yo" by ChocQuibTown

== Croatia ==
=== Pula ===
- "Maja" by KUD Idijoti

=== Rijeka ===
- "Tarantella Fiumana" by Belfast Food
- "Sićaš li se lungo mare" by Vinko Coce
- "Riječko veče" by Ivo Robić
- "Rijeka" by Paraf
- "Riječke pičke" by Let 3

=== Sinj ===
- "Sinju Grade" by Drazen Zanko ft. Vinko Coce

=== Split ===
- "Cvit Mediterana" by Oliver Dragojević
- "Ispod sunca zlatnoga" by Oliver Dragojević
- "Oj, joj, vlaju moj" by Drazen Zanko, Thompson, Vuco
- "Marjane, Marjane" by Mišo Kovač
- "Marjane, Marjane" by Ivo Tijardović
- "Nima Splita do Splita" by Tereza Kesovija
- "Ništa kontra Splita" by Dino Dvornik
- "Splite moj" by Oliver Dragojević

=== Vinkovci ===
- "Dođi u Vinkovce" by Shorty ft. Miroslav Stivčić

=== Vukovar ===
- "Vukovar" by Nenad Bach ft. Klapa Sinj
- "Hiljadu poruka za sreću" by Del Arno Band

=== Zagreb ===
- "041" by Azra
- "Užas je moja furka" by Azra
- "Zagreb" by Električni Orgazam
- "Zagreb ima isti pozivni" by Parni Valjak

== Cuba ==
=== Guantánamo ===
- "Guantanamera" by Joseíto Fernández

=== Havana ===
- "Canto a La Habana" by Celia Cruz and Johnny Pacheco
- "Cuban Pete" by José Norman
- "De La Habana Hasta Aquí" by Celia Cruz
- "Havana" by Camila Cabello
- "Havana" by Kenny G
- "Habana" by Fito Páez
- "Habáname" by Carlos Varela
- "Hermosa Habana" by Los Zafiros
- "Habanization" by Raúl Paz
- "Habaneando" by X Alfonso
- "La flaca" by Jarabe de Palo
- "Havana Affair" by the Ramones

=== Santiago de Cuba ===
- "Iré a Santiago" by Ana Belén, lyrics by Federico García Lorca (in his book "Poet in New York")

== Czech Republic ==
=== Brno ===
- "Brno je zlatá loď" by Ivan Mládek

=== Český Těšín ===
- "Těšínská" by Jaromír Nohavica

=== Františkovy Lázně ===
- "Františkovy Lázně" by Mandrage

=== Hlásná Třebaň ===
- "Hlásná Třebáň" by Ivan Mládek

=== Karviná ===
- "Karviná" by Yo Yo Band

=== Kladno ===
- "Kladno" by Yo Yo Band

=== Lidice ===
- "Lidice" by Juan María Solare

=== Olomouc ===
- "Na hotelu v Olomouci" by Petr Hapka feat. Szidi Tobias

=== Ostrava ===
- "Ostrava černá" by Jaromír Nohavica
- "Ostravo" by Jaromír Nohavica

=== Prague ===
- "Planeta Praha" by Vladimír 518
- "Praha" by Pokáč
- "Praha" by Sto zvířat
- "Prague" by Rika Zaraï
- "Prague" by Muse
- "Pražákům těm je tu hej" by Pražský výběr
- "Pražskej démon" by Vítkovo kvarteto
- "Smrtka na pražskom orloji" by Elán
- "Stanice Jiřího z Poděbrad" by Jaromír Nohavica
- "The Song I Dreamt About Prague" by Arik Einstein

=== Slaný ===
- "Slaný" by Totální nasazení

=== Znojmo ===
- "Znojmo, vidím tě dvojmo" by Ivan Mládek

== Cyprus ==
- "Aphrodite" by Dawnstar

=== Limassol ===
- "Limassol" by Maxïmo Park

== Denmark ==
=== Holsterbro ===
- "En sød student fra Holsterbro" by Dorthe Kollo

=== Skanderborg ===
- "Gid du var i Skanderborg" by Dorthe Kollo

== Dominican Republic ==
=== San Pedro de Macorís ===
- "San Pedro de Macorís" by Juan Luis Guerra

=== Santo Domingo ===
- "Visa para un Sueño" by Juan Luis Guerra
- "Buscando al Caballo (Homenaje a Johnny Ventura)" by Carlos Vives feat. Milly Quezada and Jandy Ventura

== Ecuador ==
=== Guayaquil ===
- "Guayaquil City" by Mano Negra

== Egypt ==
=== Alexandria ===
- "Alexandrie" by Georges Moustaki
- "Alexandrie, Alexandra" by Claude François
- "شط إسكندرية / Shatt Iskindiriya" (The Beach of Alexandria) by Fairuz
- "Ya Iskindiriya" by Sheikh Imam

=== Cairo ===
- "Digitalism in Cairo" by Digitalism
- "Fire in Cairo" by The Cure
- "Night Boat to Cairo" by Madness
- "Road to Cairo" by David Ackles
- "Skies over Cairo" by Django Django
- "Al Qahira" by Amr Diab ft. Mohamed Mounir

== Finland ==
=== Helsinki ===
- "Haloo Helsinki" by Haloo Helsinki!
- "Helsinki" by Waltari
- (see also List of songs about Helsinki at Finnish Wikipedia)

== France ==
=== Ajaccio ===
- "Ajaccio" by Tino Rossi
- "D'ajaccio a Bonifacio" by Tino Rossi

=== Amiens ===
- "Amiens c'est aussi le tien" by Les Fatals Picards

=== Angers ===
- "Framboise" by Boby Lapointe

=== Annecy ===
- "Annecy" by Véronique Sanson

=== Avignon ===
- Sur le Pont d'Avignon (traditional)

=== Biarritz ===
- "Biarritz" by Luis Mariano
- "Roche" by Sebastien Tellier

=== Bordeaux ===
- "Bordeaux" by Durutti Column
- "Bordeaux" by Serge Lama

=== Brest ===
- "Brest" by Miossec
- "Recouvrance" by Miossec
- "A Recouvrance" by Marc Ogeret

=== Caen ===
- "Bermudes" by Fauve
- "Dans ma ville, on traîne" by Orelsan
- "2010" by Orelsan
- "Logo dans le ciel" by Orelsan
- "La gare de Caen" by Les Hurlements d'Léo

=== Calais ===
- "Dover–Calais" by Style

=== Cherbourg-Octeville ===
- "Cherbourg avait raison" by Frida Boccara
- "Les parapluies de Cherbourg" by Michel Legrand from The Umbrellas of Cherbourg
- "On attendra l'hiver" by Julien Doré
- "Cherbourg" by Beirut

=== Clermont-Ferrand ===
- "Quel temps fait-il à Clermont-Ferrand?" by Flying Tractors

=== Dijon ===
- "Dijon" by Yves Jamait

=== La Rochelle ===
- "La Ville de La Rochelle" by Tri Yann
- "Les Tours de La Rochelle" by Les Binuchards

=== Le Havre ===
- "Le Havre" by Péniche

=== Lille ===
- "Fille de Lille" by Balbino Medellin
- "Fleur de Lille" by Parov Stelar
- "Lille" by Lisa Hannigan

=== Lyon ===
- "Lyon Presqu'île" by Benjamin Biolay
- "Saint-Jean Croix-Rousse" by Zen Zila
- "Lyon-sur-Saône" by Bernard Lavilliers
- "Les Canuts" (Traditional) by Yves Montand

=== Marseille ===
- "Bad boys de Marseille" by Akhenaton
- "Coast of Marseille" by Jimmy Buffett
- "Dimanche aux goudes" by Massilia Sound System
- "Last Train to Marseilles" by Richard Clapton
- "Le temps que j'arrive à Marseille" by Claude François
- "Marseille" by Patrick Fiori
- "Marseille mon pays" by Tino Rossi
- "Marseille sans bateau" by Nicoletta
- "Marseilles" by The Angels
- "Schlaflos in Marseille" by Feine Sahne Fischfilet
- "Tais-toi Marseille" by Barbara

=== Montpellier ===
- "Montpellier" by Johnny Hallyday
- "Montpellier Sound System" by Stevo's Teen

=== Nancy ===
- "Nancy" by Oldelaf

=== Nantes ===
- "Nantes" by Barbara
- "Nantes" by Beirut
- "Dans les prisons de Nantes", traditional folk song covered by Tri Yann
- "Nantes" by Renan Luce
- "Sur le pont de Nantes" by Guy Béart
- "Sophie de Nantes" by Pigalle

=== Nice ===
- "Nissa La Bella" by Menica Rondelly
- "Nice, baie des anges" by Dick Rivers
- "Nice in Nice" by The Stranglers

=== Orléans ===
- "Maid of Orléans" by Dark Moor
- "Maid of Orléans" by Orchestral Manoeuvres in the Dark

=== Papeete ===
- "Southern Cross" by Crosby, Stills & Nash

=== Pau ===
- "Bèth cèu de Pau" by Marcel Amont

=== Reims ===
- "Reims" by Louis Garrel

=== Roubaix ===
- "Roubaix mon Amour" by Julien Doré

=== Rouen ===
- "Road to Rouen" by Supergrass

=== Saint-Étienne ===
- "Saint-Étienne" by Bernard Lavilliers

=== St. Tropez ===
- "Douliou-Douliou Saint-Tropez" by Geneviève Grad
- "Don't Play" by Halsey
- "Permanent Vacation" by Aerosmith
- "San Tropez" by Pink Floyd
- "Saint-Tropez" by Post Malone
- "Saint Tropez" by Ricky Martin
- "Tour de France" by Kraftwerk
- "Welcome to St. Tropez" by Timati

=== Strasbourg ===
- "Un dimanche à Strasbourg" by Les Wampas
- "Strasbourg" by The Rakes

=== Toulouse ===
- "Bis nach Toulouse" by Philipp Poisel
- "Toulouse" by Claude Nougaro
- "Toulouse" by Is Tropical
- "Toulouse" by Les Wampas
- "Toulouse" by Dutch DJ Nicky Romero
- "Toulouse" by Zebda
- "Goodbye Toulouse" by The Stranglers
- "Ma Ville Est le Plus Beau Parc" by Fabulous Trobadors

=== Vesoul ===
- "Vesoul" by Jacques Brel

== Germany ==
=== Bochum ===
- "Bochum" by Herbert Grönemeyer

=== Chemnitz ===
- "Karl-Marx-Stadt" by Kraftklub
- "Karl-Marx-Stadt" by Megapolis

=== Cologne ===
- "Am Bickendorfer Büdche" by Bläck Fööss
- "Am Dom zo Kölle, zu Kölle am Rhing" by Bläck Fööss
- "Dat Wasser vun Kölle" by Bläck Fööss
- "Du bess die Stadt" by Bläck Fööss
- "En De Weetschaff Op D'r Eck" by Bläck Fööss
- "En unserem Veedel" by Bläck Fööss
- "Et Südstadt Leed" by Bläck Fööss
- "Mer Losse d'R Dom in Kölle" by Bläck Fööss
- "Mir sin die Weltmeister vum Ring" by Bläck Fööss
- "Unser Stammbaum" by Bläck Fööss
- "Rut un wiess" by Bläck Fööss
- "Mir Kölsche" by Bläck Fööss
- "Lange Samstag En D'r City" by Bläck Fööss
- "Kölle Du Uns Stadt am Rhein" by Bläck Fööss
- "Kölsche Jung" by Brings
- "Köln Kalk Ehrenmord" by Eko Fresh
- "Ävver et Hätz bliev he in Kölle" by Höhner and Stefan Raab
- "Hey Kölle" by Höhner
- "Viva Colonia" by Höhner
- "Heimweh nach Köln" by Willi Ostermann
- "Köln hat was zu bieten" by Paveier
- "Stadt mit K" by Kasalla
- "Liebe deine Stadt" by Mo-Torres, Cat Ballou and Lukas Podolski
- "Et jitt kei Wood" by Cat Ballou
- "Du bes Kölle" by Tommy Engel
- "Mir han e Hätz für Kölle" by Bläck Fööss
- "Wenn mir Kölsche singe" by Bläck Fööss
- "Unser Jrundjesetz" by Bläck Fööss
- "Wo mir sin is Kölle" by Höhner
- "Mer stonn zo dir; FC Kölle-Hymne auf den 1. FC Köln" by Höhner
- "Dä kölsche Pass" by Höhner
- "Dat Hätz vun dr Welt" by Höhner
- "Halleluja" by Brings, Lukas Podolski
- "Bütze de Luxe" by Bläck Fööss
- "Sansi Bar" by Höhner
- "Ungerm Mond vun Kölle" by Brings
- "Kölsche Bröck" by Bläck Fööss
- "Kölsche Jung" by Willy Millowitsch
- "Das geht nie vorbei" by Höhner
- "Ming Stadt" by Cat Ballou
- "König" by Cat Ballou
- "Blootwoosch, Kölsch un e lecker Mädche" by Höhner
- "Mem Müllemer Böötchen" by Bläck Fööss
- "Kölle, du bes bunt" by Brings
- "Jeck Yeah!" by Brings
- "Köln ist einfach korrekt" by Wise Guys
- "Weil ich ein Kölner bin" by Wise Guys
- "Caminata nocturna (por Colonia)" by Juan María Solare
- "Schäl Sick" by Bläck Fööss

=== Delmenhorst ===
- "Delmenhorst" by Element of Crime

=== Döbeln ===
- "Döbeln in the Sky" by Dekadance

=== Dresden ===
- "Dresden" by Cold Chisel
- "Dresden" by Stuart Davis
- "Dresden" by The Slow Show
- "Dressed in Dresden" by The Hundred in the Hands

=== Düsseldorf ===
- "Altbierlied" by Die Toten Hosen
- "Düsseldorf" by Regina Spektor
- "Düsseldorf" by Broilers
- "Düsseldorf" by Teleman
- "Düsseldorf" by Bob Hund
- "Dusseldorf" by Little Heroes
- "La Düsseldorf" by La Düsseldorf
- "Meine Stadt" by Die Toten Hosen
- "Modestadt Düsseldorf" by Die Toten Hosen
- "Springtime for Hitler" by Mel Brooks
- "Wärst du doch in Düsseldorf geblieben" by Dorthe Kollo
- "Wir sind Düsseldorfer Jungs" by Die Mimmi's
- "Untitled in Dusseldorf (Demo)" by Stereolab

=== Erlangen ===
- "Wissenswertes über Erlangen" by Foyer des Arts

=== Frankfurt ===
- "Here Comes a City" by The Go-Betweens
- "Smog in Frankfurt" by Michael Holm
- "Winter in Frankfurt" by (Vega)

=== Frankfurt (Oder) ===
- "Frankfurt Oder" by Bosse feat. Anna Loos

=== Gelsenkirchen ===
- "Gelsenkirchen" by Georg Kreisler

=== Göttingen ===
- "Göttingen" by Barbara

=== Hameln ===
- "Pongamos que hablo de Hamelín" by Juan María Solare

=== Hamm ===
- "Hamm, Sweet Hamm" by Der Obel

=== Hanover ===
- "Stadt mit Keks" by Matthias Brodowy

=== Heidelberg ===
- "I Lost my Heart in Heidelberg"
- "Heidelberg" by Kakkmaddafakka
- "Memories of Heidelberg" by Peggy March
- "Passacaglia über HEIDELBERG" by Juan María Solare
- "Wunderschön" by Torch

=== Heiligenstadt ===
- "Heiligenstadt oder der Rand des Abgrunds" by Juan María Solare

=== Kassel ===
- "Direkt aus Kassel" by Cheech & Iakone

=== Königswinter ===
- "Es war in Königswinter" by Die 3 Colonias

=== Krefeld ===
- "Krefeld am Rhein" by Hörzu

=== Leipzig ===
- "Leipzig" by Matthew Herbert
- "Leipzig" by Balthazar
- "Leipzig" by Svavar Knútur
- "Leipzig" by Lot
- "Leipzig steht in Flammen" by Morlockk Dilemma
- "Live in Leipzig" by The Baboon Show
- "Zu Leipzig auf der Messe" by Kraudn Sepp
- "Leipziger Stilleben" by Sebastian Krämer
- "Der Schnorrerpark bei Leipzig" by Die Bockwurschtbude
- "Leipzig" by Thomas Dolby
- "Leipzig Song" by Sebastian Krumbiegel, GewandhausChor, GewandhausKinderchor
- "Leipzig in Trümmern" by Wutanfall

=== Ludwigshafen ===
- "Gerne in Lu'" by Ulrich Zehfuß

=== Mannheim ===
- "Meine Stadt" by Söhne Mannheims

=== München ===
- "München" by Spider Murphy Gang
- "Schickeria" by Spider Murphy Gang
- "Skandal im Sperrbezirk" by Spider Murphy Gang
- "Munich" by Editors
- "Via Munich" by Tony Sly
- "MÜNCHEN" by Luca-Dante Spadafora and Tream & treamiboii

=== Nürnberg ===
- "Nürnberg" by Hoelderlin
- "Nürnberg" by Herr Nilsson

=== Oberhausen (Rheinland) ===
- "Oberhausen" by Missfits

=== Rostock ===
- "Mein Rostock" by Marteria

=== Stuttgart ===
- "1ste Liebe" by Max Herre
- "Mutterstadt" by Massive Töne
- "Killesberg Baby" by Thomas D
- "Stuttgart Kommt" by Wolle Kriwanek

=== Westerland ===
- "Westerland" by Die Ärzte

=== Wolfenbüttel ===
- "Wolfenbüttel" by Bonaparte

== Guinea-Bissau ==
=== Bissau ===
- "Sol Maior Para Comanda" by Super Mama Djombo

== Greece ==
=== Athens ===
- "Keine Sterne in Athen (3-4-5 × in 1 Monat)" by Stephan Remmler
- "Weiße Rosen aus Athen / The White Rose of Athen" by Nana Mouskouri
- "Athina mana mou" by Bessy Argyraki
- "Athina mou" by Konstantinos Argyros

=== Mykonos ===
- "Mykonos" by Fleet Foxes

=== Piraeus ===
- "Never on Sunday" by Manos Hatzidakis

=== Thessaloniki ===
- "Sti Thessaloniki" by Kelly Kelekidou
- "Thessaloniki Mou" by Stelios Kazantzidis
- "S'anazito sti Saloniki" by Dimitris Mitropanos
- "Thessaloniki" by Dimitris Mitropanos
- "Geia Sou Mana Thessaloniki" by Zafeiris Melas
- "Thessaloniki Mou" by Giannis Parios
- "Fysa Vardari Mou" by Glykeria
- "Dikaioma mou" by Pashalis Terzis
- "Ta Ladadika" by Dimitris Mitropanos
- "Sto Lefko Ton Pyrgo" by Giorgos Zambetas

== Hong Kong ==
=== Hong Kong ===
- "Hong Kong" by Gorillaz
- "Hong Kong" by Ganymede
- "Hong Kong" by Kōji Tamaki
- "Hong Kong" by Andrés Calamaro and C. Tangana
- "Hong Kong" by the Weeknd
- "香港地" by Edison Chen
- "香港‧香港" by Agnes Chan
- "香港之夜" by Teresa Teng
- "Hong Kong Kowloon" by 24Herbs
- "Below the Lion Rock" by Roman Tam
- "Ghost Ship" by Blur
- "Hong Kong Star" by France Gall
- "Island" by Tang Siu Hau

== Hungary ==
=== Budapest ===
- "Budapest" by Pannonia Allstars Ska Orchestra
- "Budapest" by Jethro Tull
- "Budapest" by George Ezra
- "Hello Tourist" by Emil.RuleZ!
- "Jó éjt Budapest" by Katalin Karády

== Iceland ==
=== Reykjavík ===
- "Reykjavík" by Masha i Medvedi
- "Reykjavík" by Sykur
- "Reykjavík" by Els Amics de les Arts
- "Reykjavík" by Juno Mak

=== Husavik ===
- "Husavik" by My Marianne

== Iran ==
=== Isfahan ===
- "Isfahan" by Duke Ellington
- "Isfahan" by Moein

== Iraq ==
=== Babylon ===
- "Rivers of Babylon" by The Melodians

=== Baghdad ===
- "Je M'Appelle Bagdad" by Tina Arena
- "L'Uomo Di Bagdad, Il Cow Boy E Lo Zar" by Adriano Celentano
- "B.O.B. (Bombs over Baghdad)" by Outkast
- "Sadr City" by Corb Lund

== Ireland ==
=== Galway ===
- "Galway Girl" by Ed Sheeran

=== Tipperary ===
- "It's A Long Way To Tipperary" by Jack Judge

== Israel/Palestine ==
=== Bethlehem ===
- "O Little Town of Bethlehem" by Phillips Brooks

== India ==
=== Agra ===
- "Agre Ka Lala Angreji Dulhan Laya Re" by Asha Bhosle, Usha Mangeshkar
- "Agre Ko Ghaagre Mangwa De Raja" by Lata Mangeshkar
- "Tum Dilli Main Agre Mere Dil Se Nikle Haaye" by Mohammed Rafi
- "Ghagra" by Vishal Dadlani, Rekha Bhardwaj

=== Ahmedabad ===
- "Amdavad Re" by Vishal Dadlani
- "Awesome Amdavad" by Mehul Surti, Osman Mir, Dhvanit Thaker, & Mirande Shah
- "Eke Lal Darwaje" by Harshida Raval
- "Mijaj Amdavadi" by Hiral Brahmbatt, Arvind Vegda, Ganshyam Gadhvi, Nisarg Trivedi
- "Hoo Amdavad No Rickshaa Walo" by Kishore Kumar

=== Amritsar ===
- "Ambarsariya" by Sona Mohapatra
- "Gallan Goodiyaan" by Shankar Mahadevan, Yashita Sharma, Manish Kumar Tipu, Farhan Akhtar, Sukhwinder Singh
- "Main Amritsar" by Nachhatar Gill
- "Main Nikla Gaddi Leke" by Udit Narayan
- "Munda Ambarsariya" by Pavneet Birgi

=== Badrinath ===
- "Omkareshwari" by Shankar Mahadevan, M. M. Keeravani

=== Bareilly ===
- "Aaja Nachle" by Sunidhi Chauhan
- "Jhumka Gira Re" by Asha Bhosle
- "Kajra Mohabbat Wala" by Asha Bhosle, Shamshad Begum
- "Sweety Tera Drama" by Dev Negi, Pawni Pandey, Shraddha Pandit
- "Thoda Sa Pagla" by Asha Bhosle
- "Woh To Baan Bareilly Se Aaya" by Jayshree

=== Bengaluru ===
- "Ayyayyayyo Hallimukka" by L. R. Eswari
- "Bengalooru Mangalooru" by Puneeth Rajkumar
- "Nam Ooru Bengaluru" by Gopi Sunder, Bryan Adams
- "Ringa Ringa" by Priya Himesh

=== Bikaner ===
- "Ayi Ayi Malaniya Bikaner Se" by Sudha Malhotra
- "Bikaner Ki Chunari Odhi Lahanga Pahna Jaipur Ka" by Asha Bhosle
- "Mai Hu Jaipur Ki Banjaran" by Mohammed Rafi, Lalita Devulkar
- "Mera naam hai Chameli" by Lata Mangeshkar

=== Bhopal ===
- "Thoda Sa Pagla" by Asha Bhosle
- "Swachhata ki Rajdhani" by Shaan, Rishiking
- "Mera Bhopal" by Shaan
- "Bhopal" by Shaan, Rishiking, Javed Ali and Payal Dev

=== Chandigarh ===
- "Chandigarh" by Mankirt Aulakh
- "Chandigarh" by Raj Brar
- "Chandigarh Bouli Paendi" by Babbu Maan
- "Chandigarh Kare Aashiqui" by Jassi Sidhu
- "Chandigarh Rehn Waaliye" by Jenny Johal, Raftaar & Bunty Bains
- "Chandigarh Returns" by Ranjit Bawa
- "Chandigarh Waliye" by Sharry Mann
- "Dhaakad" by Raftaar
- "Kala Chashma" by Amar Arshi, Badshah, Neha Kakkar
- "Mohali" by Vinaypal Buttar
- "Poplin" by Diljit Dosanjh
- "Shehar Chandigarh Diyan Kudiyan" by Ammy Virk
- "Yaari Chandigarh Waliye" by Ranjit Bawa

=== Chennai ===
- "Bombay Ho Ya Madras" by S. P. Balasubrahmanyam
- "Chancey Illa" by Anirudh Ravichander
- "Chennai City Gangsta" by Anirudh Ravichander, Hard Kaur, Hiphop Tamizha, Country Chicken
- "Chennai Express" by S. P. Balasubrahmanyam, Jonita Gandhi
- "Madras" by Hariharasudhan, Meenakshi Iyer
- "Madras Dhost" by Krishnaraj, Anuradha Sriram and Naveen
- "Madras Nalla Madras" by T. M. Soundararajan
- "Madrasai Suthi" by Shahul Hameed, Swarnalatha, G. V. Prakash and Manorama
- "Main Bangali Chhokra, Main Madrasi Chhokri" by Mohammed Rafi and Asha Bhosle
- "Pattanathae Parka" by P. A. Periyanayaki
- "Porambokku Paadal" by T. M. Krishna
- "Spirit of Chennai" by C. Girinandh and Vikram featuring various artists
- "Sun Sun Madrasi Chhori " by Mohammed Rafi and Asha Bhosle
- "The Madras Song" by Shakthisree Gopalan

=== Dehradun ===
- "Mere Piya Gaye Rangoon" by Chitalkar Ramchandra, Shamshad Begum

=== Delhi ===
- "Bogi Bogi Bogi Yo Yo Yo" by G. M. Durrani and Shamshad Begum
- "Bombay Ho Ya Madras" by S. P. Balasubrahmanyam
- "Chalo Dilli" by Raja Hasan
- "Chor Bazaari" by Neeraj Shridhar and Sunidhi Chauhan
- "Delhi-6" by Blaaze, Benny Dayal, Tanvi Shah, Vivian Chaix, Claire
- "Delhi.com" by Mychael Danna
- "Delhi Destiny" by Raja Hassan
- "Delhi Shahar Mein Maro Ghaghro" by Ila Arun
- "Dhaakad" by Raftaar
- "Dil Jawani Ke Nashe Se Choor Hai" by Mohammed Rafi
- "Dil Ka Rishta Jod Diya Hai" by Kishore Kumar, Asha Bhosle
- "Dilli" by Rabbi Shergill
- "Dilli" by Tochi Raina, Shriram Iyer, Aditi Singh Sharma
- "Dilli Ke Baazar Ki Balma Sair Kara De" by Asha Bhosle
- "Dilli Ki Sardi" by Shweta Shetty, K.K.
- "Dilli Sara" by Kamal Khan and Kuwar Virk
- "Dilli Shehar" by Yash Kumar and Millind Gaba
- "Dilli Shehar Mein" by Ankit Singh and Antara Mitra
- "Dilli Shehar Diyan Kudhiyan" by Surinder Shinda
- "Dilli Tere Kile Par" by Suraiya
- "Dilliwaali Girlfriend" by Arijit Singh, Sunidhi Chauhan
- "Dilliwale Bure Nahi" by Shamshad Begum
- "Kajra Mohabbat Wala" by Asha Bhosle, Shamshad Begum
- "Kajra Re" by Alisha Chinoy, Shankar Mahadevan, Javed Ali and Amitabh Bachchan
- "Mehbooba" by Lata Mangeshkar, Vinod Rathod
- "Mithai Ki Dukan Meri Dilli Ke Bazaar" by Geeta Dutt
- "New Delhi Freight Train" by Little Feat
- "O Lilli Lilli Lilli" by Balbir and Geeta Dutt
- "Resham ka Rumal" by Ila Arun
- "Saddi Dilli" by Millind Gaba
- "Sanam Tu Chal Diya Rasta" by Mohammed Rafi
- "Sher Se Ladne Aayi Dekho" by Mohammed Rafi
- "Thoda Sa Pagla" by Asha Bhosle
- "Tum Dilli Main Agre Mere Dil Se Nikle Haaye" by Mohammed Rafi
- "Zaalim Dilli" by Jazzy B, Hard Kaur
- "Zameen Bhi Wohi Hai Wohi Aasmaan" by Mohammed Rafi
- "New Delhi" by Madness

=== Goa ===
- "Abhi Abhi Mere Dil Mein" by Kunal Ganjawala, Sunidhi Chauhan
- "Goa" by Krish, Ranjith, Tanvi Shah, Suchitra, Chynk Showtyme & Pav Bundy
- "Rocking Goa" by Shankar Ehsaan Loy

=== Hyderabad ===
- "Poochh Rahi Hai Ladki Hyderabadi" by Alka Yagnik

=== Indore ===
- "Ho Halla" by Shaan, Rishiking
- "Hai Halla" by Shaan, Rishiking and Payal Dev
- "Hattrick" by Shaan, Rishiking and Jubin Nautiyal
- "Chauka" by Shankar Mahadevan, Rishiking
- "Jeetega Indore" by Shaan and Devendra Malviya 'dev'
- "Swachhata ka Punch" by Shaan, June Banerjee and Devendra Malviya 'dev'
- "Halla Bol" by Sonu Nigam, Rishiking

=== Jaipur ===
- "Bikaner Ki Chunari Odhi Lahanga Pahna Jaipur Ka" by Asha Bhosle
- "Gulabi" by Jigar Sariya, Priya Saraiya
- "Jaipur Ki Choli" by Kishore Kumar, Asha Bhosle
- "Main Jaipur Ki Hoon Chhori" by Anuradha Paudwal
- "Mai Hu Jaipur Ki Banjaran" by Mohammed Rafi, Lalita Devulkar
- "Riding into Jaipur" by Paul McCartney

=== Jalandhar ===
- "Call Jalandhar Ton" by Harbhajan Mann
- "Iski Uski" by Akriti Kakkar, Shahid Mallya, Shankar Mahadevan

=== Kanpur ===
- "Kanpoora" by Indian Ocean

=== Kanyakumari ===
- "Bharatha Bhooshira" by S. Janaki

=== Kolkata ===
- "Aami Shotti Bolchi" by Usha Uthup, Vishwesh Krishnamurthy
- "Amar Shawhore" by Anupam Roy
- "Ami Kolkatar Rashogolla" by Kavita Krishnamurti
- "Ami Miss Calcutta" by Arati Mukhopadhyay
- "Balam Calcutta Pahunch Gaye" by Asha Bhosle, Usha Mangeshkar
- "Bogi Bogi Bogi Yo Yo Yo" by G. M. Durrani and Shamshad Begum
- "Bombay Ho Ya Madras" by S. P. Balasubrahmanyam
- "C/o. Kolkata" by Usha Uthup
- "Calcutta" by Bing Crosby, Rosemary Clooney
- "Calcutta" by Lawrence Welk
- "Calcutta Kiss" by Imaad Shah, Saba Azad
- "Calcutta Pan Vesina" by Shankar Mahadevan and K. S. Chithra
- "Calcutta (Taxi Taxi Taxi)" by Dr. Bombay
- "Chahiye Thoda Pyar" by Kishore Kumar
- "Chalo Calcutta" by Bappi Lahiri and Sharon Prabhakar
- "Kashi Hile Patna Hile Kalkatta Hile La" by Manna Dey
- "Kolkata" by Anupam Roy and Shreya Ghoshal
- "Kolkata Te Bati Nai" by Usha Uthup
- "Kolkata Kolkata" by Usha Uthup
- "Laga Nazariya Ka Dhakka" by Udit Narayan and Alka Yagnik
- "Na Champa Na Chameli" by Mamta Sharma
- "Oh, Calcutta!" by Dave Pell Singers
- "Shahron Mein Se" by Kishore Kumar
- "Sher Se Ladne Aayi Dekho" by Mohammed Rafi
- "Suno Ji Yeh Kalkatta Hai" by Mohammed Rafi from Howrah Bridge (film), music by O. P. Nayyar
- "Suno Suno Miss Chatterjee, Mere Dil Ka Matter Ji" by Mohammed Rafi and Asha Bhosle
- "Tomake Chai" by Suman Chatterjee
- "Yamaha Nagari" written by Veturi with the vocals of Hariharan.

=== Lucknow ===
- "Aye Shehar-E-Lucknow Tujhe" by Mohammed Rafi
- "Bullett Raja" by Keerthi Sagathia
- "In Ankhon Ki Masti Ke" by Asha Bhosle
- "Lucknow Chalo Ab Rani" by Geeta Dutt, G. M. Durrani
- "Suno Na Sangemarmar" by Arijit Singh
- "Thoda Sa Pagla" by Asha Bhosle
- "Yeh Lucknow Ki Sar Zameen" by Mohammed Rafi

=== Ludhiana ===
- "Naam Mera Nimmo Muqaam Ludhiana" by Lata Mangeshkar and Manna Dey

=== Mumbai ===
- "Aa Mumbai Chhe" by Manna Dey
- "Ai Dil Hai Mushkil Jeena Yahaan" by Mohammed Rafi and Geeta Dutt
- "Are Dekh Li Teri Bombai" by Kishore Kumar
- "Apna Bombay Talkies" by an ensemble cast including Udit Narayan and Alka Yagnik
- "Babu Samjho Ishare" by Kishore Kumar and Manna Dey
- "Bam Bam Bambai" by Amit Kumar
- "Bambai Humari Bambai" by Mohammed Rafi
- "Bambai Ne Paida Kiya" by Kishore Kumar
- "Bambai Se Aaya Mera Dost" by Bappi Lahiri
- "Bambai Se Gayi Poona" by Alka Yagnik
- "Bambai Shaam Ke Baad" by Asha Bhosle
- "Bambai Shahar Ki Tujko Chal Sair Kara Doon" by Kishore Kumar
- "Bom Bom Bombay Meri Hai" by Amit Kumar
- "Bombay" by Golden Earring
- "Bombay Ho Ya Madras" by S. P. Balasubrahmanyam
- "Bombay Ponnu" by Mamta Sharma
- "Bombay Purani Kalkatta Purana" by and Mohammed Rafi and Kamal Barot
- "Bombay Talkies (Duet)" by Kailash Kher, Richa Sharma
- "Bombay Theme" by A.R. Rahman
- "Bombs Away" by The Police
- "Bumbai Nagariya" by Bappi Lahiri, Vishal Dadlani, Nana Patekar, John Abraham
- "Chinchpokli Chinchpokli" by Shamshad Begum and Madan Mohan
- "Chuk Chuk Chak Chak Bombay Se Baroda Tak" by Usha Mangeshkar, Asha Bhosle, Mahesh Kumar
- "Dekhne Mein Bhola Hai" by Asha Bhosle
- "Dilliwale Bure Nahi" by Shamshad Begum
- "Ek Akela Is Shahar Mein" by Bhupinder Singh
- "Exotic" by Priyanka Chopra and Pitbull
- "Hawaii-Bombay" by Mecano
- "I Am Mumbai" by Javed Jaffrey
- "Lucknow Chalo Ab Rani" by Geeta Dutt, G. M. Durrani
- "Main Bombay Ka Babu" by Mohammed Rafi
- "Mumbai Ni Kamani" by Kishore Kumar
- "Mumbai Roke To Roke" by Kishore Kumar, Asha Bhosle
- "Mumbai One Way Nagari Hai" by Sukhwinder Singh, Ranjit Barot
- "Seene Mein Jalan, Aankhon Mein Toofaan" by Suresh Wadkar
- "Shake My Kamariya" by Mamta Sharma
- "Singh Is Kinng" by Snoop Dogg, RDB, Akshay Kumar
- "Sympathy for the Devil" by The Rolling Stones
- "Tumse Jo Dekhte Hi Pyar Hua" by S. P. Balasubrahmanyam, Lata Mangeshkar
- "Ye Haseen Bambai Apne Ko To Jam Gayi" by Mahendra Kapoor, Mukesh
- "Yeh Bombai Shehar Ka Bada Naam Hai" by Mohammed Rafi
- "Yeh Bombay Shahar Hai" by Amit Kumar
- "Yeh Hai Bambai Nagariya" by Kishore Kumar
- "Yeh Hai Mumbai" by Sudesh Bhosle

=== Patiala ===
- "Laung Da Lashkara" by Jasbir Jassi, Mahalakshmi Iyer, Hard Kaur
- "Patiala Peg" by Diljit Dosanjh
- "Suit Patiala" by Ginni Mahi

=== Patna ===
- "Kashi Hile Patna Hile Kalkatta Hile La" by Manna Dey
- "Patna Ke Haat Par Nariyar" by Kavita Paudwal
- "Patna Wali" by Amit Kumar, Vinod Ralhora

=== Pune ===
- "Bambai Se Gayi Poona" by Alka Yagnik
- "Poona Se Laayi Main Paan Re" by Tanveer Naqvi, Rajjan, Hasrat Lakhnavi and Swami Ramanand Saraswati

=== Raipur ===
- "Sasural Genda Phool" by Rekha Bhardwaj, Shraddha Pandit, Sujata Mazumder, Mahathi
- "Mor Raipur" by Javed Ali, Rishiking

=== Vadodara ===
- "Chuk Chuk Chak Chak Bombay Se Baroda Tak" by Usha Mangeshkar, Asha Bhosle, Mahesh Kumar

=== Varanasi ===
- "Hum To Aise Hain" by Sunidhi Chauhan, Shreya Ghoshal, Swanand Kirkire & Pranab Biswas
- "Kaisa Jadoo Dala Ma Benarasi Roomalwaala" by Mohammed Rafi and Asha Bhosle
- "Khaike Pan Banaraswala" by Kishore Kumar
- "Purab Se" by Shreya Ghoshal
- "Resham ka Rumal" by Ila Arun
- "Thoda Sa Pagla" by Asha Bhosle
- "Yeh Hai Shaan Banaras Ki" by Pt. Sanjeev Abhyankar
- "Bham Bham Bole" by Hariharan, Shankar Mahadevan

=== Vrindavan ===
- "Brindavan Ka Krishan Kanhaiya" by Mohammed Rafi, Lata Mangeshkar

== Italy ==
=== Bologna ===
- "Bologna" by Francesco Guccini
- "Bologna" by Wanda

=== Genoa ===
- "Genova per noi" by Paolo Conte
- "Ma se ghe pensu" by Bruno Lauzi
- "Bocca di Rosa" by Fabrizio de André
- "Mi canto Zena" by Franca Lai
- "Chi guarda Genova" by Ivano Fossati
- "Via del campo" by Fabrizio de André
- "Creuza de mä" by Fabrizio de André

=== Milan ===
- "Il Ragazzo della Via Gluck" by Adriano Celentano
- "Innamorati a Milano" by Memo Remigi
- "Luci a San Siro" by Roberto Vecchioni
- "Milano" by Ivano Fossati
- "Milano" by Lucio Dalla
- "Milano" by Alex Britti
- "Milano" by Edda
- "Milano 1968" by Le Orme
- "Milano circonvallazione esterna" by Afterhours
- "Milano e Vincenzo" by Alberto Fortis
- "Milano, Milano" by Articolo 31
- "Porta Romana" by Giorgio Gaber
- "Un romantico a Milano" by Baustelle
- "Milano" by Francesco Guccini
- "Nostalgia de Milan" by Giovanni D'Anzi
- "Nati a Milano" by Giorgio Faletti
- "Amo Milano" by Dargen D'Amico
- "Milano" by Calcutta
- "Mílanó" by Sigur Rós
- "Milano" by Russian Circles

=== Modena ===
- "Le donne di Modena" by Francesco Baccini
- "Modena" by Antonello Venditti

=== Naples ===
- "Napule è" by Pino Daniele

=== Padua ===
- "I've Come to Wive it Wealthily in Padua" by Cole Porter

=== Pompeii ===
- "Cities in Dust" by Siouxsie and the Banshees
- "Lava" by The B-52s
- "This Was Pompeii" by Dar Williams
- "Pompeii" by Bastille
- "Above the Clouds of Pompeii" by Bear's Den

=== Rimini ===
- "Rimini" by Les Wampas
- "Rimini" by Fabrizio de André

=== Rome ===
- "All Roads Lead to Rome" by The Stranglers
- "Arrivederci Roma" by Renato Rascel
- "Aroma a Roma (Sciopero)" by Juan María Solare
- "Autumn in Rome" by Peggy Lee
- "Dans les rues de Rome" by Dany Brillant
- "Fall of Rome" by James Reyne
- "In the Colosseum" by Tom Waits
- "Junge Römer" by Falco
- "On an Evening in Roma" by Dean Martin
- "Night in Rome" by Donny Benét
- "Paseando por Roma" by Soda Stereo
- "Rom" by Dschinghis Khan
- "Roma Capoccia" by Antonello Venditti
- "Romance in Rome" by Petula Clark
- "Roma Nuda" by Franco Califano
- "Rome" by Phoenix
- "Rome" by Lost Nation
- "Rome" by Yeasayer
- "Rome Wasn't Built in a Day" by Morcheeba
- "Rosaline" by Cold Chisel
- "The Burning of Rome (Cry for Pompeii)" by Virgin Steele
- "When in Rome" by Nickel Creek

=== Turin ===
- "Il cielo su Torino" by Subsonica
- "Torino" by Antonello Venditti

=== Venice ===
- "Beautiful Venice" by Joseph Philip Knight
- "Canale Grande Number One" by Peggy March
- "C'est Venice" by Toto Cutugno
- "L'Italie" by Christophe
- "Que C'est Triste Venise" by Charles Aznavour
- "Un Trasatlántico Entra a Venecia a la Caída del Sol" by Juan María Solare
- "Venezia" by Francesco Guccini
- "Venezia" by Hombres G
- "Venice Burning" by James LaBrie
- "And if Venice Is Sinking" by Spirit of the West
- "Venezia" by Vangelis
- "We Open in Venice" by Cole Porter

=== Verona ===
- "Verona" by Koit Toome and Laura
- "3ww" by ALT-J

== Ivory Coast ==
=== Abidjan ===
- "Cocody Rock!" by Alpha Blondy

== Jamaica ==
=== Kingston ===
- "Concrete Jungle" by The Wailers
- "Funky Kingston" by Toots and The Maytals
- "Jamaica Farewell" by Harry Belafonte
- "Kingston Town" by Lord Creator, also covered by UB40
- "Natty Dread" by Bob Marley & the Wailers
- "No Woman, No Cry" by Bob Marley & the Wailers
- "Trench Town" by Bob Marley & the Wailers
- "Trenchtown Rock" by The Wailers
- "Kingstown 14" by Gregory Isaacs
- "Kingston, Kingston" by Lou & the Hollywood Bananas

=== Montego Bay ===
- "Kokomo" by The Beach Boys
- "Montego Bay" by Bobby Bloom

== Japan ==
=== Fukuoka ===
- "Bachata en Fukuoka" by Juan Luis Guerra

=== Hiroshima ===
- "Enola Gay" by Orchestral Manoeuvres in the Dark
- "Hiroshima" by Ben Folds
- "Hiroshima" by Sandra
- "Hiroshima Mon Amour" by Alcatrazz
- "Threnody to the Victims of Hiroshima" by Krzysztof Penderecki

=== Kyoto ===
- "Alone in Kyoto" by Air
- "Burning Airlines Give You So Much More" by Brian Eno
- "Gion-cho" by Band-Maiko
- "Japanese Hands" by Elton John
- "Kyoto" by Phoebe Bridgers
- "Kyoto" by Skrillex
- "Kyoto Song" by The Cure
- "Move On" by David Bowie
- "Temple of The Golden Pavilion (Like Some Enormous Music)" by Philip Glass

=== Nagasaki ===
- "Nagasaki Wa Kyou Mo Ame Datta (長崎は今日も雨だった)" by Hiroshi Uchiyamada and Cool Five
- "Nagasaki (Ναγκασάκι)" by Tzimis Panousis
- "Nagasaki" by Harry Warren and Mort Dixon
- "Nagasaki Nightmare" by Crass

=== Nara ===
- "Arrival in Nara" by Alt-J
- "Leaving Nara" by Alt-J
- "Nara" by Alt-J

=== Yokohama ===
- "Blue Light Yokohama" by Ayumi Ishida
- "Welcome to Kanagawa" by Stephen Sondheim

== Kenya ==
=== Mombasa ===
- "Roland the Headless Thompson Gunner" by Warren Zevon
- "African Night Flight" by David Bowie

== Kosovo ==
=== Pristina ===
- "Welcome to Prishtina" by Adrian Gaxha

== Latvia ==
=== Riga ===
- "Dziesmiņa Rīgai" by Raimonds Pauls
- "Riga (Freedom)" by The Millions

== Lebanon ==
=== Beirut ===
- "Beirut" by Peter Sarstedt
- "Beirut Aam Tebki" by Assi El Hallani
- "Beyrouth" by Isabelle Aubret
- "Beyrouth" by Enrico Macias
- "Beyrouth" by Ibrahim Maalouf
- "Honeymoon in Beirut" by Rick Springfield
- "Le Beirut" by Fairuz
- "Ya Beirut" by Magida El Roumi
- "Ya Hawa Beirut" by Fairuz

== Libya ==
=== Tripoli ===
- "Marines' Hymn" by Jacques Offenbach

== Liechtenstein ==
=== Schaan ===
- "Hail to Liechtenstein" by Nanowar of Steel

=== Vaduz ===
- "Vaduz" by Erstes Wiener Heimorgelorchester

== Luxemburg ==
=== Luxemburg ===
- "Laksembörg Sitti" by Serge Tonnar
- "Sind Sie der Graf von Luxemburg" by Dorthe Kollo

== Mesopotamia ==
=== Babylon ===
- "Drunk in Babylon" by The Saints
- "Rivers of Babylon" by The Melodians, Boney M.

== Mexico ==
=== Acapulco ===
- "Acapulco" by Luis Mariano
- "Amor Eterno" by Rocío Dúrcal/Juan Gabriel
- "Fun in Acapulco" by Elvis Presley
- "Loco in Acapulco" by The Four Tops
- "You Can't Say No in Acapulco" by Elvis Presley

=== Atotonilco ===
- "Atotonilco" by Angélica María

=== Culiacán ===
- "Culiacán Sinaloa" by Chalino Sánchez
- "Un Fin de Semana en Culiacán" by Espinoza Paz

=== Ensenada ===
- "Ensenada" by Sublime

=== Guadalajara ===
- "¡Ay, Jalisco, no te rajes!", ranchera song composed by Manuel Esperón with lyrics by Ernesto Cortázar Sr.
- "My Old School" by Steely Dan

=== Hermosillo ===
- "Hermosillo, Sonora" by Juan Gabriel

=== Juarez ===
- "Corrido de Ciudad Juárez" by Francisco "Charro" Avitia
- "¡Arriba Juárez!" by Juan Gabriel
- "La frontera" by Juan Gabriel
- "Juárez es el #1" by Juan Gabriel
- "Juárez" by Tori Amos

=== Mexico City ===
- "Sábado Distrito Federal" by Chava Flores
- "Maxine" by Donald Fagen
- "Mexico City" by Jolie Holland
- "Mi Distrito Federal" by Los Tigres del Norte
- "Vieja Ciudad de Hierro" by Rockdrigo González
- "Distrito Federal" by Los Auténticos Decadentes

=== Monterrey ===
- "It Happened in Monterey" by Paul Whiteman

=== Sinaloa ===
- "El Sinaloense" by Pedro Infante

=== Tampico ===
- "Tampico" by June Christy
- "Tampico Trauma" by Jimmy Buffett
- "Einmal in Tampico" (Peter Moesser / Lotar Olias) by Freddy Quinn
- "Tampico" by Eddie Meduza
- "Tampico Twist" (Franny Beecher) by Bill Haley & His Comets
- "Tampico Hermoso", written by Samuel Margarito Lozano and made popular by Antonio Aguilar
- "En Tampico Está Lloviendo" by Lydia Mendoza
- "Beguine Tampico" by Tony Mottola
- "La Conocí en Tampico" (Montes) by Pepe Marchena
- "Tampico" (Adolf von Kleebsattel) by Heino

=== Tijuana ===
- "Born in East L.A." by Cheech Marin
- "The Tijuana Jail" by Kingston Trio
- "Tijuana Lady" by Gomez
- "Tijuana Makes Me Happy" by Nortec Collective
- "Tijuana Sound Machine" by Nortec Collective
- "Tijuana Taxi" by Herb Alpert and the Tijuana Brass
- "Welcome to Tijuana" by Manu Chao

=== Veracruz ===
- "Veracruz" by Agustín Lara
- "Mi Tierra Veracruzana" by Natalia Lafourcade

== Moldova ==
=== Bălți ===
- "Belz, Mayn Shtetele" by Jacob Jacobs and Alexander Olshanetsky

== Morocco ==
=== Marrakesh ===
- "Going to Marrakesh" by The Extra Lens
- "Marrakesh Express" by Crosby, Stills & Nash
- "Marrakesh Night Market" by Loreena McKennitt

=== Casablanca ===
- "Casablanca" by Nessbeal ft. Cheba Maria
- "Casablanca Nights" by Future World Orchestra

=== Tanger ===
- "Un automne à Tanger" by Hubert-Félix Thiéfaine
- "Tangier" by Donovan

=== Agadir ===
- "Ride to Agadir" by Mike Batt

== Nepal ==
=== Kathmandu ===
- "Katmandu" by Bob Seger
- "Katmandu" by Cat Stevens
- "Kathmandu" by Huub van der Lubbe
- "Kathmandu Dub" by Mad Professor

== Netherlands ==
=== Amersfoort ===
- "De Dominee Van Amersfoort" by Boudewijn de Groot

=== Delfzijl ===
- "De Hoaven van Delfziel" by Ede Staal

=== The Hague ===
- "Arm Den Haag" by Wieteke van Dort
- "In Den Haag Is Een Laan" by Conny Vandenbos
- "O O Den Haag" by Harry Klorkestein
- "Wat Voor Weer Zou Het Zijn In Den Haag?" by Conny Stuart

=== Hengelo ===
- "Hengelo-o-o" by Jeffrey Spalburg

=== Eindhoven ===
- "Eindhoven" by Kempi

=== Enschede ===
- "Ordinary to Enschede" by Half Man Half Biscuit

=== Groningen ===
- "Lil Craney" by Kraantje Pappie
- "Het Gras van het Noorderplantsoen" by Ralf Poelman

=== Leeuwarden ===
- "Joy in Leeuwarden (We Are Ready!)" by Half Man Half Biscuit

=== Maassluis ===
- "Maassluis" by The Amazing Stroopwafels

=== Maastricht ===
- "Ode aan Maastricht" by Benny Neyman

=== Nieuwegein ===
- "Herfst in Nieuwegein" by Spinvis

=== Nijmegen ===
- "Al mot ik krupen" by Graodus fan Nimwegen
- "Kronenburg Park" by Frank Boeijen
- "Nijmegen" by Ronnie Ruysdael
- "Nijmegen bij Zonsondergang" by Frank Boeijen
- "Nijmegen deur my trane" by Gert Vlok Nel

=== Rotterdam ===
- "Ben je in Rotterdam geboren" by Gerard Cox
- "De Reus van Rotterdam" by The Amazing Stroopwafels
- "Dijklied" by Drs. P
- "Keileweg" by The Amazing Stroopwafels
- "Oude Maasweg" by The Amazing Stroopwafels
- "Rotterdam, de mooiste rotstad die er is" by Hermes House Band
- "Rotterdam éch wel!" by Euromasters
- "Rotterdam (Or Anywhere)" by The Beautiful South
- "Rotterdam" by Léo Ferré
- "Rotterdam" by Mike Boddé
- "Rotterdam" by The Amazing Stroopwafels
- "Rotterdam Zuid" by The Amazing Stroopwafels
- "Vakantie in Overschie" by The Amazing Stroopwafels

=== Tilburg ===
- "Tilburg" by Guus Meeuwis

=== Sneek ===
- "Sneker Café" by Drs. P
- "Retour Sneek" by VOF de Kunst

=== Utrecht ===
- "Utereg me stadje" by Herman Berkien
- "Weg van Utrecht" by Het Goede Doel, Herman van Veen and Spinvis
- "(Ode aan) Utrecht" by Claudia de Breij

=== Wassenaar ===
- "Wassenaar" by Ross & Iba

=== Zwolle ===
- "Verre Oosten" by Opgezwolle
- "Zwolle zonder Dollen" by Van Kooten en de Bie

=== Zoutelande ===
- "Zoutelande" by BLØF

== New Zealand ==
=== Auckland ===
- "Dominion Road" by The Mutton Birds
- "Holiday in Auckland" by Mental As Anything

=== Hastings ===
- "Waimarama" by Franck Monnet

=== Wellington ===
- "Murder on Manners Street" by The Mockers
- "Wellington" by The Mutton Birds

== Nicaragua ==
=== Managua ===
- "Managua, linda Managua" by Otto de la Rocha
- "Surf Nicaragua" by Sacred Reich

== Nigeria ==
=== Lagos ===
- "Lagos vs New York" by Keziah Jones
- "Lagos Jump" by Third World
- "Lagos Anthem" by DJ Jimmy Jatt

== North Korea ==
=== Pyongyang ===
- "Pyongyang" by Blur

== Pakistan ==
=== Lahore ===
- "Lahore Lahore Aye" by Tariq Tafu
- "Lahore to Longsight" by Aziz Ibrahim
- "Lahore" by Guru Randhawa

== Panama ==
- "La Murga de Panama" by Héctor Lavoe
- "Oye" by Rubén Blades

== Peru ==
=== Lima ===
- "Bienvenue chez les nus" by Indochine
- "Lima de Novia" by Lucha Reyes
- "Chabuca Limeña" by Raphael
- "Rosa de Lima" by Joaquín Sabina
- "Lima de veras" by Los Cinco

== Poland ==
=== Bydgoszcz ===
- "Bydgoszcz jedyne miasto" by Irena Santor
- "Depesza z miasta B" by Roan

=== Gdańsk ===
- "Gdansk" by Test Dept
- "Sztany glany" by Kury
- "Zawsze Gdańsk" by Big Cyc

=== Gdynia ===
- "Gdynia nocą" by Apteka
- "Sztany glany" by Kury

=== Kraków ===
- "Blayb gezunt mir, Kroke" by Mordechai Gebirtig
- "Bracka" by Grzegorz Turnau
- "Krakofsky" by Happysad
- "Krakowski spleen" by Maanam
- "Kraków" by Marek Grechuta & Myslovitz
- "Kraków (Ocean wolnego czasu)" by Maanam
- "Miasto Kraków" by Homo Twist
- "Walczyk o Krakowie" by Sztywny Pal Azji

=== Łódź ===
- "Bałuty" by O.S.T.R.
- "Deszczowa piosenka" by Coma
- "Łódzka" by Artur Andrus
- "Łódź by Night" by Beltaine
- "Reprezentuj" by O.S.T.R.
- "Tabasko" by O.S.T.R.
- "Theo wir fahr'n nach Lodz" by Vicky Leandros
- "Uciekaj" by Cool Kids of Death

=== Piła ===
- "Piła tango" by Strachy na Lachy

=== Poznań ===
- "Ezoteryczny Poznań" by Pidżama Porno
- "Miasto doznań" by Muchy

=== Sopot ===
- "Sopot" by Ścianka
- "Sztany glany" by Kury

=== Szczecin ===
- "Szczecin" by The Analogs

=== Warsaw ===
- "Kamienne schodki" by Irena Santor & Kasia Stankiewicz
- "Les remparts de Varsovie" by Jacques Brel
- "Les Tzars" by Indochine
- "Na Francuskiej" by Rena Rolska
- "Nie masz cwaniaka nad warszawiaka" by Stanisław Grzesiuk
- "Piosenka o mojej Warszawie" by Mieczysław Fogg
- "Radio Warszawa" by Sidney Polak feat. Pezet
- "Sen o Warszawie" by Czesław Niemen
- "Stacja Warszawa" by Lady Pank
- "Sypka Warszawa" by Anna Maria Jopek
- "Taka Warszawa" by Beata Kozidrak
- "Tango Warszawo" by Stanisław Soyka & Agnieszka Osiecka
- "Telehon" by Pablopavo
- "Varsovie" by Brodka
- "Vava To" by Vavamuffin
- "Walczyk Warszawy" by Irena Santor
- "Warsaw" by Joy Division
- "Warsaw" by Rancid
- "Warsaw" by Sharon Van Etten
- "Warszawa" by David Bowie
- "Warszawa" by T.Love
- "Warszawa da się lubić" by Adolf Dymsza
- "Warszawo ma" by Zofia Mrozowska

=== Wrocław ===
- "Nadzieja o Wrocławiu" by Lech Janerka
- "Wrocławska Piosenka" by Maria Koterbska

== Portugal ==
=== Cascais ===
- "Baía de Cascais" by Delfins

=== Coimbra ===
- "Coimbra" by Amália Rodrigues
- "Coimbra Menina e Moça (Fado de Coimbra)" by Edmundo Bettencourt
- "Saudades de Coimbra" by José Afonso
- "Vira de Coimbra" by José Afonso
- "Do Choupal Até Á Lapa" by José Afonso
- "Balada da Despedida (Coimbra Tem Mais Encanto)" by Fernando Machado Soares

=== Lisbon ===
- "Cheira bem, cheira a Lisboa" by Amália Rodrigues
- "Lisboa, Menina e Moça" (Lisbon, a girl, a lass) by Carlos do Carmo
- "Lisbon" by Angra
- "Lisbon" by The Walkmen
- "Lisbon" by Wolf Alice
- "No Reason To Cry" by The Go-Betweens
- "Que fazes aí, Lisboa?", sung by fado singers like Mísia or Amália Rodrigues
- "Lisbonne" by Lilicub
- "Fado Lisboeta" by Amália Rodrigues
- "Lisbonne" by Charles Aznavour
- "Lisboa Antiga" by Amália Rodrigues
- "Madrugada de Alfama" by Amália Rodrigues
- "Lisboa" by Melody Gardot
- "Lisboa à Noite" by Amália Rodrigues
- "Esta Lisboa que eu amo" by Simone de Oliveira
- "Lisboa Não Sejas Francesa" by Amália Rodrigues
- "Maria Lisboa" by Amália Rodrigues
- "Canoas do Tejo" by Carlos do Carmo
- "Bairro Alto" by Carlos do Carmo
- "Teu nome Lisboa" by Carlos do Carmo
- "Marcha de Alfama" by Amália Rodrigues
- "Alfama" by Madredeus
- "Moro em Lisboa" by Madredeus
- "Nome de Rua" by Amália Rodrigues
- "Marcha do Centenário (Lisboa Nasceu)" by Amália Rodrigues
- "La vai Lisboa" by Amália Rodrigues
- "Lisboa dos Manjericos" by Amália Rodrigues
- "Lisboa dos Milagres" by Amália Rodrigues
- "Menina Lisboa" by Amália Rodrigues
- "Grande marcha de Lisboa" by Amália Rodrigues
- "Marcha da Mouraria" by Amália Rodrigues
- "Ai Mouraria" by Amália Rodrigues
- "Olha a Marcha de Benfica" by Amália Rodrigues
- "Noite de Santo António" by Amália Rodrigues
- "Lisboa Oxalá" by Carlos do Carmo e Carminho
- "Sempre Que Lisboa Canta" by Carlos do Carmo
- "A Luz de Lisboa (Claridade)" by Camané
- "É Lisboa a Namorar" by Cuca Roseta
- "Canção De Lisboa" by Fernando Farinha
- "O Fado Mora Em Lisboa" by Tony de Matos
- "Lisboa no Coraçao" by Joana Amendoeira
- "Lisboa e o Tejo" by Marina Mota
- "Ouve Lisboa" by Adélia Pedrosa
- "Lisboa que amanhece" by Sérgio Godinho e Caetano Veloso
- "Lisboa Velha Amiga" by Vera Mónica
- "Há Festa na Mouraria" by Alfredo Marceneiro

=== Peniche ===
- "Abandono" (Fado de Peniche) by Amália Rodrigues

=== Porto ===
- "Porto" by Worakls
- "Marcha São João do Porto" by Amália Rodrigues
- "Meus Olhos Que Por Alguém (Fado Menor Do Porto)" by Mariza
- "Menino do Bairro Negro" by Zeca Afonso
- "Porto Sentido" by Rui Veloso

== Puerto Rico ==
=== San Juan ===
- "America" by Stephen Sondheim and Leonard Bernstein
- "En San Juan Me Enamore" by Menudo
- "La Perla" by Calle 13
- "The Puerto Rico Song" by Saxboy Billy

== Romania ==
=== Bucharest ===
- "București" by La Familia
- "București" by Gabi Luncă
- "București, București" by Gică Petrescu
- "Bucurest(בוקרשט)" by Omer Adam

=== Timișoara ===
- "Timișoara" by Transsylvania Phoenix

=== Medgidia ===
- "Vin la noi la Medgidia" by Dan Spătaru

== Russia ==
=== Omsk ===
- "Dodenrit" by Drs. P

=== Saint Petersburg ===
- "Chyorny pyos Peterburg" by DDT
- "Leningrad" by Billy Joel
- "Rasputin" by Boney M.
- "Saint-Pétersbourg" by Desireless
- "St. Petersburg" by Supergrass
- "Sympathy for the Devil" by The Rolling Stones
- "V Pitere Pit'" by Leningrad

=== Sochi ===
- "Gorod Sochi" by Trofim

== Rwanda ==
=== Gisenyi ===
- "Irungu" by Mani Martin

=== Kigali ===
- "Inkera" by Miss Shanel
- "Rwanda" by Miss Shanel

== Senegal ==
=== Mbignona ===
- "Jammu Africa" by Ismaël Lô

== Serbia ==
=== Belgrade ===
- "Ruža vetrova" by Bajaga i instruktori
- "Gdje Dunav ljubi nebo" by Josipa Lisac
- "Stranac" by Drago Mlinarec
- "Beograd" by Ceca
- "Beograde" by Đorđe Marjanović
- "Moj dragi Beograd" by Lola Novaković

== Singapore ==
=== Singapore ===
- "Exotic and Erotic" by Sandy Marton

== Slovakia ==
=== Bratislava ===
- "Bratislava" by Beirut

=== Prešov ===
- "Obchádzka" by Heľenine oči

=== Prievidza ===
- "Prievidza" by Karpina

== South Africa ==
=== Cape Town ===
- Mentioned in "Lisa se Klavier" by Koos Kombuis later covered by Laurika Rauch, Parlotones, Dozi and Wasserfall
- "Palm Sunday (On Board The S.S. Within)" by The Go-Betweens
- "Cape Town" by The Young Veins
- "Capetown" by The Cranberries

=== Durban ===
- "Durban Deep" by Elton John
- "Durban Poison" by Graham Parker
- "Durban Skies" by Bastille

=== Johannesburg ===
- "Gimme Hope Jo'anna" by Eddy Grant
- "Hillbrow" by Johannes Kerkorrel
- "Johannesburg" by Gil Scott-Heron
- Mentioned in Oliver's Army by Elvis Costello
- "Meadowlands" (township of Johannesburg) by Strike Vilikazi, covered by Archie Coker & the Meteors and later by Richard Jon Smith, Ratau Mike Makhalemele and The Gugulethu Tenors.

=== Margate ===
- "Trein na Margate" by Steve Hofmeyr

=== Port Elizabeth ===
- "Biko" by Peter Gabriel

=== Pretoria ===
- "Trein na Pretoria" versions by Stefan Lubbe, Die Briels, Die Grafsteen Sangers, Dozi, Peter Senekal.
- "We are marching to Pretoria" (traditional)

=== Soweto ===
- "A Song for Soweto" by June Jordan
- "Soweto Blues" by Miriam Makeba
- "Soweto Dawn" by Ratau Mike Makhalemele
- "Zondag in Soweto" by Stef Bos
- "Im Ghetto von Soweto (Auntie's House)" by Joy Denalane

=== Pretoria/Tshwane ===
- "Mamelodi" (a Township in Pretoria) by Larry Joe featuring Vusi Mahlasela

== South Korea ==
=== Seoul ===
- "Gangnam Style" by Psy
- "Hymn of Seoul" by Patti Kim
- "Seoul" by Girls' Generation and Super Junior
- "Seoul" by Lee Yong
- "Seoul" by RM
- "Seoul, Seoul, Seoul" by Cho Yong-pil
- "Seoul 1987" by Cho Yong-pil
- "Seoul City" by Jennie
- "With Seoul" by BTS

=== Busan ===
- Dorawayo Busan Hang E (돌아와요 부산항에) sung by Cho Yong Pil

== Spain ==
=== Almería ===
- "Almería Tierra Noble" by David Bisbal
- "Viva Almería" by Manolo Escobar

=== Bilbao ===
- "Bilbao song" by Kurt Weill & Bertolt Brecht

=== Cádiz ===
- "Cadiz" by Hugh Cornwell
- "Cai", sung by Niña Pastori, written by Alejandro Sanz
- "La Belle de Cadix" by Luis Mariano

=== Córdoba ===
- "Córdoba" by Medina Azahara (band)
- "Cordoba" by Brian Eno and John Cale

=== Granada ===
- "Granada" written by Agustín Lara
- "Vuelvo a Granada" by Miguel Ríos

=== Huelva ===
- "Huelva" by Ecos del Rocío

=== Ibiza ===
- "I Took a Pill in Ibiza" by Mike Posner
- "People from Ibiza" by Sandy Marton

=== Málaga ===
- "Málaga" by Ecos del Rocío
- "Málaga" by Medina Azahara (band)
- "Málaga" by Fred Bongusto
- "Málaga" by Girls Names
- "Malagueña Salerosa" by Chingon

=== Madrid ===
- "Aquí no hay playa" by The Refrescos
- "Arde Madrid" by Mikel Erentxun
- "Así es Madrid" by Medina Azahara (band)
- "Bailando por ahí" by Juan Magán
- "Calles de Madrid" by Quique González
- "El cielo de Madrid" by Deluxe
- "El Pichi" or "Pichi", music by Francisco Alonso with lyrics by Emilio González and José Muñoz, sung by Celia Gámez among others.
- "En las calles de Madrid" by Rosana
- "Il neige sur Madrid" by Nicolas Peyrac
- "La Puerta de Alcalá" by Ana Belén and Víctor Manuel
- "Los nardos" or "Por la calle de Alcalá", music by Francisco Alonso with lyrics by Emilio González and José Muñoz, sung by Celia Gámez among others.
- "Km. 0" by Ismael Serrano
- "Lady Madrid" by Pereza
- "Madrid" by Pereza
- "Madrid" by Thalía
- "Madrid" by Amaral
- "Madrid" by Dover
- "Madrid" by El Canto del Loco
- "Madrid" by Holden
- "Madrid" by Burning
- "Madrid, Madrid" by Hombres G
- "Madrid, Madrid" by Nilda Fernández
- "Madrid, Madrid, Madrid", Schottische by Agustín Lara
- "Madrid-Memphis" by Javier Vargas
- "Musica notturna delle strade di Madrid" by Luigi Boccherini
- "Pasa el otoño" by Antonio Vega
- "Pongamos que hablo de Madrid" by Joaquín Sabina
- "Quédate en Madrid" by Mecano
- "Puedes contar conmigo" by La Oreja de Van Gogh
- "Rosa de Madrid", "Schottische", lyrics by José Soriano, music by Luis Barta sung by Concha Piquer, Sara Montiel and Lilian de Celis among others.
- "Te dejo Madrid" by Shakira
- "Tu mirada me hace grande" by Maldita Nerea
- "Vente pa´Madrid" by Ketama
- "Yo me bajo en Atocha" by Joaquín Sabina

=== Murcia ===
- "Murcia" by Agustín Lara

=== Salamanca ===
- "Mi Salamanca" by Rafael Farina

=== San Fernando, Cádiz ===
- "A San Fernando, un ratito a pie y otro caminando" by Manolo García

=== San Sebastián ===
- "La Playa" by La Oreja de Van Gogh, dedicated to the Beach of La Concha

=== Santiago de Compostela ===
- "Chove en Santiago" by Luar na Lubre, lyrics by Federico García Lorca

=== Seville ===
- "Sevilla" by Miguel Bosé
- "Sevilla" by Ecos del Rocío
- "Sevilla perfumada de naranjos" by Juan María Solare
- "Sevilla tiene un color especial" by Los del Río

=== Soria ===
- "Camino Soria" by Gabinete Caligari

=== Toledo ===
- "Toledo" by Agustín Lara

=== Torremolinos ===
- "Torremolinos" by Sttellla

=== Valencia ===
- "Valencia" by Agustín Lara
- "Valencia", pasodoble song by José Padilla, sung by Luis Mariano, Mistinguett and Tony Martin among others
- "Valencia" by Josh Rouse

=== Valladolid ===
- "Valladolid, Buenos Días" by El Niño Gusano

== Sweden ==
=== Gothenburg ===
- "Känn ingen sorg för mig Göteborg" by Håkan Hellström
- "Kalendervägen 113.D" by Jens Lekman

=== Uppsala ===
- "Ein Student aus Uppsala" by Kirsti Sparboe
- "Välkommen hem" by Labyrint

== Switzerland ==
=== Bern ===
- "Dynamit" by Mani Matter
- "W. Nuss vo Bümpliz" by Patent Ochsner

=== Geneva ===
- "Geneva" by Russian Circles

=== Montreux ===
- "Smoke on the Water" by Deep Purple

=== Wallisellen ===
- "Wallisellen" by Stiller Has

=== Zurich ===
- "Rainy Zurich" by The Fray

== Tanzania ==
=== Zanzibar ===
- "Cousins", theme from The Patty Duke Show
- "Uniguse" by Miss Shanel
- "Zanzibar" by Sérgio Mendes & the New Brasil '77
- "Zanzibar" by Billy Joel

== Tajikistan ==
=== Dushanbe ===
- "Dushanbe" by Aida Vedishcheva
- "Song about Dushanbe" by Vladimir Troshin, written by Alexander Zatsepin

== Thailand ==
=== Bangkok ===
- "A Passage to Bangkok" by Rush
- "Bangkok" by Alex Chilton
- "Bangkok City" by Orange Caramel
- "Houndog" by Cold Chisel
- "I Will Follow You into the Dark" by Death Cab for Cutie
- "One Night in Bangkok" by Murray Head
- "Roma-Bangkok" by Baby K
- "Bangkok" by Destroyer
- "กรุงเทพมหานคร" (Krung Thep Maha Nakhon) by อัสนี-วสันต์ (Asanee–Wasan). Its lyrics are the ceremonial name of Bangkok
- "Woke Up in Bangkok" by Deepend & YouNotUs ft. Martin Gallop

=== Chiang Mai ===
- "Above Chiangmai" by Harold Budd & Brian Eno
- "បុបា្ផឈាងម៉ៃ" (Bopha Chiang mai, บุปผาเชียงใหม่) by ស៊ិន ស៊ីសាមុត (Sinn Sisamouth, สิน ศรีสมุทร)

=== Chonburi ===
- "Pattaya" by Rim'K
- "Pattaya" by Katastrofe

== Tunisia ==
=== Tunis ===
- "Au Café des délices" by Patrick Bruel

== Turkey ==
=== Ankara ===
- "Ankara" by Vega
- "Ankara'da Aşık Olmak" by Zuhal Olcay

=== Bodrum ===
- "Bodrum" by MFÖ
- "Bodrum" by Hande Yener

=== Gaziantep ===
- "Gaziantep Yolunda" by Cem Adrian

=== Istanbul ===
- "Sensiz İstanbul'a Düşmanım" by Gripin
- "İstanbul İstanbul Olalı" by Sezen Aksu
- "İstanbul Hatırası" by Sezen Aksu
- "İstanbul'da Sonbahar" by Teoman
- "Yarim İstanbul" by Levent Yüksel
- "İstanbul" by Duman
- "Bu Sabah Yağmur var İstanbul'da" by MFÖ
- "İstanbul" by Sertab Erener
- "İstanbul" by Pamela Spence
- "İstanbul" by Ezginin Günlüğü
- "Kadıköy" by Ezginin Günlüğü
- "İstanbul Ağlıyor" by Tarkan
- "Aziz İstanbul" by Münir Nurettin Selçuk
- "Kalamış" by Münir Nurettin Selçuk
- "Kız Sen İstanbul'un Neresindensin" by Emel Sayın
- "Biz Heybeli'de Her Gece" by Emel Sayın
- "Beyoğlu'nda Gezersin" by Athena
- "Ceviz Ağacı" by Cem Karaca
- "Bir Garip Orhan Veli" by Muazzez Abacı
- "Bu Sabah Yağmur Var İstanbul'da" by MFÖ
- "Istanbul (Not Constantinople)" by the Four Lads, They Might Be Giants
- "C-O-N-S-T-A-N-T-I-N-O-P-L-E" by Paul Whiteman
- "Istanbul" by Morrissey
- "Istanbul" by Caterina Valente
- "Our Man In Istanbul" by Steve Stevens
- "Telephone Call From Istanbul" by Tom Waits
- "The Gates of Istanbul" by Loreena McKennitt
- "Istanbul" by Bosse
- "Istanbul" by Milica Pavlović
- "Istanbul" by Marc Aryan
- "Istanbul" by Darío Moreno
- "Bisanzio" by Francesco Guccini
- "Istanblues" by Juan María Solare

=== Izmir ===
- "İzmir'in Kızları" by Sezen Aksu
- "İzmir Yanıyor" by Sezen Aksu

== Ukraine ==
=== Kyiv ===
- "Kiev" by Barclay James Harvest
- "Kiev" by Renaissance
- "Kyiv" by Tom Misch and Yussef Dayes

=== Odesa ===
- "After All (The Odessa Staircase)" by Pet Shop Boys
- "Odessa (City on the Black Sea)" by Bee Gees
- "Auf dem Wege nach Odessa" by Alexandra

== United Arab Emirates ==
=== Abu Dhabi ===
- "Abu Dhabi" by Split Enz

== United Kingdom ==
=== Aberdeen ===
- "The Northern Lights of Old Aberdeen" originally by Mary Webb and covered by Jimmy Shand and The Alexander Brothers – sung by fans of Aberdeen F.C.
- "Aberdeen" by Cage The Elephant

=== Arun ===
- "An Old Cottage in Arun" by Juan María Solare

=== Belfast ===
- "Alternative Ulster" by Stiff Little Fingers
- "Ulster" by Sham 69
- "Belfast" by Boney M
- "Belfast" by Elton John
- "Belfast" by Neon Neon
- "Belfast" by Orbital
- "Belfast Child" by Simple Minds
- "Cyprus Avenue" by Van Morrisson
- "Northern Industrial Town" by Billy Bragg
- "Soldier" by Harvey Andrews
- "The Boys Of Belfast" by The Irish Rovers

=== Bradford ===
- "Back to Bradford" by Smokie

=== Brighton ===
- "Brighton Beach" by Rod Stewart
- "Rumble in Brighton" by Stray Cats
- "Brighton Rock" by Queen
- "You're Not from Brighton" by Fatboy Slim
- "Brighton Bomb" by Angelic Upstarts
- "From Brighton Beach to Santa Monica" by The Clientele
- "Cool Breeze of Brighton" by Tangerine Dream
- "La Baigneuse de Brighton" by Jane Birkin
- "Red Skies Over Paradise (A Brighton Dream)" by Fischer-Z
- "5:15" by The Who
- "Waiting for Changes" by Feeder
- "By the Sea" by Morcheeba
- "This Is the Sea" by The Waterboys
- "Last Bongo in Brighton remix" by DJ Format
- "Pinball Wizard" by The Who
- "Not The One" by Al Stewart
- "Waiting for the 7.18" by Bloc Party

=== Bristol ===
- "Bored in Bristol" by Alvvays

=== Coventry ===
- "Ghost Town" by The Specials
- "Coventry" by Chicks on Speed

=== Dover ===
- "Dover–Calais" by Style
- "Cliffs of Dover" by Eric Johnson
- "(There'll Be Bluebirds Over) The White Cliffs of Dover" by Walter Kent, made famous by Vera Lynn
- "Clover Over Dover" by Blur

=== Dundee ===
- "The Unicorn Invasion of Dundee" by Gloryhammer

=== Edinburgh ===
- "Breakfast on the Train" by Robert Forster
- "Edinburgh Man" by the Fall
- "Streets of Edinburgh" by the Proclaimers
- "Sunshine on Leith" by the Proclaimers

=== Glasgow ===
- "Feather On the Clyde" by Passenger
- "I Belong to Glasgow" by Will Fyffe
- "Glasgow" by Catfish and the Bottlemen
- "Glasgow Kiss" by John Petrucci
- "Nothing Ever Happens" by Del Amitri
- "Super Trouper" by ABBA
- "Tinseltown in the Rain" by The Blue Nile
- "Glasgow" by Jockstrap

=== Ipswich ===
- "Erbie Fitch's Twitch" from Redhead

=== Kilmarnock ===
- "Joyful Kilmarnock Blues" by The Proclaimers

=== Leeds ===
- "I Predict a Riot" by Kaiser Chiefs
- "Fallout" by Catfish and the Bottlemen
- "Andrew Eldrich Is Moving Back To Leeds" by The Mountain Goats
- "Leeds Station" by The Parachute Men
- "In The Gallery" by Dire Straits
- "Saturday/Sunday Lazy Leeds Afternoons" by the Rhythm Sisters

=== Derry ===
- "Sunday Bloody Sunday" by U2
- "Sunrise" by Divine Comedy
- "The Town I Loved So Well" by Phil Coulter

=== Newcastle upon Tyne ===
- "Blaydon Races" by George "Geordie" Ridley

=== Newport ===
- "Newport (Ymerodraeth State of Mind)" by M-J Delaney
- "You're Not from Newport" by Goldie Lookin Chain

=== Nottingham ===
- "Not in Nottingham" by Roger Miller

=== Salford ===
- "Dirty Old Town" by Ewan MacColl, covered by The Dubliners and The Pogues
- "Salford Sunday" by Richard Thompson
- "Shadows of Salford" by Doves

=== Sheffield ===
- "Coles Corner" by Richard Hawley
- "Sheffield:Sex City" by Pulp
- "Wickerman" by Pulp

=== Southampton ===
- "The Ballad of John and Yoko" by The Beatles

=== Three Bridges ===
- "Three Bridges" by Juan María Solare

=== Wakefield ===
- "I've Tried Everything" by The Cribs

== United States ==
=== Aberdeen, Maryland ===
- "I-95" by Fountains of Wayne

=== Abilene, Kansas ===
- "Abilene" by George Hamilton IV
- "Loser" by Grateful Dead
- "Buffalo Ballet" by John Cale

=== Akron, Ohio ===
- "Downtown (Akron)" by The Pretenders
- "My City Was Gone" by The Pretenders

=== Albuquerque, New Mexico ===
- "Albuquerque" by Neil Young
- "Albuquerque" by Sons of the Desert
- "Albuquerque" by "Weird Al" Yankovic
- "Alburquerque (Wild Scenes)" by The Psychotic Turnbuckles
- "Blue Bedroom" Toby Keith
- "Bring Em Out" by T.I.
- "By the Time I Get to Phoenix" by Frank Sinatra, Glen Campbell, Dean Martin, Roger Miller, Engelbert Humperdinck, Johnny Rivers
- "Cowboy Movie" by David Crosby
- "(Get Your Kicks on) Route 66" by Bobby Troup
- "I Hope Your Whole Life Sux" by Blackbear
- "Make it Clap" by Busta Rhymes
- "Space Between Us" by Sister Hazel
- "The King of Rock 'n' Roll" by Prefab Sprout
- "Point Me in the Direction of Albuquerque" by Tony Romeo
- "The Promised Land" by Chuck Berry
- "Train Kept a Rollin'" by Stray Cats
- "Wanted Man" by Johnny Cash, Bob Dylan, Nick Cave

=== Allentown, Pennsylvania ===
- "Allentown" by Billy Joel
- "Allentown Jail" by Kingston Trio

=== Amarillo, Texas ===
- "Amarillo" by Gorillaz
- "Amarillo" by Emmylou Harris
- "Amarillo by Morning" by George Strait
- "Amarillo Sky" by Jason Aldean
- "If Hollywood Don't Need You (Honey I Still Do)" by Don Williams
- "Is This the Way to Amarillo" by Neil Sedaka and Howard Greenfield
- "(Get Your Kicks on)Route 66" by Bobby Troup
- "Thumbelina" by The Pretenders

=== Anchor Bay, California ===
- "In Anchor Bay" by Sue Bohlin

=== Ann Arbor, Michigan ===
- "I Want to Go Back to Michigan" by Anonymous, popularized by University of Michigan Men's Glee Club
- "Last Parade on Ann Street" by Chris Bathgate

=== Anchorage, Alaska ===
- "Anchorage" by Michelle Shocked

=== Arlington, Virginia ===
- "Arlandria" by Foo Fighters
- "Arlington" by Trace Adkins

=== Asbury Park, New Jersey ===
- "Fourth of July, Asbury Park (Sandy)" by Bruce Springsteen
- "My City of Ruins" by Bruce Springsteen

=== Astoria, Oregon ===
- "So Long, Astoria" by The Ataris

=== Athens, Georgia ===
- "Butterbean" by The B-52s
- "Love Shack" by The B-52s

=== Atlantic City, New Jersey ===
- "Atlantic City" by Bruce Springsteen

=== Augusta, Georgia ===
- "There Was a Time" by James Brown

=== Austin, Texas ===
- "Amy's Back In Austin" by Little Texas
- "Austin" by Blake Shelton
- "Austin" by Dasha
- "Austin in My Sights" by The Bluescasters
- "Austin to Ashes" by the Turnpike Troubadours

=== Avalon (Catalina Isl.), California ===
- "Avalon" by Lionel Hampton
- "Southern Cross" by Crosby, Stills & Nash

=== Bad Axe, Michigan ===
- "Bad Axe, Michigan" by Air Traffic Controller

=== Bakersfield, California ===
- "Bakersfield" by Social Distortion
- "Mexicali Blues" by Grateful Dead
- "Streets of Bakersfield" by Dwight Yoakam
- "Far Away Eyes" by Rolling Stones

=== Baltimore, Maryland ===
- "Baltimore" by the Extra Lens
- "Baltimore" by Israel Nash
- "Baltimore" by Lyle Lovett
- "Baltimore" by Mal Blum
- "Baltimore" by Prince
- "Baltimore" by Randy Newman, Nina Simone
- "Baltimore" by Sonny James
- "Baltimore" by Stephen Malkmus and The Jicks
- "Baltimore" by Tennis
- "Baltimore's Fireflies" by Woodkid
- "Barefoot in Baltimore" by Strawberry Alarm Clock
- "Blue Skies Over Dundalk" by Mary Prankster
- "Engine Engine Number 9" by Roger Miller
- "For Baltimore" by All Time Low
- "The Girl From Baltimore" by The Fleshtones
- "Good Morning Baltimore" from Hairspray!
- "Heaven in Baltimore" by Dale Watson
- "Hungry Heart" by Bruce Springsteen
- "Moonlight Feels Right" by Starbuck
- "Raining in Baltimore" by Counting Crows
- "Streets of Baltimore" by Bobby Bare
- "Willie Jones" by the Charlie Daniels Band
- "Baltimore to Washington" by Woody Guthrie & Cisco Houston
- "The Lady Came from Baltimore" by Tim Hardin
- "The Star-Spangled Banner" by Francis Scott Key
- "Feats Don't Fail Me Now" by Little Feat

=== Bangor, Maine ===
- "King of the Road" by Roger Miller

=== Baton Rouge, Louisiana ===
- "Calling Baton Rouge" by Garth Brooks
- "Me and Bobby McGee" by Kris Kristofferson, made famous by Janis Joplin
- “Greenville to Baton Rouge” by Drive-by Truckers
- “Baton Rouge” by Guy Clark
- "Baton Rouge" by The Nixons
- "Louisiana Rain" by Tom Petty and the Heartbreakers
- "Memory Motel" by the Rolling Stones
- "The Nightfly" by Donald Fagen

=== Baxter Springs, Kansas ===
- "Choctaw Bingo" by James McMurtry

=== Beaumont, Texas ===
- "Beaumont" by Hayes Carll
- "Pretty Little Lady from Beaumont, Texas" by George Jones
- "The Night's Too Long" by Patty Loveless

=== Bluefield, West Virginia ===
- "Rockin' Roll Baby" by The Stylistics

=== Boca Raton, Florida ===
- "Boca Raton" by Stephen Sondheim

=== Bossier City, Louisiana ===
- "Bossier City" by the Turnpike Troubadours

=== Boulder, Colorado ===
- "Boulder to Birmingham" by Emmylou Harris

=== Brownsville, Texas ===
- "It's All Here in Brownsville" by The Mountain Goats

=== Buffalo, New York ===
- "The Ballad of Czolgosz" by Stephen Sondheim
- "Broadway" by Goo Goo Dolls
- "Shuffle Off to Buffalo" by the Stolen Sweets
- "Truckin" by Grateful Dead
- "Ladies Night in Buffalo" by David Lee Roth
- "Rock and Roll Girls" by John Fogerty
- "Buffalo" by the Church
- "Tripe Face Boogie" by Little Feat

=== Camarillo, California ===
- "Parker's Band" by Steely Dan
- "Relaxin' at Camarillo" by Charlie Parker

=== Cape May, New Jersey ===
- "On the Way to Cape May" by Maurice "Buddy" Nugent

=== Charleston, South Carolina ===
- "Carolina" by Corey Smith
- "Holy City" by Edwin McCain
- "Charleston"
- "You Can Have Charleston" by Darius Rucker

=== Charleston, West Virginia ===
- “Charleston Girl” by Tyler Childers

=== Charlotte, North Carolina ===
- "Gridiron Fight" (about the Panthers) by Paper Tongues
- "In Charlotte" by Young Dolph
- "Brick" by Ben Folds Five
- “Charlotte's in North Carolina” by Keith Whitley

=== Chattanooga, Tennessee ===
- "The Chattanooga Shoot Shoot" by Darren Hanlon
- "Chattanooga Sugar Babe" by Johnny Cash
- "Chattanooga Choo Choo" by The Andrews Sisters, Glenn Miller
- “Chattanooga Lucy” by Eric Church
- 'Chattanooga Shoe Shine Boy" by Red Foley

=== Cheyenne, Wyoming ===
- "I Can Still Make Cheyenne" by George Strait
- "Jack Straw" by Grateful Dead
- "The Beaches of Cheyenne" Garth Brooks
- "July in Cheyenne" by Aaron Watson

=== Cincinnati, Ohio ===
- "Comin' to Your City" by Big & Rich
- "Fins" by Jimmy Buffett
- "Jesus, Take the Wheel" by Carrie Underwood
- "Lights of Cincinnati" by Scott Walker
- "Susie Cincinnati" by The Beach Boys
- "WKRP in Cincinnati Main Theme" from WKRP in Cincinnati

=== Cleveland, Ohio ===
- "Anything But Mine" by Kenny Chesney
- "Burn On" by Randy Newman
- "Christmas in Cleveland" by The Raveonettes
- "Cleveland" by Jewel
- "Cleveland is the City" by Bone Thugs-N-Harmony
- "Cleveland" by All-Time Quarterback
- "Cleveland" by Machine Gun Kelly
- "Cleveland Is the Reason" by Kid Cudi
- "Cleveland Ohio Blues" by Bull Moose Jackson
- "Cleveland Rocks" by Ian Hunter
- "Cuyahoga" by R.E.M.
- "The Heart of Rock & Roll" by Huey Lewis and the News
- "East 1999" by Bone Thugs-N-Harmony
- "In the Heartland" by the Michael Stanley Band
- "Let's Get Wrecked" by honeyhoney
- "Let's Move to Cleveland" by Frank Zappa
- "Mean Night in Cleveland" by Cactus
- "Missing Cleveland" by Scott Weiland
- "My Town" by Michael Stanley Band
- "Ohio (Come Back to Texas)" by Bowling for Soup
- "Pancho and Lefty" by Townes Van Zandt, covered by Willie Nelson and Merle Haggard
- "Precious" by The Pretenders
- "Skinny Little Boy from Cleveland" by Alex Bevan
- "Stairway to Cleveland" by Jefferson Starship
- "Till I Die" by Machine Gun Kelly
- "The Wreck of the Edmund Fitzgerald" by Gordon Lightfoot

=== Cleveland Heights, Ohio ===
- "Cleveland!" by Taylor Swift

=== Coeur d'Alene, Idaho ===
- "All I Left Behind" by Linda Ronstadt and Emmylou Harris
- "Coeur d'Alene" by The Head and the Heart
- "Coeur d'Alene" by Alter Bridge
- "Coeur d'Alene" by Tyson Motsenbocker

=== Columbus, Ohio ===
- "Road Outside Columbus" by O.A.R.

=== Commerce City, Colorado ===
- "Commerce City Sister" by DeVotchKa

=== Crescent City, California ===
- "Crescent City" by I'm with Her

=== Cripple Creek, Colorado ===
- "Up on Cripple Creek" by The Band
- "Cripple Creek Ferry" by Neil Young

=== Cuyahoga Falls, Ohio ===
- "My City Was Gone" by The Pretenders

=== Danville, Virginia ===
- "The Night They Drove Old Dixie Down" by The Band
- "The Wreck of the Old 97" by G. B. Grayson and Henry Whitter

=== Dallas, Texas ===
- "Big D" from The Most Happy Fella
- "Dallas" by Alan Jackson
- "Dallas" by The Flatlanders
- "Dallas" by Holly McNarland
- "Dallas" by Silver Jews
- "Dallas" by Johnny Winter
- "Dallas 1pm" by Saxon
- "Dallas After Midnight" by Ray Wylie Hubbard (with Jack Ingram)
- "Dallas Days and Fort Worth Nights" by Chris LeDoux
- "Goin Through The Big D" by Mark Chesnutt
- "He's in Dallas" by Reba McEntire
- "Hot Night in Dallas" by Moon Martin
- "I Drove Her to Dallas" by Ty England
- "People in Dallas Got Hair" by Waylon Jennings
- "Pecos Promenade" by Tanya Tucker
- "Run" by George Strait
- "Truckin'" by Grateful Dead
- "Trudy" by the Charlie Daniels Band
- "Willin'" by Little Feat
- "Blues in Dallas" by The Mountain Goats

=== Decatur, Georgia ===
- "For The Good Times (Straight from the Dec)" by Ghetto Mafia

=== Decatur, Illinois ===
- "Decatur, or, Round of Applause for Your Stepmother!" by Sufjan Stevens

=== Del Mar, California ===
- "Surfin' U.S.A." by The Beach Boys

=== Denver, Colorado ===
- "40 Miles from Denver" by Yonder Mountain String Band
- "Denver" by Larry Gatlin & the Gatlin Brothers
- "Denver" by Willie Nelson
- "From Denver to L.A." by Elton John
- "Get Out of Denver" by Bob Seger
- "Left for Denver" by The Lumineers
- "Me and My Uncle" by Grateful Dead
- "O.D.'d in Denver" by Hank Williams Jr.
- "Please Come to Boston" by Dave Loggins
- "Things to Do in Denver When You're Dead" by Warren Zevon

=== Des Moines, Iowa ===
- "Des Moines, Iowa" by The Milk Carton Kids
- "The Dry Cleaner from Des Moines" by Joni Mitchell

=== Doraville, Georgia ===
- "Doraville" by Atlanta Rhythm Section

=== East St. Louis, Illinois ===
- "East St. Louis Toodle-Oo" by Duke Ellington

=== El Paso, Texas ===
- "All the Way Down to El Paso" by Elton John
- "El Paso" by The Gourds
- "El Paso" by Marty Robbins
- "El Paso" by Old 97's
- "El Paso" by Taking Back Sunday
- "El Paso City" by Marty Robbins
- "Feleena (From El Paso)" by Marty Robbins
- "Texas Women" by Hank Williams Jr.

=== Eugene, Oregon ===
- "Eugene" by Sufjan Stevens
- "Eugene, Oregon" by Dolly Parton

=== Flagstaff, Arizona ===
- "Convoy" by C.W. McCall
- "(Get Your Kicks on) Route 66" by Bobby Troup

=== Flint, Michigan ===
- "Flint (For the Unemployed and Underpaid)" by Sufjan Stevens

=== Folsom, California ===
- "Folsom Prison Blues" by Johnny Cash

=== Fort Lauderdale, Florida ===
- "Fort Lauderdale Chamber of Commerce" by Elvis Presley
- "All Signs Point to Lauderdale" by A Day to Remember

=== Fort Worth, Texas ===
- "Dallas Days and Fort Worth Nights" by Chris LeDoux
- "Does Fort Worth Ever Cross Your Mind" by George Strait
- "Fort Worth Blues" by Steve Earle

=== Gainesville, Florida ===
- "City of Gainesville" by Less Than Jake
- "Gainesville" by Tom Petty
- "Gainesville Rock City" by Less Than Jake

=== Galveston, Texas ===
- "Darling I Need You" by John Cale
- "Galveston" by Jimmy Webb
- "Pecos Promenade" by Tanya Tucker
- "Sylvia's Mother" by Dr. Hook & the Medicine Show

=== Garden Grove, California ===
- "Garden Grove" by Sublime, covered by Camper Van Beethoven
- "Home Again Garden Grove" by The Mountain Goats

=== Gary, Indiana ===
- "2300 Jackson Street" by The Jacksons
- "Gary, Indiana" from The Music Man

=== Gatlinburg, Tennessee ===
- "A Boy Named Sue" by Johnny Cash
- "Smoky Mountain Rain" by Ronnie Milsap

=== Greensboro, North Carolina ===
- "88 Seconds in Greensboro" by Orchestral Manoeuvres in the Dark

=== Hackensack, New Jersey ===
- "Hackensack" by Fountains of Wayne
- "Movin' Out (Anthony's Song)" by Billy Joel

=== Hoboken, New Jersey ===
- "Hoboken" by Operation Ivy

=== Holland, Michigan ===
- "Holland" by Sufjan Stevens

=== Honolulu, Hawaii ===
- "Honolulu City Lights" by Keola Beamer and Kapono Beamer
- "Honolulu Lulu" by Jan and Dean
- "She Let Herself Go" by George Strait

=== Highland, Illinois ===
- "Concerning the UFO Sighting near Highland, Illinois" by Sufjan Stevens

=== Houston, Texas ===
- "Amarillo by Morning" by George Strait
- "Bloody Mary Morning" by Willie Nelson
- "Dixie on My Mind" by Hank Williams Jr.
- "Dracula From Houston" by Butthole Surfers
- "Heaven, Hell, or Houston" by ZZ-Top
- "Houston" by R.E.M.
- "Houston" by Lee Hazlewood
- "Houston" by Soul Coughing
- "Houston (Means I'm One Day Closer to You)" by Larry Gatlin & the Gatlin Brothers
- "Houston" by Dean Martin
- "Houston Heights" by Blue October
- "Houston Town" by Buddy Ace
- "Life During Wartime" by Talking Heads
- "Midnight Special" by Lead Belly
- "Telephone Road" by Rodney Crowell
- "Telephone Road" by Steve Earle
- "Truckin’" by Grateful Dead
- "Uneasy Rider '88" by the Charlie Daniels Band
- "Welcome 2 Houston" by Slim Thug and The Texas All Stars
- "Welcome to H-Town" by Lecrae ft. Dre Murray
- "Won't Let You Down Texas" by Chamillionaire
- "Tripe Face Boogie" by Little Feat

=== Indianapolis, Indiana ===
- "Indianapolis" by Menudo
- "Little Green Apples" sung by O.C. Smith
- "Mary Jane's Last Dance" by Tom Petty
- "Stuck in Indianapolis" by Bottle Rockets

=== Jackson, Mississippi ===
- "Halley Came to Jackson" by Mary Chapin Carpenter
- "Jackson" by Johnny Cash & June Carter, Nancy Sinatra & Lee Hazlewood
- "Jackson" by Lucinda Williams
- "Jackson Ain't a Very Big Town" by Norma Jean
- "Jackson Mississippi" by Kid Rock
- "Uneasy Rider" by the Charlie Daniels Band

=== Jacksonville, Florida ===
- "I'll Never Play Jacksonville Again" by Graham Parker
- "Indigo Flow" by Limp Bizkit
- "Ocean Avenue" by Yellowcard
- "The South's Gonna Do It" by The Charlie Daniels Band
- "Jacksonville Kid" by Lynyrd Skynyrd

=== Jacksonville, Illinois ===
- "Jacksonville" by Sufjan Stevens

=== Jacksonville, North Carolina ===
- "Jacksonville Skyline" by Whiskeytown
- “Jacksonville” by American Aquarium

=== Jersey City, New Jersey ===
- "Devil in Jersey City" by Coheed and Cambria
- "Jersey Bounce" by Tiny Bradshaw

=== Juneau, Alaska ===
- "Juneau" by Port Blue
- "Juneau" by Funeral for a Friend

=== Kalamazoo, Michigan ===
- "I've Got a Gal in Kalamazoo" by the Glenn Miller Orchestra
- "Gotta Get Away" by The Black Keys
- "Kalamazoo" by Primus
- "Kalamazoo" by Ben Folds

=== Kansas City, Missouri ===
- "18th Avenue (Kansas City Nightmare)" by Cat Stevens
- "Blues from Kansas City" by Jay McShann
- "K.C. Blues" by Charlie Parker
- "Kansas City" by Okkervil River
- "Kansas City" by The New Basement Tapes
- "Kansas City", from the musical Oklahoma!
- "Kansas City", performed by Wilbert Harrison
- "Kansas City" by Sneaky Sound System
- "Kansas City Bomber" by Phil Ochs
- "Kansas City Kitty" by Walter Donaldson
- "Kansas City Lights" by Steve Wariner
- "Kansas City Shuffle" by J. Ralph
- "Kansas City Shuffle (Intro)" by Tech N9ne
- "Kansas City Star" by Roger Miller
- "Kansas Rock City" by Kiss
- "Liberty Street" by The New Basement Tapes
- "Six Months in Kansas City (Liberty Street)" by The New Basement Tapes
- "Train from Kansas City" by Neko Case
- "The Kansas City Song" by Buck Owens
- "Kansas City Milkman" by Level 42

=== Kent, Ohio ===
- "Ohio" by Crosby, Stills, Nash, & Young

=== Knoxville, Tennessee ===
- "Knoxville Girl" by Nick Cave
- "Knoxville Courthouse" by Hank Williams Jr.

=== La Grange, Texas ===
- "La Grange" by ZZ Top

=== Laramie, Wyoming ===
- "Lady from Laramie" by Burl Ives
- "Laramie" by Cymbals Eat Guitars
- "Laramie" by Geoff Love
- "Laramie" by Glenn Mercer
- "Laramie, Wyoming" by Richmond Fontaine
- "Lights of Laramie" by Ian Tyson
- "The Man from Laramie" by Al Martino
- "Somewhere West of Laramie" by Hank Cramer

=== Laredo, Texas ===
- "Laredo" by Band of Horses
- ”Laredo” by Chris Cagle
- "Me & Paul" by Willie Nelson
- "New Year's Day" by Charlie Robison
- "Somewhere Over Laredo" by Lainey Wilson
- "Streets of Laredo" (old cowboy song)
- "Laredo Tornado" by Electric Light Orchestra
- "The Devil Sent You to Laredo" by Baccara
- "Wheels of Laredo" by Tanya Tucker, The Highwomen

=== Las Vegas, Nevada ===
- "Alone in Vegas" by Pusha T
- "Checkout Time in Vegas" by Drive-By Truckers
- "Do It Again" by Steely Dan
- "Gone Country" by Alan Jackson
- "Heaven or Las Vegas" by Cocteau Twins
- "Las Vegas Nights" by Verona Grove
- "Leaving Las Vegas" by Sheryl Crow
- "Let's Go to Vegas" by Faith Hill
- "Vegas" by Sara Bareilles
- "Ooh Las Vegas" by Gram Parsons
- "Pretty Vegas" by INXS
- "Pyramids" by Frank Ocean
- "Queen of Las Vegas" by The B-52s
- "Sam's Town" by The Killers
- "She Let Herself Go" by George Strait
- "Show Biz Kids" by Steely Dan
- "Vegas" by Calvin Harris
- "Vegas" by Kehlani
- "Vegas Lights" by Panic! At The Disco
- "Viva Las Vegas" by Elvis Presley
- "Waking Up in Vegas" by Katy Perry
- "Welcome to Fabulous Las Vegas" by Brandon Flowers

=== Laurel, Mississippi ===
- "Goin' Down to Laurel" by Steve Forbert

=== Lincoln, Nebraska ===
- "The Flight (Lincoln to Minneapolis)" by Blue October
- "Nebraska" by Bruce Springsteen

=== Lithonia, Georgia ===
- "Lithonia" by Childish Gambino

=== Little Rock, Arkansas ===
- "A Little Past Little Rock" by Lee Ann Womack
- "I Hear Little Rock Calling" by Ferlin Husky
- "Little Rock" by Collin Raye
- "We're an American Band" by Grand Funk Railroad
- "Two Little Girls from Little Rock" by Marilyn Monroe

=== Lodi, California ===
- "Lodi" by Creedence Clearwater Revival

=== Louisville, Kentucky ===
- "Home Away from Home" by Pokey LaFarge
- "Flora" by Peter, Paul and Mary
- "Louisville K-Y" by Ella Fitzgerald
- "Louisville" by Amos Lee

=== Lubbock, Texas ===
- "Going to Lubbock" by The Extra Lens
- "Lubbock or Leave It" by Dixie Chicks
- "Texas in My Rearview Mirror" by Mac Davis

=== Luckenbach, Texas ===
- "Luckenbach, Texas (Back to the Basics of Love)" by Waylon Jennings

=== Malibu, California ===
- "L.A. Boyz" by Victoria Justice and Ariana Grande
- "Malibu" by Hole
- "Malibu" by Kim Petras
- "Malibu" by Miley Cyrus
- "Malibu Gas Station" by Sonic Youth

=== Manti, Utah ===
- "The Town that Raised Me" by Mary Kaye

=== Marina del Rey, California ===
- "Marina del Rey" by George Strait

=== Marshalltown, Iowa ===
- "Marshalltown" by Modern Life Is War

=== Memphis, Tennessee ===
Memphis holds the distinction of being the most mentioned city in the world when it comes to commercially recorded songs. As of July 2013, this list has made it up to 1074 songs and counting. The list is maintained at the Memphis Rock and Soul Museum website. The ones listed below are some of the better-known songs:

- "All the Way from Memphis" by Mott the Hoople
- "Black Velvet" by Alannah Myles
- "Candyman" by Grateful Dead
- "Cities" by Talking Heads
- "Considering a Move to Memphis" by The Colorblind James Experience
- "Crazed Country Rebel" by Hank Williams III
- "Graceland" by Paul Simon
- "Guitar Man" by Jerry Reed
- "Letter to Memphis" by Pixies
- "Maybe It Was Memphis" by Pam Tillis
- "Memphis" by Joe Jackson
- "Memphis" by Johnny Rivers
- "Memphis" by Marcy Playground
- "Memphis" by PJ Harvey
- "Memphis Beat" by Jerry Lee Lewis
- "Memphis Belle" by Hank Williams Jr.
- "Memphis Blues" by W. C. Handy
- "Memphis Skyline" by Rufus Wainwright
- "Memphis Soul Stew" by King Curtis
- "Memphis, Tennessee" by Chuck Berry
- "Messed Up in Memphis" by Darryl Worley
- "Move to Memphis" by a-ha
- "New Minglewood Blues" by Grateful Dead
- "Night Train to Memphis" by Roy Acuff
- "Nothing 'Bout Memphis" by Trisha Yearwood
- "Pride (In the Name of Love)" by U2
- "Queen of Memphis" by Confederate Railroad
- "Streets of West Memphis" by Crime & the City Solution
- "That's How I Got to Memphis" by Bobby Bare
- "The Golden Road (To Unlimited Devotion)" by Grateful Dead
- "Truck Drivin' Man" by Lynyrd Skynyrd
- "Walking in Memphis" by Marc Cohn
- "West Memphis" by Lucinda Williams
- "What's Your Mama's Name" by Tanya Tucker
- "A White Suit in Memphis" by Simon Bonney
- "Wrong Side of Memphis" by Trisha Yearwood
- "Dixie Chicken" by Little Feat

=== Milwaukee, Wisconsin ===
- "Milwaukee Polka" by Frankie Yankovic
- "What Made Milwaukee Famous (Has Made a Loser Out of Me)" by Jerry Lee Lewis
- "Holocene" by Bon Iver
- "Milwaukee, Here I Come" by George Jones and Brenda Carter

=== Minneapolis, Minnesota ===
- "Always Coming Back Home to You" by Atmosphere
- "Christmas Card from a Hooker in Minneapolis" by Tom Waits
- "Lake Street Is for Lovers" by Lifter Puller
- "Little Green Apples" sung by O.C. Smith
- "Mall of America" by Desaparecidos
- "Minneapolis" by That Dog
- "Minneapolis" by Lucinda Williams
- "Minneapolis" by Bill Janovitz
- "MPLS Song" by Pinhead Gunpowder
- "Ninth and Hennepin" by Tom Waits
- "Positively Fourth Street" by Bob Dylan
- "Rock 'n' Roll Is Alive (And It Lives in Minneapolis)" by Prince
- "Shhh" by Atmosphere
- "Seeing Double at the Triple Rock" by NOFX
- "Skyway" by The Replacements
- "Southtown Girls" by The Hold Steady
- "Streets of Minneapolis" by Bruce Springsteen
- "Stuck Between Stations" by The Hold Steady
- "Sunshine" by Atmosphere
- "Uptown" by Prince
- "Your Little Hoodrat Friend" by The Hold Steady

=== Mobile, Alabama ===
- "Gypsys, Tramps & Thieves" by Cher
- "Mobile" by the Mountain Goats
- "Stuck Inside of Mobile with the Memphis Blues Again" by Bob Dylan

=== Montgomery, Alabama ===
- "Midnight in Montgomery" by Alan Jackson
- "Montgomery, Alabama" by David Yazbek
- "Montgomery in the Rain" by Hank Williams Jr.
- "The Ride" by David Allan Coe
- "Tokyo Storm Warning" by Elvis Costello
- "200 More Miles" by Cowboy Junkies
- "Angel From Montgomery" by John Prine

=== Moscow, Idaho ===
- "Moscow, Idaho" by The Cassandra Complex

=== Muncie, Indiana ===
- "I Wanna Talk About Me" by Toby Keith

=== Muscle Shoals, Alabama ===
- "Sweet Home Alabama" by Lynyrd Skynyrd

=== Muskegon, Michigan ===
- "They Also Mourn Who Do Not Wear Black" by Sufjan Stevens

=== Muskogee, Oklahoma ===
- "Okie from Muskogee" by Merle Haggard

=== Myrtle Beach, South Carolina ===
- "Dancin', Shaggin' on the Boulevard" by Alabama
- "Ocean Boulevard" by Band of Oz
- "19 You + Me" by Dan + Shay
- "Myrtle Beach Summer 1974" by Yung Gravy

=== Olema, California ===
- "Hippie from Olema" by The Youngbloods

=== Oklahoma City, Oklahoma ===
- "Oklahoma City" by Zach Bryan

=== Olympia, Washington ===
- "Rock Star" by Hole
- "Olympia WA." by Rancid

=== Omaha, Nebraska ===
- "Convoy" by C. W. McCall
- "Omaha" by Counting Crows
- "Omaha" by Waylon Jennings
- "(Ready or Not) Omaha Nebraska" by Bowling for Soup
- "Turn the Page" by Bob Seger
- "Uneasy Rider" by the Charlie Daniels Band
- "We're an American Band" by Grand Funk Railroad
- "Greater Omaha" by Desaparecidos

=== Palestine, Texas ===
- "Palestine, Texas" by T Bone Burnett

=== Panama City, Florida ===
- "Guitar Man" by Jerry Reed

=== Pasadena, California ===
- "The Little Old Lady (from Pasadena)" by Jan and Dean

=== Pensacola, Florida ===
- "Pensacola" by Deerhunter
- "Maybe Angels" by Sheryl Crow

=== Peoria, Illinois ===
- "Prairie Fire That Wanders About" by Sufjan Stevens
- "Same Old Lang Syne" by Dan Fogelberg

=== Philadelphia, Pennsylvania ===
- "Dancing in the Street" by Martha and the Vandellas
- "I-76" by G. Love & Special Sauce
- "Bury me in Philly" by Dave Hause
- "Freedom of '76" by Ween
- "Fall in Philadelphia" by Hall & Oates
- "Goodbye Philadelphia" by Peter Cincotti
- "Is This America?" by Skyhooks
- "Lancaster Avenue Blues" by Mischief Brew
- "Miss Philadelphia" by Musiq Soulchild
- "Motownphilly" by Boyz II Men
- "Philadelphia" by Babehoven
- "Philadelphia" by Neil Young
- "Philadelphia Freedom" by Elton John
- "Philly Forget Me Not" by Hall & Oates
- "Punk Rock Girl" by The Dead Milkmen
- "Sailing to Philadelphia" by Mark Knopfler
- "Sit Down, John" from the musical 1776
- "Streets of Philadelphia" by Bruce Springsteen
- "Summertime" by DJ Jazzy Jeff & the Fresh Prince
- 'Sweet Little Sixteen" by Chuck Berry
- "Tenth Street" by Valencia
- "The Paris of Nowhere" by The Wonder Years
- "TSOP (The Sound of Philadelphia)" by MFSB
- "South Street" by The Orlons
- "Yo Home to Bel-Air" by DJ Jazzy Jeff & the Fresh Prince
- "You Got Me" by The Roots

=== Phoenix, Arizona ===
- "Is Anybody Goin' to San Antone?" by Charley Pride
- "Arizona" by Scorpions
- "Bobby in Phoenix" by Gorillaz
- "By the Time I Get to Phoenix" by Jimmy Webb
- "Phoenix" by Aimee Mann
- "Sunnyslope" by Fish Karma

=== Pittsburgh, Pennsylvania ===
- "31 (For Pittsburgh I Am Bound)" by Ceann
- "Black and Yellow" by Wiz Khalifa
- "I'll Get By in Pittsburgh" by Jona Lewie
- "I'm in Pittsburgh" by the Outcasts
- "Life During Wartime" by Talking Heads
- "Ode to Pittsburgh" by Loudon Wainwright III
- "Pittsburgh" by Mary Lou Williams, featuring Leon Thomas
- "Pittsburgh" by the Lemonheads
- "Pittsburgh" by Wilco
- "Pittsburgh Makes Me Drunk" by Ceann
- "Pittsburgh, Pennsylvania" by Guy Mitchell
- "Pittsburgh Sound (All in My Blood)" by Wiz Khalifa
- "Pittsburgh Town" by Pete Seeger
- "Six Days on the Road" by Dave Dudley

=== Pittsfield, Illinois ===
- "Pittsfield" by Sufjan Stevens

=== Portland, Maine ===
- "Nothing But Time" by Jackson Browne
- "Portland, Maine" by Tim McGraw
- "Portland Town" by Schooner Fare

=== Raleigh, North Carolina ===
- "Red Eye to Raleigh" by Mipso
- "Wagon Wheel" by Old Crow Medicine Show

=== Reidsville, North Carolina ===
- "Reidsville" by American Aquarium

=== Reno, Nevada ===
- "Reno Bound" by Southern Pacific
- "Folsom Prison Blues" by Johnny Cash
- "Don't go Down to Reno" by Tony Christie
- "All the Way to Reno (You're Gonna Be a Star)" by R.E.M.
- "Friend of the Devil" by The Grateful Dead
- "Reno, Reno, Reno" by Jonathan Richman
- "Reno Blues" by Willie Dixon
- "Palisades Park" by Counting Crows

=== Richmond, Virginia ===
- "Gibby" by Pat McGee Band
- "James River" by Cracker and Camper Van Beethoven
- "James River Blues" by Old Crow Medicine Show
- "Modern Day Bonnie and Clyde" by Travis Tritt
- "Rich Men North of Richmond" by Oliver Anthony
- "Richmond Is a Hard Road to Travel" (Union Civil War song based on "Jordan Is a Hard Road to Travel" by Dan Emmett)
- "Scuffle Town" by Avail
- "The Carolinian" by Chatham County Line
- "The Night They Drove Old Dixie Down" by The Band
- "Virginia Is for Lovers" by Mat Kearney
- "We Are Marching On to Richmond" a.k.a. "Our knapsacks sling" (Union Civil War song) words and music by E.W. Locke

=== Riverside, California ===
- "Socal Thugsta" by Saint Dog

=== Roanoke, Virginia ===
- "Wagon Wheel" by Darius Rucker

=== Rocky Top, Tennessee ===
- "Rocky Top" by Osborne Brothers

=== Sacramento, California ===
- "Arco Arena" by CAKE
- "Sacramento" by Middle of the Road

=== Saginaw, Michigan ===
- "America" by Simon & Garfunkel
- "Saginaw, Michigan" by Lefty Frizzell

=== Saint Louis, Missouri ===
- "Born in St. Louis" by Pokey LaFarge
- "Country Grammer" by Nelly
- "Heavy Metal Drummer" by Wilco
- "Louis to Frisco" by Chuck Berry
- "Meet Me in St. Louis, Louis"
- "Pruitt–Igoe" by Philip Glass
- "St. Louie" by Nelly
- "St. Louis" by the Easybeats
- "Saint Louis Blues" by W. C. Handy
- "Saint Louis Rag" by Tom Turpin

=== Salinas, California ===
- "Me and Bobby McGee"

=== Salt Lake City, Utah ===
- "Salt Lake City" by The Beach Boys
- "Salt Lake City" by The Dwarves
- "Salt Lake City" by Bob Weir

=== San Angelo, Texas ===
- "San Angelo" by Aaron Watson
- "San Angelo" by Marty Robbins
- "San Angelo" by Third Day

=== San Antonio, Texas ===
- "Across the Alley from the Alamo" by Bob Wills
- "Amarillo by Morning" by George Strait
- "China Grove" by The Doobie Brothers
- "Is Anybody Goin' to San Antone" by Charlie Pride
- "Folsom Prison Blues" by Johnny Cash
- "It Came from San Antonio" by Bruce Robison
- "Johnny Come Lately" by Steve Earle
- "Memo from Turner" by Mick Jagger
- "Memory Motel" by The Rolling Stones
- "New San Antonio Rose" by Bob Wills
- "Remember the Alamo" by George Strait
- "San Antonio" by Willie Nelson
- "San Antonio Rose" by Lee Ann Womack, and Willie Nelson & Ray Price
- "San Antonio Nights" by Eddy Raven
- "San Antonio Romeo" by Tish Hinojosa
- "San Antonio Stroll" by Tanya Tucker
- "San Antonio, TX" by Frank Black and the Catholics
- "San Antone" by Whiskeytown
- "What Am I Doing Hangin' 'Round?" by The Monkees

=== San Bernardino, California ===
- "San Ber'dino" by Frank Zappa
- "San Bernadino" by Christie

=== San Diego, California ===
- "Going to San Diego" by The Mountain Goats
- "Rosalita (Come Out Tonight)" by Bruce Springsteen
- "San Diego" by Blink-182
- "San Diego" by Burning Brides
- "San Diego Serenade" by Tom Waits
- "San Diego Zoo" by The 6ths
- "Surfin' U.S.A." by The Beach Boys

=== San Jose, California ===
- "Beach Baby" by The First Class
- "Canola Fields" by James McMurtry
- "Do You Know the Way to San Jose?" by Burt Bacharach and Hal David

=== Santa Cruz, California ===
- "Surfin' U.S.A." by The Beach Boys

=== Santa Fe, New Mexico ===
- "Amarillo by Morning" by George Strait
- "Drive By" by Train
- "Santa Fe" by Bon Jovi
- "Santa Fe" by The Bellamy Brothers
- "Santa Fe" by The Bluescasters
- "Santa Fe" by Beirut
- "Santa Fe" from Newsies
- "Santa Fe" from Rent
- "Santa Fe" by Bob Dylan
- "Me and My Uncle" by Grateful Dead
- "Oblivion" by Mudhoney
- "Gone to Santa Fe" by David Wilcox
- "Hair of Gold, Eyes of Blue" by Frank Sinatra
- "Coyote" by Better Than Ezra
- "G.I. Five" by Johnny Mercer
- "Lose That Girl" by Saint Etienne
- "New Mexico's no Breeze" by Iron & Wine
- "Midnight Train" by Charlie Daniels Band

=== Sausalito, California ===
- "Sausalito Summernight" by Diesel

=== Savannah, Georgia ===
- "The Moon over Georgia" by Shenandoah (band)
- "Savannah" by Relient K
- "West Savannah" by Outkast
- "Gump" by "Weird Al" Yankovic
- "Hard Hearted Hannah (The Vamp of Savannah)"
- "Savannah Nights" by Tom Johnston
- "Savannah Almost Killed Me" by American Aquarium

=== Shreveport, Louisiana ===
- "Shreveport" by Turnpike Troubadours

=== Simi Valley, California ===
- "Simi California" by Fisher

=== Sioux City, Iowa ===
- "Sioux City Sue" recorded by Gene Autry and others
- "Terminal Grain" by The Extra Lens

=== Springfield, Illinois ===
- "Springfield, or Bobby Got a Shadfly Caught in His Hair" by Sufjan Stevens
- "Springfield", mentioned in "(Get Your Kicks on) Route 66" by Perry Como

=== St. Paul, Minnesota ===
- "Big River" by Johnny Cash
- "Leader of the Band" by Dan Fogelberg
- "Me and You and a Dog Named Boo" by Lobo
- "Mister D.J." by the Charlie Daniels Band
- "Most of All" by B.J. Thomas

=== Statesboro, Georgia ===
- "Statesboro Blues" by The Allman Brothers Band

=== Tacoma, Washington ===
- "Rock'n Me" by Steve Miller Band
- "Thrice All-American" by Neko Case

=== Tallahassee, Florida ===
- "Tallahassee Lassie" by Freddy Cannon
- "Tallahassee" by The Mountain Goats
- "Tallahassee Tango" by Mephiskapheles

=== Telluride, Colorado ===
- "Telluride" by Tim McGraw

=== Thibodaux, Louisiana ===
- "Amos Moses" by Jerry Reed

=== Topeka, Kansas ===
- "Topeka" by Ludo

=== Tucson, Arizona ===
- "Closer" by The Chainsmokers
- "Get Back" by The Beatles
- "Goin' Back to Tucson" by The Supersuckers
- "Jack Straw" by Grateful Dead
- "Pray for Tucson" by Dave Hause
- "Send Me Down to Tucson" by Mel Tillis
- "Thumbelina" by The Pretenders
- "Tucson" by Euphoria
- "Tucson Arizona" by Link Wray
- "Tucson, Arizona (Gazette)" by Dan Fogelberg
- "Tucson, Arizona" by Rory Gallagher
- "Tucson Train" by Bruce Springsteen
- "Willin'" by Little Feat

=== Tucumcari, New Mexico ===
- "Il Treno a Tucumcari" by Bloodhorse
- "Tucumcari" by Cex
- "Tucumcari" by Freedy Johnston
- "Tucumcari" by Hugues Aufray
- "Tucumcari" by Jimmie Rodgers
- "Tucumcari" by Randy Kaplan
- "Tucumcari" by Goodnight, Texas
- "Tucumcari, Here I Come" by Dale Watson
- "Tucumcari Woman" by Dan Roberts
- "Two-Gun Harry from Tucumcari" by Dorothy Shay

=== Tulare, California ===
- "Tulare Dust" by Merle Haggard

=== Tulsa, Oklahoma ===
- "200 More Miles" by Cowboy Junkies
- "Almost to Tulsa" by Buddy Charleton
- "Convoy" by C.W. McCall
- "Don't Let the Sun Set on You in Tulsa" by Waylon Jennings
- "Don't Make Me Come to Tulsa" by Wade Hayes
- "Easton and Main" by the Turnpike Troubadours
- "Halfway to Tulsa" by Larry Sparks
- "Hang Me in the Tulsa County Stars" by John Moreland
- "Home Sweet Oklahoma" by Leon Russell
- "Jack Straw" by Grateful Dead
- "Last Trip to Tulsa" by Neil Young
- "Prisoner of the Highway" by Ronnie Milsap
- "Take Me Back to Oklahoma" by Chubby Checker
- "Take Me Back to Oklahoma" by Henson Cargill
- "Take Me Back to Tulsa" by Bob Wills
- "Tampa to Tulsa" by The Jayhawks
- "Tell Me Something Bad About Tulsa" by Merle Haggard
- "The Day That She Left Tulsa" by Wade Hayes
- "The Heart of Rock & Roll" by Huey Lewis and the News
- "The Tulsa Shuffle" by The Tractors
- "Tulsa" by Rufus Wainwright
- "Tulsa" by Wayne "The Train" Hancock
- "Tulsa" by Waylon Jennings
- "Tulsa Baby" by Dave Stogner
- "Tulsa County" by The Byrds
- "Tulsa Girl" by Dwight Twilley
- "Tulsa Heat" by John Moreland
- "Tulsa Queen" by Emmylou Harris
- "Tulsa Sounds Like Trouble to Me" by Shawn Camp
- "Tulsa Straight Ahead" by Jimmy Hall
- "Tulsa Telephone Book" by Tom T. Hall
- "Tulsa Time" by Don Williams and Eric Clapton
- "Tulsa Turnaround" by Kenny Rogers
- "24 Hours From Tulsa" by Gene Pitney
- "You're the Reason God Made Oklahoma" by David Frizzell & Shelly West
- "Where I Come from" by Alan Jackson
- "Rodeo" by Garth Brooks

=== Tupelo, Mississippi ===
- "Tupelo" by Nick Cave and the Bad Seeds
- "Tupelo" by John Lee Hooker

=== Twentynine Palms, California ===
- "29 Palms" by Robert Plant

=== Washington, D.C. ===
- "Banned in DC" by Bad Brains
- "The Bourgeois Blues" by Lead Belly
- "Caramel City" by Danko Jones
- "Chocolate City" by Parliament
- "The Community of Hope" by PJ Harvey
- "Near the Memorials to Vietnam and Lincoln" by PJ Harvey
- "The District Sleeps Alone Tonight" by The Postal Service
- "Don't Worry About the Government" by Talking Heads
- "Drop the Bomb" by Trouble Funk
- "Washington, D.C." by The Magnetic Fields
- "The Washington Post March" by John Philip Sousa
- "Fifteenth and T" by Swingin' Utters
- "And the Washington Monument Blinks Goodnight" by Q And Not U
- "Metro Song" by Remy Munasifi
- "Rock Creek Park" by The Blackbyrds
- "Washington D.C." by Gil Scott-Heron
- "Welcome to D.C." by Mambo Sauce
- "D.C. or Nothing" by Wale

=== Wichita, Kansas ===
- "Jack Straw" by Grateful Dead
- "Seven Nation Army" by White Stripes
- "True Dreams of Wichita" by Soul Coughing
- "Wichita" by Gillian Welch
- "Wichita" by Gretchen Peters
- "Wichita Ain’t So Far Away" by the Delines
- "Wichita Cathedral" by Butthole Surfers
- "Wichita Lineman" by Glen Campbell
- "Wichita Skyline" by Shawn Colvin

=== Wildwood, New Jersey ===
- "Wildwood Days" by Bobby Rydell

=== Winnemucca, Nevada ===
- "I've Been Everywhere" by Johnny Cash

=== Winslow, Arizona ===
- "Take It Easy" by The Eagles

=== Yonkers, New York ===
- "Put On Your Sunday Clothes" by Jerry Herman
- "Yonkers" by Tyler, the Creator

=== Youngstown, Ohio ===
- "Youngstown" by Bruce Springsteen

=== Ypsilanti, Michigan ===
- "Ypsilanti" by Washington Lee Osler
- "Born in a Trailer" by the Stooges
- "For the Widows in Paradise, For the Fatherless in Ypsilanti" by Sufjan Stevens
- "Ypsilanti" by Protomartyr
- "Ypsilanti Song" by The Ragbirds

== Uruguay ==
=== Montevideo ===
- "Montevideo" by Tabaré Cardozo
- "Montevideo" by Hansi Lang
- "La lluvia cae sobre Montevideo" by Los Traidores
- "Una canción para Montevideo" by Mauricio Ubal
- "Zafar" by La Vela Puerca

== Uzbekistan ==
=== Samarkand ===
- "Самарқанд" (Samarqand) by Nasiba Abdullaeva

== Venezuela ==
=== Caracas ===
- "Caminando por Caracas" by Piero De Benedictis

=== Cumaná ===
- "Maria Lionza" by Rubén Blades

== Vietnam ==
=== Hanoi ===
- "Hanoï" by La Grande Sophie
- "Vietnam Glam" by Indochine

=== Ho Chi Minh City (Saigon) ===
- "Born in the U.S.A." by Bruce Springsteen
- "Goodnight Saigon" by Billy Joel
- "Lies" by Thompson Twins
- "Saigon" by Martha and the Muffins
- "Saigon Bride" by Joan Baez
- "Still in Saigon" by the Charlie Daniels Band
- "Saigon" by Barry Sadler
- "Vietnam Glam" by Indochine
- "Vietnam Vet" by Johnny Hallyday
