= Lahore Lahore Aye =

Single by Tariq Tafu

from the album Naiyn Reesan Pakistan Diyyan
- Released: January 1, 2004
- Recorded: 2003
- Genre: Punjabi-Pop
- Length: 5:33
- Producer: Haroon (UK)

"Lahore Lahore Aye" (Punjabi: !لہور لہور ﺍﮰ, Urdu: !لاہور لاہور ہے, English: "Lahore is Lahore!") is a Punjabi song by Pakistani-Punjabi singer Tariq Tafu. The track reflects the unique culture of Lahore describing the life in Lahore, the people, the food, and the most famous spots in the city of Lahore, Pakistan. It was produced by Tariq Tafu for his album Naiyn Reesan Pakistan Diyan on January 1, 2004.

The song was a big commercial hit in Lahore as well as the whole of Pakistan. It was one of the top songs on Pakistani Music Charts. The song was a turning point in Tafu's career which gave him a boost on the Pakistani music scene.

== Phrase ==
One often comes across the popular phrase, "Lahore Lahore Aye" in Lahore as well as many other places in Pakistan. The possible reason behind it being the friendly, open-hearted and welcoming nature of Lahoris. Tafu chose the exact phrase as the title of his song and has given the words an entertaining melody. Tafu is also seen repeating the lines:

Punjabi	Romanized Punjabi	English
جینے لاہور نی تکیہ و جمیعا نی	Ho Jinnay L’ore naee Tak’ya o' Jam’ya naee	Who never saw Lahore, has never lived.

== Music video ==
Snapshot of the music video showing Tafu in front of Big Ben in London.

The music video directed by Ejaz Bhutta, instead of Lahore, is shot in the city of London with the reason behind it being, to familiarize the West and the overseas Desis with the city of Lahore. Tafu (in some places alone where in other places with a gathering of British people) is seen dancing crazy on the streets of London, making funny movements with and around Britons. Many people including Britons and Sikhs are seen repeating the phrase "Lahore Lahore Aye" throughout the song. Tafu is also seen pointing at some Lahori food in the song while singing about it. He tries to link the buildings and monuments of London with Lahore.
