= Menica Rondelly =

Occitan poet

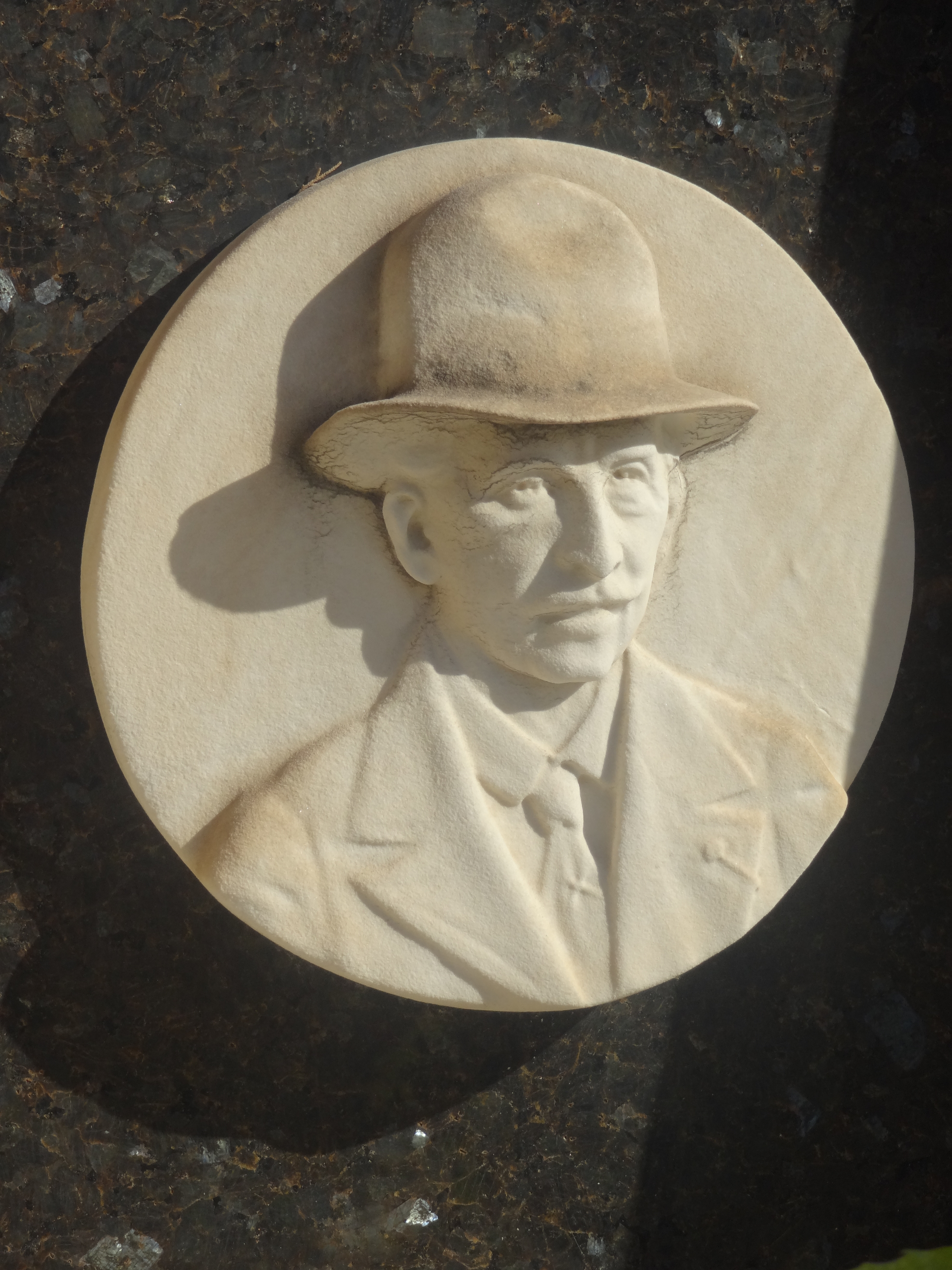
Menica Rondelly

Menica Rondelly (6 January 1854, Nice, Kingdom of Sardinia – 26 June 1935, Nice) was an Occitan poet.

He wrote hundreds of songs, plays, and other texts.
