= Birlikte =

Series of demonstrations against right-wing extremist violence in Cologne

- Genre: Cultural festival
- Frequency: Semi-annually
- Location: Cologne
- Country: Germany
- Inaugurated: 7 June 2014
- Most recent: 5 June 2016
- Website: http://birlikte.info

Birlikte is the name and motto of a series of semi-annual rallies and corresponding cultural festivals against right-wing extremist violence in Germany, which first took place on 9 June 2014 in Cologne. The term "birlikte" is Turkish and means "together" (German: "zusammen").

== Birlikte – Zusammenstehen: 7–9 June 2014 ==
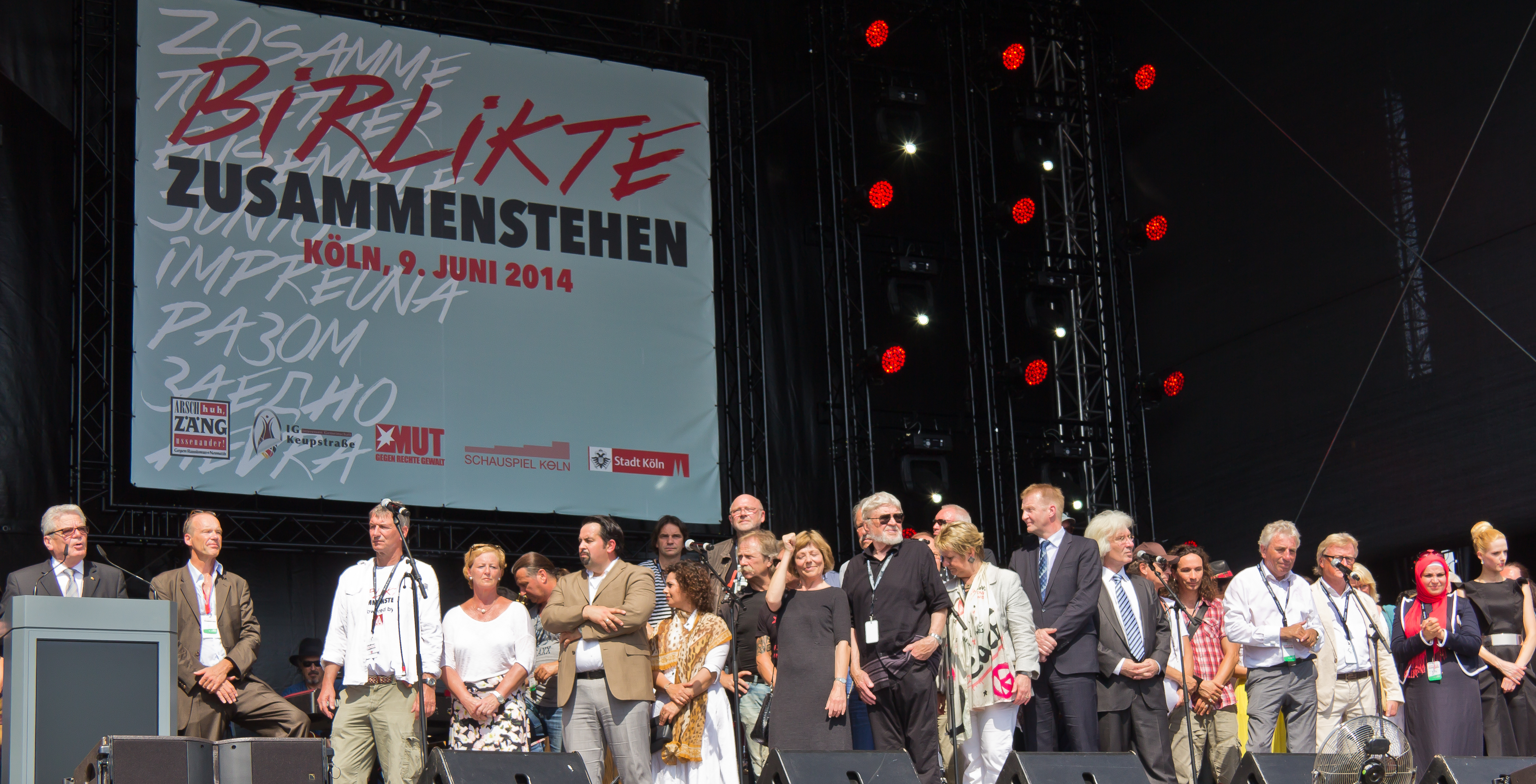
Speech by German Federal President Joachim Gauck with all participating speakers and artists on stage in 2014

The concept of a cultural festival named "Birlikte" was based on an idea by Mario Rispo, and was further developed and supported by the Cologne Arsch huh, Zäng ussenander (English: "Raise your ass, open your mouth!") campaign.

The first rally "Birlikte – Zusammenstehen" (English: "Birlikte – Standing together") was held on Whit Monday, 9 June 2014, on the occurrence of the tenth anniversary of the nail bomb attacks in Cologne. The festival deliberately took place at a spare area at Cologne's Schanzenstraße, near Keupstraße, the street, where the National Socialist Underground (German: Nationalsozialistischer Untergrund) (NSU) attacks had happened a decade earlier.

The event comprised a mixture of speeches and multi-cultural music performances. Among the planned speakers and musicians were Stefan Aust, Aynur Doğan, Stephan Bachmann, BAP and Wolfgang Niedecken, the Bläck Fööss, Andreas Bourani, Tom Buhrow, Clueso, Wilma Elles, Eko Fresh, Aladin El-Mafaalani, Tommy Engel and L.S.E., Sertab Erener and Demir Demirkan, Die Fantastischen Vier, Alexa Feser, Uli Hauser, Max Herre, Höhner, Ralf Jäger, the Kölner Jugendchor Sankt Stephan, Kasalla, Carolin Kebekus, Hardy Krüger senior, Udo Lindenberg, Zülfü Livaneli, Sylvia Löhrmann, Peter Maffay, Microphone Mafia, Giusi Nicolini (mayor of Lampedusa e Linosa), Bernhard Paul, Meral Sahin, Isabel Schayani, Wilfried Schmickler, Semiya Şimşek (the daughter of Enver Şimşek, the first victim of the NSU attacks), Serdar Somuncu, Atanasios Tsiolakidis, the Zeltinger Band, and the German Federal President Joachim Gauck, who opened the event.

Due to the severe supercell thunderstorm Ela the event had to be terminated prematurely, so that some of the planned guests could no longer perform. This included the solo performances of Udo Lindenberg and Peter Maffay. Parts of the abandoned performance of BAP including the approaching thunder storm were published on the 2014 album Niedeckens BAP: Das Märchen vom gezogenen Stecker - live (English: "The tale of the unplugged plug").

The rally was moderated by Sandra Maischberger and Fatih Çevikkollu. It was attended by a total of around 70000 people.

== Birlikte – Zusammenleben: 14 June 2015 ==
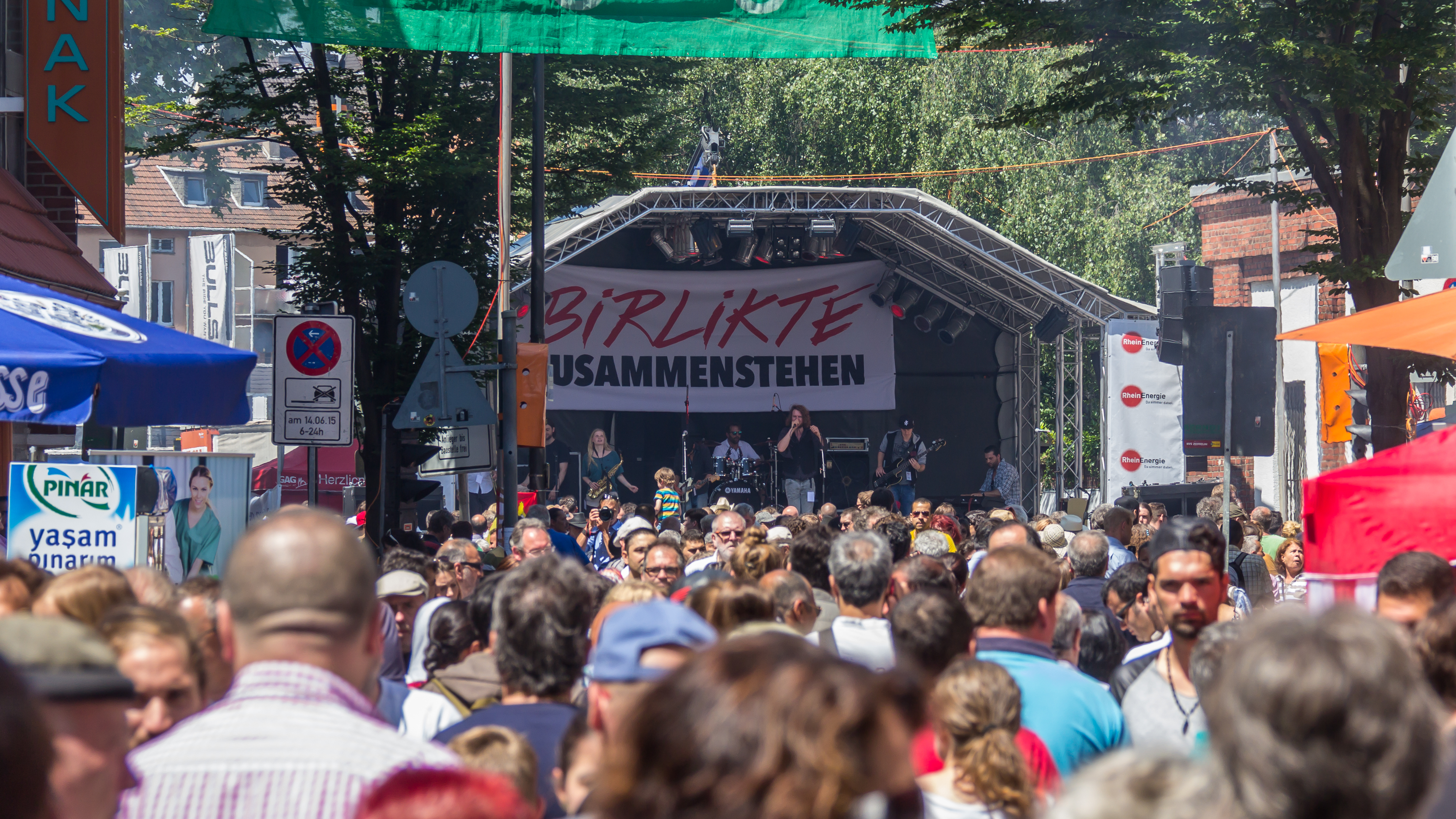
Birlikte visitors near the main stage at the Northern end of Keupstraße, Cologne

Originally planned as a one-time event only, the festival was repeated on 14 June 2015 under the modified motto "Birlikte – Zusammenleben" (English: "Birlikte – Living together") following continuing threats by right-wing rallies of Pegida and Kögida, but also, because the longwinded NSU trial still hadn't come to an end.

However, this time the event was limited to one day. Also, the organizers didn't rely on a large open-air stage as before, instead the number and size of the other stages was increased, so that effectively more people could participate in the festival compared to 2014. In total, over 500 local and over-regional artists performed on some 30 stages, including Brings, the Bläck Fööss, De Höhner, Eko Fresh, Cat Ballou, Kasalla, Mariama Kouyaté, Maryam Akhondy, the Microphone Mafia, Syavash Rastani Bandari Trance, Wolf Maahn and Jürgen Zeltinger.

The concert programme was accompanied by various other activities like theatre performances, speeches and public discussions at the Schauspiel Köln/Carlswerk and in the Keupstraße. Among the participants were Esther Bejarano, Fatih Çevikkollu, Lamya Kaddor, Navid Kermani, Rupert Neudeck and Guntram Schneider. According to the organizers, the estimated number of festival visitors was in the 70000s, similar to the numbers a year earlier.

The event started at 11 o'clock in the morning, the last performance ended at 23 o'clock.

== Birlikte – Zusammenreden: 27 May – 5 June 2016 ==
When the festival was held for the third time, this time under the motto "Birlikte – Zusammenreden" (English: "Birlikte – Talking together"), the programme was expanded to include a "week of dialogue" with various events distributed all over the city.

This started on 27 May 2016. The event week aimed at initiating a dialogue between the participants and artists, scientists, intellectuals and members of the city council on the possibilities how to improve ways of living together and to overcome cultural, religious and language barriers.

These activities peaked in a huge whole-day art and cultural festival and a central rally held at Keupstraße and at the Carlswerk on 5 June 2016. On 25 stages more than 400 artists should have performed. However, due to a severe weather warning, the main event in Köln-Mülheim had again to be cancelled at 16 o'clock already.

== See also ==
- Rock gegen Rechts
- Rock Against Racism
- Wir sind mehr
