= Arsch huh, Zäng ussenander =

Campaign against right-wing extremist violence in Cologne, Germany

Arsch huh, Zäng ussenander is the motto and name of a campaign against right-wing violence in Cologne, Germany. The colloquial slogan in the local dialect Kölsch literally means "Ass up, teeth apart", encouraging people to not look away but to stand up, speak out and take action against racism and injustice.

== History ==
=== 9 November 1992 ===
On 9 November 1992, about 100000 people gathered at Chlodwigplatz in Cologne following a call from artists from the Cologne music scene for a concert against racism and neo-nazism. This was preceded by a wave of xenophobic attacks, such as the Rostock-Lichtenhagen riots. "Wir […] wollen […] dazu beitragen, die weitverbreitete Sprachlosigkeit zu der Entwicklung in unserem Land zu beenden" (English: "We […] want to contribute to end the wide-spread speechlessness regarding the developments in our country"), the participating artists wrote in a pre-published statement for the major event. Despite far too lax security measures (nobody had expected the large number of participants), the rally took place without incident.

The title song was composed by Nick Nikitakis with lyrics contributed by Wolfgang Niedecken. The participating artists also sung it at the Heute die – morgen du! (English: "Them today – you tomorrow!") concert on 13 December 1992 in Frankfurt. It was selected for the annual German Liederbestenliste in 1993.

At the same time, the AG Arsch huh was founded, which has since repeatedly supported projects and initiatives against right-wing activities. For example, it supported the exhibition "Zwangsweise Kölsch" in 2000, which dealt with forced labor in Cologne during Nazi rule.

Among the participating artists and speakers were BAP, Kurt Bachmann, Jürgen Becker, Klaus Bednarz, Bläck Fööss, Viktor Böll, Brings, Rolly Brings, Charly T., EM:ZEH, Elke Heidenreich, Höhner, Jean Jülich, L.S.E., Willy Millowitsch, Nick Nikitakis, Samy Orfgen, 4 Reeves, Anke Schweitzer, The Piano Has Been Drinking, Triviatas – 1. Kölner Schwulenchor, Viva la Diva, Bernd Winterschladen and Zeltinger Band.

=== 20 September 2008 ===
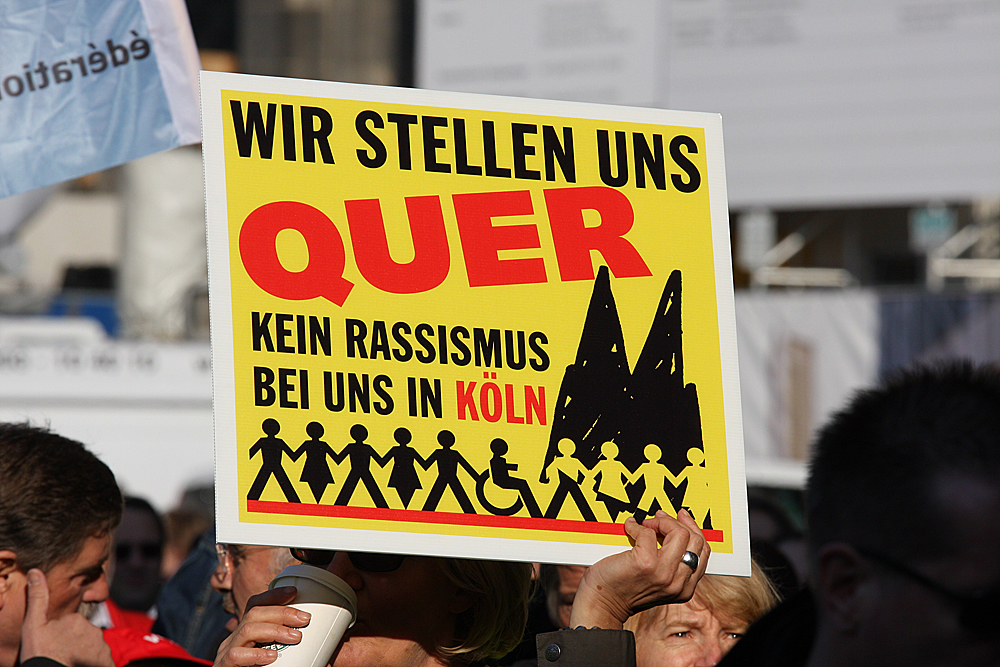
"Wir stellen uns quer. Kein Rassismus bei uns in Köln!" (English: "We stand opposed. We'll have no racism in Cologne!") poster on 20 September 2008

On 20 September 2008, a follow-up event was held sixteen years after the original "Arsch huh" concert under the revised motto "Köln stellt sich quer" at the Domplatte in Cologne.

This movement formed as a reaction to attempts of the politically right party Pro Köln to organize a gathering of European extreme-right groups in Cologne in a so-called "anti-islamization congress". The State Office for the Protection of the Constitution in NRW classifies Pro Köln as an extreme-right group.

Tens of thousands of people came together in the center of the city for a demonstration to protest right-wing extremism and neo-Nazism. Thereby, the planned right-wing gathering could be preempted and eventually prevented from occurring.

=== 9 November 2012 ===
The 20th anniversary of the original event was held on 9 November 2012 in the form of another rally and concert for social justice. The event took place at the "Deutzer Werft", a spare area between Deutzer Brücke and Severinsbrücke alongside the river Rhine. The number of visitors was in the 75000s.

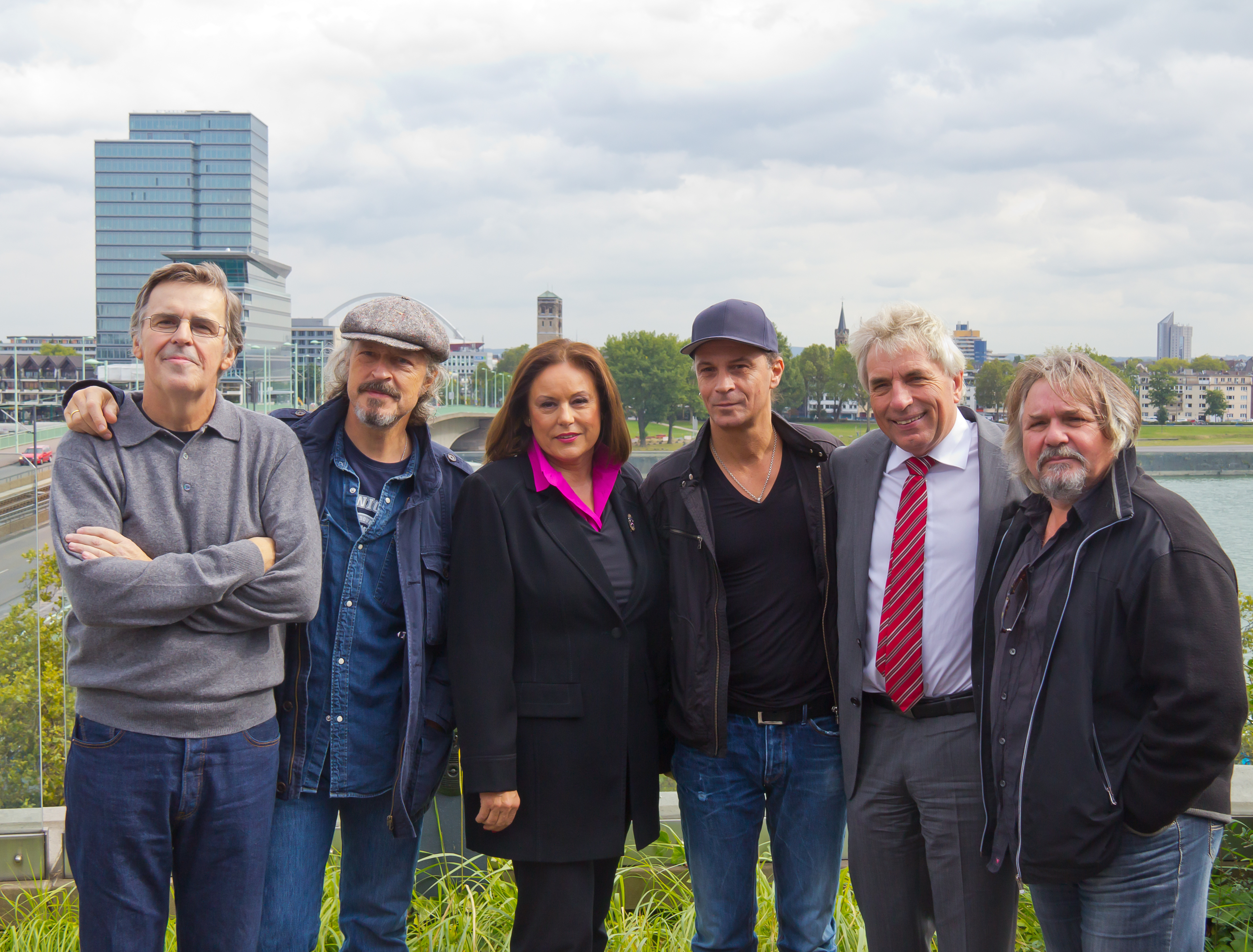
Press conference at rally regarding the 20th anniversary of "Arsch huh, Zäng ussenander" at Cologne Hotel Maritim with view at event area "Deutzer Werft": Karl-Heinz Pütz (organizer), Wolfgang Niedecken (musician), Monika Piel (director of WDR and chairwoman of ARD), Peter Brings (musician), Jürgen Roters (city mayor of Cologne), Tommy Engel (musician)

Participating artists and speakers were Özan Akhan, Athena, BAP, Dietmar Bär, Bläck Fööss, Brothers Keepers, Brings, Julius Brink, Chupacabras, Fatih Çevikkollu, Tommy Engel, Elke Heidenreich, Frank Hocker, Höhner, Hop-StopBanda, Kasalla, Carolin Kebekus, Klaus der Geiger, Köbes Underground, Gerd Köster, Helmut Krumminga, L.S.E., Sonia Mikich, Mariele Millowitsch, Nick Nikitakis, Wolfgang Niedecken, Walter Pütz, Karl-Heinz Pütz, Jonas Reckermann, 4 Reeves, Jürgen Roters, Peter Rüchel, Stephan Runge, Frank Schätzing, Wilfried Schmickler, Anke Schweitzer, Trovači, Viva la Diva, Claus Vinçon, Biggi Wanninger, Bernd Winterschladen, Ranga Yogeshwar, Zeltinger Band, two sign language translators and one hundred fifty "Trötemänner" (members of corps of drums).

== Albums ==
- Arsch huh, Zäng ussenander (1992) CD
- Arsch huh, Zäng ussenander – live (1992) CD
- Heimatklänge – Zehn Jahre »Arsch huh« (2002) CD
- Arsch huh, Zäng ussenander – Köln stellt sich quer! (2008) CD
- Arsch huh 2012 (2012) CD
- Su läuf dat he (2019)

== See also ==
- Gentleman (musician)
- Klee (band)
- Birlikte
- Rock gegen Rechts
- Rock Against Racism
- Wir sind mehr
- Kosmos Chemnitz - Wir bleiben mehr
