= Major Healey =

Major Healey may refer to:

- Major Healey (character), a character in the I dream of Jeannie television sitcom between 1965 and 1970
- Major Healey (musician), the nickname of the German rock guitarist and composer Klaus Heuser since 1980
