= Brings =

German rock and carnival band

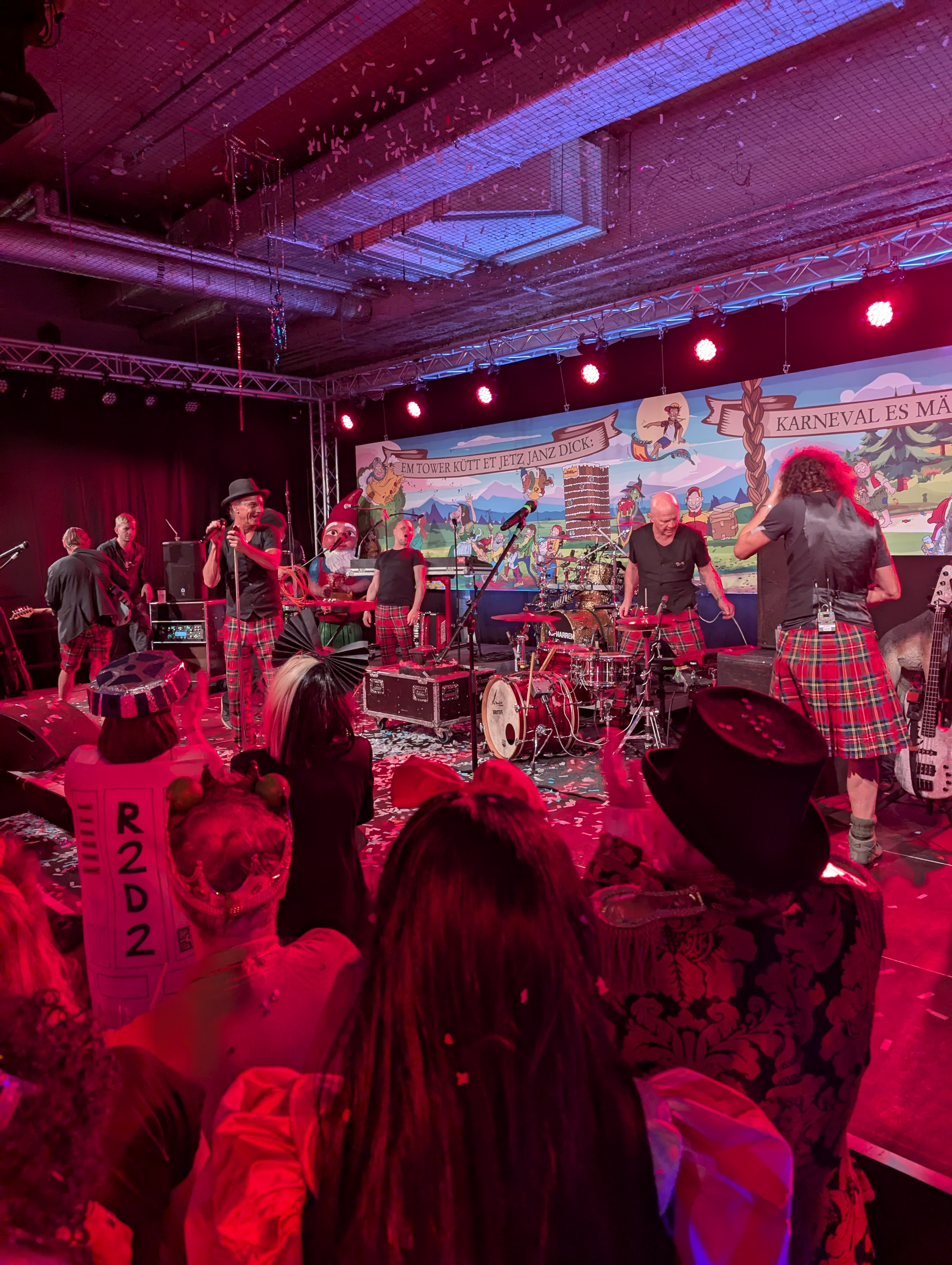

Background information
- Origin: Cologne, Germany
- Genres: Rock; carnival music; Electronic rock; Schlager
- Years active: 1991–present
- Members: Peter Brings (1990–present); Stephan Brings (1990–present); Harry Alfter (1990–present); Matthias Gottschalk (1990–1994); Christian Blüm (1994–present); Kai Engel (?–present)
- Website: www.brings.com

Brings (German: [bʁɪŋs], Colognian: [bʁéŋs]) are a band from Germany who perform most songs in the local dialect of Cologne, Kölsch. Founded in 1990, they established themselves playing rock music; their lyrics are performed in Kölsch and, since 1995, also in standard German. After the successful single Superjeilezick (2001) they specialized in Cologne party hits.

== History ==
Although the name resembles the German language equivalent of the imperative "bring it!", Brings is just the family name of three of the founders of the band, one of whom is also the band manager and father of two of the currently active members, Rolly Brings.

Brings was formed in 1990 by the brothers Peter and Stephan Brings, Harry Alfter and Matthias Gottschalk. Today, the formation consists of Peter Brings (vocals, guitar), Stephan Brings (bass, vocals), Kai Engel (keyboard, vocals), son of Tommy Engel, Harry Alfter (guitar, vocals) and Christian Blüm (drums).

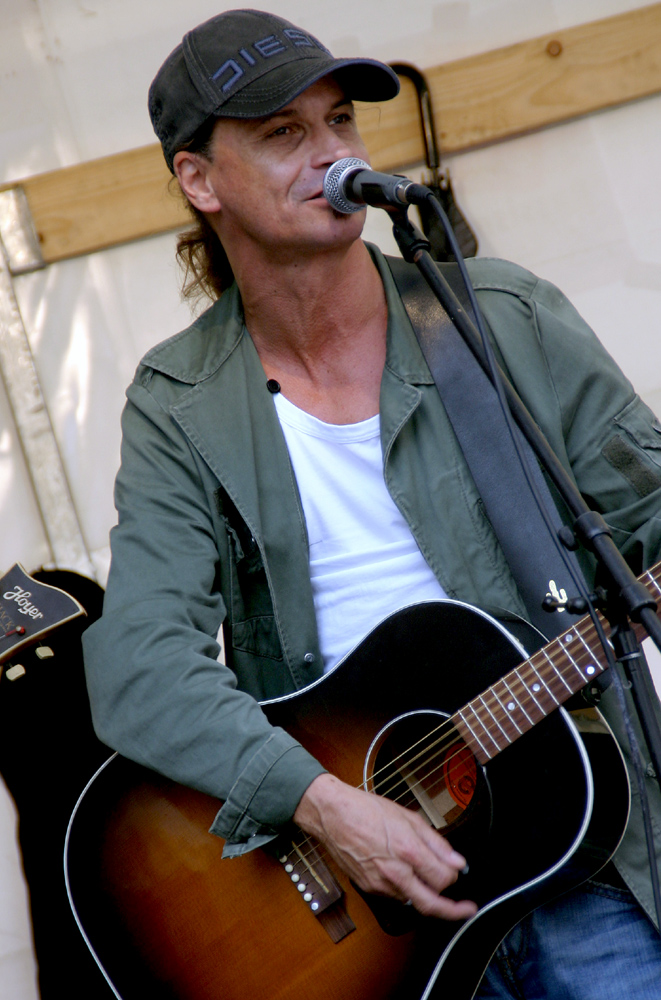
Peter Brings (2007)

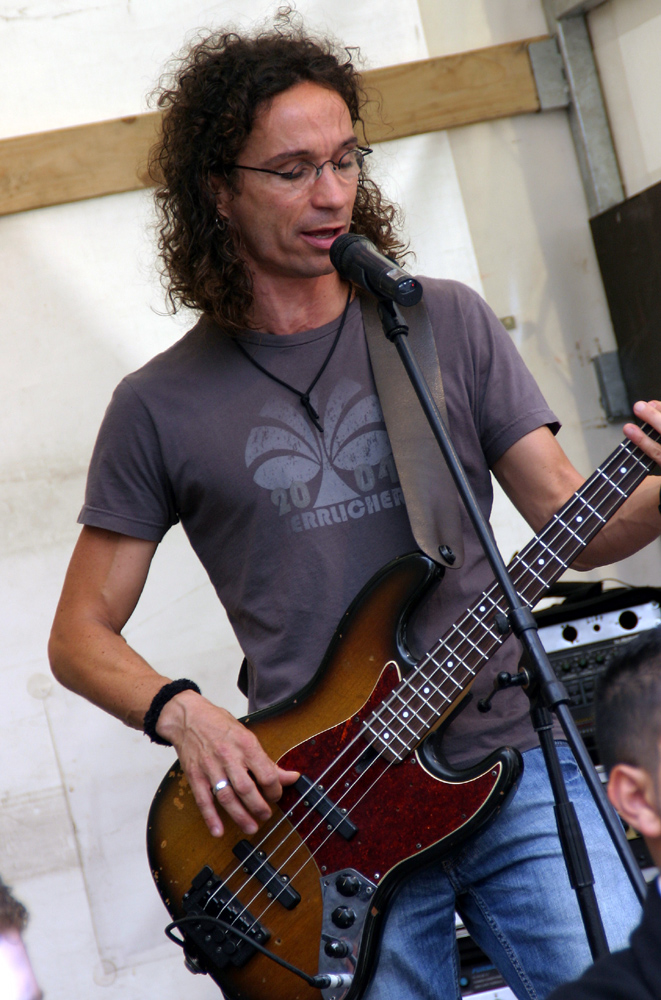
Stephan Brings (2007)

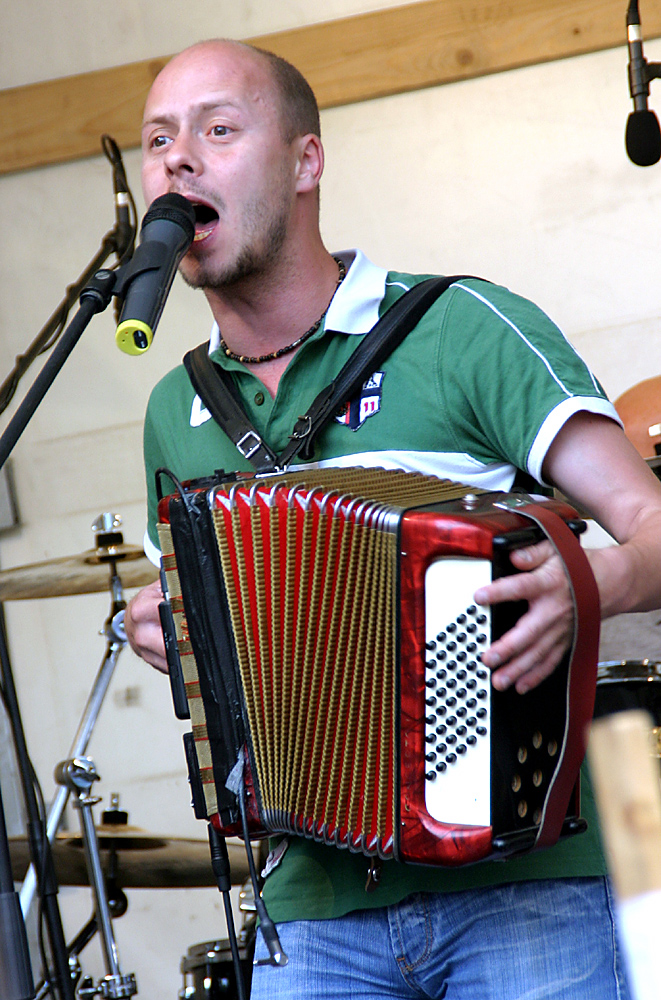
Kai Engel (2007)

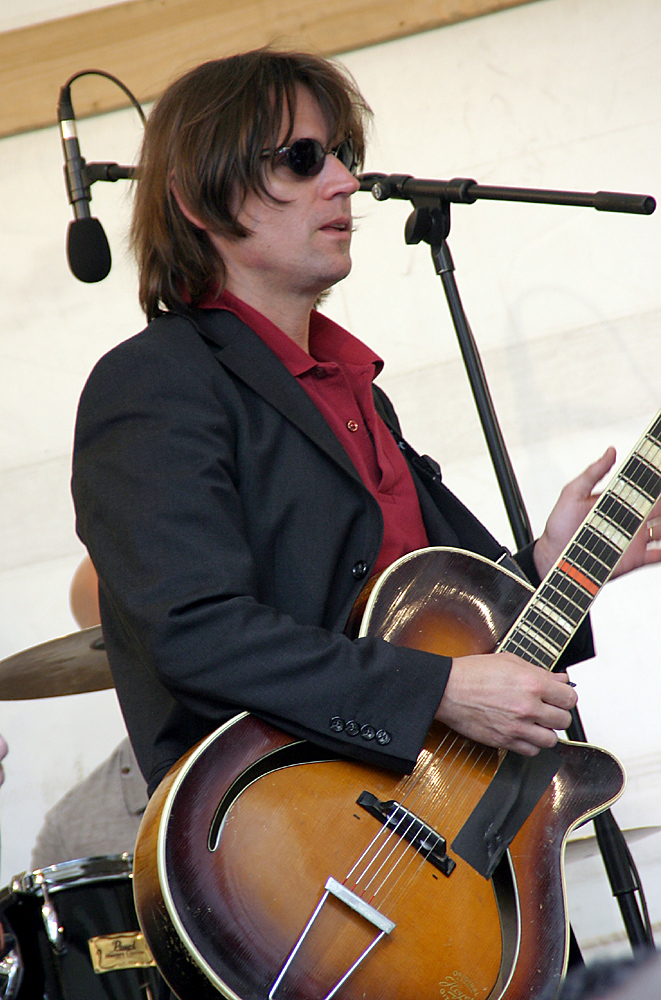
Harry Alfter (2007)

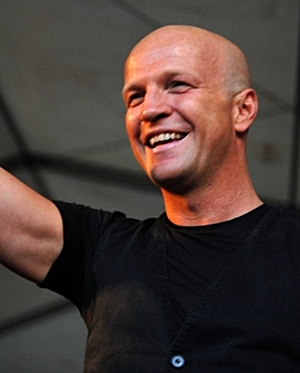
Christian Blüm (2007)

They debuted in 1991 with the album Zwei Zoote Minsche ("Two kinds of people") which was an attempt to distance themselves from the traditional Cologne carnival in order not to be pigeonholed. The single release Nur mer zwei ("Just the two of us") reached No. 56 in the German Charts. They played their first successful concerts, opened up for the Simple Minds, AC/DC, Tom Petty and performed at the rock festival Rock am Ring. In 1995, Brings began to publish albums not only in Kölsch but in standard German (Glaube, Liebe, Hoffnung – faith, love, hope).

Throughout their career, the band has been politically dedicated, one of the best known examples is their leading role in the Arsch huh, Zäng ussenander campaign against right-wing extremist violence in Germany. Their 1997 song Handvoll ze fresse (strong: "A handful to eat") broached the issue of refugees seeking a better life.

The 10th anniversary of the band came with some transitions – Brings broke up with their label (EMI) – and their next album and single release Superjeilezick brought a major style change. The song Superjeilezick ("Super cool times") was strongly inspired by Those Were the Days, but in Kölsch dialect and Brings started touring with other carnival bands like Höhner and Die Paveier. Leaving rock music behind, Brings eventually began focusing on carnival and party songs, a strategy that led to ultimate success, mainly in the Rhineland area.

In 2004, the song Poppe, Kaate, Danze ("Copulate, cards, dance") caused a small scandal in the rather conservative scene of the "official" Cologne carnival – however, attempts to censor the song or prevent the band to play it at carnival events were not successful.

Major successes of the following years were the singles Nur Nicht Aus Liebe Weinen (2007), a cover version of the Zarah Leander song, and Halleluja (2010). In 2011, the 15th album Dat is geil ("This is cool/hot") reached No. 7 of the German album charts. Anniversary concerts in 2011 and 2016 took place in the RheinEnergieStadion with 50000 fans.

== Discography ==
Brings discography
- Studio albums: 15
- Extended plays: 2
- Live albums: 5
- Compilation albums: 5
- Singles: 45
- Video albums: 2
- Music videos: 13
- Box set: 1
- Audio books: 1

=== Records ===
==== Studio records ====
Year	Album	Charts/Awards (DE)	Release
1991	Zwei Zoote Minsche	—	1991-01-28
1992	Kasalla	61 (9 weeks)	1992-05-21
1993	Hex 'n' Sex	68 (9 weeks)	1993-06-24
1995	Glaube, Liebe, Hoffnung	72 (7 weeks)	1995-06-22
1997	Fünf	—	1997-08-22
1999	Knapp	61 (3 weeks)	1999-01-11
2001	Superjeilezick	40 (7 weeks)	2001-01-29
2003	Puddelrüh	32 (3 weeks)	2003-02-10
2004	Poppe, Kaate, Danze	86 (1 week)	2004-01-12
2005	Su lang mer noch am Lääve sin	82 (3 weeks)	2005-01-03
2007	Hay! Hay! Hay!	89 (1 weeks)	2007-01-12
2008	Rockmusik	89 (2 weeks)	2008-11-21
2011	Dat is geil	7 (3 weeks)	2011-07-15
2014	14	35 (4 weeks)	2014-12-05
2017	Liebe gewinnt	50 (2 weeks)	2017-12-01

==== Live recordings ====
Year	Album	Charts/Awards (DE)	Release
2011	Dat wor geil – 20 Jahre Brings	38 (2 weeks)	2011-11-25
2012	Leise rieselt der Schnee	44 (1 week)	2012-11-23
2016	Silberhochzeit live	see Silberhochzeit	2016-11-25

More live albums

- 1997: Live
- 2013: Leise rieselt der Schnee 2

==== Compilations ====
Year	Album	Charts/Awards (DE)	Release
2016	Silberhochzeit	9 (8 weeks)	2016-06-03

Other compilations

- 2007: Das Beste von 90–97
- 2007: Best Of
- 2011: Das brings – Die Hits der Kölner Kultband
- 2011: Classic Albums: Glaube, Liebe, Hoffnung/5 + 4

==== EPs ====
- 1991: Zweschedurch
- 1996: Zweschedurch II

=== Singles ===
==== Charts ====
Year	Song	Album	Charts/Awards (DE)	Release (Sales)
1991	Nur mer zwei	Zwei Zoote Minsche	56 (12 weeks)	1991
2000	Superjeilezick	Superjeilezick	50 (21 weeks)	2000-01-13
2002	Wenn et funk	N/A	74 (5 weeks)	2002-01-07
2003	Puddelrüh	Puddelrüh	64 (5 weeks)	2003-01-06
2003	Poppe, Kaate, Danze	Poppe, Kaate, Danze	82 (1 week)	2003-11-10
2004	Su lang mer noch am Lääve sin	Su lang mer noch am Lääve sin	61 (7 weeks)	2004-11-08
2005	Man müsste noch mal 20 sein	Su lang mer noch am Lääve sin	70 (2 weeks)	2005-06-06
2006	Fußball ist unser Leben	Hay! Hay! Hay!	57 (4 weeks)	2006-03-03
2007	Nur nicht aus Liebe weinen	Rockmusik	34 (13 weeks)	2007-11-02
2010	Halleluja	Dat is geil	23 (11 weeks)	2010-01-08
2010	Wir wollen niemals auseinandergeh’n	Dat is geil	89 (1 week)	2010-11-05
2012	Dat is geil	Dat is geil	85 (1 week)	2012-01-20
2013	Funkemarieche	N/A	73 (1 week)	2013-02-08 feat. Carolin Kebekus
2013	Kölsche Jung	14	26 (Gold) (13 weeks)	2013-11-08 (150000+ sales)
2015	Polka Polka Polka	14	19 (Gold) (5 weeks)	2015-02-27 (200000+ sales)
2016	Jeck Yeah!	Silberhochzeit	48 (2 weeks)	2016-01-29

==== Other singles ====
- 1991: Katharina
- 1991: Schenk dir mi Hätz
- 1992: Ali
- 1992: Loss di Hoor eraf
- 1992: Nix is verjesse
- 1993: Du bist
- 1993: Ehrenfeld
- 1993: Lass die Maske fallen
- 1993: Will nur dich
- 1995: Fleisch und Blut
- 1995: Heimat
- 1995: Luftschlösser
- 1997: Bis ans Meer
- 1997: Niemols im Lääve/Bis ans Meer
- 1997: Fünf
- 1999: Nit alles Jold
- 1999: Was ist mit dir?/Marie
- 1999: Knapp
- 2004: Lang vorbei/Schnee vum letzte Johr
- 2005: Alle Mann
- 2005: Hoch, Höher, Haie
- 2006: Hay! Hay! Hay!
- 2008: FC is unser Jeföhl
- 2010: Plastikstään
- 2011: Die längste Brings Single der Welt
- 2012: Halleluja (feat. Lukas Podolski)
- 2013: Die Nacht
- 2014: Es brennt (Eko Fresh feat. Brings)
- 2017: Et jeilste Land (feat. Dennis aus Hürth)
- 2019: Hück räänt et Kölsch (111-RMX)

=== Videos ===
==== Video records ====
- 2007: Live
- 2011: Dat wor geil – 20 Jahre Brings

==== Music videos ====
Year	Title	Directors
1991	Schenk dir mi Hätz	
1992	Nix is verjesse	
1993	Will nur dich	
1995	Heimat	
	Luftschlösser	
2005	Man müsste noch mal 20 sein	John Kolya Reichart, Carsten Simon
2010	Halleluja	
2012	Dat is geil	
	Halleluja (2012)	
2013	Kölsche Jung	Richard Huber
2014	Es brennt	
2015	Polka Polka Polka	
2016	Jeck Yeah!	

=== Box sets ===
- 2011: 4 Alben

== See also ==
- Bläck Fööss
- Klaus Heuser
