= Temme =

Temme is a surname. Notable people with the surname include:

- Edward Harry Temme (1904–1978), English swimmer and insurance clerk
- Roland "Balou" Temme (1953–2021), German music manager and concert promoter

== See also ==
- Temmes
