= Roland Temme =

German music manager (1953–2021)

- Temme at Birlikte 2014
- Born: December 20, 1953
- Died: August 6, 2021 (aged 67)
- Occupations: music manager and concert promoter

Roland "Balou" Temme (20 December 1953 – 6 August 2021) was a German music manager and concert promoter.

== Career ==
Temme grew up in Emmerich am Rhein and graduated from the local Willibrord-Gymnasium. From 1981 he worked for the Cologne band BAP, first as a tour manager, then as an organizer and until 1999 as a manager. Since the early 1980s he has organized numerous concerts with his own companies, including the 1992 and 1999 stadium tours by Marius Müller-Westernhagen. For many years he was considered one of the most influential entrepreneurs in the field of music events and worked with artists such as Peter Maffay, Udo Lindenberg and André Rieu. He also organized the Christmas market at Cologne Cathedral. He campaigned against right-wing extremism with art and cultural festivals.

On 4 April 2016, Roland Temme received the Live Entertainment Awards (LEA) jury prize together with Udo Lindenberg in Frankfurt am Main.

As part of his entrepreneurial activities, Temme was, among other things, the main investor and co-managing director of the Charlotte ice cream factory, which was founded in St. Wendel in 2016. After Temme's sudden and unexpected death, the company went into financial difficulties, which ultimately led to the company's insolvency.
