= Wolfgang Niedecken =

German musician (born 1951)

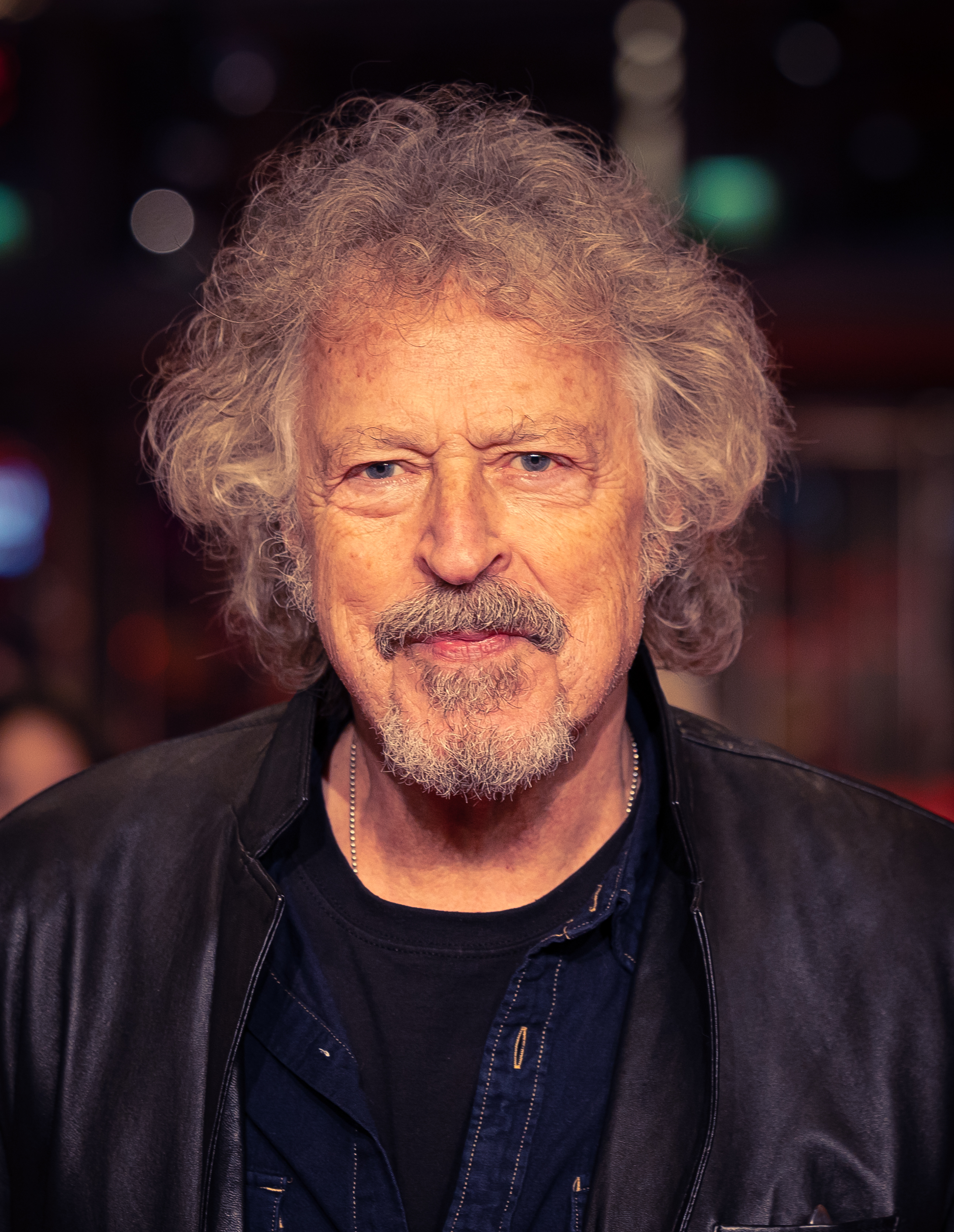
- Niedecken in 2025

Background information
- Born: 30 March 1951 (age 75); Cologne, West Germany
- Genres: Rock
- Occupation: Musician
- Instruments: Vocals, guitar
- Years active: 1976–present
- Website: bap.de

Wolfgang Niedecken (German: [ˈvɔlfɡaŋ ˈniːdɛkn̩], Colognian: [ˈvôlfjaŋ ˈnîdɛkən]; born 30 March 1951) is a German singer and musician. He founded the Kölsch-speaking rock group BAP at the end of the 1970s and soon became famous with BAP all over Germany. He is the lead singer and only constant member of BAP.

== Biography ==
Niedecken attended boarding school in Rheinbach from 1961 to 1970. From 1966 onwards, he played in the school band The Convikts and The Troop. He studied art at the Cologne University of Applied Sciences, graduating in 1974 after a short-term exchange in New York with Howard Kanovitz and Larry Rivers. He remains an active painter who both designs most of the covers of the BAP albums and holds exhibitions of his work.

He suffered a stroke on 3 November 2011. As a consequence, BAP's concert dates were cancelled and the tour rescheduled, with the first performance on 3 May 2012.

Niedecken is an avid campaigner for political and social causes. He was one of the initiators of the 1992 event Arsch huh, Zäng ussenander (literally: Get off your arse and open your mouth), an open-air concert in Cologne against racism. In 2002, he campaigned for a continuation of the "red-green" (SPD and The Greens) coalition in the German parliament. He was also goodwill ambassador of the aid organisation Gemeinsam für Afrika (Together for Africa) from 2004 to 2005.

Niedecken played a live concert with the band Bläck Fööss in the Millowitsch-Theater in Cologne. This concert was released on the double CD Bläck Fööss & Fründe (literally: Bläck Fööss and friends). Niedecken and Leopardefell were also the backing musicians on Bruce Springsteen's hit "Hungry Heart" when it was re-released in 1995 and featured in the video which was shot in a bar in Berlin.

== Discography ==
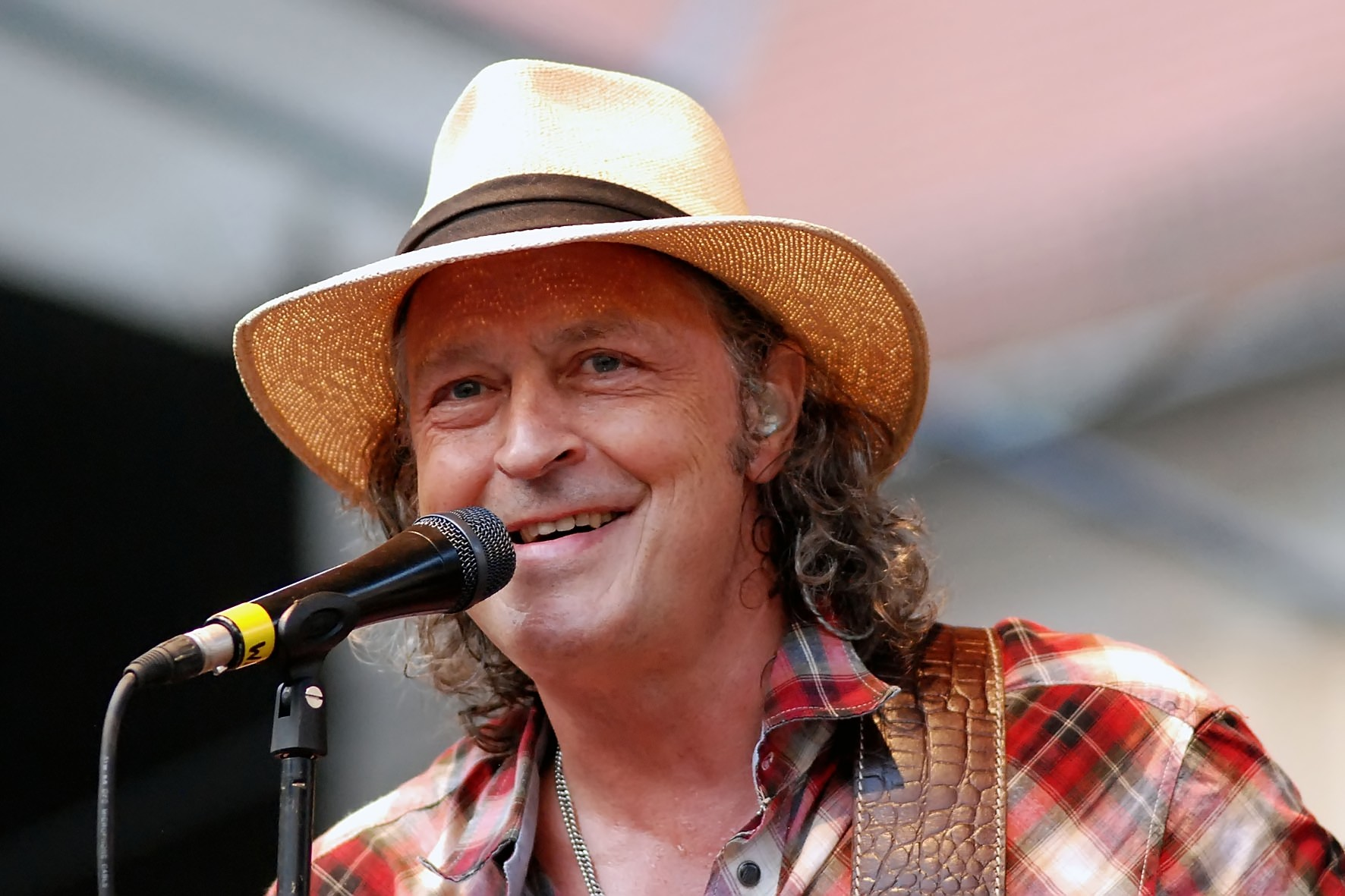
Niedecken in 2009

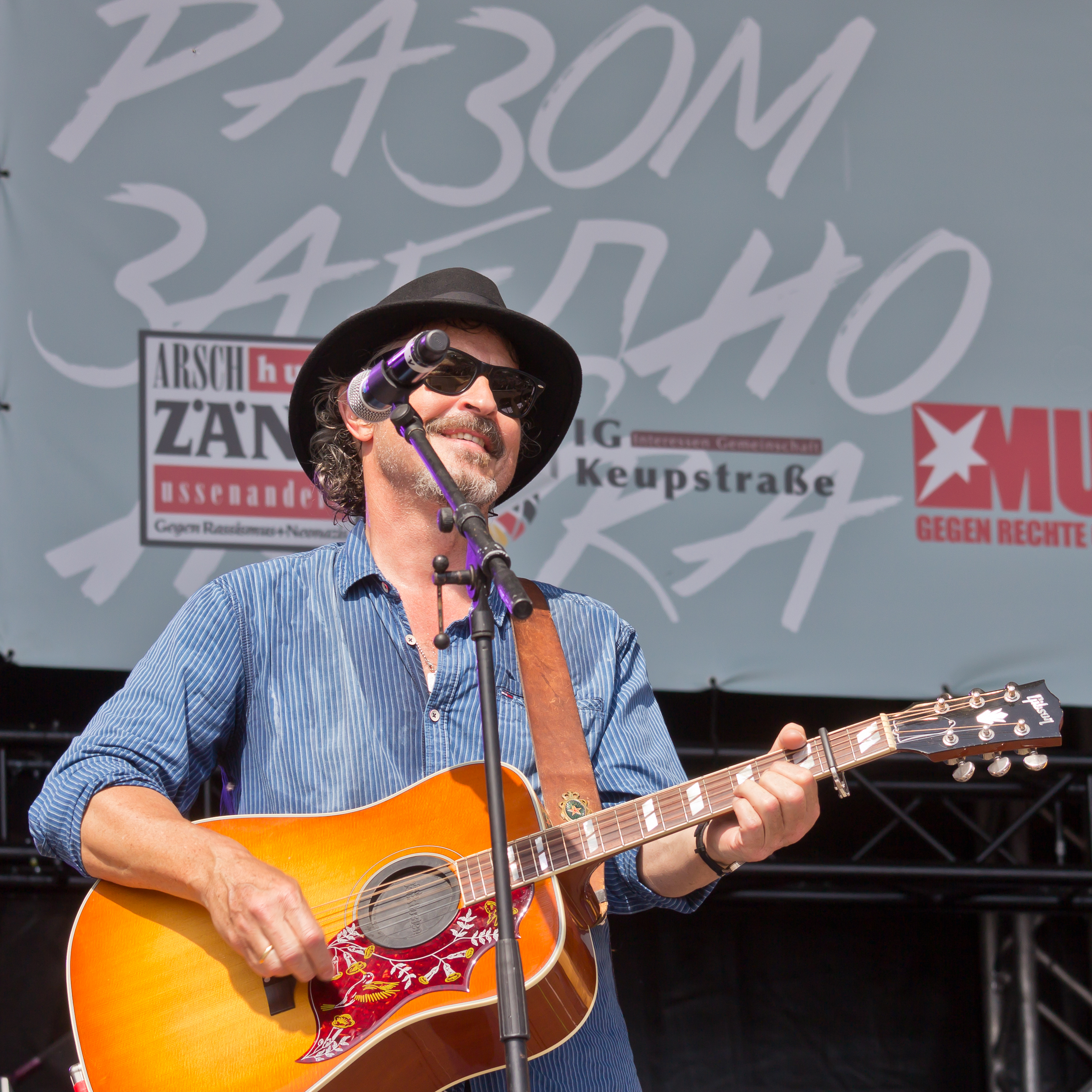
Niedecken in 2014

=== Solo albums ===
- 1987: Schlagzeiten (A play on words on the German word for headlines with the lines part being replaced by the German word for times)
- 1995: Leopardefell (literally: Leopard skin – an album of German cover versions of Bob Dylan songs, where Niedecken firms as "Wolfgang Zimmermann")
- 2004: NiedeckenKöln together with the WDR Big Band
- 2013: Zosamme Alt (old songs in new recorded versions except for one new song)
- 2017: Reinrassije Stroossekööter – das Familienalbum ("Thoroughbred Mongrels – The Family Album")
- 2022: Dylanreise

=== With BAP ===
See BAP

=== With other artists ===
- Bläck Fööss: "Bläck Fööss & Fründe" (literally: Bläck Fööss and friends)

== Awards ==
Niedecken received the Frankfurter Musikpreis ("Music Award of Frankfurt") in 1996
