= BAP (German band) =

Colognian-German-dialect rock music group (formed 1976)

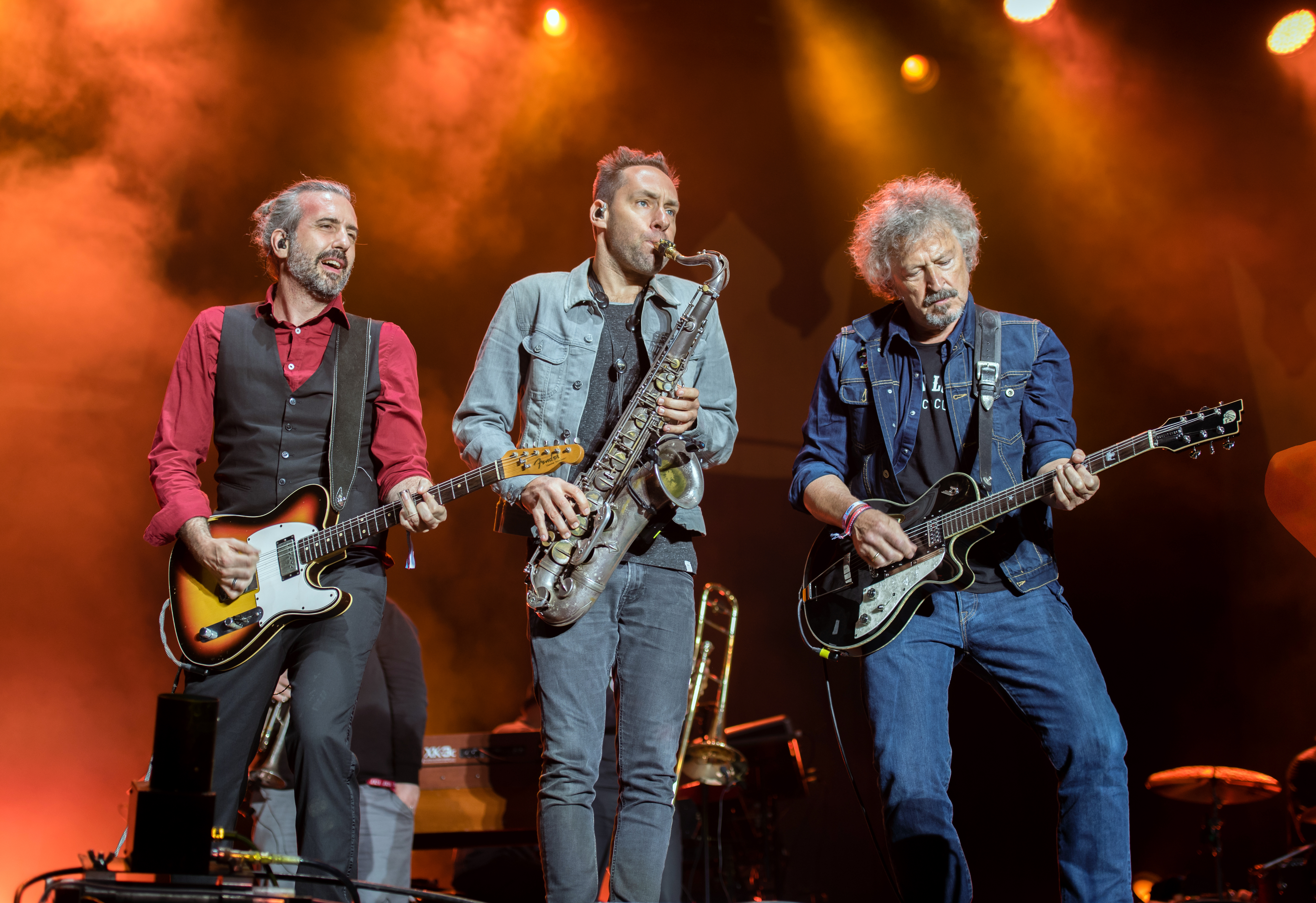
- BAP performing in 2018

Background information
- Origin: Cologne, Germany
- Genres: Rock
- Years active: 1976–present
- Labels: EMI, Capitol
- Members: Wolfgang Niedecken; Werner Kopal; Michael Nass; Anne de Wolff; Ulrich Rode; Sönke Reich; Axel Müller; F. Johannes Goltz; Benny Brown
- Past members: See below
- Website: bap.de

BAP (German pronunciation: [bap]) is a German rock band. With thirteen albums reaching the number one in the German record charts, BAP is one of the most successful rock acts in their home country.

Nearly all of BAP's lyrics are written in Kölsch, the dialect of Cologne, or more precisely in a Kölsch-influenced derivation of Eifelplatt, a regional variant of the Ripuarian language spoken in the nearby rural Eifel. Niedecken's most prominent musical influences, especially early in his career, were Bob Dylan, the Kinks, Bruce Springsteen, the Rolling Stones and Wolfgang Ambros.

== History ==
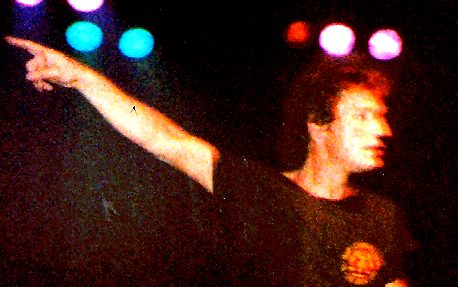
Wolfgang Niedecken, 1984

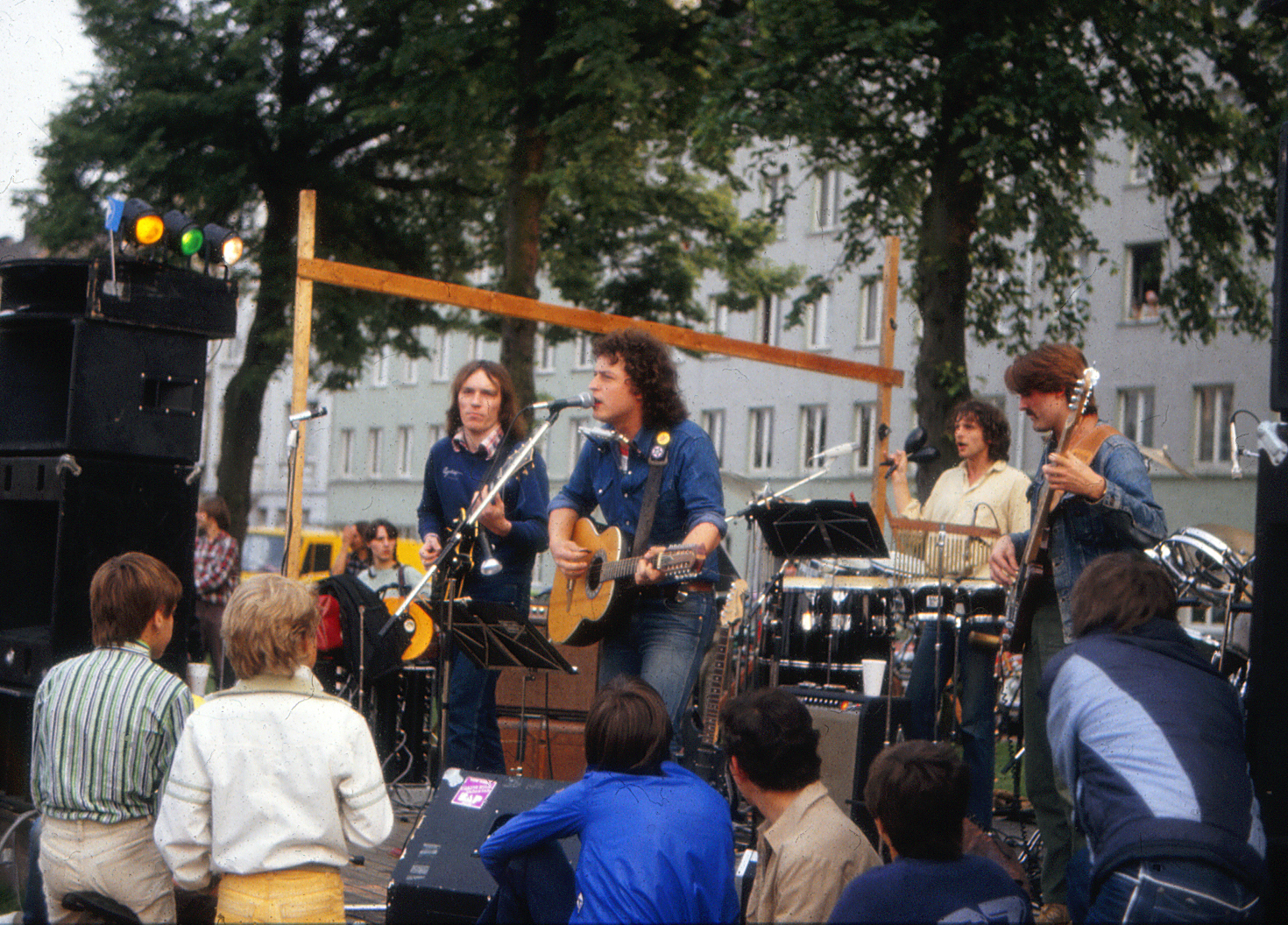
BAP in Aachen, 1980

The group was founded in 1976 under the name Wolfgang Niedecken's BAP in Cologne by Wolfgang Niedecken and Hans Heres. In 1981, they released their most famous song "Verdamp lang her" (Damn long time ago), in which Niedecken describes regrets he has about his relationship with his then recently deceased father. The band's name "BAP" derived from "BAPP", both, a play-on-words on the Kölsch word "Papp" (related to the German word dad), but pronounced differently, and Niedecken's then-nickname.

Niedecken translated a collection of Bob Dylan's lyrics to German for his 1995 solo album Leopardefell.

== Band members ==
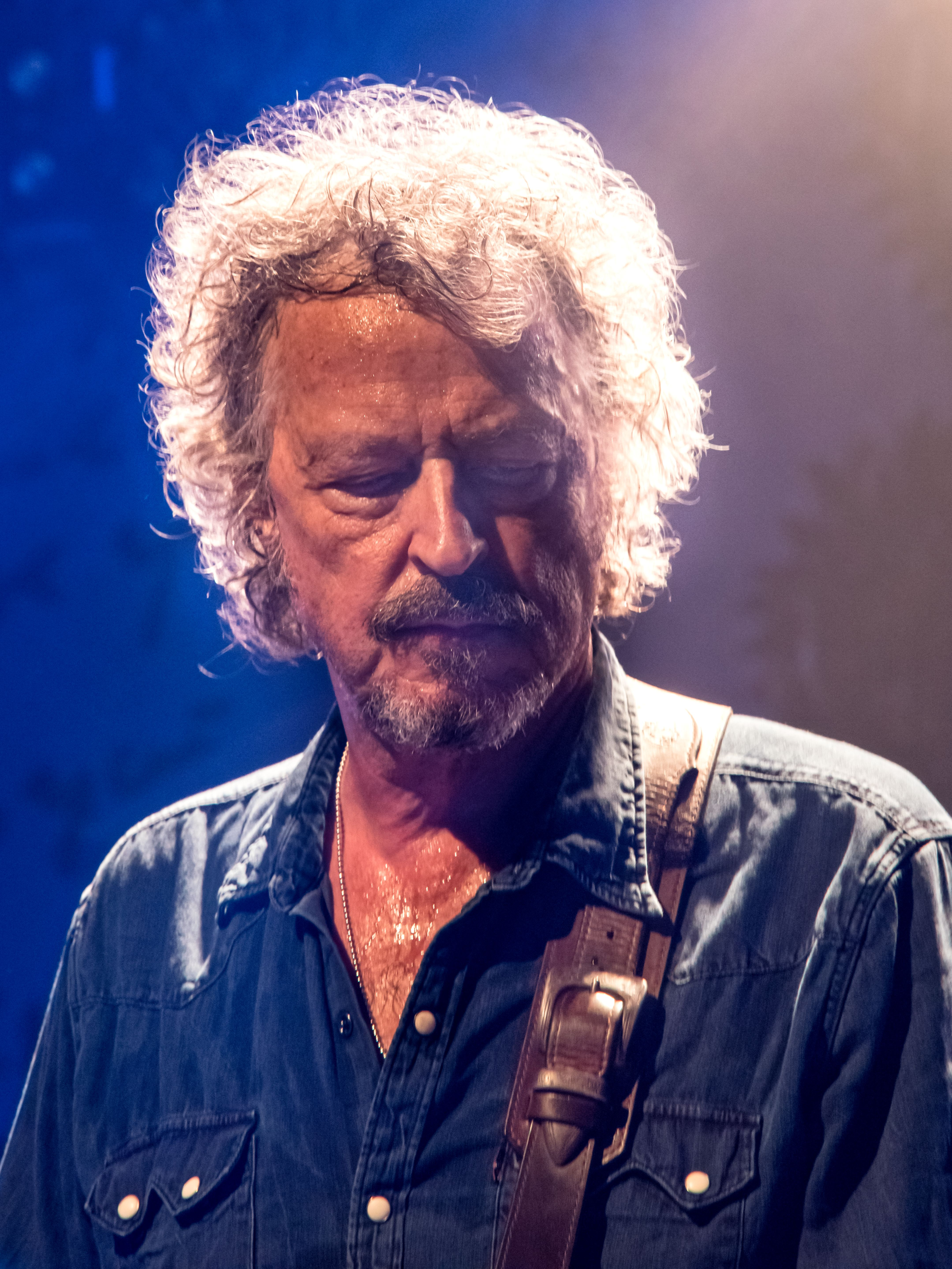
Zelt-Musik-Festival 2016 in Freiburg, Germany

=== Current members ===
(Information valid for 2024)

- Wolfgang "Maître" Niedecken – singer (1976–present)
- Werner Kopal – bass (1996–present)
- Michael Nass – keyboards (1999–present)
- Anne de Wolff – violin, viola, cello, percussion, guitar, trombone (2014–present, as guest 2006–2014)
- Ulrich "Uli" Rode – guitar (2014–present)
- Sönke Reich – drums (2014–present)
- Axel Müller – saxophone, guitar, duduk, flutes (2018–present)
- Franz Johannes Goltz – trombone (2018–present)
- Benjamin "Benny" Brown – trumpet, flügelhorn (2022–present)

=== Former members ===
- "Afro" Bauermann – percussion (1976–1977)
- Rainer "Saxello" Gulich – saxophone (1976–1977)
- Hans "Honçe" Heres – guitar (1976–1980)
- Klaus Hogrefe – bass (1976–1978)
- Wolfgang "Wolli" Boecker – drums (1976–1983)
- Manfred "Schmal" Boecker – percussion (1976–1995)
- Wolfgang "Gröön" Klever – bass (1978–1980)
- Bernd Odenthal – keyboards (1978–1980)
- Fritz Kullmann – saxophone (1980)
- "Steve Borg" (Stephan Kriegeskorte) – bass (1980–1995)
- Klaus "Major" Heuser – guitar (1980–1999)
- Hans "Fonz" Wollrath – sounds (1980–1999)
- Alexander (Axel) "Tschaikägo" "Effendi" Büchel – keyboards (1981–1999)
- Jan-Christoph Dix – drums (1983–1985)
- Pete King – drums (1986)
- Jürgen Zöller – drums (1987–2014)
- Mario Argandoña – percussion (1996–1997)
- Jens Streifling – saxophone (1996–2002)
- Sheryl Hackett – percussion (1999–2003)
- Helmut Krumminga – guitar (1999–2014)
- Rhani Krija – percussion (2014–2016, as guest 2008–2014)
- Christoph Moschberger – trumpet (2018–2022)

== Albums ==
- 1979: Wolfgang Niedecken's BAP rockt andere kölsche Leeder [Wolfgang Niedecken's BAP rocks different Colognian songs]
- 1980: Wolfgang Niedecken's BAP: Affjetaut [Defrosted]
- 1981: Für usszeschnigge! [For cutout]
- 1982: Vun drinne noh drusse [From the inside to the outside]
- 1983: Live – bess demnähx... [Live – So long...]
- 1984: Zwesche Salzjebäck un Bier [Between pretzels and beer]
- 1985: Kristallnacht [Crystal night] (UK Sampler)
- 1986: Ahl Männer, aalglatt [Old slick men]
- 1988: Da Capo
- 1990: X für 'e U [Putting something over on someone]
- 1991: ...affrocke!! (Live) [...Rocking Out!!]
- 1993: Pik Sibbe [Seven of Spades]
- 1995: Wahnsinn – Die Hits von 79–95 [Frenzy – The hits of 1979–1995]
- 1996: Amerika [America]
- 1999: Comics & Pin-Ups
- 1999: Tonfilm [Talking movie]
- 2001: Aff un zo [Every now and then]
- 2002: Övverall (Live) [Everywhere]
- 2004: Sonx [Songs]
- 2005: Dreimal zehn Jahre [Thrice ten years]
- 2008: Radio Pandora (plugged + unplugged)
- 2009: Live und in Farbe (Live) [Live and in color]
- 2011: Halv su wild [No big deal; literally: Half as wild]
- 2011: Volles Programm (Live) [Full programme]
- 2014: Niedeckens BAP: Das Märchen vom gezogenen Stecker – live [The tale of the unplugged plug]
- 2016: Niedeckens BAP: Lebenslänglich [Lifelong]
- 2016: Die beliebtesten Lieder 1976–2016 [The most popular songs 1976–2016]
- 2016: Niedeckens BAP: Lebenslänglich im Heimathafen Neukölln [Lifelong at Heimathafen Neukölln]
- 2018: Niedeckens BAP: Live und deutlich [Live and pronounced]
- 2020: Niedeckens BAP: Alles fließt [Everything flows]
- 2024: Niedeckens BAP: Zeitreise / Live im Sartory [Time travel / Live at the Sartory]

== Singles ==
- 1980: "Chauvi Rock" [Chauvinist rock] / "Wahnsinn" [Frenzy]
- 1981: "Jupp" [Joe] / "Frau, ich freu mich" [Woman, I'm glad]
- 1981: "Verdamp lang her" [Damn long time ago] / "Waschsalon" [Laundromat café]
- 1982: "Kristallnaach" [Kristallnacht] / "Wellenreiter" [Fashion surfer]
- 1982: "Do kanns zaubre" [You can charm; literally: You can do the magic]
- 1983: "Nemm mich met" [Take me with you] / "Ahn' ner Leitplank" [Alongside a guardrail]
- 1984: "Drei Wünsch frei" [Three wishes free] / "Sendeschluss" [Sign-off]
- 1984: "Alexandra, nit nur do" [Alexandra, not only you] / "Zofall un e janz klei bessje Glöck" [By accident with a little bit of luck]
- 1985: "Bunte Trümmer" [Coloured ruins] / "Lisa"
- 1986: "Endlich allein" [Alone at last] / "Almanya" [Almanya = Germany in Turkish]
- 1986: "Time Is Cash, Time Is Money" / "Vun mir uss Kitsch (live)" [Sob stuff, if you want (live)]
- 1988: "Fortsetzung folgt" [To be continued] / "Sandino"
- 1988: "Saison der Container" [Container season]
- 1988: "Dat däät joot" [This felt good] / "Op dä Deckel vum Clown" [Taking it on the clown's credit]
- 1989: "Shanghai" / "Rääts un links vum Bahndamm" [To the right and left of the railway embankment]
- 1990: "Alles em Lot" [Everything's alright] / "Domohls" [Back then]
- 1991: "Vis à Vis" [Face to face] / "Griefbar noh" [In close reach]
- 1991: "Sie määt süchtig" [She's addictive] / "Happy End"
- 1991: "Verdamp lang her (Live)" [Damn long time ago] / "Ne schöne Jrooß (Live)" [Best regards (Live)]
- 1993: "Widderlich" [Disgusting] / "Blonde Mohikaner" [Blond Mohikans]
- 1993: "Wie die Sichel vum Mohnd" [Like the moon's crescent]
- 1993: "Paar Daach fröher" [A few days earlier]
- 1995: "Ich danz met dir" [I dance with you]
- 1996: "Lass se doch reden" [Let them talk]
- 1996: "Nix wie bessher" [Nothing as it was before]
- 1996: "Weihnachtnaach (feat. Nina Hagen)" [Christmas night] (This is a German-language version of Fairytale of New York by The Pogues)
- 1998: "Lena"
- 1999: "Ahnunfürsich" [In and of itself]
- 1999: "Rita"
- 1999: "Mayday"
- 2000: "FC, jeff Jas! (Aufstiegsversion)" [FC, step on it! (Promotion version)]
- 2001: "Aff un zo" [Every now and then]
- 2001: "Shoeshine"
- 2002: "Schluss, aus, okay" [End, over, okay]
- 2003: "FC, jeff Jas! (Die dritte Version)" [FC, step on it! (the third version)]
- 2004: "Wann immer du nit wiggerweiss" [Whenever you don't know what to do]
- 2004: "Für Maria" [For Maria]
- 2005: "Frau, ich freu mich" [Woman, I'm glad]
- 2006: "Verdamp lang her (Die verdammt lange Single)" [A damn long time ago (The damn long single)]
- 2006: "Time Is Cash, Time Is Money (feat. Culcha Candela)"
- 2008: "Morje fröh doheim" [Home tomorrow morning]
- 2011: "Halv su wild" [No big deal; literally: Half as wild]
- 2012: "All die Augenblicke [feat. Clueso]" [All the moments]

== Related projects ==
- 1983: Book BAP övver BAP [BAP about BAP]
- 1987: Album Schlagzeiten [Hit times] (Wolfgang Niedecken solo-album)
- 1989: Book BAP övver China (about their Chinese tour)
- 1992: Album Arsch huh, Zäng ussenander [Get up and speak out; literally: Ass up, teeth apart] (various bands from Cologne, live concert against racism and neo-fascism)
- 1995: Album Leopardefell [Leopard's skin] (Wolfgang Niedecken solo-album with translated Dylan lyrics)
- 2002: Film Vill passiert [A lot has happened] (film by Wim Wenders about BAP)
- 2011: Book Für 'ne Moment [For a moment] (autobiography by Wolfgang Niedecken & Oliver Kobold)
- 2022: Album Dylanreise [Dylan journey] (Wolfgang Niedecken solo-album)

== See also ==
- Birlikte – Zusammenstehen (parts of the performance at the festival are published on Niedeckens BAP: Das Märchen vom gezogenen Stecker – live
- Roland "Balou" Temme
