= Tommy Engel =

German musician and actor

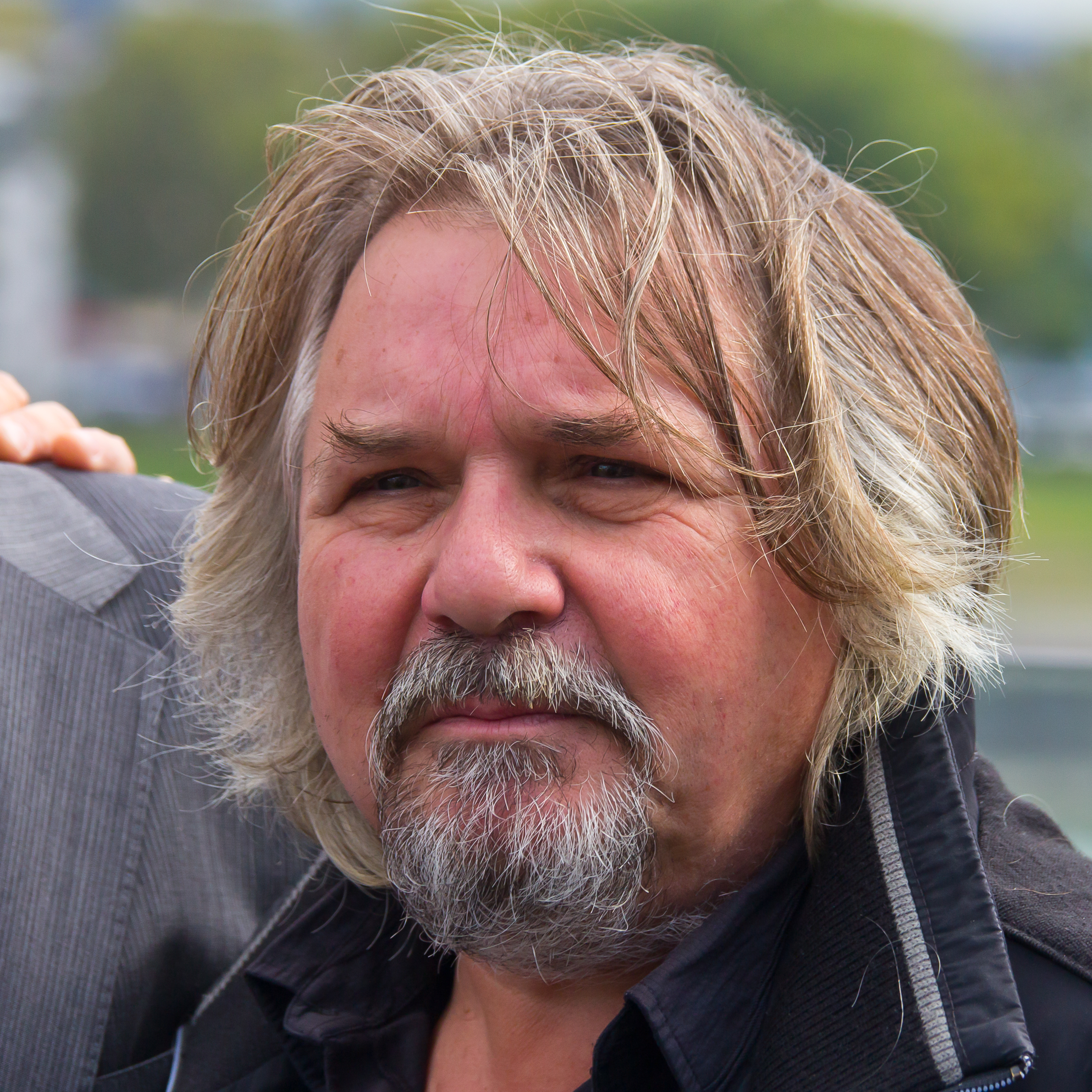
Tommy Engel (2012)

Tommy Engel (German pronunciation: [ˈtɔmi ˈʔɛŋl̩], Colognian: [ˈtɔ́mɪ ˈʔɛ̂ŋəl]; born 1949) is a German musician and actor. He was the lead singer of German band Bläck Fööss through 1994, and has released albums as a solo performer.

== Works (selection) ==
- Verdamp lang her (Colognian pronunciation: [fɐˈdamp²ˌlaŋ² ˌheːɐ̯]) (in cooperation with Klaus Heuser)
