= Wilfried Schmickler =

German comedian and cabaret artist

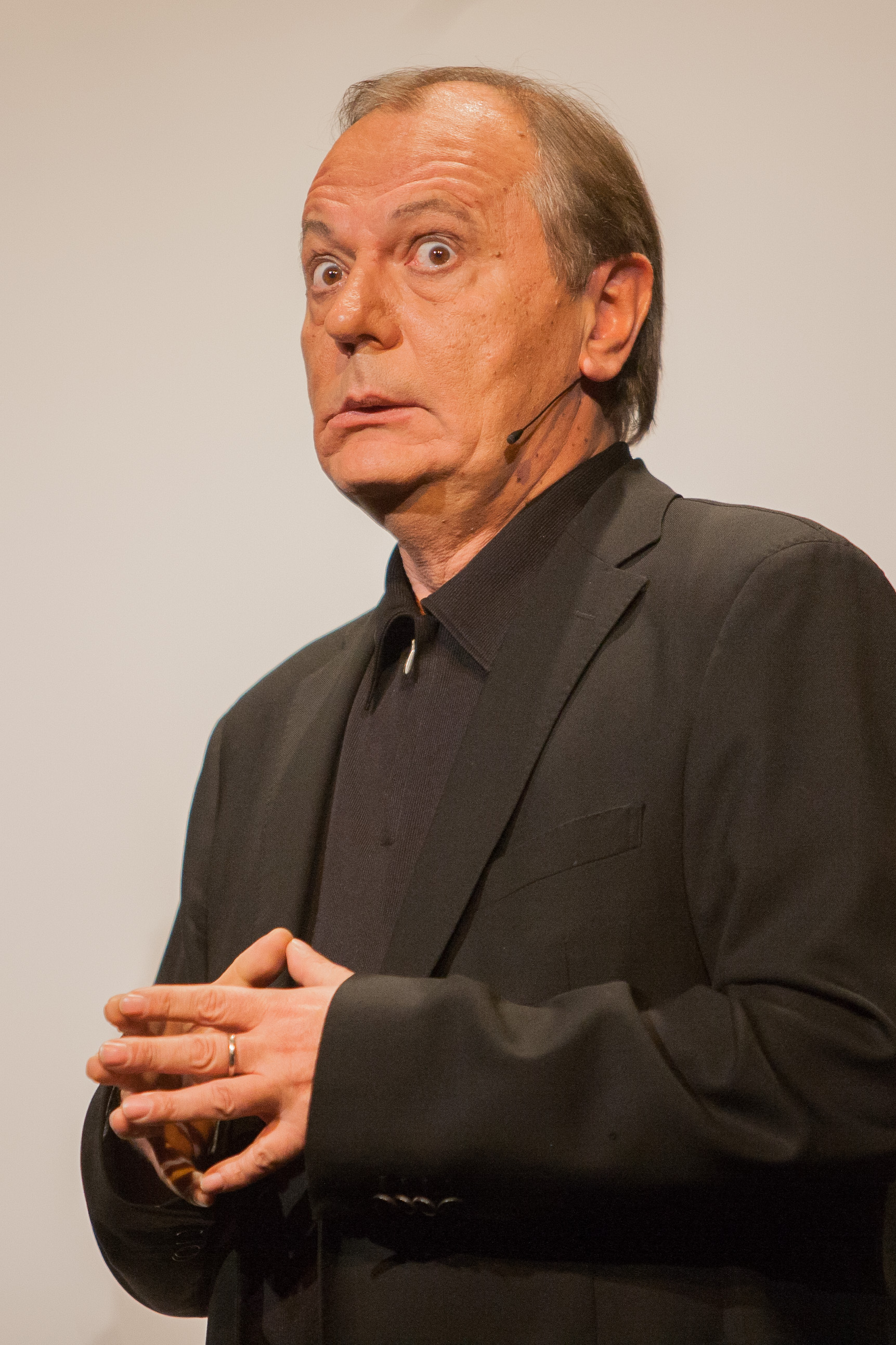
- Wilfried Schmickler in Pantheon, Bonn, 2007
- Born: 28 November 1954 (age 70); Hitdorf, Leverkusen, West Germany
- Occupation(s): German comedian and cabaret artist
- Website: http://www.wilfriedschmickler.de/

Wilfried Schmickler (born 28 November 1954 in ) is a German comedian and cabaret artist.

== Life ==
Schmickler works as a comedian in Germany on TV-shows, in radio and on theatre stages. His programme consist of political cabaret.

== Solo programmes by Schmickler ==
- Aufhören! (2004)
- Danke! (2005)
- Zum Dritten (2007)
- Es war nicht alles schlecht (2009)
- Weiter (2010)
- Ich weiss es doch auch nicht (2012)

== Awards ==
- 2001 – Deutscher Kleinkunstpreis together with 3-Gestirn
- 2007 – Prix Pantheon, special award Reif & Bekloppt
- 2007 – Deutscher Kabarettpreis
- 2009 – Deutscher Kleinkunstpreis, Sparte Kabarett
- 2010 – Salzburger Stier
