= Klaus Heuser =

German rock guitarist, composer and producer (born 1957)

Klaus "Major“ Heuser
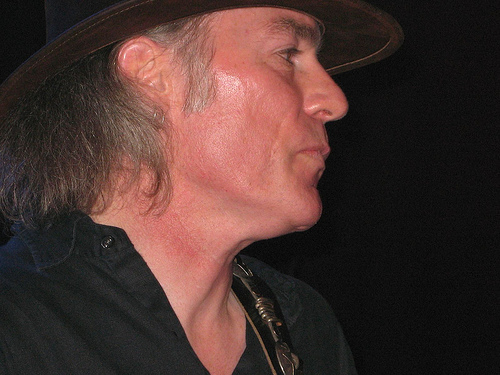
- Heuser in 2006

Background information
- Born: Klaus Heuser; 27 January 1957 (age 69); Leverkusen-Wiesdorf, Germany
- Genres: Rock, Blues rock
- Occupations: Musician; Songwriter; Producer
- Instrument: Guitar
- Years active: 1969–present
- Website: http://www.major-heuser.de/

Klaus "Major“ Heuser (born 27 January 1957 in Leverkusen-Wiesdorf) is a German musician, composer and producer. He found international fame as the lead guitarist of the Cologne rock band BAP.

His musical influences are the Rolling Stones, especially Keith Richards, Rory Gallagher, as well as Eric Clapton, the Dutch band Golden Earring and Gary Moore.

== Career ==
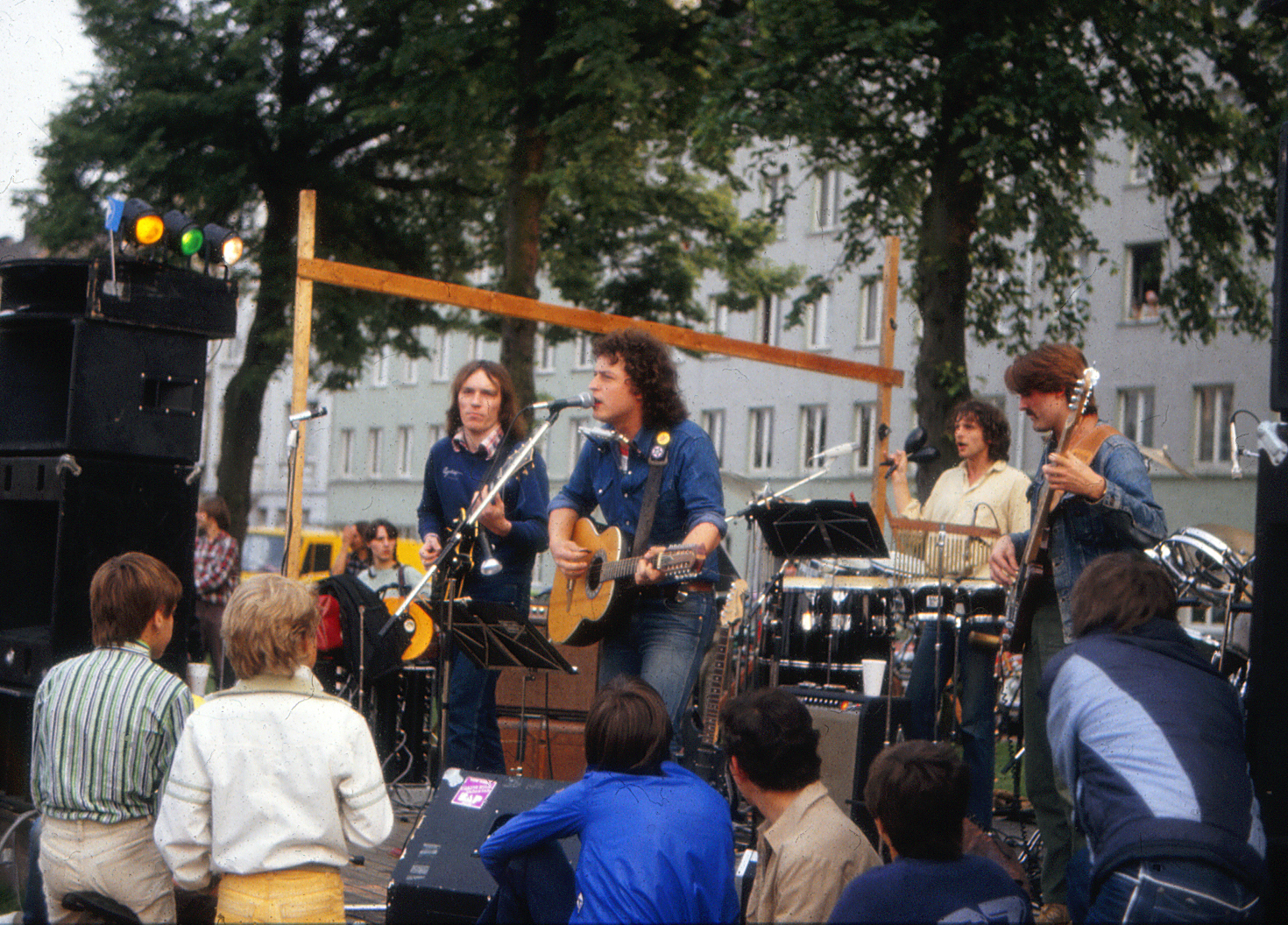
BAP in Aachen, 1980

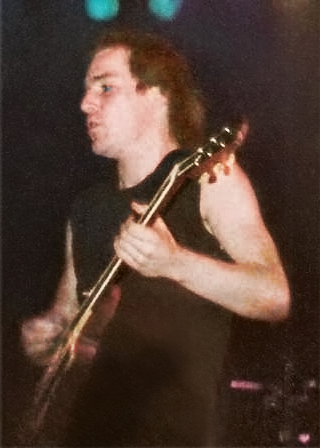
Heuser performing with BAP in Iserlohn, November 1984

Heuser gained major popularity as the guitarist of the rock band BAP, of which he was a member from 1980 to 1999. He was mainly responsible for BAP's musical style and wrote music to many hit songs including Verdamp lang her [Damn long time ago], Frau, ich freu mich [Woman, I'm glad], Ne schöne Jrooß [Best regards], Kristallnaach [Crystal night], Alles em Lot [Everything's alright] and Nix wie bessher [Nothing as before].

In parallel to his BAP efforts, Heuser in 1981 also teamed up with Wolf Maahn (from Food Band), Didi Maaz and Rich Schwab (both from Schroeder Roadshow) to form Neue Heimat (as Klaus Steine) and record a cover version of Heintje's Ich bau dir ein Schloss (1968) in the style of the Neue Deutsche Welle. However, neither Maahn nor Heuser were interested in continuing this project, so that the band later became the support band of Purple Schulz.

When BAP paused for a while in the late 1980s, Heuser spent some time in Los Angeles, USA, where he lived in Roger Taylor's (from Queen) house for some while. This is also when he learnt to produce music. Once back in Germany, among other production activities, Heuser produced the three Brings albums Zwei Zoote Minsche (1991), Kasalla (1992) and Fünf (1997), as well as Martin Schenkel's album My own way (2000).

On 17 February 2006, he released Major & Suzan, a collaborative album, which was recorded with Berlin singer Susanne Werth (from Wasteland Green).

Meeting German blues guitarist Richard Bargel during a show of "Harmonie talk" moderated by Anka Zink in the Harmonie, Bonn, on 10 December 2008 resulted in an ad hoc jam session and the birth of the band project Men in Blues. The first concert happened on the 12 Dezember 2009. Since 2010, both musicians toured regularly, later supported by Sascha Delbrouck (bass) and Marcus Rieck (drums). The critically acclaimed live album Richard Bargel LIVE mit Klaus "Major" Heuser & Band was nominated for the "Preis der deutschen Schallplattenkritik". Matthias Krauss (keyboards) and Mario Argandoña (percussion) joined the band on the first studio album Men in Blues, which was released in Germany, Austria and Switzerland on 3 February 2012. On 1 September 2012, Bargel suffered a sudden hearing loss during a concert, forcing the shared activities to come to an end.

In 2013, Heuser then formed the "Klaus Major Heuser Band", which released their first album Men in Trouble. Based around the members of the former "Men in Blues" band Krauss, Delbrouck and Rieck, the new band now includes Cologne vocalist, texter and guitarist Thomas Heinen (from Bosstime and Pirate Radio). The second studio album named 57 was released in September 2014, the corresponding tour ended in 2015, followed by a live double-album named 57 Live. In April 2016, the studio album What's up? was released, the tour ended in 2017. In August 2018, the new album And Now?! was released, the corresponding tour lasted until mid 2019.

== Notable information ==
Klaus Heuser got his nickname Major from Major Healey from the TV series I Dream of Jeannie.

Following medical advice after a skin cancer incident Heuser wears a leather hat which has become a signature feature over the decades.

Heuser lives in Cologne-Rodenkirchen and is married to Marion Heuser, a member of Cologne's city council for the Green party and former archeologist, since 1986. The couple has a son named Philipp.

Together with classical guitarist Hubert Käppel, Heuser also worked on a concert and information series on guitar music. The plans had to be cancelled in 2013 when Heuser suffered a nerve illness in the middle finger of his right hand, so he could no longer perform at the necessary level of accuracy.
