= Bläck Fööss =

German music group

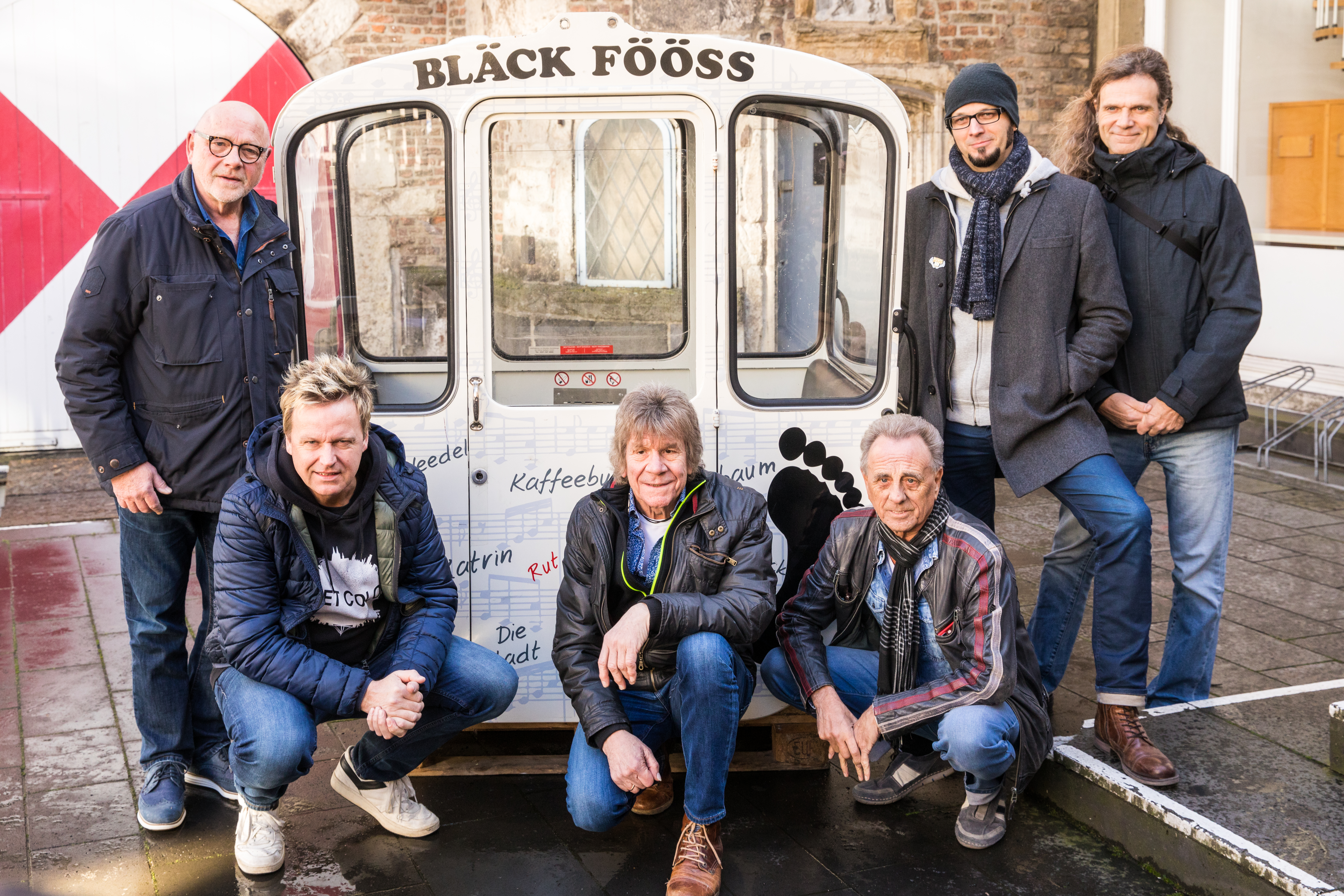
Bläck Fööss, 2020; Ralph Gusovius (on the left of the gondola cabin), Mirko Bäumer, Günther "Bömmel" Lückerath, Erry Stoklosa (in front of the gondola cabin), Pit Hupperten, Hanz Thodam (on the right of the gondola cabin)

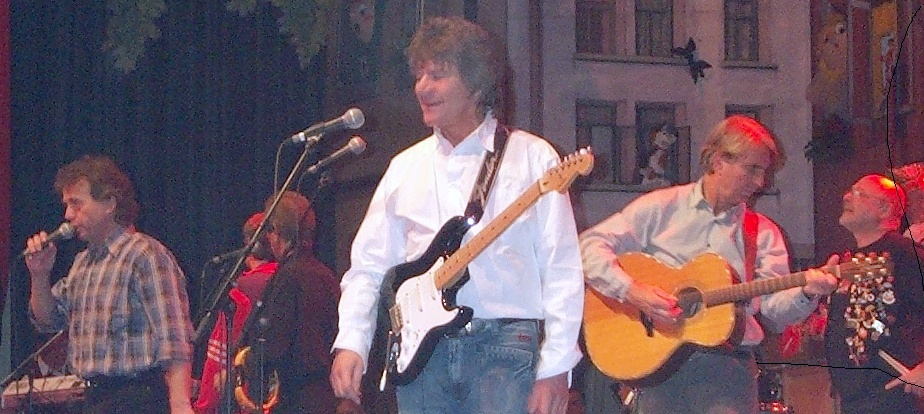
The Bläck Fööss at the Gürzenich of Cologne

The Bläck Fööss (Kölsch: De Bläck Fööss [də ˈblɛ̂k ˌfø̂ːs]) are a music group from Cologne, Germany, started in 1970. From 1973 to 2003 Werner Dies was producer of the music group.

== Name of the band ==
The band's name in Kölsch, a local dialect of Ripuarian, in which the group predominantly sings, means 'barefoot'. In their early days the group would perform barefoot, which was later given up mainly after several injuries from remains of broken glass on stages.

== Repertoire ==
The band's style of music is a cross between Schlager and pop, but they also perform songs with jazz, blues, rock and reggae styles. The group is famous for its a cappella singing. Many of the band's songs are popular carnival songs, while others are covers of bands such as Ladysmith Black Mambazo, (Bütz mich, cover of Hey baby, 1990) Cologne music group De Vier Botze (En d'r Kaygaß Nummere Null!, 1975) Beatles (When I'm Sixty-Four, Penny Lane, 1989), Hollies or Willi Ostermann.

In August 1985 the band got their biggest chart success, with the song "Frankreich, Frankreich" (English: France, France) landing in at number 9 in the German charts, after the band had entered the German charts for the first time with the song "Katrin" in January 1985.

== Band members ==
In their first 4 decades together, the Bläck Fööss only had a few changes in membership. Dieter „Joko“ Jaenisch (1970-1974, 1977–1980; died in 1998), Rolf Lammers (1974-1977) and Willy Schnitzler (1980-2005) played keyboard. In 1994, the band had its biggest split, with frontman Tommy Engel leaving for a solo career after creative differences.

- Karl Friedrich "Kafi" Biermann (born 1946): guitar, percussion, vocals (from 1995 to 2017)
- Ralph Gusovius (born March 16, 1950): drums, accordion, vocals (from 1995 to February 2023)
- Günther "Bömmel" Lückerath (born June 20, 1948): guitar, banjo, mandolin, fiddle, vocals (founding member, active until January 2023)
- Hartmut Priess (born 19 August 1942 in Berlin):bass, guitar, mandolin (founding member, active until 2018)
- Peter Schütten (born 4 August 1943 in Koeln/Cologne): guitar, singing, percussion (founding member, active until March 2017)
- Erry Stoklosa (born 25 October 1947 in the former city Porz): guitar, percussion, vocals (founding member, active until January 2023)
- Andreas Wegener (born 18 July 1956 in the former City Opladen): piano, synthesizer, accordion, vocals (since 2005)
- Mirko Bäumer (born 30 September 1968 in Hennef): guitar, vocals (since 2017)
- Pit Hupperten (born 1974): guitar, vocals (since 2017)
- Hanz Thodam (born in Nippes, city part of Cologne): bass guitar, vocals (since 2019)
- Christoph „Raudi“ Granderath: singer, guitar, mandoline (since 2021, 2019 and 2020 back-up musician)
- Alex Vesper (born 27 June 1967 in Cologne): drums (since 2023)

Willy Schnitzler left the band in 2005 after arthritis of the hand rendered him unable to play. He died because of a car accident in 2019. He was succeeded by Andreas Wegener. In January 2017 Singer Kafi Biermann and founding member Peter Schütten left the band and were succeeded by Mirko Bäumer and Pit Hupperten. Hanz Thodam replaced bass player Hartmut Priess after the band's traditional New Year's Eve concert of 2018.

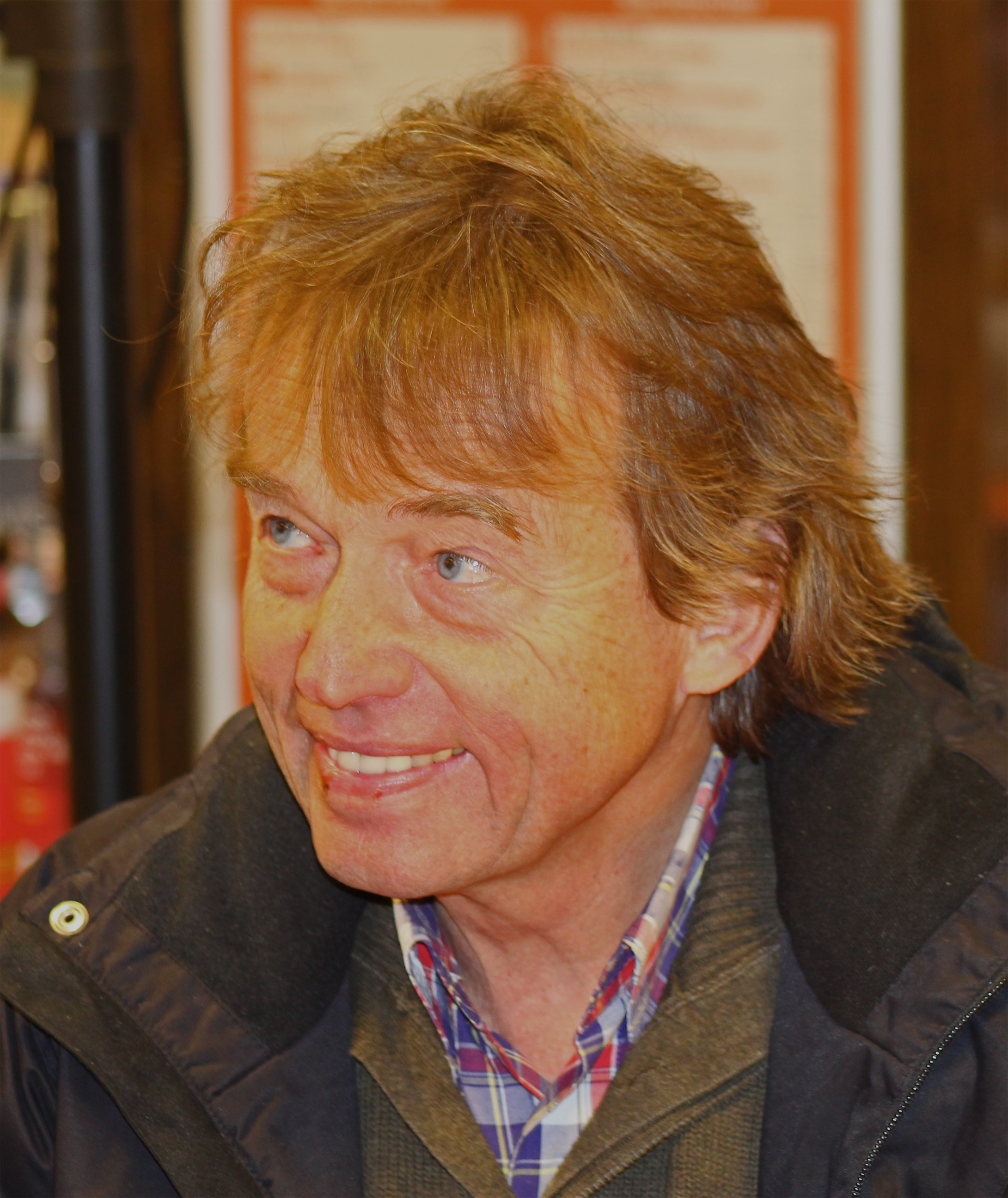
Kafi Biermann

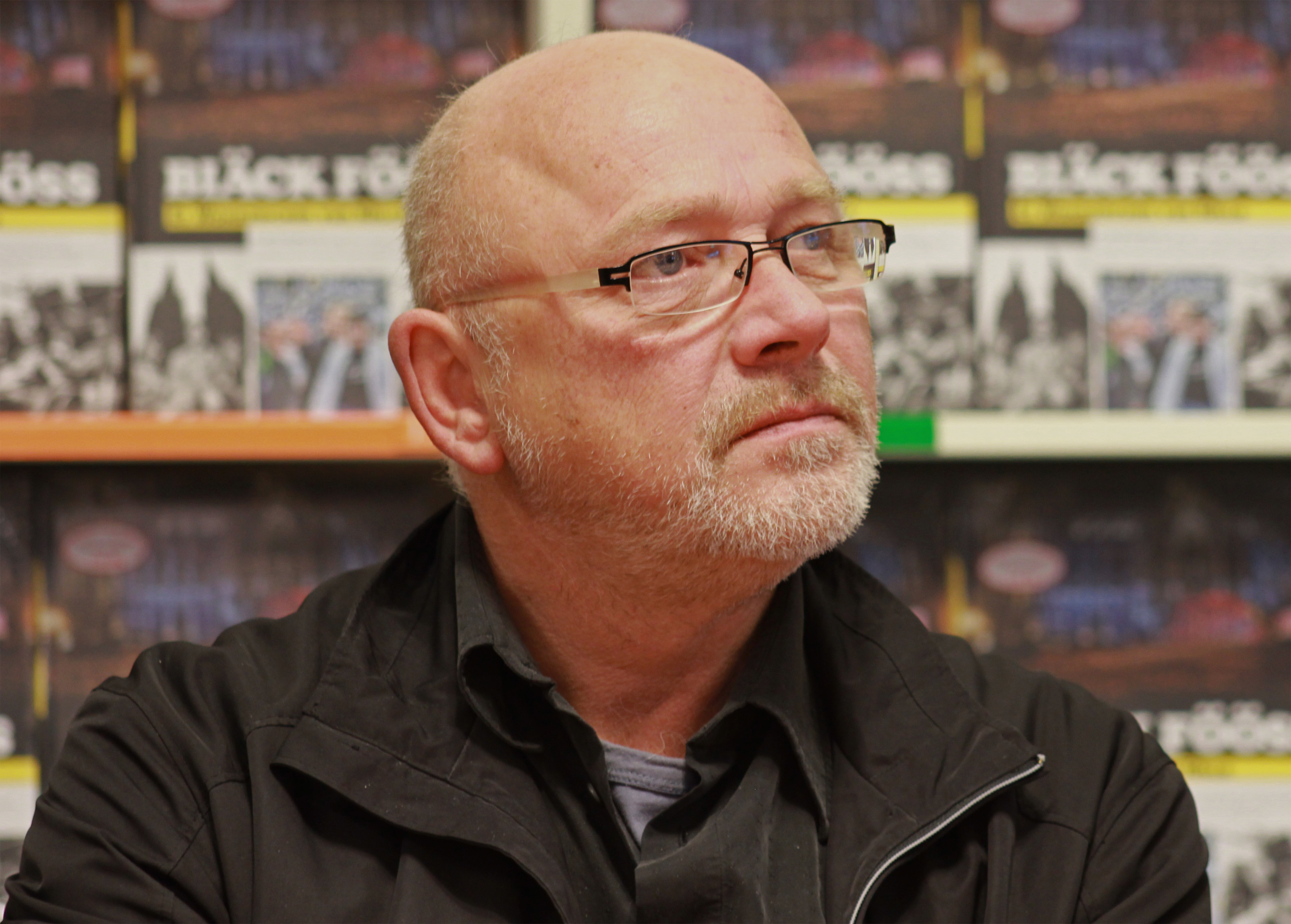
Ralph Gusovius

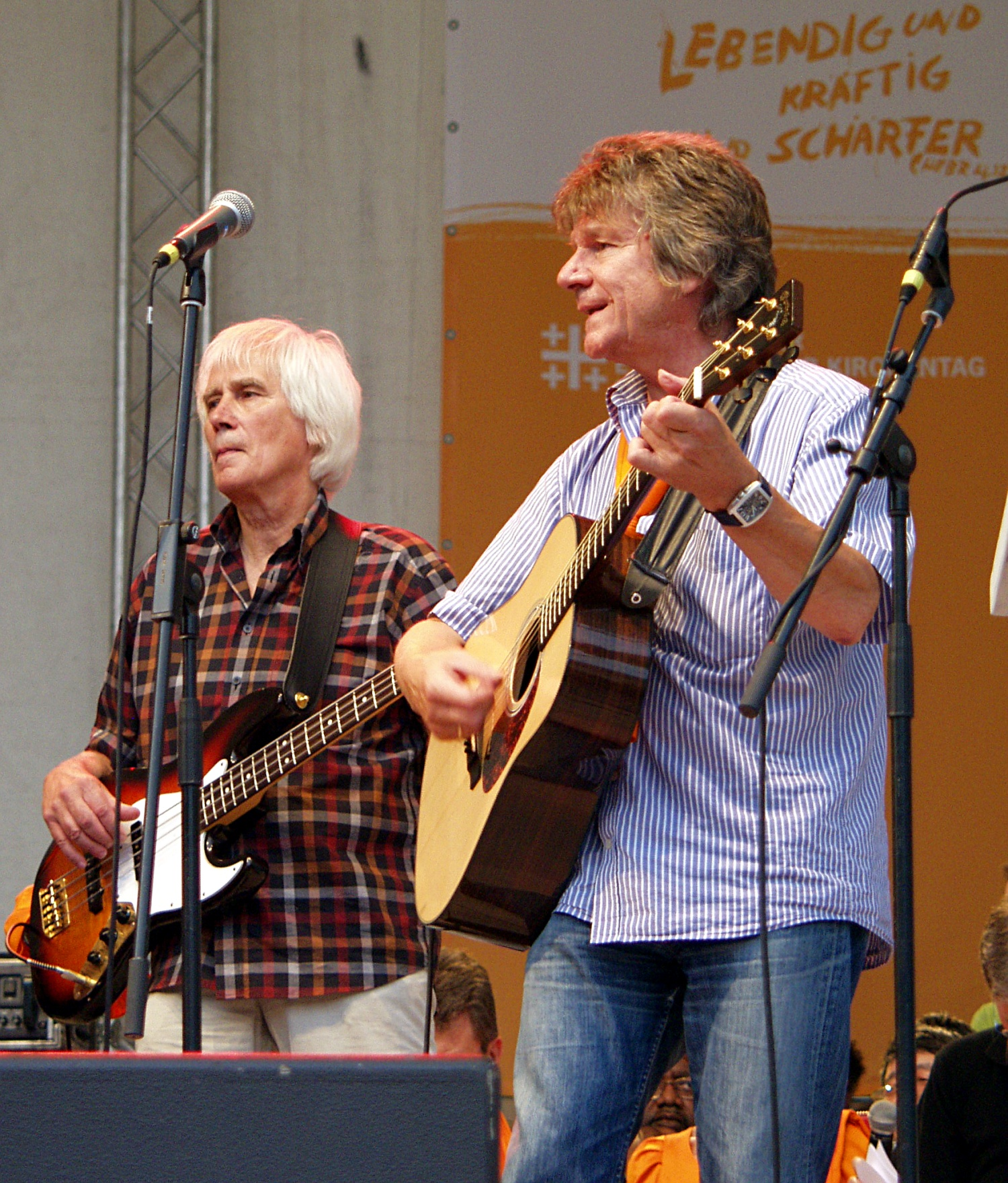
Hartmut Priess and Günther Lückerath

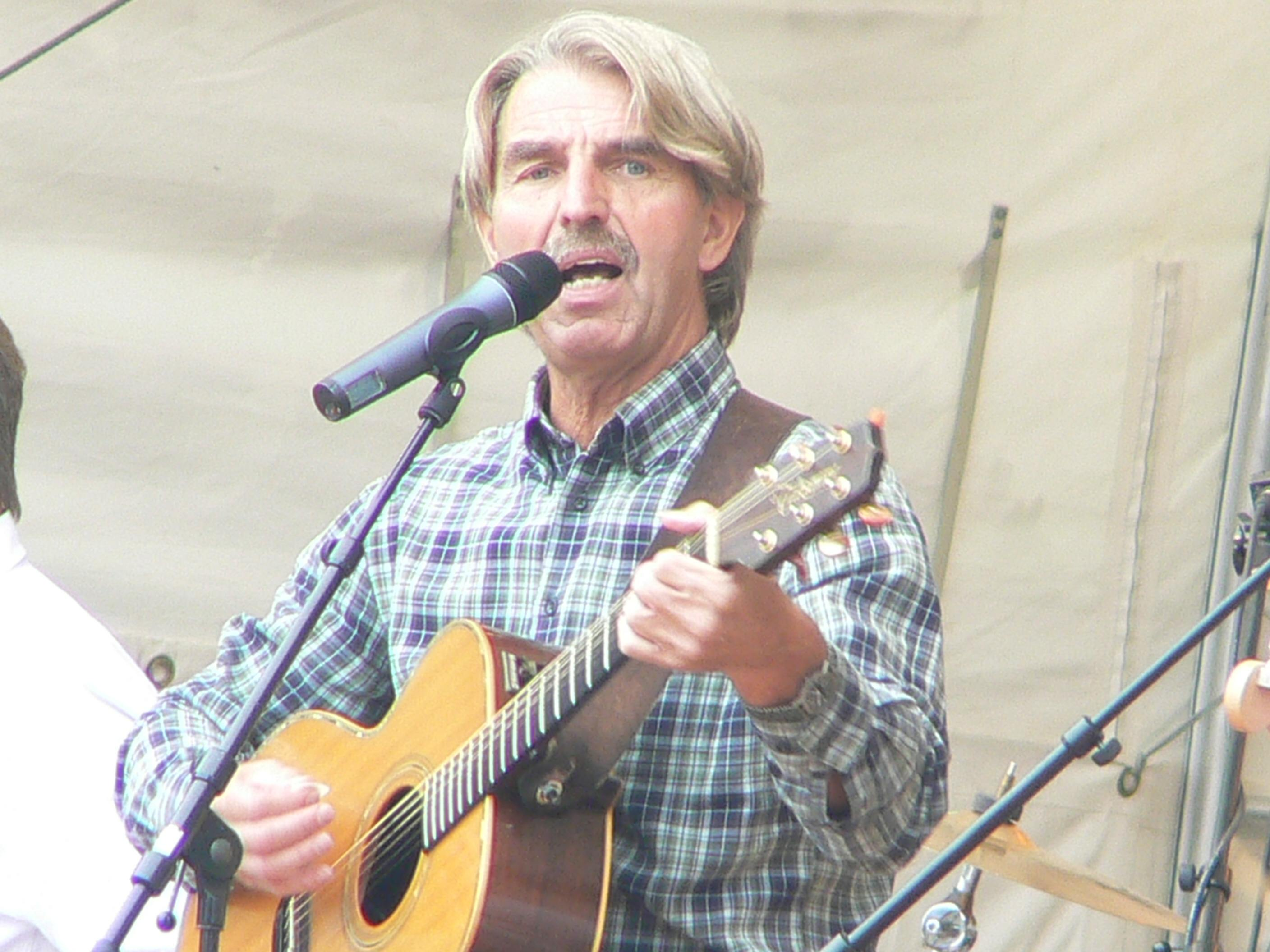
Peter Schütten

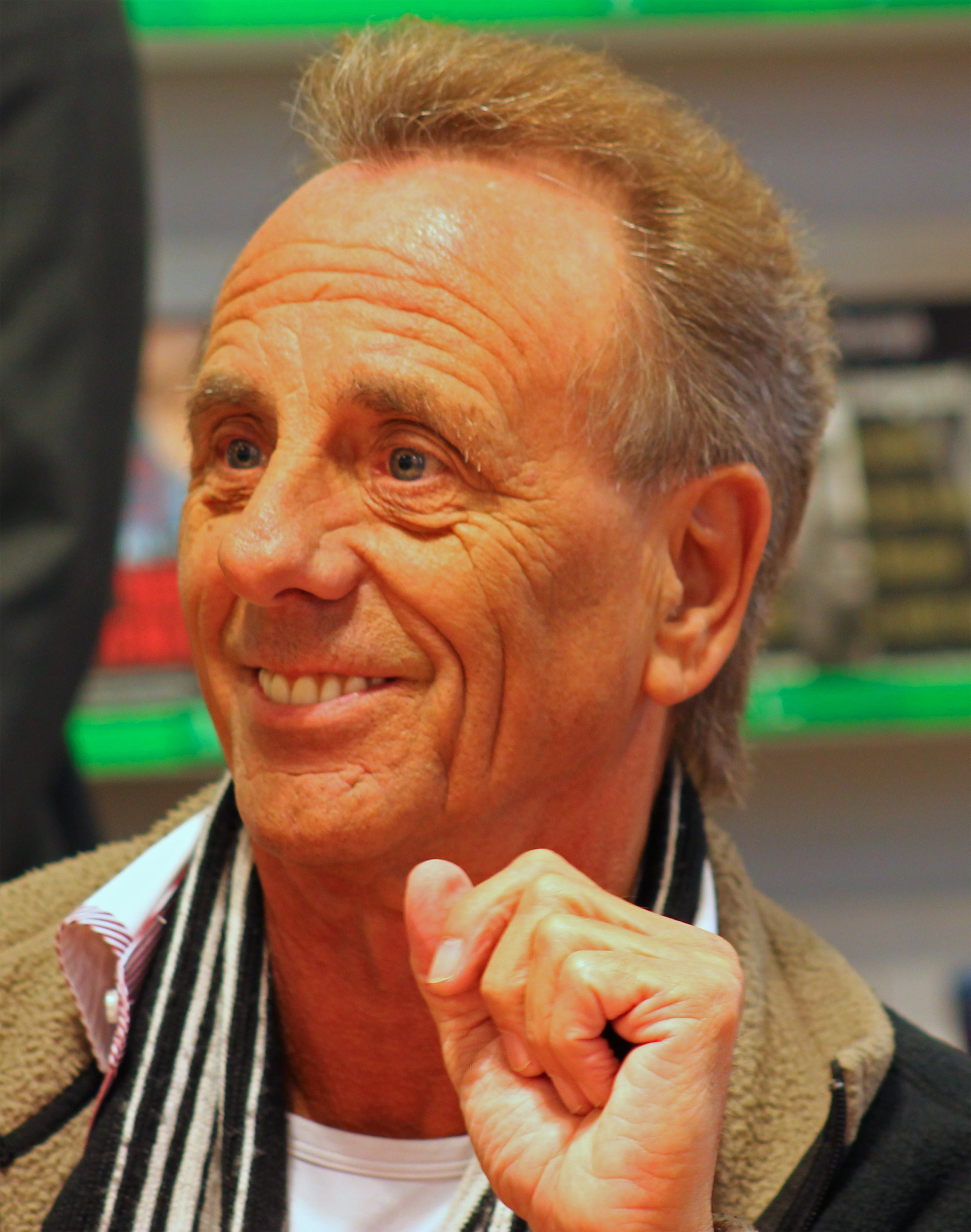
Erry Stoklosa

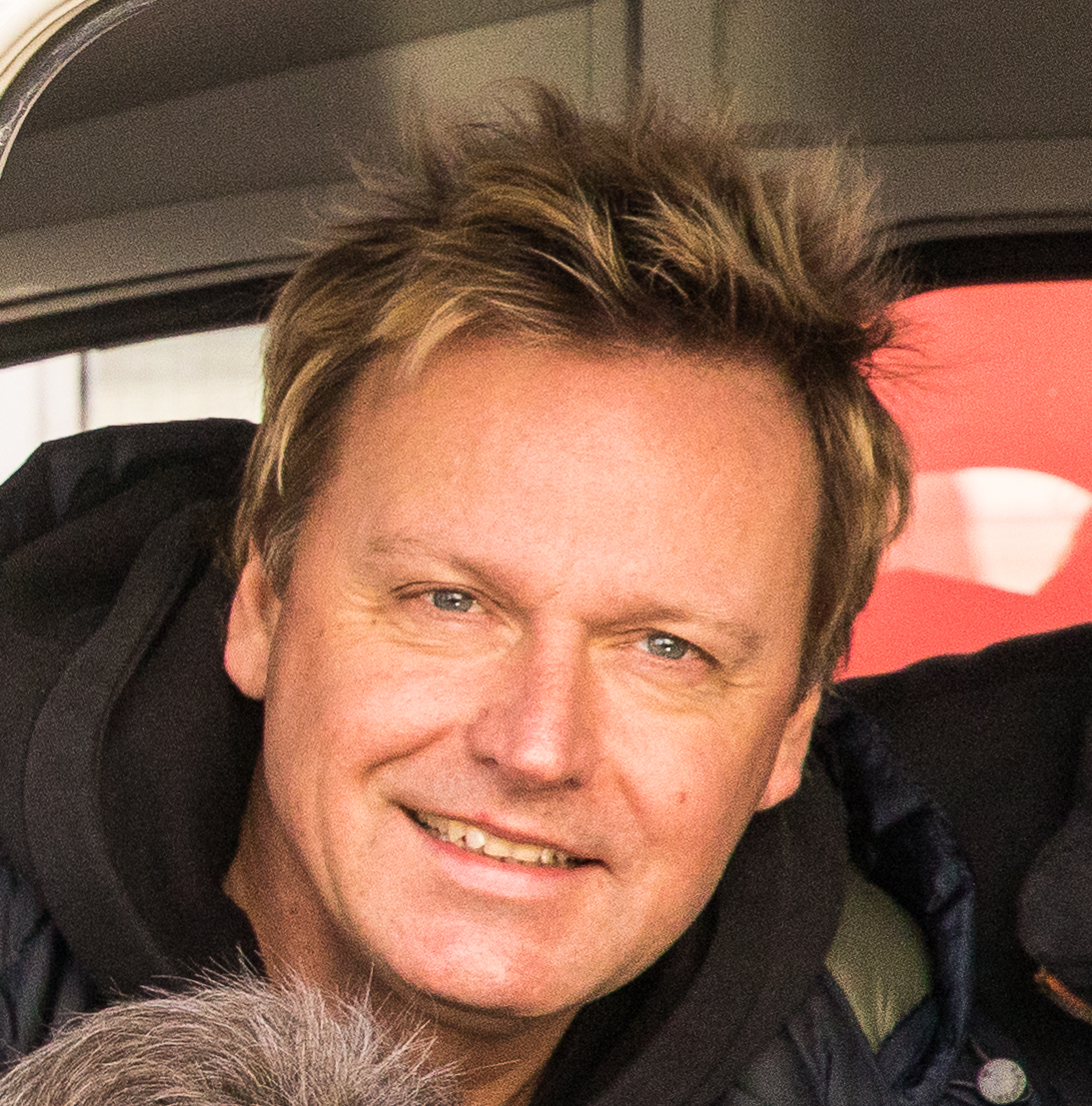
Mirko Bäumer

=== Discography ===
Single A-Side	Single B-Side	Year	Charts	Album	Year	Charts
Rievkooche Walzer	Selverhuhzick	1970	-	-	-	-
Drink doch eine met	Mir drinken us einer Fläsch	1974	-	Op bläcke Fööss noh Kölle	1974	-
Mer losse d'r Dom en Kölle	In unserem Veedel	1974	-	Op bläcke Fööss noh Kölle	1974	-
Leev Linda Lou	Whisky Double für Old Wabbel	1974	-	Op bläcke Fööss noh Kölle	1974	-
Loss d'r Kopp nit hänge	De Mama kritt schon widder e Kind	1975	-	-	-	-
Lück wie ich un du	Die 3 vun d'r Linie 2	1975	-	Lück wie ich un du	1975	-
Pänz, Pänz, Pänz	Einmol em Johr	1975	-	Lück wie ich un du	1975	-
Damenwahl em Stammlokal	Et Spanien-Leed	1976	-	Bei uns doheim	1976	-
Ming eetste Fründin	Ich krij'e Bier un du kriß e Bier	1976	-	Bei uns doheim	1976	-
Sirtaki	Rita Schnell	1977	-	Links eröm – Rächs eröm	1977	7
Loss mer jet schunkele	Lange Samstag en d'r City	1977	-	Links eröm – Rächs eröm	1977	7
Danz Mädche Danz	Et jitt kei jrößer Leid	1978	-	Mir han 'nen Deckel	1978	3
Kaffeebud	Himmelfahrt	1978	-	Mir han 'nen Deckel	1978	3
Weia Oweia	Ich han nen Deckel	1978	-	Mir han 'nen Deckel	1978	3
Familijedaach	Treck noch ens dat Kleid ahn	1979	-	Uns Johreszigge	1979	10
Indianer kriesche nit	Anglerleed	1980	-	D'r Rhing erop – d'r Rhing eraf	1980	12
Flipper	M.S.Monika	1980	-	D'r Rhing erop – d'r Rhing eraf	1980	12
-	-	-	-	De Bläck Fööss Live	1980	4
Schäle Schäng	Kölsche Bröck	1981	-	Wenn et jöck...	1981	15
Schötzefess	Heimweh en Kölle	1982	-	Morje, Morje	1982	35
Achterbahn	Polterowend	1983	-	Immer wigger	1983	25
Huusmeister Kaczmarek	Sporthall	1984	-	Mir klääve am Lääve	1984	12
Katrin	Surfen am Fühlinger See	1985	25	Mir klääve am Lääve	1984	12
-	-	-	-	Em richtije Veedel	1985	-
Frankreich Frankreich	Le Mont St. Michel	1985	9	Schöne Bescherung	1985	16
Bye, Bye My Love	S.D.I. (Mir hevven af)	1985	27	Schöne Bescherung	1985	16
Party Service	Drachenfels	1986	67	Zweierlei Fööss	1986	65
Nena	Herman The German	1986	-	Zweierlei Fööss	1986	65
Du bes zu schön	Kölle am Rhing	1987	-	Zweierlei Fööss	1986	65
-	-	-	-	Pänz Pänz Pänz (live)	1987	-
Baby I Love You	Loss m'r jon	1987	-	...endlich frei!	1987	-
Wochenplan	Wochemaat en Kölle, Wochenplan (DKF Version)	1987	-	...endlich frei!	1987	-
-	-	-	-	Was habst du in die Sack?	1988	-
Stellt üch vüür	Männer	1989	23	1989 em Millowitsch-Theater	1989	7
Dovun dräum ich sulang (Tanzbrunnen)	Dä Wing vun Kölle am Rhing	1990	-	1989 em Millowitsch-Theater	1989	7
Bläck Fööss Band	Dat Wasser vun Kölle	1990	-	Et es 20 Johr jenau jetz her	1990	27
Danz Bläck Fööss Danz	Maiwiese (Instrumental)	1990	-	-	-	-
Moni hat geweint	Moni hat geweint (Live)	1991	93	Nix es ömesöns	1991	-
Tarzan	Rentner	1992	-	Nix es ömesöns	1991	-
Sie liebt dich / Komm gib mir deine Hand	Liebe deine Feinde	1993	-	A Capella	1993	31
Rheinhotel	-	1994	-	Rheinhotel	1994	71
Kumm widder heim	-	1994	-	Rheinhotel	1994	71
Wenn et Leech usjing em Roxy	-	1996	-	Roxy	1996	-
Do han sen en d'r Ärm jenomme	-	1996	-	Roxy	1996	-
-	-	-	-	Premium Gold Collection	1997	-
Fastelovendstrumm	-	1998	-	Schönes Wochenende	1998	89
-	-	-	-	30 Jahre Bläck Fööss	2000	27
Zick Zick eröm	-	2000	-	-	-	-
-	-	-	-	Loss mer uns verdrare	2000	-
-	-	-	-	Best of...zum Fiere	2002	54
-	-	-	-	K-BF 33	2003	27
-	-	-	-	Best of...zum dräume	2003	-
-	-	-	-	Kölsche Weihnacht	2003	-
-	-	-	-	Rut un Wiess	2004	-
-	-	-	-	Usjebomb	2005	-
-	-	-	-	Do laach et Hätz, do jrins die Fott	2006	99
-	-	-	-	Best of ... zum danze	2007	-
Ävver bitte bitte met jeföhl	-	2007	84	Jommer noh Hus ... oder solle mer blieve?	2008	-
-	-	-	-	Wie die Zick verjeiht...	2009	-
He deit et wih un do deit et wih	-	2010	34	Alles für die Liebe	2011	-
Mir han e hätz für Kölle	-	2011	81	Alles für die Liebe	2011	-
Kölner Leechter	-	2013	-	-	-	-

== Literature ==
- Matthias Becker: Bläck Fööss - schwatz op wiess: 124 Lieder in Wort und Bild; Texte, Hintergründe, Kommentare, Kölsch-Lexikon, Chronik, Diskografie. Gerig-Musikverlage, De Bläck-Fööss-Musikverlag, Bergisch Gladbach Bensberg, 2000, 152 Seiten, kartoniert, ISBN 3-87252-312-0

== See also ==
- King Size Dick
