= Mountaineering in India =

- Country: India
- Governing body: Indian Mountaineering Foundation
- National team: -

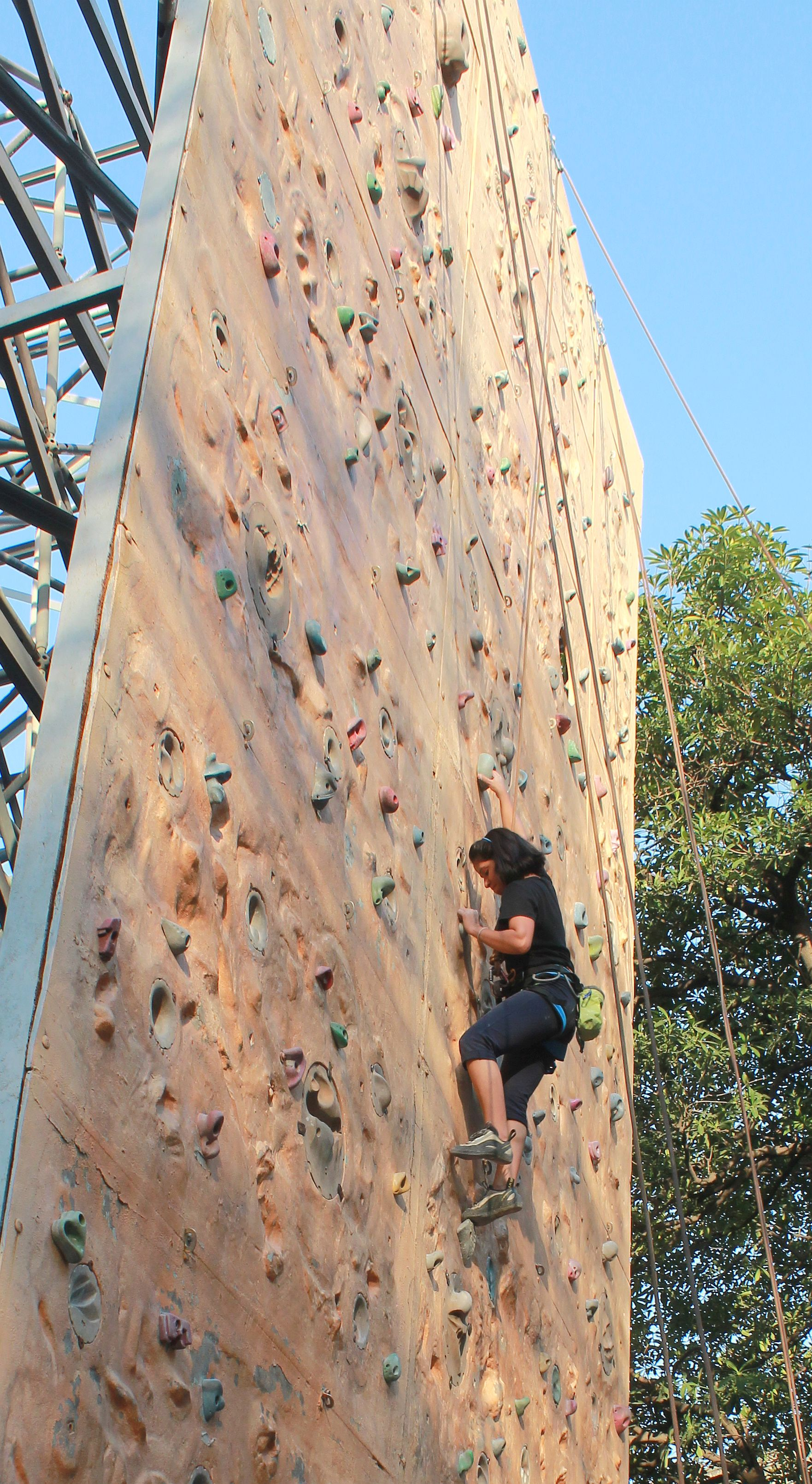
Rock climbing practice on artificial rock wall at the Indian Mountaineering Foundation, Delhi

Mountaineering is quite popular in India, since the entire northern and north-eastern borders are the Himalayas, the highest mountain range in the world. The apex body in India is the Indian Mountaineering Foundation, which is affiliated to the UIAA.

India has several premier mountaineering institutes. The four National Institutes are:

- Himalayan Mountaineering Institute, Darjeeling
- Nehru Institute of Mountaineering, Uttarkashi
- Jawahar Institute of Mountaineering and Winter Sports, Pahalgam
- National Institute of Mountaineering and Adventure Sports (NIMAS), Dirang, Arunachal Pradesh
- Sonam Gyatso Mountaineering Institute, Gangtok

The other institutes are:

- Atal Bihari Vajpayee Institute of Mountaineering and Allied Sports (ABVIMAS), Manali
- Indian Institute of Skiing and Mountaineering, Gulmarg
- Swami Vivekanand Institute of Mountaineering, Mount Abu
- Guardian Giripremi Institute of Mountaineering (GGIM), Pune, Maharashtra
- Giripremi, Pune

== Indian mountaineers ==
- Umesh Zirpe
- Ashish Mane
- Krushnaa Patil
- Asim Mukhopadhyay
- Mohan Singh Kohli
- Narendra Dhar Jayal
- Mandip Singh Soin
- Gurdial Singh
- Dawa Thondup
- Narendra Kumar
- Sudipta Sengupta
- Bachendri Pal
- Kuntal Joisher
- Nirupama Pandey
- Jaahnavi Sriperambuduru
- Malavath Purna
- Chandra Prakash Vohra
- Sonam Gyatso
- Mohan Singh Gunjyal
- Santosh Yadav
- Colonel Ajay Kothiyal
- Colonel Saurabh Singh Shekhawat
- Lt. Colonel Ranveer Jamwal
- Malli Mastan Babu
- Bhushan Harshe
- Gurjot S. Kaler

== Role of The Doon School ==
The faculty and students of The Doon School, a boys-only boarding school in Dehradun founded in 1935, are credited to be among the earliest pioneers of mountaineering in a newly independent India. The founding headmaster and teachers, including A.E. Foot, R.L. Holdsworth, J.A.K. Martyn and Jack Gibson, were all Alpinists. Along with Gurdial Singh, who joined as faculty, and Narendra Dhar Jayal, then a student at Doon, they were among the first to go on major Himalayan expeditions 1940s onwards. Jayal later went on to pioneer Indian mountaineering and, at Jawaharlal Nehru's behest, became the founder principal of the Himalayan Mountaineering Institute.

== See also ==
- Indian summiters of Mount Everest - Year wise
- Himalayan
