= Sardana (name) =

Sardana, the surname also being spelled Sardhana, Sadana or Sadanah, is a given name and surname. It may refer to the following people:

== Given name ==
- Sardana Oyunskaya (1934–2007), Yakut folklorist, literary critic, and philologist
- Sardana Avksentyeva (born 1970), Russian politician of Yakut ethnicity, mayor of Yakutsk (2018–21)
- Sardana Trofimova (born 1988), Russian long-distance runner

== Surname ==
- Archana Sardana (born 1974), Indian BASE jumper
- Brij Sadanah (1933–1990), Indian director
- Jyothika Sadanah (born 1978), Indian actress and producer
- Kamal Sadanah (born 1970), Indian actor, producer and director
- Rohit Sardana (1979–2021), Indian journalist, editor, columnist, anchor and media personality
- Rose Sardana (born 1995), Indian actress and anchor
- Roshini Sadanah (born 1977), Indian actress
- Sharat Sardana (1968–2009), British comedy writer, voice artist and producer
- Shivam Sadana (born 1990), Indian rapper, singer and songwriter
- Sukhmani Sadana (born 1983), Indian actress and anchor
