= Harshvardhan Joshi =

Indian mountaineer

Harshvardhan Yogesh Joshi
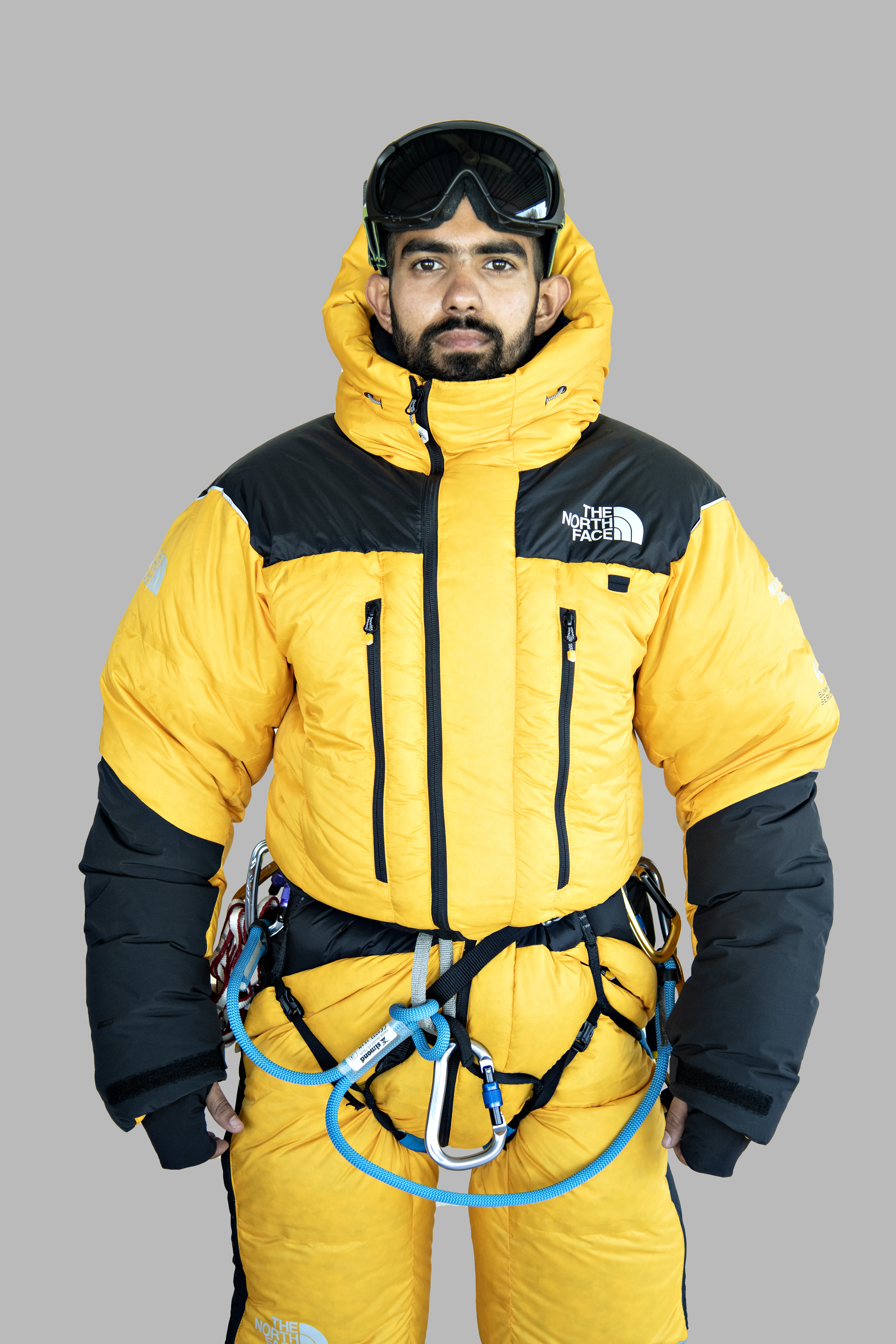
- Born: 13 November 1995 (age 30); Vasai, Maharashtra, India
- Education: Mumbai University; Michigan Ross
- Occupations: Mountaineer, motivational speaker, adventure tourism entrepreneur
- Website: harshvardhanjoshi.co

Harshvardhan Joshi (known as Harsh Joshi) is an adventure sports athlete and sustainability advocate from Vasai, Maharashtra. Joshi is an MBA from the Ross School of Business at the University of Michigan and founder of Elev8 Expeditions.

== Biography ==
Joshi was born in Vasai, and was schooled in his native village. He graduated with a Bachelor of Engineering degree in IT from Mumbai University. He completed mountaineering and outdoor courses at the Nehru Institute of Mountaineering, Himalayan Mountaineering Institute, and NOLS. He has climbed six mountains of 6000 meters and above in his mountaineering career which started in 2016. During the COVID-19 pandemic in 2020, he organized and finished an Ironman 70.3 distance triathlon on World Mental Health Day to raise awareness about mental health issues.

== Mountaineering expeditions ==
Joshi climbed Stok Kangri (20,187 ft) in 2016. In October 2019, Joshi embarked on an expedition to Himlung Himal (23,379 ft), in the Nar-Phu region of Nepal.

On 23 May 2021, Joshi reached the summit of Mount Everest in a carbon neutral effort by installing solar panels to offset his climb. During his climb, he contracted COVID-19 and encountered two cyclones on his way to the summit.

== Honors and recognition ==
- Fit India Champion, Ministry of Youth Affairs and Sports
- International Advertising Association (IAA) Olive Crown Awards - Young Green Crusader of the Year 2022
- Dow Sustainability Fellow at the University of Michigan
- Community Impact Scholar at the Ross School of Business
- TEDx talks - Scaling your Symbolic Summit and The Power of Grit

== See also ==
- Indian summiters of Mount Everest - Year wise
- List of Mount Everest records of India
