= Mount Frey =

Mountain peak

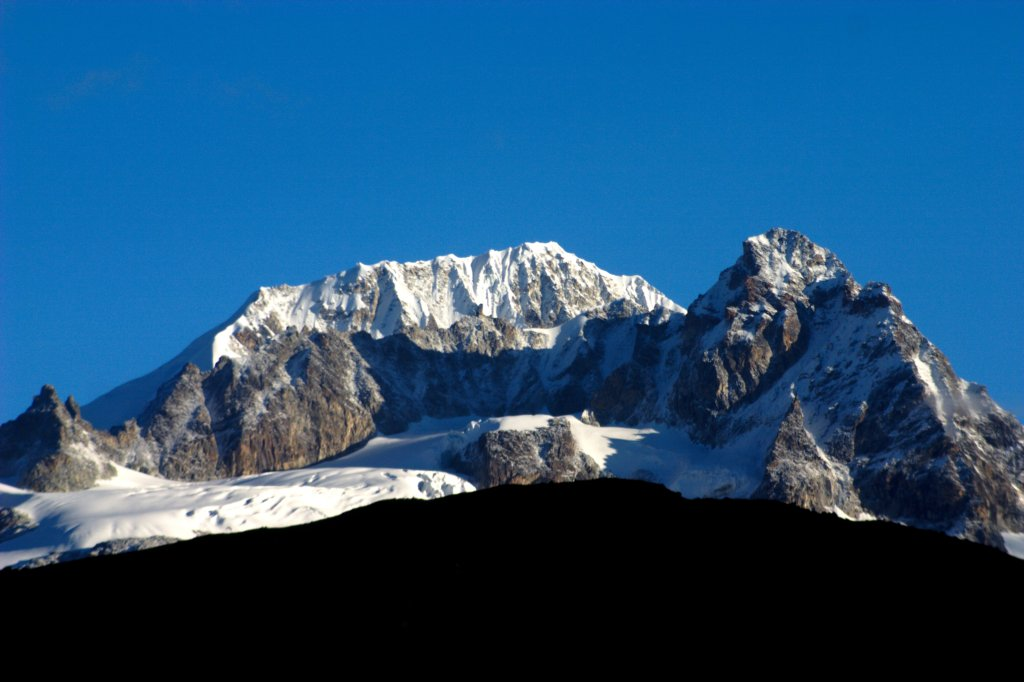
- Mount Frey (right) and Kokthang (centre) from south-east

Highest point
- Elevation: 5,889 m (19,321 ft)
- Coordinates: 27°33′08.75″N 88°05′46.34″E

Geography
- Location within Sikkim Location within Koshi Province Location within India Location within Nepal
- Location: Sikkim, India

Mount Frey (also known as Frey Peak) is a mountain peak location at 5,889 m (19,321 ft) in northwest of Sikkim, India.

== Location ==
This summit of the Frey Peak is located in the neighbourhood of Rathong Glacier, Kabru, and Kokthang. On its north, the Rathong Glacier is located.

This mountain is named after the Swiss mountaineer George Frey, who perished climbing this peak with Tenzing Norgay in 1951. Norgay advised Frey to put on his crampons, but Frey disregarded this advice and continued climbing without them. As a tribute to Frey, his ice axe and crampons are still left where they fell at the base of Frey Peak.

== Climbing history ==
In 1990, the peak was opened for the purpose of climbing.
