= Shiv Chhatrapati Award =

Highest prestigious sports award honoured annually to the players of Maharashtra

- Maharashtra state award for outstanding individual achievements in Sports
- Sponsored by: Govt. of Maharashtra
- Reward: ₹ 300,000
- First award: 1970
- Final award: 2019

Shiv Chhatrapati Award (also known as Shiv Chhatrapati State Sports Award) is the highest prestigious sports award honoured annually to the players of Maharashtra by the Government of Maharashtra in India .

The Government of Maharashtra instituted in 1969–70 a scheme for giving the Shiv Chhatrapati State Awards to sportsmen and women. The State Government has approved 24 games for men and 12 for women for this purpose.

A cash prize of Rs. 3 lakh, a memento with a headgear of Shiv Chhatrapati, along with lifetime right to travel by MSRTC bus free of cost are the benefits of the award. The winners are selected by a committee appointed by the Government of Maharashtra.

== Award categories ==
- Lifetime achievement award
- Best organiser
- Jijamata award for best coach
- Best player award
- Adventure sports award

== List of recipients ==
=== Football ===
Year	Recipient Name	Refs
2018	Atharva Gupta	

=== Taekwondo ===
Year	Recipient Name	Refs
2001-02	Yogesh H. Kapri	

=== Hockey ===
Recipient Name	Refs
Leo Pinto	
Randhir Singh Gentle
Gurbux Singh Grewal
Maharaj Krishan Kaushik
Merwyn Fernandes
Joaquim Carvalho
Marcellus Gomes
Dhanraj Pillay
Viren Rasquinha
Vikram Pillay
Adrian D'Souza

=== Chess ===
Year	Recipient Name	Refs
2002-03	Chandrashekhar Gokhale	
2014-18	Akshayraj Kore	
2014-18	Vidit Gujrathi	
2014-18	Rucha Pujari	
2014-18	Nubairshah Shaikh	
2014-18	Sagar Shah	
2014-18	Abhishek Kelkar	
2014-18	Abhimanyu Puranik	
2014-18	Shashikant Kutwal	
2014-18	Aakanksha Hagawane	
2014-18	Sameer Kathmale	
2019	Swapnil Dhopade	
2019	Divya Deshmukh	
2019	Harshit Raja	
2019	Rakesh Kulkarni	
2019	Raunak Sadhwani	

=== Judo ===
Year	Recipient Name	Refs
2010-11	Kiran bundele	

=== Mountaineering ===
Year	Recipient Name	Refs
2012-13	Pallavi Vartak	
2013-14	Umesh Zirpe	
2014-15	Ashish Mane	

=== Wrestling ===
Year	Recipient Name	Refs
2012-13	Prathamesh Sobnar	
2013-14	Sandeep Tulsi Yadav	

=== Weightlifting ===
Year	Recipient Name	Refs
2012-13	Chandrakant Mali	

=== Cricket ===
Year	Recipient Name	Refs
2000-01	Hrishikesh Kanitkar	
2015-16	Rohit Sharma	
2016-17	Ajinkya Rahane	
2017-18	Smriti Mandhana	

=== Cycling ===
Year	Recipient Name	Refs
2007-08	Vrushali Gaikwad	

=== Badminton ===
Year	Recipient Name	Refs
2018-19	Vighnesh Devlekar	

=== Rope Mallakhamb ===
Year	Recipient Name	Refs		
2008-09	Ruta Deshmukh	Uday Deshpande	Aditi Deshpande	Himani Parab

=== WUSHU ===
Year	Recipient Name	Refs
2020-21	Mitali Wani	
