= Amgoth Tukaram =

Indian mountaineer

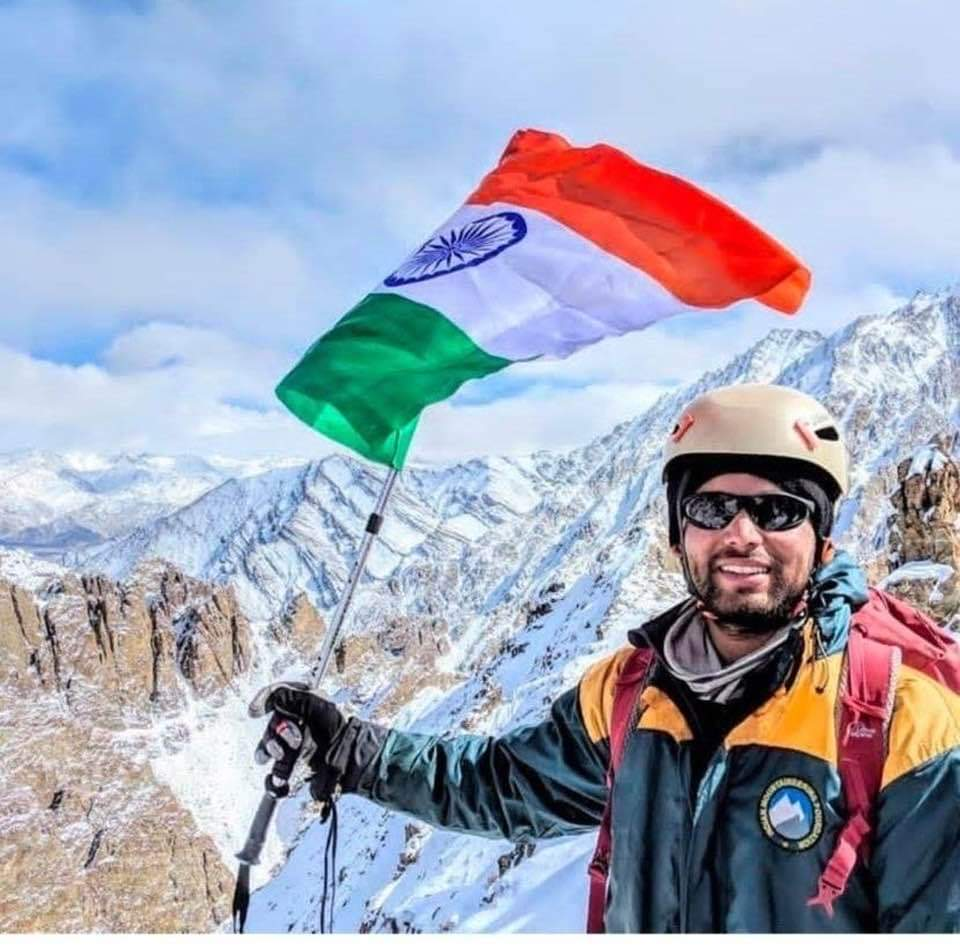
- Amgoth Tukaram during a mountaineering expedition

Personal information
- Nationality: Indian
- Born: 1998 (age 27–28) Takkallapally Thanda, Yacharam mandal, Ranga Reddy district, Telangana, India
- Occupation: Mountaineer

Climbing career
- Major ascents: Mount Kilimanjaro (2018), Mount Everest (2019), Mount Elbrus (2019), Aconcagua (2020), Mount Kosciuszko (2020)

Amgoth Tukaram (born 1998) is an Indian mountaineer from Telangana. He has climbed major peaks in Asia, Africa, Europe, South America and Australia, including Mount Everest, Mount Kilimanjaro, Mount Elbrus, Aconcagua and Mount Kosciuszko.

Tukaram's mountaineering career developed through the National Cadet Corps (NCC) and formal mountaineering training. His expeditions have also been associated with messages concerning environmental protection, road safety, healthy living, national pride and community support.

== Early life ==
Tukaram was born in Takkallapally Thanda in Yacharam mandal of Ranga Reddy district, Telangana. He was the youngest of five siblings and studied at a Tribal Welfare Residential School in Medak.

He became interested in the NCC after watching an NCC parade at the Parade Grounds in Hyderabad. He was subsequently selected through the NCC for mountaineering training.

== NCC and mountaineering training ==
Tukaram joined the Nehru Institute of Mountaineering in Uttarkashi in 2014 after being selected through the NCC for mountaineering training.

He completed a basic mountaineering course at the Nehru Institute of Mountaineering with an A grade and subsequently undertook advanced mountaineering training at the Jawahar Institute of Mountaineering and Winter Sports in Jammu and Kashmir. His training record included recognition for mountaineering technique.

His NCC experience and mountaineering training formed the foundation for his subsequent high-altitude expeditions.

== Mountaineering career ==
Tukaram's early Himalayan ascents included Mount Norbu in 2016, Mount Rudugaira in 2017 and Stok Kangri in 2017. He subsequently climbed major peaks in Africa, Asia, Europe, South America and Australia.

=== Major mountaineering achievements ===
Summit	Location	year	Significance
Mount Norbu	India	June 2016	Early Himalayan ascent associated with Telangana Formation Day.
Mount Rudugaira	India	June 2017	Himalayan ascent associated with a public message promoting Khadi.
Stok Kangri	India	July 2017	Expedition associated with the display of a large Indian national flag.
Mount Kilimanjaro	Tanzania, Africa	July 2018	Highest mountain in Africa; expedition associated with the Indian national flag and road-safety and helmet awareness.
Mount Everest	Nepal	22 May 2019	Summited via the South Col route; expedition associated with an environmental-awareness message.
Mount Elbrus	Russia, Europe	27 July 2019	Highest mountain in Europe according to the commonly used geographical convention; expedition associated with an anti-drug awareness message.
Aconcagua	Argentina, South America	January 2020	Highest mountain outside Asia; summit reached on India's Republic Day and associated with environmental messaging.
Mount Kosciuszko	Australia	March 2020	Highest mountain on mainland Australia; expedition associated with support for communities and wildlife affected by Australian bushfires.

=== Mount Kilimanjaro ===
In July 2018, Tukaram climbed Mount Kilimanjaro in Tanzania, the highest mountain in Africa. During the expedition, he carried the Indian national flag and promoted awareness of helmet use and road safety.

Following the ascent, Tukaram received public recognition and later met President Ram Nath Kovind.

=== Mount Everest ===
Tukaram climbed Mount Everest on 22 May 2019 using the South Col route from Nepal.

His Everest expedition followed his NCC experience and formal mountaineering training. Contemporary reports described him as a young mountaineer from South India and covered his expedition and environmental-awareness activities.

The expedition was associated with a message concerning protection of the five elements of nature and environmental awareness.

Following the ascent, Tukaram was felicitated by the NCC in recognition of his Everest achievement.

=== Mount Elbrus ===
On 27 July 2019, Tukaram climbed Mount Elbrus in Russia, which is commonly regarded as the highest mountain in Europe.

The Elbrus expedition was associated with an anti-drug awareness message.

=== Aconcagua ===
In January 2020, Tukaram climbed Aconcagua in Argentina, the highest mountain outside Asia.

The summit was reached on India's Republic Day, 26 January 2020. The expedition was associated with environmental and climate-awareness messaging, and the national anthem was sung at the summit.

=== Mount Kosciuszko ===
On 10 March 2020, Tukaram climbed Mount Kosciuszko, the highest mountain on mainland Australia.

The expedition was associated with support for communities and wildlife affected by the Australian bushfires. Tukaram also used the occasion to promote a message of peace and harmony.

== Social and environmental messages ==
Tukaram has associated several of his mountaineering expeditions with social and environmental awareness campaigns.

Summit	theme
Mount Norbu	Telangana state formation
Mount Rudugaira	Promotion of Khadi
Stok Kangri	Display of a large Indian national flag
Mount Kilimanjaro	Road safety and helmet awareness
Mount Elbrus	Anti-drug awareness
Mount Everest	Protection of nature and environmental awareness
Aconcagua	Environmental and climate awareness; Republic Day national anthem
Mount Kosciuszko	Support for communities and wildlife affected by Australian bushfires; peace and harmony

Contemporary reporting has described the use of mountaineering expeditions as a means of communicating these messages.

== Public-awareness activities ==
Tukaram's expeditions have been associated with messages concerning environmental protection, road safety, healthy living, national pride and community support.

The Kilimanjaro expedition promoted helmet use and road safety.

The Everest expedition was associated with environmental protection and a message concerning the five elements of nature.

The Aconcagua expedition promoted environmental and climate awareness and included the singing of India's national anthem at the summit.

The Kosciuszko expedition was associated with support for communities and wildlife affected by Australian bushfires and with a message of peace and harmony.

== Education ==
Tukaram studied political science and was associated with Noble Degree and PG College in Hyderabad, according to contemporary profiles.

His development as a mountaineer was influenced by NCC training and specialist instruction at the Nehru Institute of Mountaineering and the Jawahar Institute of Mountaineering and Winter Sports.

== Recognition and awards ==
Tukaram has received recognition from government institutions, the NCC and sporting organisations for his mountaineering and sporting achievements.

Institution / occasion	Recognition	Date / year	Significance
Government of Telangana	Best Sportsman Award	June 2015	State-level recognition for sporting achievement.
National Cadet Corps / Air Commodore N. N. Reddy	Award presented during the 71st NCC Raising Day celebration at Secunderabad Parade Grounds	June 2015	Institutional recognition associated with NCC and sporting activities.
Jawahar Institute of Mountaineering and Winter Sports, Pahalgam	Mountaineering Course Certificate, Grade "A"	August 2016	Training recognition; records associated with the course note recognition for technique.
Government of Telangana	Best Sportsman Award	June 2018	State-level sporting recognition.
Rashtrapati Bhavan	Meeting with President Ram Nath Kovind	July 2018	National-level recognition following his mountaineering achievements.
National Cadet Corps	Felicitation for Everest achievement	August 2019	Institutional recognition following his Mount Everest ascent.
Office of the Governor of Telangana	Recognition associated with former Governor E. S. L. Narasimhan	October 2019	State-level recognition.
Union Ministry of Youth Affairs and Sports	Recognition and encouragement	September 2020	Recognition associated with mountaineering and environmental messaging.
Sakshi Excellence Awards	Jury Special Recognition Award – Sport Category (Male)	2021	Recognition for sporting achievement.
National Cadet Corps	Appreciation Award	February 2022	Recognition associated with NCC leadership and mountaineering achievement.
Ministry of Youth Affairs and Sports, Government of India	Adventure Award	May 2025	Recognition for performance and dedication in adventure sports.

Amgoth Tukaram – Professional & Public-Service Profile (Report). 2026.

== See also ==
- Seven Summits
- National Cadet Corps (India)
- Nehru Institute of Mountaineering
- Mount Everest
- Mount Kilimanjaro
- Mount Elbrus
- Aconcagua
- Mount Kosciuszko
