= Jaahnavi Sriperambuduru =

Mountaineer from India

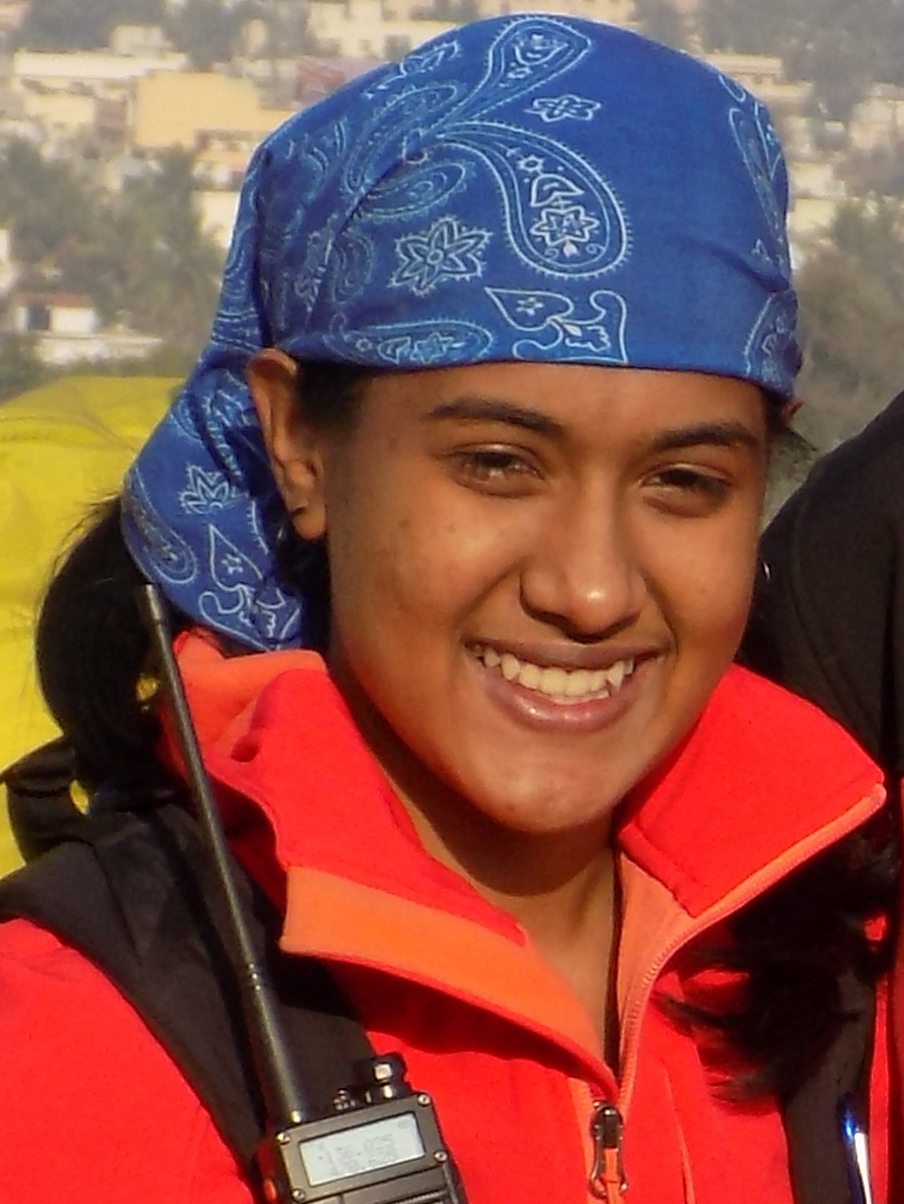
- Occupations: Professional Mountaineer & Guide and Motivational speaker
- Known for: The youngest girl to scale Mount Elbrus at the age of 13 years 8 months in 2015 and the youngest TEDx Speaker.

Jaahnavi Sriperambuduru is an Indian mountaineer and motivational speaker. She is on her mission to climb the highest peaks of all seven continents known as the Seven Summits and also to reach the farthest point on the globe "The South Pole" and "The North Pole".

She is on her pursuit for the Grand Slam to become the youngest Girl in the World in her Phase I climbs.

== Early life ==
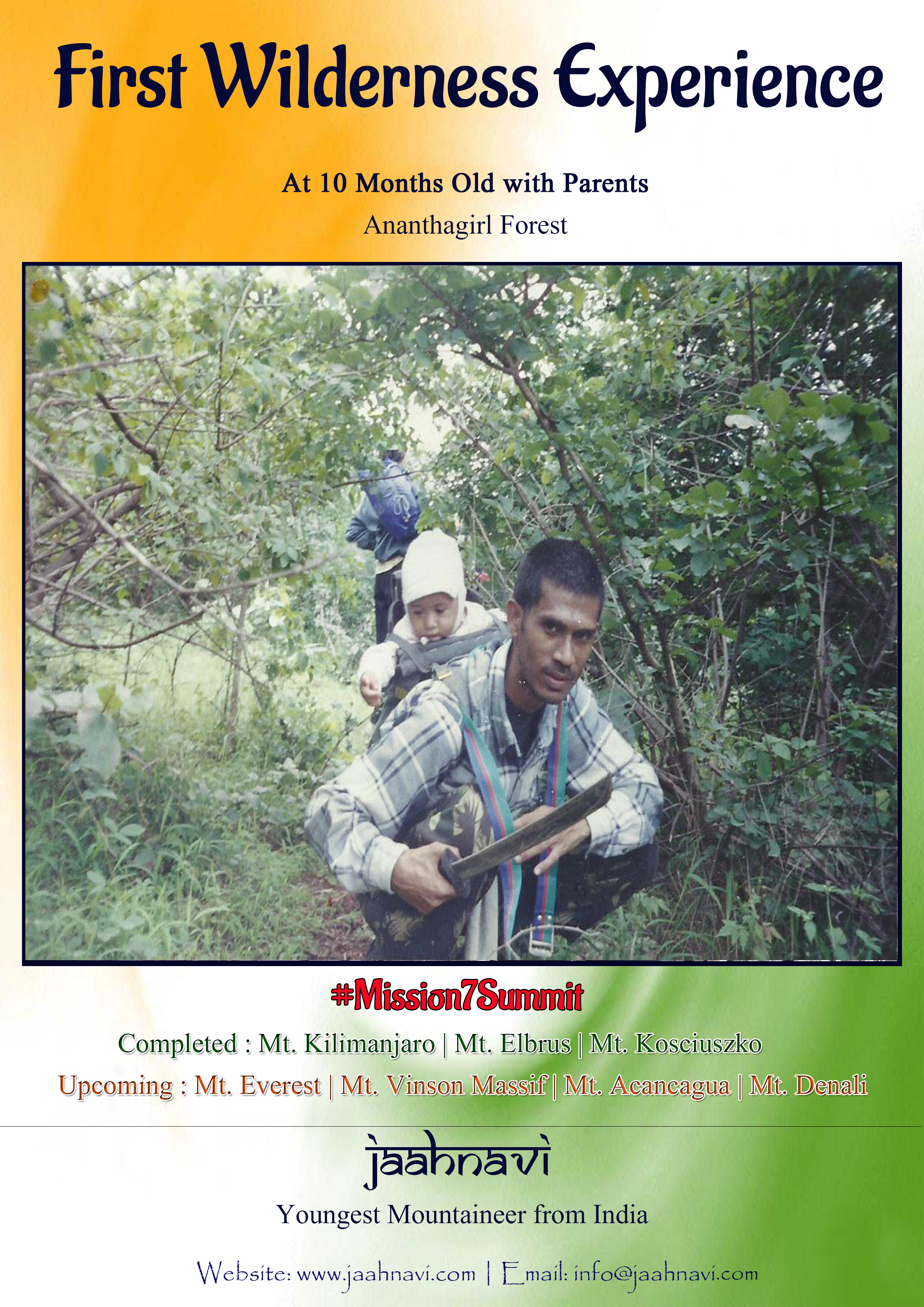

Jaahnavi started her wilderness career at a very tender age of 10 months only, along with her parents Dr. S. Krishna Rao (Father) and Mrs. S. Saraswathi (Mother). By the age 3 years, she used to accompany her father in different Treks and Expeditions along with other children. By the age of 10 years, she had completed nearly 2 High Altitude Treks, 5 National Treks, and around 25 Local Treks.

She is also a Bharatanatyam dancer and also a painter.

== Climbing career ==
Earlier, on 2 October 2014, Jaahnavi reached the summit of Kilimanjaro (5,895 m), the highest mountain in Africa.

She also became the youngest Indian to climb the highest peak of Australia - Mount Kosciuszko (2,228 m). She also completed the Aussie 10 Challenge in 4 days, by climbing all the 10 highest peaks of Snowy mountains.

In February 2016, she created yet another unique record, by becoming the youngest Mount Everest Base Camp trek guide. She accomplished this assignment by guiding a 10 years old girl and her mother after training them both for nearly 3 months with the help of her coach Nagapuri Ramesh and her Father Dr. S. Krishna Rao.

Her another accomplishment is North America's highest peak Denali in the month of July 2016 along which she also became the first Indian born Telugu girl to be invited to the White House to take part in National South Asian Symposium wherein she got an opportunity to interact with the high officials of the First Lady's office and the President.

In 2017 she had another feather to her list as she trained and guided the largest contingent of school students of 28 students aged from 7 years to 16 years to Everest Base Camp and became a global record.

On the auspicious day of Janmashtami 2018, she made yet another unique record by summiting a virgin peak in Stok range of the Himalayas in the north-west region of India. She is awaiting documentation from the agency.

=== Mission7Summit climbs ===
Peak Name	Country/Continent	Height (m)	Climbed/Attempted On	Climb Age	Remarks
Mount Kilimanjaro	Africa	5895	2 Oct 2014	12 Years 11 Months	Youngest Indian / Asian to Summit
Mount Elbrus	Europe	5642	31 Jul 2015	13 Years 8 Months	Youngest Indian / World's Youngest Girl to Summit
Mount Kosciusko	Australia	2228	11 Dec 2015	14 Years 1 Month	Youngest Indian to Summit
Denali (Mount McKinley)	North America	6194	10 July 2016	14 Years 8 Months	Youngest Indian to Accomplish
Mount Aconcagua	South America	6962	To attempt	-	-
Mount Vinson Massif	Antarctica	4897	To attempt	-	-
Mount Everest	Asia	8850	Attempted in 2019	18 years 5 months	-

These are part of Jaahnavi's #Mission7Summit, through which she wants to climb the tallest peaks of every continent so as to raise funds to educate the underprivileged girls in India.

=== Other notable climbs ===
Peak Name	Country/Continent	Height (m)	Climbed/Attempted On	Climb Age (years)	Remarks
Stok Kangri	India	6125	14 Aug 2014	12	Youngest Indian Girl
Mount Yala Peak	Nepal	5520	Feb 2015	13	Youngest Indian Girl
Everest Base Camp	Khumbu Valley/Nepal	5380	10 Mar 2016	14	Youngest Indian Guide
Island Peak (Imja Tse)	Khumbu Valley/Nepal	6189	11 Oct 2017	15	Youngest Indian Girl
Everest Base Camp	Khumbu Valley/Nepal	5380	18 Oct 2017	15	Guided the Largest contingent of students in the World from India
Mount Friendship peak	Manali	5289	30 Sep 2022	21	-

== Motivation ==
Apart from her regular mountaineering passion, Jaahnavi works for the development of girl child in India. She wants to raise funds from her climbing and educate underprivileged girls and train them with life skills. Her ultimate dream is to make each and every girl child of India tough and educate them through her NGO under the name JanJay Foundation.

Jaahnavi is also a Motivational Speaker and gives the talk and inspires not only youth but also adults and takes part in different symposiums and discussions. She goes around villages and suburbs to educate girls and also gives talks in schools, colleges and different organisations including MNC's.

She also became the youngest speaker for the TEDxHyderabad 2016 and was also the special invitee speaker for TEDxBVRIT.

On 3 November 2017, she was the youngest speaker in TEDxDSCEWomen in Bangalore.

She gives commercials related to girl empowerment and sends messages for girl stereotypes for gender equality.

Her recent campaign #AmPrettyTough through one of the leading cosmetic company of India, Dabur Gulabari, has brought about a major change in the thought process of "Don't judge a book by its cover". In this campaign, Jaahnavi was shown as a girly girl. She takes parts in different activities to promote her Mission and spread the Word #AmPrettyTough breaking the gender equality.

She also organizes different outdoor activities along with trekking & hiking for kids & girls under her banner JanJay Adventures. She has organized many activities to develop the confidence among the girls and move ahead.

== Speaking assignments ==
- Youth Symposium in The White House - USA
- TEDx Hyderabad Youngest Speaker - Hyderabad
- TEDx WomenDSCE - Bangalore
- TEDx Bocconi - Mumbai
- TEDx BVrit - Hyderabad
- Gender Equality - IIM Indore
- Key Note Speaker - Toastmasters District 92, semi-Annual Meet - Bangalore
- Key Note Speaker - IWN Telanga Annual Day

== Achievements and awards ==
- TV 9 Naveena Mahila Awards - Young Achiever of the Year - 2015
- Rotary International Vocational Award - 2015
- Youngest Speaker of TEDxHyderabad - 2016
- MegaTV National Awards - Young Achiever of the Year - 2016

== See also ==
- Mountaineering in India
- Seven Summits
