= Umesh Zirpe =

Indian mountaineer

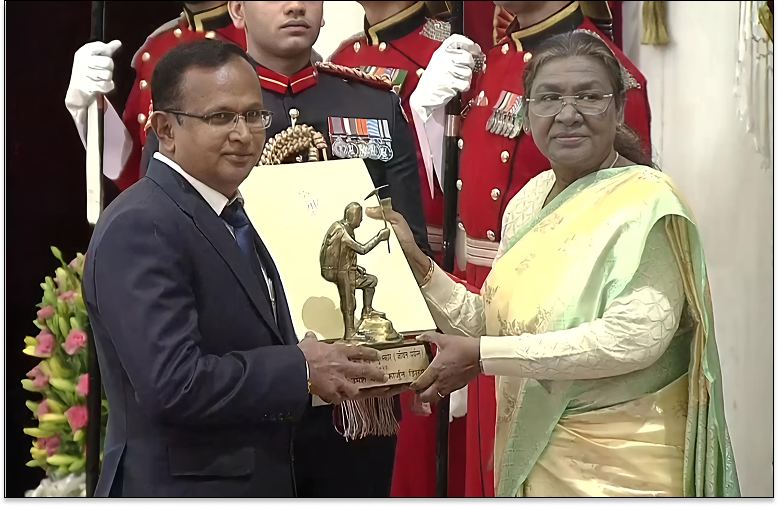
- Receiving Tenzing Norgay National Adventure Award at the hands of Honorable President of India, Smt Droupadi Murmu.
- Born: Pune, Maharashtra, India
- Occupations: Mountaineer and Mentor
- Known for: Leading multiple 8,000 m Himalayan expeditions; member of Giripremi mountaineering club
- Awards: Tenzing Norgay National Adventure Award (2023), Shiv Chhatrapati Award

Umesh Zirpe is an Indian mountaineer. He is also known by the name "मामाजी (Mamaji)" by the mountaineering fraternity in India. Zirpe is an expedition leader, and senior member of the Giripremi mountaineering club, a mountaineering club in Pune, Maharashtra.

Zirpe is known in the mountaineering community for leading successful expeditions to eight of the fourteen eight-thousander highest mountains in the world. These include Mount Everest, Lhotse, Makalu, Manaslu, Cho Oyu, Dhaulagiri, Kanchenjunga, and Annapurna-1. He has also led expeditions to some of the other technically difficult peaks including Mount Shivling, Mount Manda, and Mount Meru.

== Early life and mountaineering career ==
Zirpe joined the Giripremi mountaineering club in Pune in 1986 to promote mountaineering sports in the society. He planned expeditions to several unexplored and technically demanding mountain peaks. In his early mountaineering journey, he attempted peaks including Manda-1, Satopanth, Thelu, and led expedition to Mt. Shivling.

He led the club’s first Everest expedition in 2012, followed by ascents of Lhotse in 2013, Makalu in 2014, Cho Oyu, Dhaulagiri in 2016, Manaslu in 2017, and Kanchenjunga in 2019. He scaled Mount Mera at the age of 54 in a solo attempt in October 2019.

In 2023, he led the first successful Indian ascent of Mount Meru’s 6,600-metre high central peak. The documentary film of this expedition, The Ascent of Mt. Meru was screened in several International Adventure Film Festivals including the Torello Mountain Film Festival 19th Edition in Spain.

For his contribution to the field of mountaineering, he was awarded the Tenzing Norgay National Adventure Award under the Life Time Achievement category for 2023.

Zirpe was also involved in the foundation of Maharashtra's first mountaineering training institute, Guardian Giripremi Institute of Mountaineering, which was founded in 2015. Along with promotion of Mountaineering sports to masses, he contributed for the inclusion of mountaineering in Indian education. In 2020, Savitribai Phule Pune University adopted a Diploma Course in Mountaineering and Allied Sports.

Along with mountaineering, Zirpe has been active in community initiatives related to mountains and mountaineers. During natural disasters such as the Nepal earthquake, Uttarakhand flash floods, and COVID-19 pandemic, he took part in relief and rescue work. Zirpe is current President of Akhil Maharashtra Giryarohan Mahasangh, an organization of mountaineering in Maharashtra. Zirpe was also invited as one of the committee members of Fort Conservation Committee by Government of Maharashtra.

Zirpe supported the Chhatrapati Shivaji Sherpa Social Project which was established for the betterment and upliftment of Sherpa people in Solu-Khumbu, Nepal. In and around his hometown, Zirpe has been involved in works including environment conservation, sports promotion, training underprivileged youth for mountaineering sport.

== Awards ==
- Tenzing Norgay National Adventure Award for lifetime achievement in mountaineering (2023).
- Shiv Chhatrapati Award by the Government of Maharashtra.
- Sahyadriratna Puraskar by the Sate level Conclave of Mountaineering.
- Sanskriti Award for Outstanding Achievements (National Award 2023) by the Sate level Conclave of Mountaineering.

== Publications ==
- Himalayateel Diwas (2023)
- Gosht Eka Dhaysachi - Everest (Marathi 2014, English translated 2022)
- Shikharratna Kanchenjunga (2022)
- Mountain-Men SHERPA (2021)
- Joy of Mountaineering (Marathi and English 2019)
- Parvatputra Sherpa (2019)

== See also ==
- Mountaineering in India
