= Rathong Glacier =

Glacier in Sikkim, India

Rathong
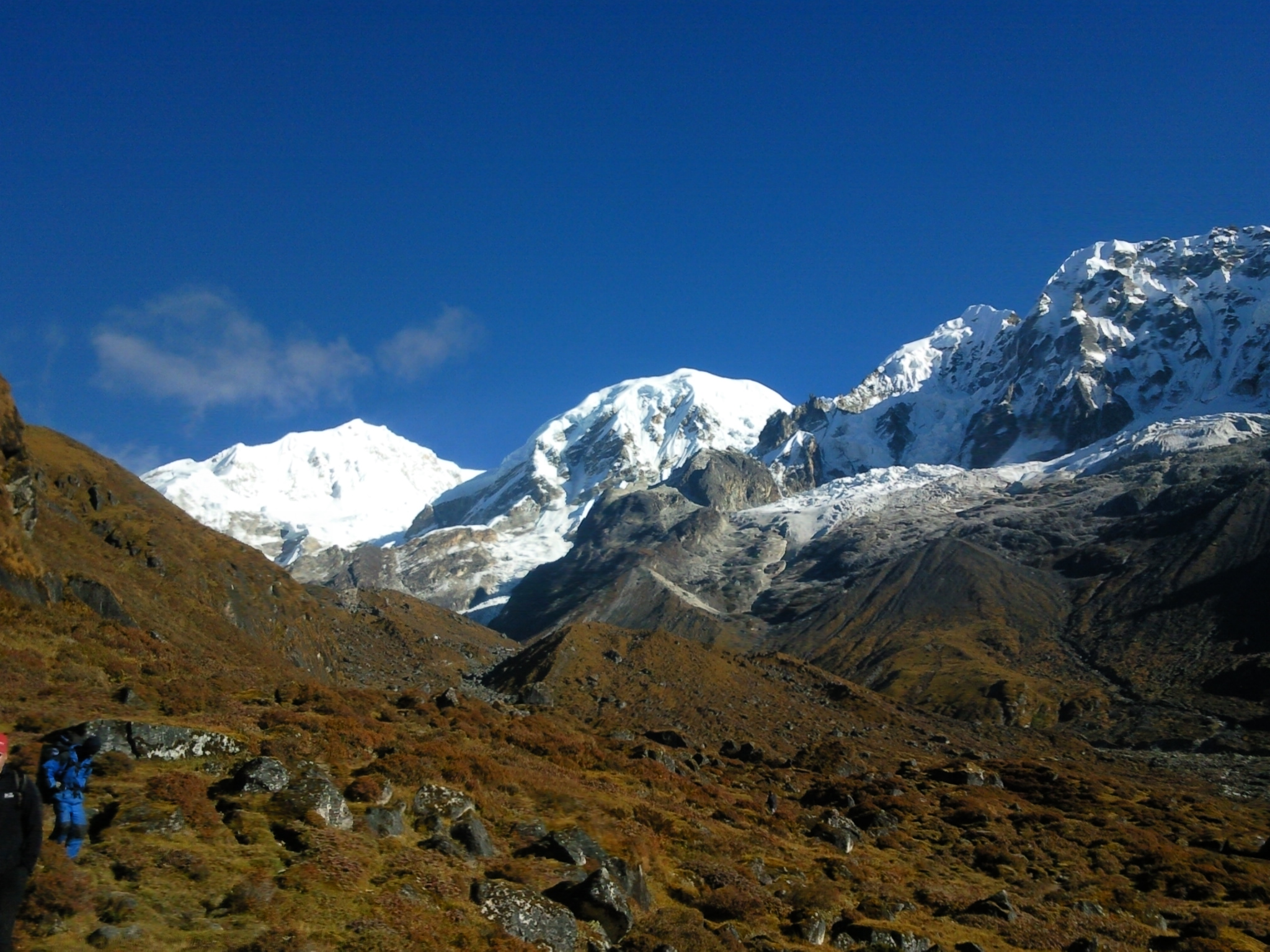
- View of Rathong Glacier

- Location within Sikkim Location within India
- Interactive map of Rathong
- Type: Valley glacier
- Location: Sikkim
- Coordinates: 27°34′03″N 88°06′22″E

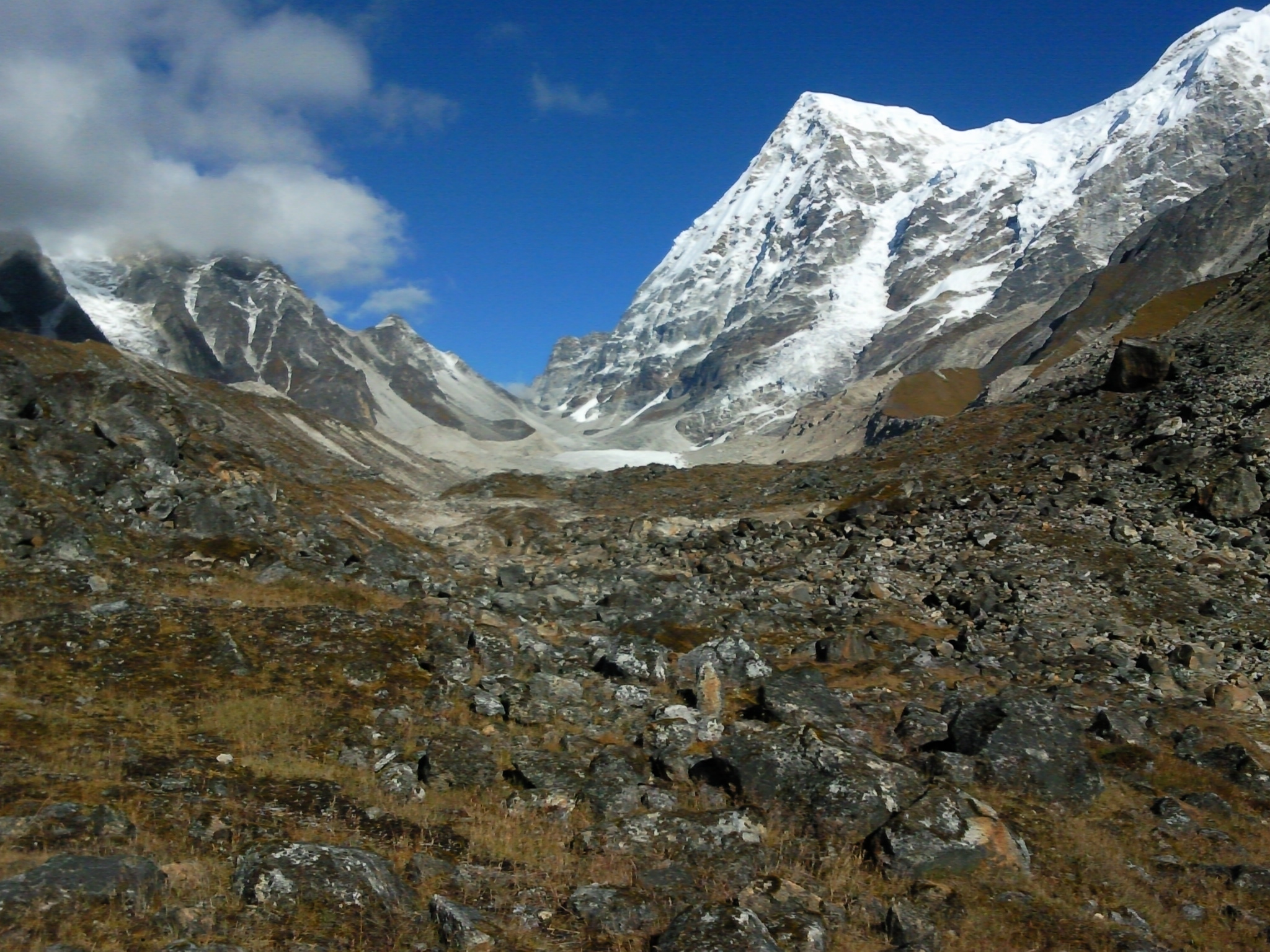
Rathong Glacier from Dzongri La (pass).

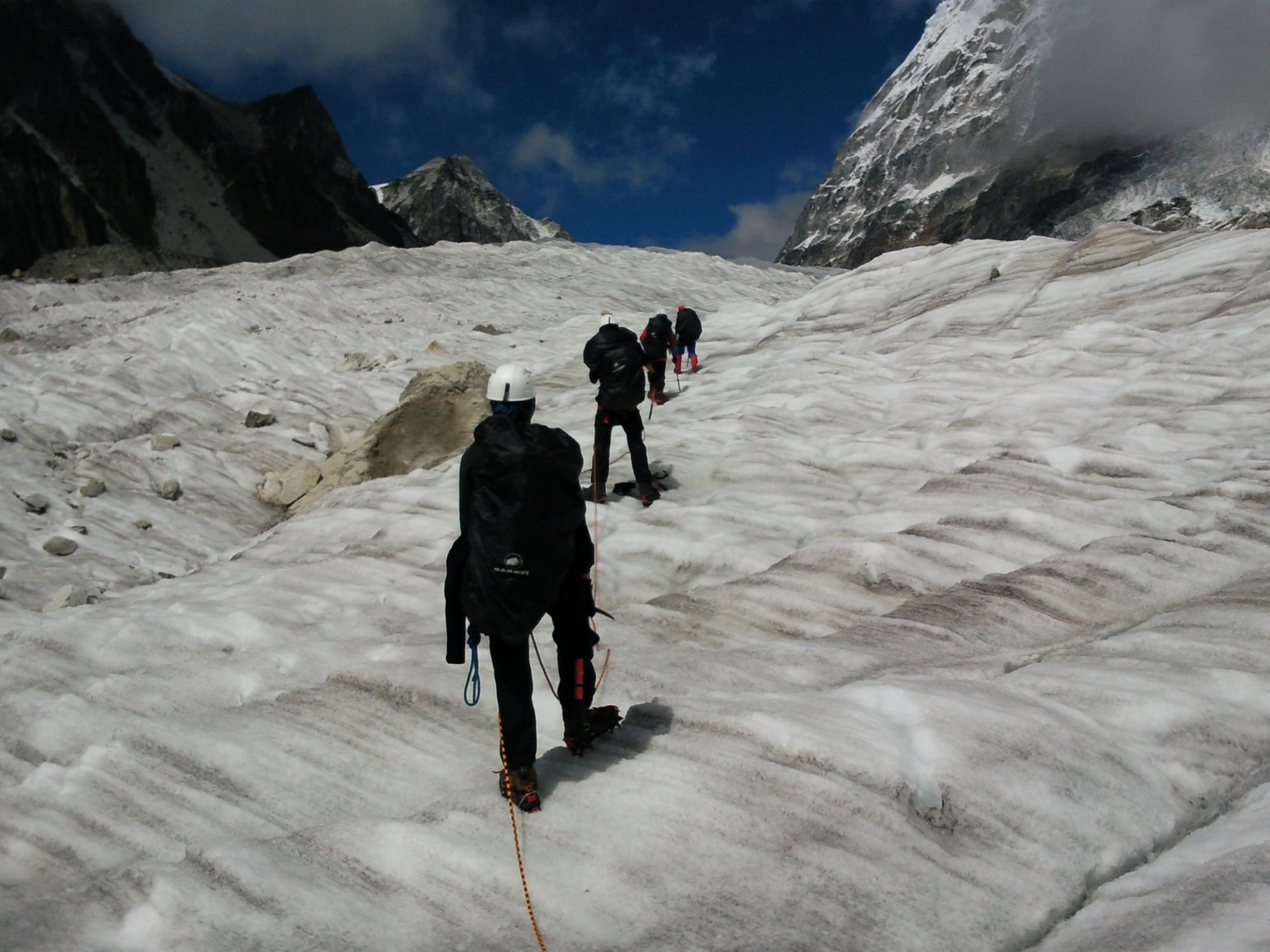
Climbers at the Rathong Glacier.

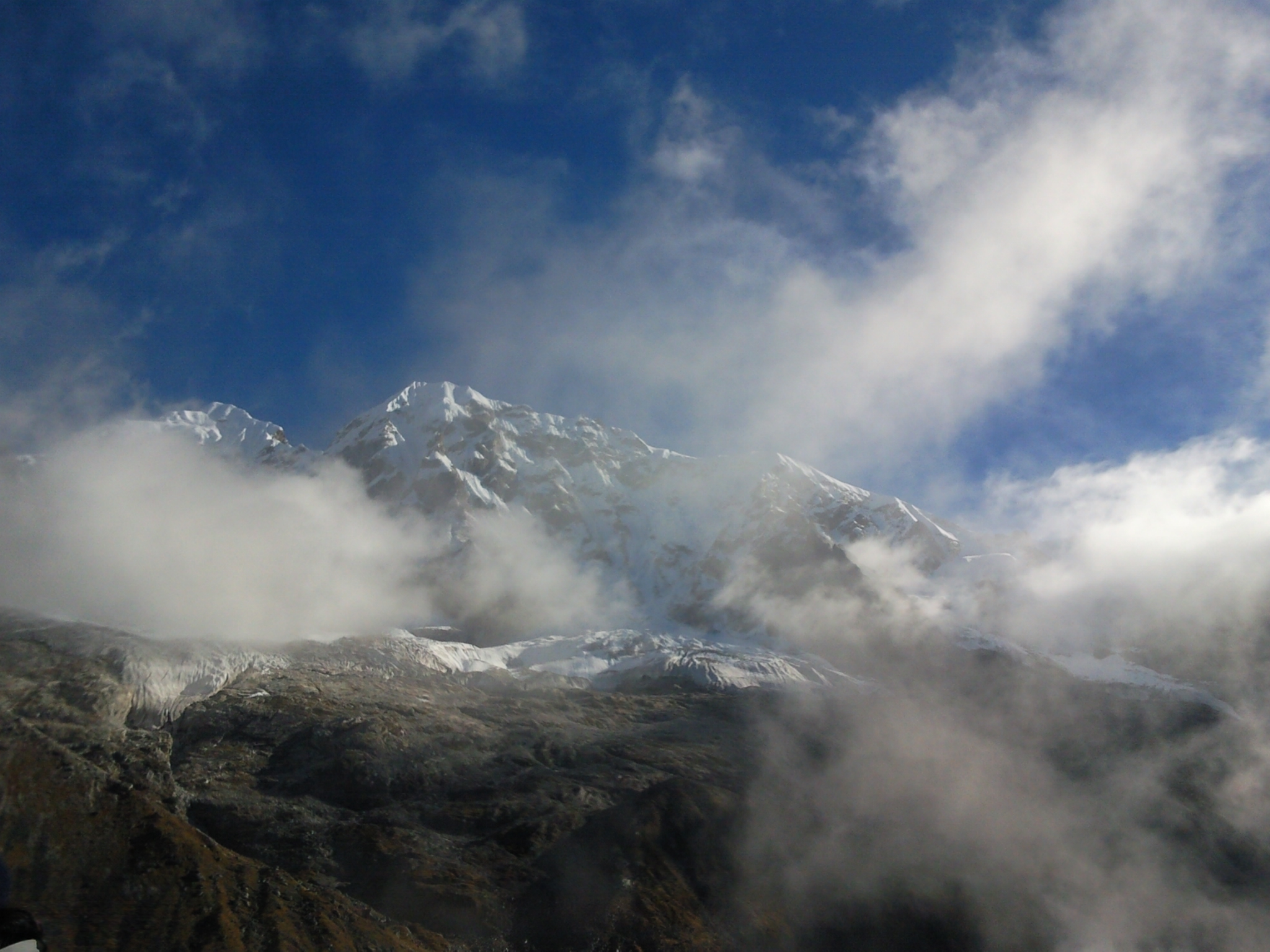
Rathong Glacier on the clouds.

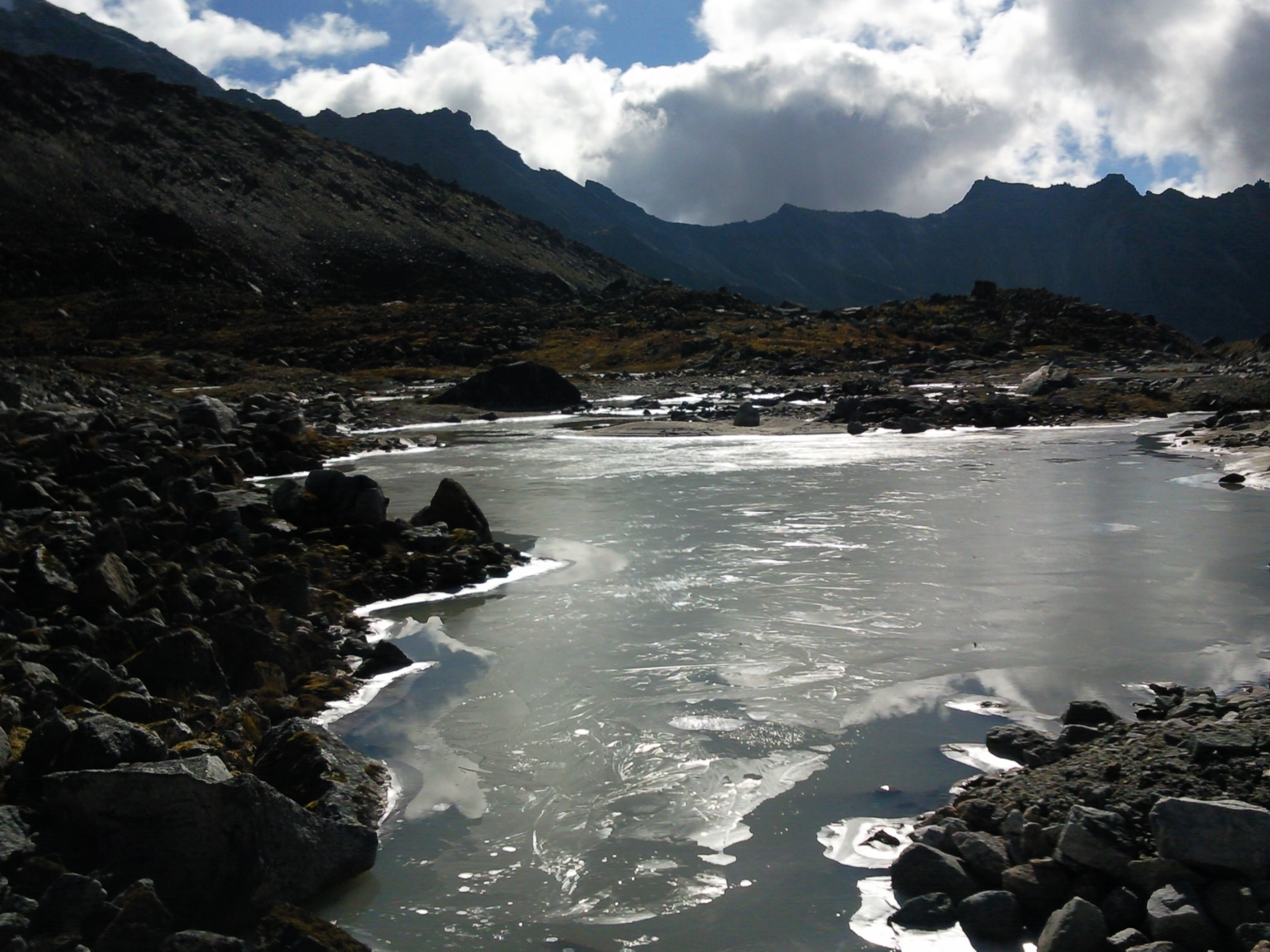
Rathong Glacier next to the lake.

Rathong is a glacier in West Sikkim district of India. It is the source of the Rathong river and extends from Rathong La in the north, to the top of Chowrikiang Valley in the south. It is fed by Mt. Rathong (6,678 metres (21,909 ft)) and the ice falls of the Kabru group of peaks. The Himalayan Mountaineering Institute of Darjeeling has set up a permanent base camp at Chowrikiang to impart ice-craft training in Rathong Glacier. Hence, the glacier is well known to mountaineers all over the world. At present, due to global warming, the glacier is receding rapidly and a number of glacial lakes have formed.

== See also ==
- List of glaciers
