= Ranveer Jamwal =

Indian mountaineer (born 1975)

Ranveer Singh Jamwal
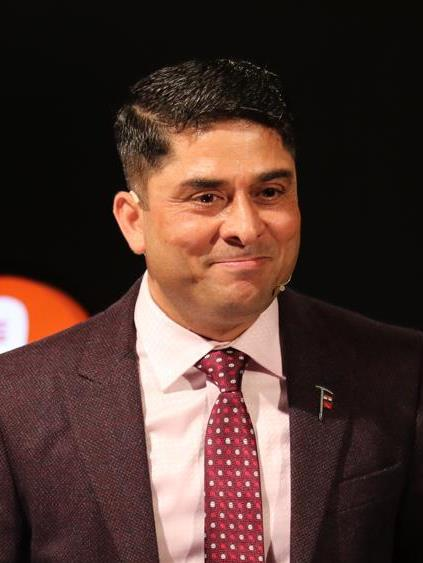
- Col. Ranveer Singh Jamwal
- Born: 26 December 1975 (age 50); Badhori, Samba district, Jammu and Kashmir, India
- Spouse: Kiran Jamwal
- Military career
- Allegiance: India
- Branch: Indian Army
- Service years: 1994–present
- Rank: Colonel
- Awards: Vishisht Seva Medal (BAR) Sena Medal

Colonel Ranveer Singh Jamwal (born 26 December 1975) is a serving Indian Army officer and a mountaineer. He has specialisation in search and rescue missions and serves as the director of the National Institute of Mountaineering and Adventure Sports (NIMAS) in Dirang, Arunachal Pradesh.

Jamwal has participated in over 70 mountaineering expeditions and in every continent. He currently holds several achievements to his credit, including one world record, two Asian records, and four Indian records.

== Early life and education ==
Ranveer Singh Jamwal was born on 26 December 1975 in Badhori, Samba district, Jammu and Kashmir, into a military family. His father, Onkar Singh, served as a Havildar in the Indian Army. He completed his schooling at Army School, Ratnuchak, before qualifying the Army Cadet College (ACC) examination and joining the Indian Military Academy, Dehradun, in 1998.

In 2003, Jamwal completed all four skiing and mountaineering courses at the High Altitude Warfare School (HAWS), Gulmarg. He later specialised in search and rescue operations at the Swiss Mountain School, Andermatt, in 2007.

== Mountaineering achievements ==
Jamwal became involved in outdoor adventure activities such as trekking, white-water rafting, and cycling in 1999. After completing mountaineering and skiing courses, he was appointed as an instructor at the High Altitude Warfare School (HAWS) in 2006. In 2007, he climbed Mount Machoi (5,658 metres), marking the beginning of his mountaineering career.

=== Seven Summits ===
Continent	Peak	Date
Africa	Mount Kilimanjaro	23 October 2010
Asia	Mount Everest	25 May 2012, 19 May 2013, 19 May 2016
South America	Aconcagua	1 January 2013
Europe	Mount Elbrus	26 June 2014
Australia	Carstensz Pyramid	9 October 2015
North America	Denali	20 June 2017
Antarctica	Vinson Massif	4 January 2019

=== Mount Everest expeditions ===
- 2012: Served as Deputy Leader of the Indian Army Everest Expedition, during which seven women officers summited Mount Everest, setting a national record.
- 2013: Led the Indo-Nepal Everest Expedition to commemorate the 60th anniversary of the first ascent of Everest. All 20 members of the team successfully summited.
- 2015: Led the Indian contingent, but the expedition was called off due to the Nepal earthquake. The team conducted rescue operations at Everest Base Camp.
- 2016: Led a team that had attempted Everest in 2015, successfully guiding all 14 members to the summit.

=== Har Shikhar Tiranga Mission ===
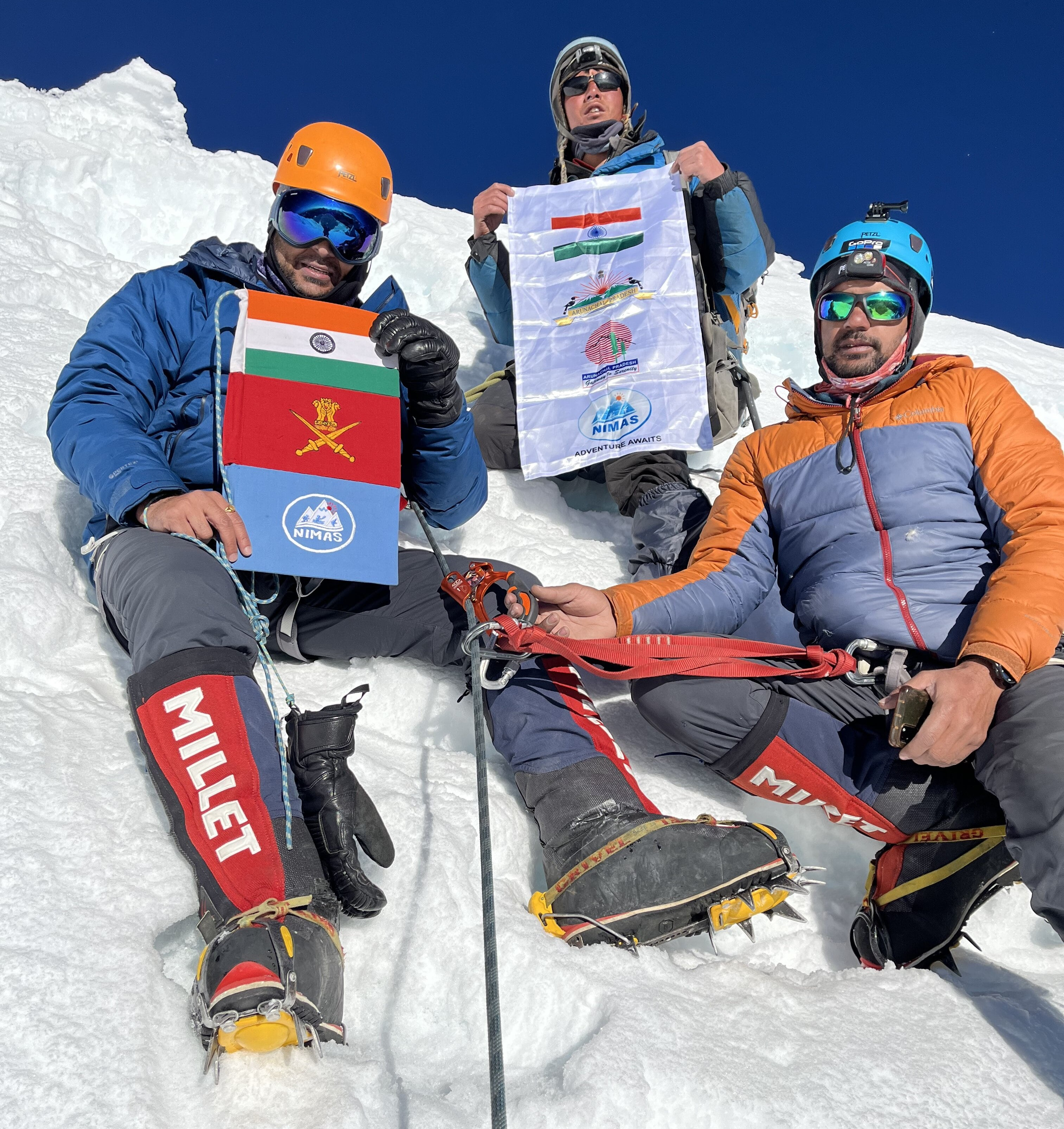
HAR SHIKHAR TIRANGA

In 2022, Colonel Ranveer Singh Jamwal began leading the Har Shikhar Tiranga Mission, a nationwide mountaineering initiative undertaken by the National Institute of Mountaineering and Adventure Sports (NIMAS). The mission aimed to hoist the Indian national flag at the highest peaks and designated high points of India's 28 states. Conceived and led by Jamwal, the campaign progressed through multiple phases of mountaineering expeditions across the country.

By March 2025, the Ministry of Defence confirmed that NIMAS had successfully completed climbs associated with 27 states, with Kangchenjunga (8,586 metres), the world's third-highest mountain, in Sikkim remaining as the final objective of the campaign.

A five-member NIMAS climbing team led by Jamwal subsequently undertook the Kangchenjunga expedition. On 18 May 2025, the team successfully reached the summit, marking the completion of the Har Shikhar Tiranga Mission. The expedition was reported as a historic achievement, completing the campaign to scale the highest designated peaks and high points across all 28 Indian states.

=== Cycling expeditions ===
In 2022, Jamwal led a seven-member cycling team that covered 1,100 km across all seven Northeastern states of India, becoming the first team to achieve this.

In February 2023, he led an expedition that cycled 5,374 km across six Southeast Asian nations in 37 days, setting new Asian and Indian records.

=== Brahmaputra rafting expedition ===
In January and February 2025, Jamwal led a NIMAS team on what was reported as the first complete rafting expedition along the 1,040-kilometre Indian stretch of the Brahmaputra River.

The expedition began at Gelling in Arunachal Pradesh and concluded at Hatsingimari in Assam. It was completed in 28 days, comprising 25 days of rafting and three days for equipment maintenance. The team navigated Class IV and V rapids during the Arunachal Pradesh section of the expedition.

=== Mount Kangchenjunga expedition ===
In 2025, Jamwal led a five-member NIMAS climbing team on an expedition to Kangchenjunga (8,586 metres), the world's third-highest mountain. The expedition was flagged off in March 2025 as part of NIMAS's Har Shikhar Tiranga campaign.

The team reached the summit on 18 May 2025. Contemporary reporting described the ascent as the culmination of the Har Shikhar Tiranga campaign.

=== Ladakh expedition ===
In 2026, Colonel Ranveer Singh Jamwal led a 20-member expedition from the National Institute of Mountaineering and Adventure Sports (NIMAS) that achieved the first recorded ascents of 20 previously unclimbed peaks above 6,000 metres in Ladakh within 23 days. The expedition covered the Chamser–Lungser, Gyama Nala and Chokula areas of the Ladakh Range. The Times of India described the achievement as NIMAS's third consecutive world record in three years. On 25 September 2026, Defence Minister Rajnath Singh formally welcomed the expedition team and commended its historic achievement.

== Rescue operations ==
Jamwal has participated in several high-altitude rescue operations, including:

- Mount Nanda Devi East (2007)
- Mount Chaukhamba (2008)
- Mount Naini Post, Gurez Valley, Jammu and Kashmir (2009)
- Mount Kedar Dome (2012)
- Everest Base Camp (2015)

== Awards and recognition ==
Jamwal has received several military and civilian honours in recognition of his achievements in mountaineering:

- Vishisht Seva Medal (2013) and Bar to Vishisht Seva Medal (2014)
- Tenzing Norgay National Adventure Award (2013)
- Sher-e-Kashmir Award for Outstanding Sportsperson of Jammu and Kashmir (2016)
- Multiple Chief of Army Staff Commendation Cards (2010, 2012, 2017, 2019)
- Gold Medal for Excellence in Mountaineering from the Indian Mountaineering Foundation (2018)
- Sena Medal (2022)
- MacGregor Medal (2024) for Operational Reconnaissance and Extreme Adventure Sports.

== Gallery ==
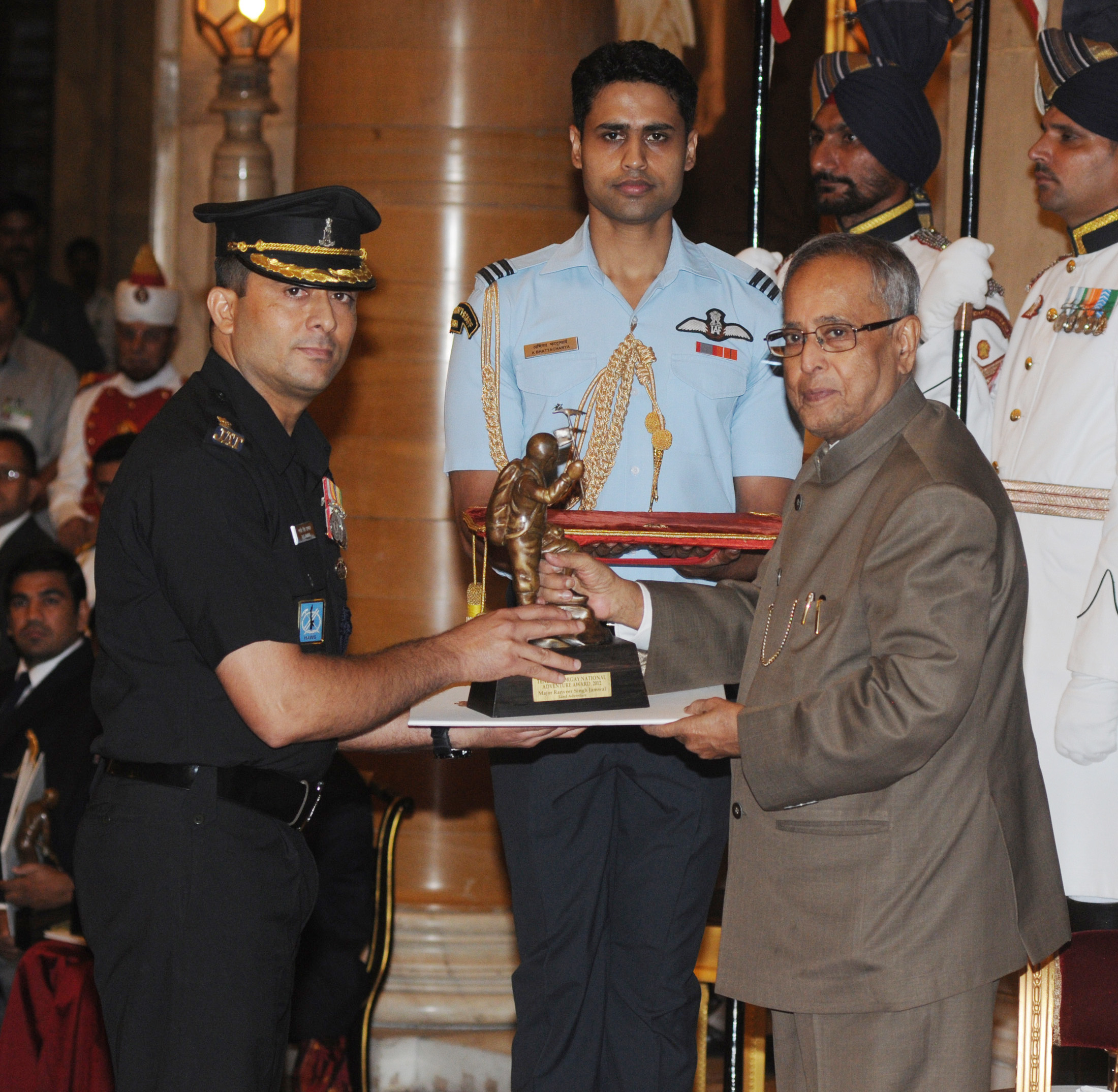
President of India Pranab Mukherjee presenting the Tenzing Norgay National Adventure Award-2012 at Rashtrapati Bhawan, in New Delhi.

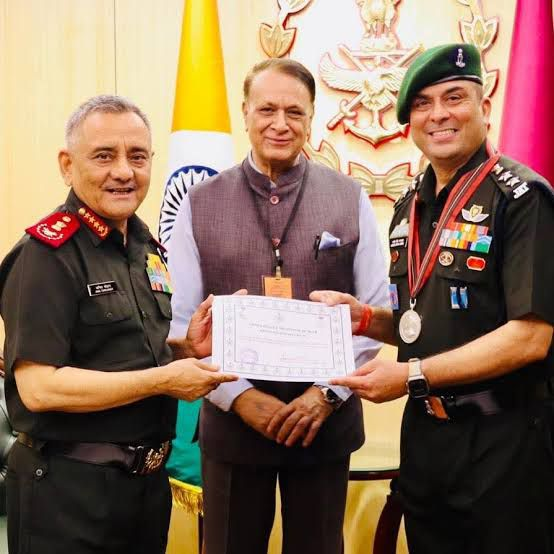
Jamwal receiving the MacGregor Medal-2024 from Chief of Defence Staff General Anil Chauhan

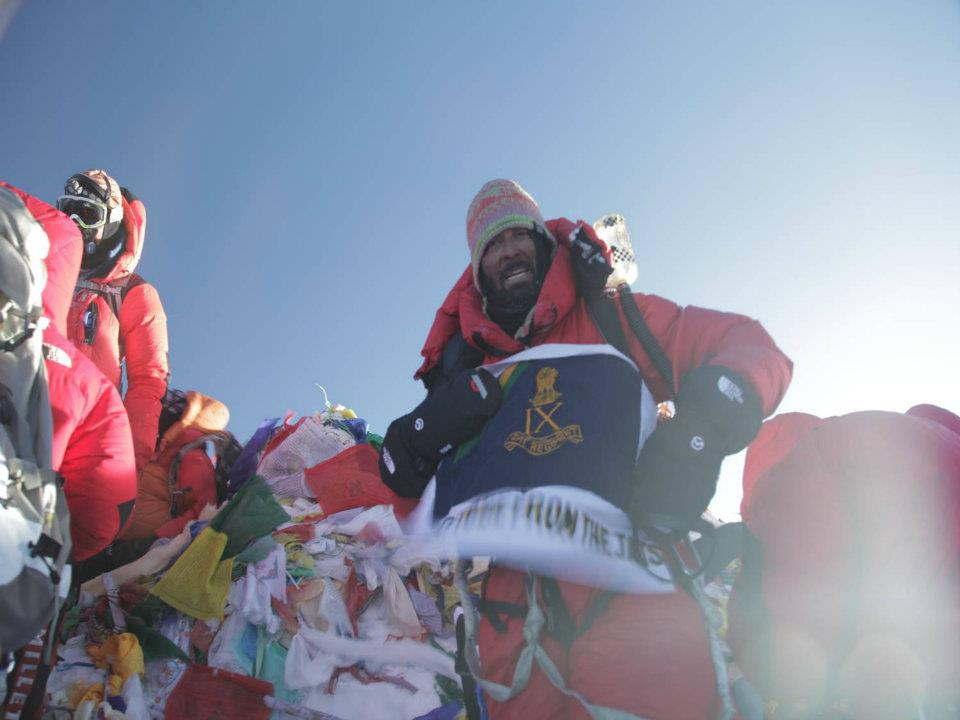
Jamwal at the Mount Everst.

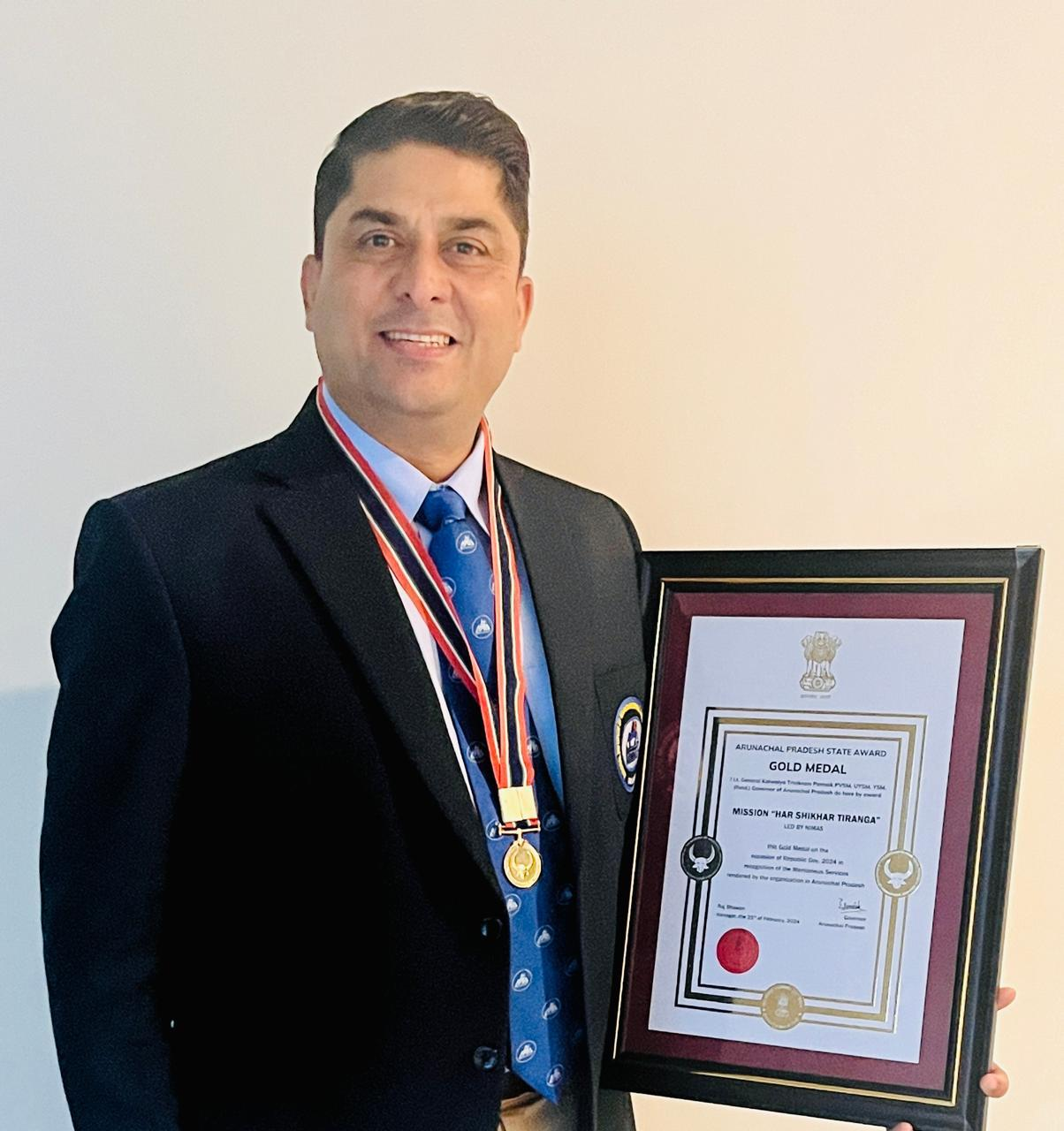
Jamwal after receiving Arunachal Pradesh State Award.

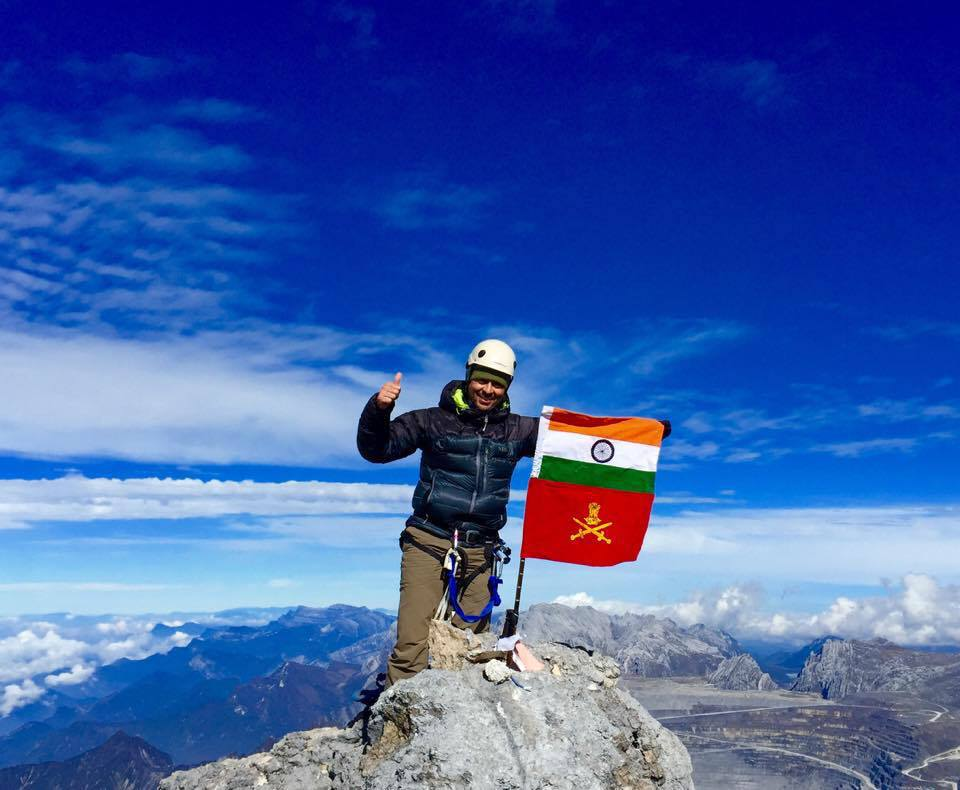
Col Jamwal at the top of Puncak Jaya, the highest peak in Oceania.
