= Giripremi =

Indian mountaineering club

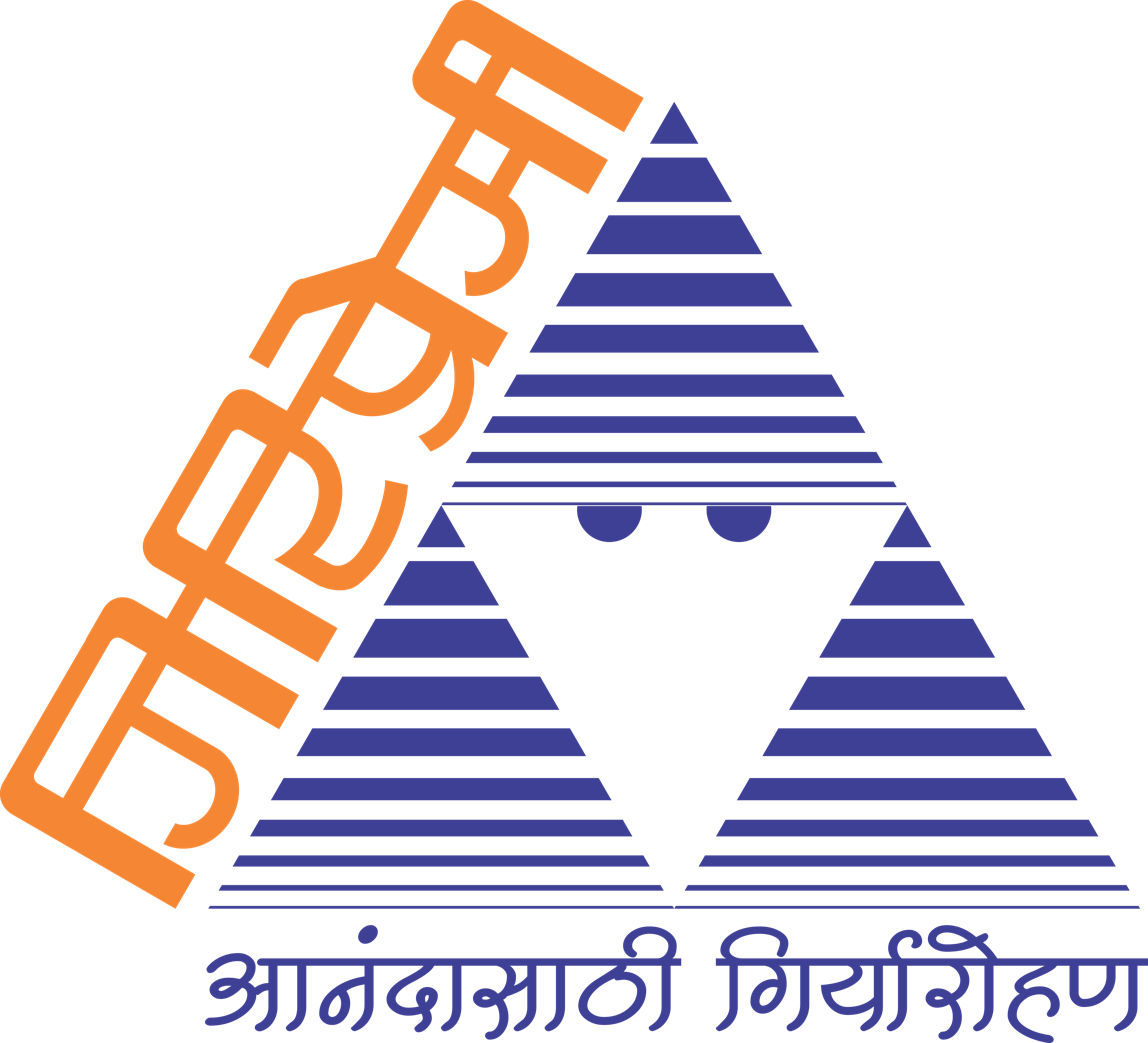
- Mountaineering for Happiness
- Formation: 1982
- Type: Public charitable trust
- Purpose: Promotion of mountaineering
- Headquarters: Pune, Maharashtra, India
- President: Jayant Tulpule
- Key people: Ushaprabha Page, Anand Palande, Umesh Zirpe, Jayant Tulpule, Ashish Mane, Jitendra Gaware, Krishna Dhokle
- Website: www.giripremi.com

The Giripremi is a public charitable trust and mountaineering club based in Pune, Maharashtra, India. Founded in 1982, it is one of the leading mountaineering organisations in the country and is the only Indian club to have successfully scaled eight peaks over 8,000 metres: Mount Everest, Lhotse, Makalu, Cho Oyu, Dhaulagiri, Manaslu, Kangchenjunga, and Annapurna I.

== History ==
Giripremi was established in 1982 by a group of mountaineers from Pune, including Anand Palande and Ushaprabha Page, with the aim of promoting mountaineering and outdoor adventure in India. Over four decades, the club has organised and led expeditions to some of the world's highest and most challenging peaks.

== Major expeditions ==
- Mount Everest: Giripremi successfully organised expeditions to Mount Everest, with team members reaching the summit in 2012, marking one of the most significant achievements for an Indian mountaineering club.
- Lhotse, Makalu, and Cho Oyu: Following Everest, Giripremi mountaineers summited Lhotse, Makalu, and Cho Oyu, further adding to the list of 8,000 m peaks scaled by the club.
- Dhaulagiri: In 2019, Giripremi mountaineers scaled Dhaulagiri, the world’s seventh-highest mountain at 8,167 m.
- Manaslu: In 2017, the club organised an expedition to Manaslu, the world’s eighth-highest peak, successfully placing multiple climbers on the summit.
- Kangchenjunga: In May 2019, Giripremi’s Kangchenjunga expedition reached the 8,586 m summit, making it the only Indian club to have scaled seven of the 8,000 m peaks by that time.
- Annapurna I: In April 2021, three members of Giripremi summited Annapurna I, the tenth-highest mountain in the world, completing the club’s 8,000 m peak list.
- Mount Meru: In September 2023, Giripremi became the first Indian mountaineering club to successfully climb Mount Meru’s main summit.

== Notable members ==
- Umesh Zirpe – Recipient of the Tenzing Norgay National Adventure Award and the Shiv Chhatrapati Sports Award.
- Ashish Mane – Leading Indian high-altitude climber.
- Jitendra Gaware – Shiv Chhatrapati Sports Awardee.
- Krishna Dhokle – Shiv Chhatrapati Sports Awardee.

== Publications ==
Giripremi members have authored several books on mountaineering, available on major online bookstores:

- Dongaryatra – by Anand Palande
- Ekand Shiledar – by Ushaprabha Page
- Base Camp Varun – by Jayant Tulpule
- Everest – by Umesh Zirpe
- Shikharratna Kangchenjunga – by Umesh Zirpe and Bhushan Harshe
- Sherpa – by Umesh Zirpe

== Training and education ==
Giripremi was instrumental in founding the Guardian Giripremi Institute of Mountaineering (GGIM), which offers the only recognised diploma course in mountaineering in India.

== Recognition ==
In 2023, the Southern Command of the Indian Army felicitated Giripremi with the “Sword of Regalia” for its contribution to Indian mountaineering.

== See also ==
- Mountaineering in India
- Guardian Giripremi Institute of Mountaineering
