= Jawahar Institute of Mountaineering and Winter Sports =

The Jawahar Institute of Mountaineering and Winter Sports was established in 1983 in Aru, Pahalgam, when chief minister of Jammu and Kashmir suggested its creation to Prime Minister Indira Gandhi. The institute was formed on the lines of other national mountaineering institutes in the country (i.e., the Himalayan Mountaineering Institute and the Nehru Institute of Mountaineering). Aru was chosen as a natural location for the institute with its rolling hills and easy access to mountain passes. The institute currently offers training in mountaineering courses, skiing courses and adventure Courses.

== History ==
Under the direction of the Central Government, a reconnaissance team, under Brigadier General Gyan Singh selected the site for the institute in Aru village, Pahalgam. In 1983, the institute was registered under the Registration of Societies Act No XXI of 1980 on 12 Sept. The first meeting of the institute was held in Feb, 1984 and it was decided that the institute would be head by a serving officer of the armed forces with experience in mountaineering activities. Lt Col SS Kahlon was chosen for the job by the Ministry of Defence. The State Government also agreed to transfer 101 acres of land in Aru village for the same. The first Basic Mountaineering Course was conducted in June–July 1985 with 17 students from a temporary hut in Aru. In the 1989, militancy rose to its peak in the Kashmir Valley and conflict engulfed the entire region.

== Activities ==
The institute currently undertakes the following activities:

=== Summer courses ===
During the pleasant summer season, the institute conducts its Basic and Advance Mountaineering Course. This institute also conducts Mountain Expeditions with Advance Mountaineering Course. The course fee is heavily subsidized by the Govt of India and the Govt of Jammu and Kashmir also sponsors a certain portion of the courses. These are graded courses and are accepted by all mountaineering bodies in the country. To boost adventure tourism in the state, the institute conducts regular and special adventure courses for adventure tourists.

=== Winter courses ===
During winters, the institute conducts Basic, Intermediate and Advanced Skiing in Aru and Pahalgam. It also conducts special courses for NDRF, SDRF on Mountain Search and Rescue.
