= Shivam Sadana =

Indian Singer and songwriter

- Birth name: Shivam Singh Sadana
- Born: July 15, 1992 (age 33); Uttarakhand, India
- Genres: Pop: Hip hop
- Occupations: Singer; songwriter; Rapper; Composer; Producer
- Years active: 2019–present

Shivam Sadana (born 15 July 1992) is an Indian Punjabi/Hindi singer, rapper and songwriter from Uttarakhand associated with the Punjabi music industry. Known for his Punjabi songs like 'Paave Gucci', 'Kaint Teri nazran' and 'Soniye kyun'.

== Education and career ==
Shivam Sadana was born in 1992 in Haridwar. He has done his schooling from the Indian Public School Dehradun. Later he completed BBA from Amity University, Noida.

Sadana started his career as a Youtube singer. He released his first song "Aa bhi jana" in 2019 and began to become more well-known following the publication of his song "Tu Mila"

== Discography ==
- Chal Humsafar
- Paave Gucci
- Tu Mila
- Love Struggle
- Shehenshah
- Kaint Teri Nazran
- Soniye Kyun
