= Archana Sardana =

Female skydiver, scuba diver, mountaineer and India's first BASE jumper

Archana Sardana is India's first female BASE jumper. She is a certified skydiver and was the first person to skydive with the Indian flag in the United States of America. Sardana has done 335 skydives and 45 BASE jumps across the globe. She is also the first Indian to BASE Jump off of the KL Tower, Malaysia with the Indian Flag.

Sardana was born in Jammu and did her schooling in Srinagar. She graduated with a diploma in interior design. Her interest in adventure sport came when she married Commander Rajiv Sardana (an electrical officer of the Indian Navy). After discovering her love for adventure sports, Sardana completed 'Adventure and Advanced Mountaineering' courses from the Himalayan Mountaineering Institute, Darjeeling and Nehru Institute of Mountaineering. She has a ‘C’ licence in skydiving from the United States Parachute Association having completed 335 skydives. She is founder of the ‘Archana Sardana Scuba Diving Academy’.

Padma Shri awardees Rachel Thomas, Shital Mahajan, the country's first female base jumper Archana Sardana, Gujarat's First woman skydiver Shweta Parmar are the only four licensed woman skydivers in the country.
