= Gurjot S. Kaler =

Indian police officer, author, writer and singer

- Born: Gurjot Singh Kaler; Mohali, Punjab, India
- Citizenship: Indian
- Education: Panjab University, Chandigarh; University of Bristol
- Occupations: Police officer, author, writer, singer
- Employer: Government of Punjab, India
- Notable work: New India- The Reality Reloaded (2018); The Battle of Longewala: Grit, Guts & Glory (2023)
- Police career
- Country: (India)
- Department: Punjab Police
- Service years: 2012−present
- Rank: Superintendent of Police

Gurjot Singh Kaler is an Indian police officer, author, and singer who serves as a Superintendent of Police in the Punjab Police. He has been associated with cybercrime investigations, community awareness campaigns, and mountaineering.

He is the author of New India - The Reality Reloaded (2018) and The Battle of Longewala: Grit, Guts & Glory (2023).

Kaler has released songs addressing social issues, including My Hero Farmer, Dil Se Salaam, and Bandeya, released by Times Music.

== Early life and education ==
Kaler was born and brought up in Chandigarh, India. He holds a master's degree in Psychology and a master's in Police Administration from Panjab University, Chandigarh.

He is a Commonwealth Scholar and earned a master's degree in International Development and Security from the University of Bristol, United Kingdom.He also pursued short-term training in organisational leadership and emotional intelligence at the University of Oxford.

== Career ==
Kaler joined the Punjab Police after clearing the Punjab Civil Services Examination in 2012. He has served in the intelligence and cybercrime divisions of the force. He has trained with international law-enforcement agencies including the Royal Canadian Mounted Police, the Singapore Police Force, the Federal Bureau of Investigation, and the UK College of Policing.

== Social work and other activities ==
In June 2020, Kaler conducted a peaceful march along with other Indians at Trafalgar Square in London, calling for the removal of the statues of Henry Havelock and Robert Clive and raising his voice against racial discrimination. He also performed a 15,000-foot skydive in September 2020 to salute frontline workers during the COVID-19 pandemic. He has also created awareness works on drug abuse prevention, gender equality, and community welfare.

Along with his police service, Kaler has pursued an interest in mountaineering and adventure sports. He completed training at the Nehru Institute of Mountaineering (NIM), Uttarkashi, and the Atal Bihari Vajpayee Institute of Mountaineering and Allied Sports (ABVIMAS), Manali.

He has climbed several peaks, including Mount Kilimanjaro in Tanzania, Mount Elbrus in Russia, and Mount Shinkun East in India. In May 2019, he climbed the Hurro Mountain of the Machaadhar range in the Himalayas at a height of 14,500 ft.

== Awards and honours ==
Kaler has received several awards and recognitions, including:

Year	Award / Honour	Presented by	Description	Reference
	Director General of Police (DGP) Commendation Discs	Punjab Police	Awarded thrice by the Punjab Police for meritorious service.	
2023	Chief Minister’s Medal for Outstanding Devotion to Duty	Punjab Government	Awarded on the eve of Republic Day 2023 at Bathinda, Punjab.	
2023	India–UK Outstanding Achievers Award	National Indian Students and Alumni Union UK	For contribution towards promoting India–UK professional and cultural ties.	
