= National Institute of Mountaineering and Adventure Sports =

Government institute in India

Coordinates: 27.370°N 92.231°E

- Parent institution: Ministry of Defence
- Established: 30 May 2013; 13 years ago
- Focus: Adventure sports
- President: Defence Minister of India, (Rajnath Singh)
- Owner: Government of India
- Location: Dirang, Arunachal Pradesh, India
- Website: nimasdirang.com

National Institute of Mountaineering and Adventure Sports (NIMAS) is an adventure training institute located in Dirang, Arunachal Pradesh, India. Established in 2013, under the Ministry of Defence, Government of India, NIMAS is the first institution in the country that offers land, air, and water-based adventure training. It provides certified courses in mountaineering, mountain biking, scuba diving, whitewater rafting, paragliding, and paramotoring.

== History ==
The institute was established on 30 May 2013. Col Sarfraz Singh of 6 PARA SF was the first director of NIMAS.

== Courses ==
The institute offers variety of mountaineering, aero and water related courses.

- Basic Mountaineering Course
- Advance Mountaineering Course
- Method of Instruction Course
- Search & Rescue Course
- Basic MTB course
- Advance MTB Course
- Mountain Guide Course
- Special Land Adventure Courses
- Special Aqua Adventure Courses
- Basic & Intermediate White Water Rafting Course
- Basic & Advance Para Gliding Course
- Basic & Intermediate Para Motor Course
- Mountaineering Expedition course
- Rafting Expedition course

== See also ==
- Mountaineering in India
- Indian Mountaineering Foundation
