= Ashish Mane =

Indian mountaineer

Personal information
- Nationality: India
- Born: 14 August 1990 (age 36) Satara, Maharashtra, India
- Education: Raje Shivraya Pratishthan College; Nehru Institute of Mountaineering
- Occupation: Mountaineer

Climbing career
- Known for: Mount Everest Summit

Ashish Mane (born 14 August 1990) is an Indian mountaineer. He has scaled Mount Everest (2012), Lhotse (2013), Makalu (2014), Manaslu (2017), and Kanchenjunga (2019). Ashish is the only climber from Maharashtra as of now, to ascend five of the fourteen eight-thousander peaks over 8,000 meters (26,250 ft) above sea level. In 2016, he attempted to climb Dhaulagiri, but due to technical reasons he had to quit the expedition. He has done all his mountaineering expeditions from Giripremi mountaineering club, Pune.

== Background ==
Ashish hails from Satara, Maharashtra. He is an alumnus of Raje Shivraya Pratishthan college in Kothrud, Pune. He holds a master's degree in Computer Science. He did his basic mountaineering course from Nehru Institute of Mountaineering (NIM) at Uttarkashi. He has done multiple treks in Sahyadri ghats.

His fascination towards mountains and trekking in Konkan region, inspired him to climb in Himalayas.

== Expeditions ==
Year	Peak (Height in meters)
2012	Mount Everest (8,848)
2013	Lhotse (8,516)
2014	Makalu (8,481)
2017	Manaslu (8,163)
2019	Kanchenjunga (8,586)

== Awards ==
Ashish has received following awards

- Shiv Chhatrapati State Sports award for year 2014-15

== See also ==
- Indian summiters of Mount Everest - Year wise
- List of Mount Everest summiters by number of times to the summit
- List of Mount Everest records of India
- List of Mount Everest records
