= Nehru Institute of Mountaineering =

- Uttarkashi, Uttarakhand; India

Information
- Founded: 14 November 1965
- Principal
- Sports: Mountaineering

The Nehru Institute of Mountaineering (NIM India) in Uttarkashi in Uttarakhand is an institute that was established on November 14, 1965. The institute was formed to honor the great desire of Jawahar Lal Nehru, the first Prime Minister of India.

== History ==
Nehru Institute of Mountaineering was first proposed by the Ministry of Defence, the Government of India, and the Government of Uttar Pradesh in 1964. The institute is located in Uttarkashi because it is close to the Gangotri region in Western Garhwal, which offers excellent climbing and training potential in India.

In August 2022, the institute hosted the national sports climbing championship.

== October 2022 DKD2 Avalanche ==
On the morning of 4 October 2022, a team of 41 climbers from Nehru Institute of Mountaineering attempting Draupadi Ka Danda II were hit by an avalanche a few hundred meters below the summit. The team consisted of 34 advanced mountaineering course trainees and seven instructors. The bodies of 27 climbers were recovered during rescue operations, while two mountaineers could not be found.

== Notable alumni ==
- Bachendri Pal
- Santosh Yadav
- Arunima Sinha
- Divyanka Tripathi
- Gurjot S. Kaler

== See also ==
- Himalayan Mountaineering Institute
- Indian Institute of Skiing and Mountaineering
- Jawahar Institute of Mountaineering and Winter Sports
