= Himalayan Mountaineering Institute =

Location
- Jawahar Parbat, Darjeeling, West Bengal 734101; Darjeeling, West Bengal; India

Information
- Motto: May (YOU) Climb from Peak to Peak
- Founded: 4 November 1954; 71 years ago
- Founder: Jawaharlal Nehru, Tenzing Norgay
- Principal: Gp Capt Jai Kishan
- Enrolment: 45,000
- Sports: Mountaineering

The Himalayan Mountaineering Institute (HMI Darjeeling) was established in Darjeeling, India on 4 November 1954 to encourage mountaineering as an organized sport in India.

== History ==
The first ascent of Mount Everest in 1953 by Tenzing Norgay and Edmund Hillary sparked a keen interest in establishing mountaineering as a well-respected endeavor for people in the region. With the impetus provided by the first prime minister of India, Jawaharlal Nehru, HMI was established in Darjeeling. Narendra Dhar Jayal, the pioneer of Indian Mountaineering, was the founding principal of the institute. Tenzing Norgay was the first director of field training for HMI. The buildings for the Institute were designed by the architect Joseph Allen Stein, who then taught at the Bengal Engineering College near Calcutta. It was the first building in a career in India that lasted half a century.

HMI regularly conducts Adventure, Basic, and Advanced Mountaineering courses. These are very comprehensive courses. They are also highly subsidised to encourage mountaineering as a sport.

Tenzing Norgay became the first Director of Field Training of the Himalayan Mountaineering Institute in Darjeeling, when it was set up in 1954.

== Gallery ==
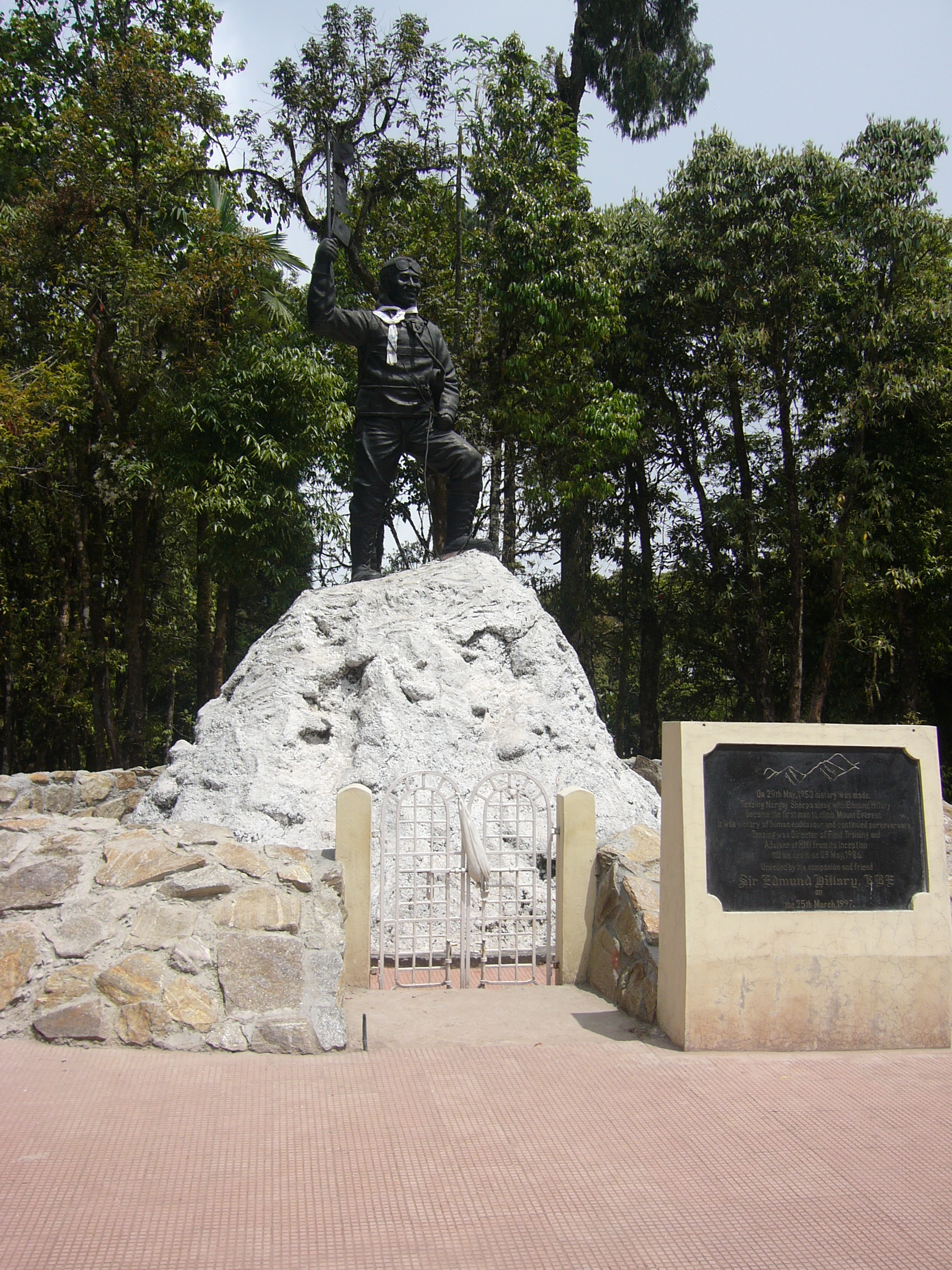
Tenzing Memorial

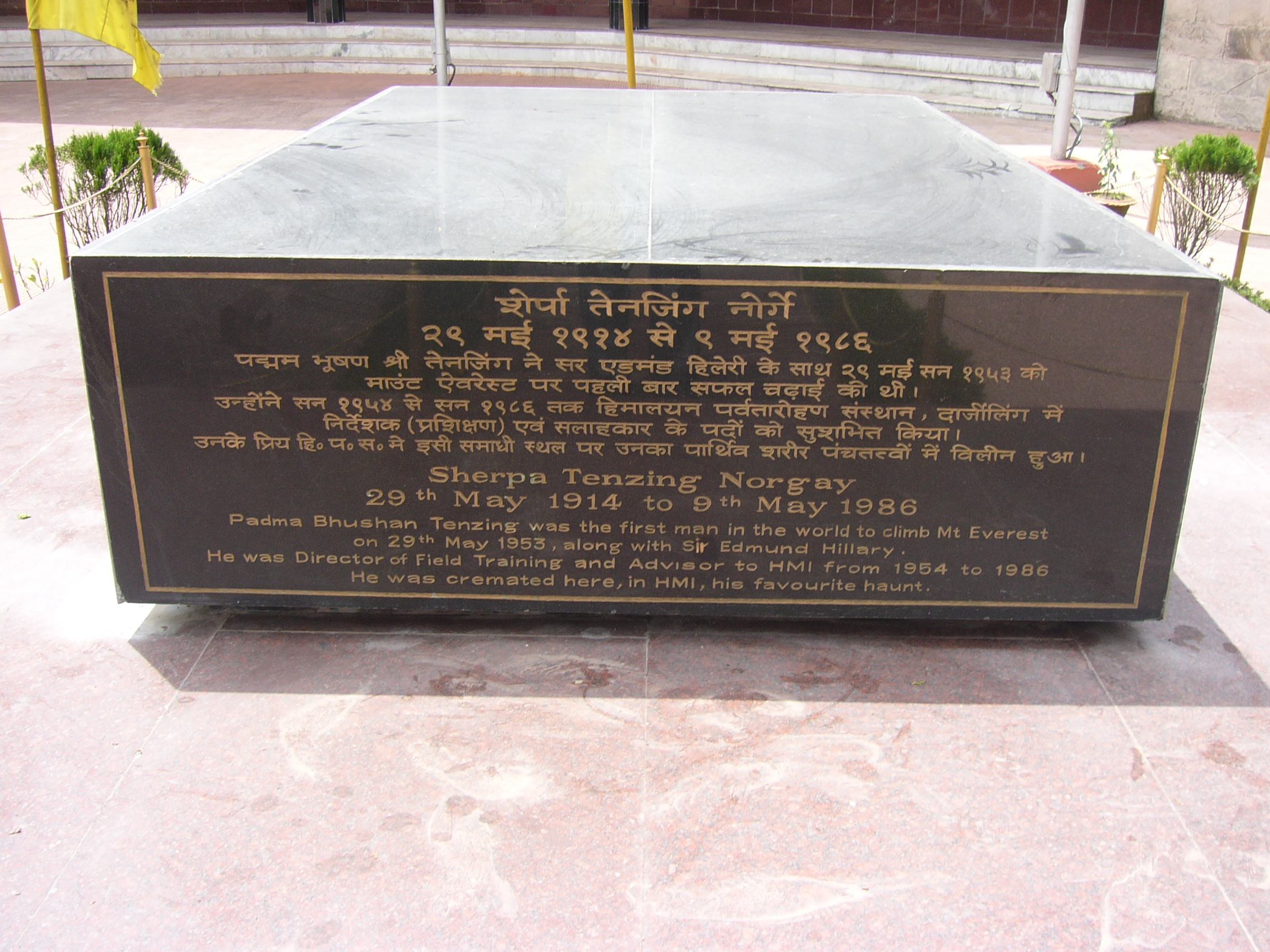
Tenzing Memorial

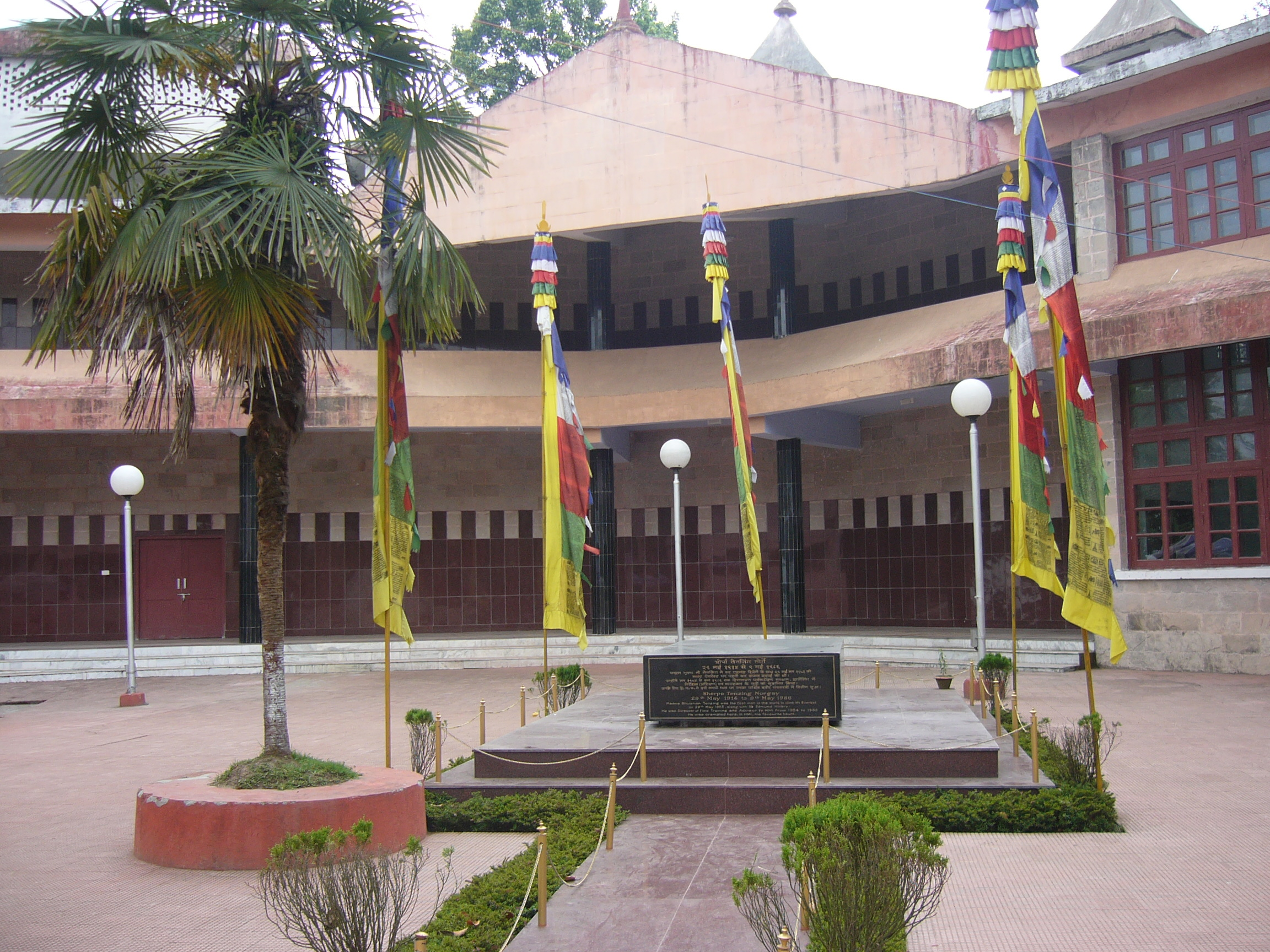
Tenzing Memorial

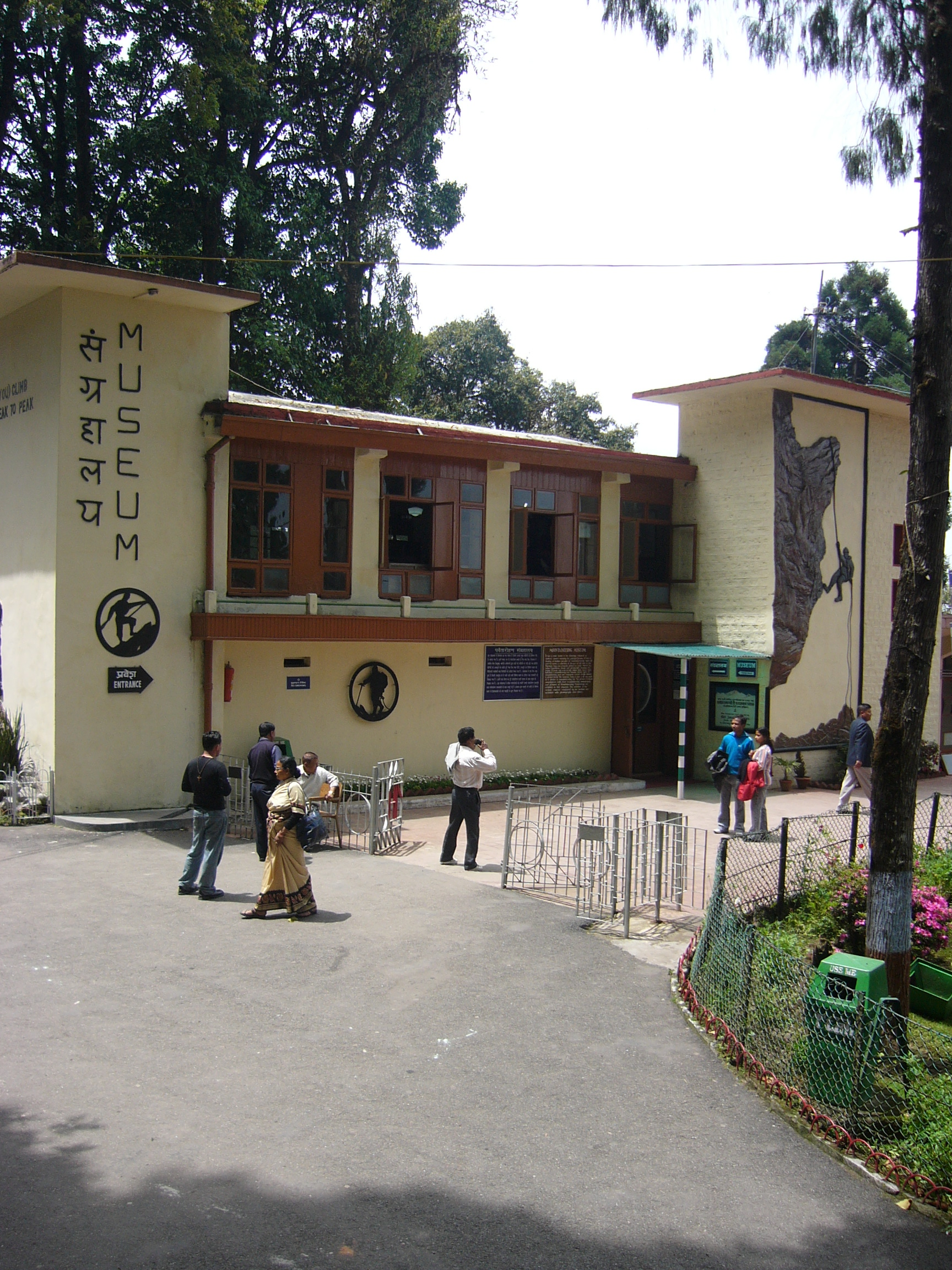
Museum

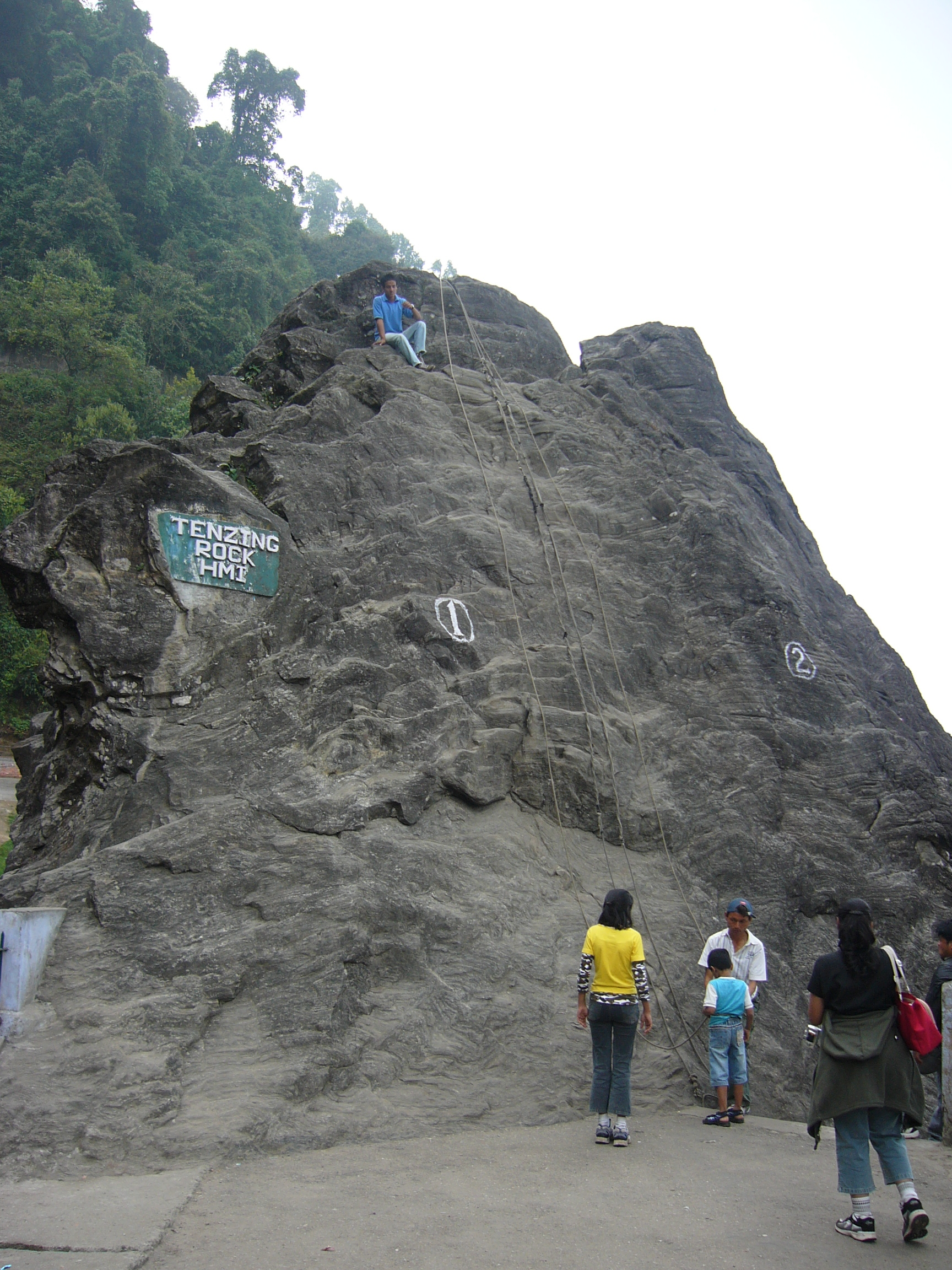
Tenzing Rock

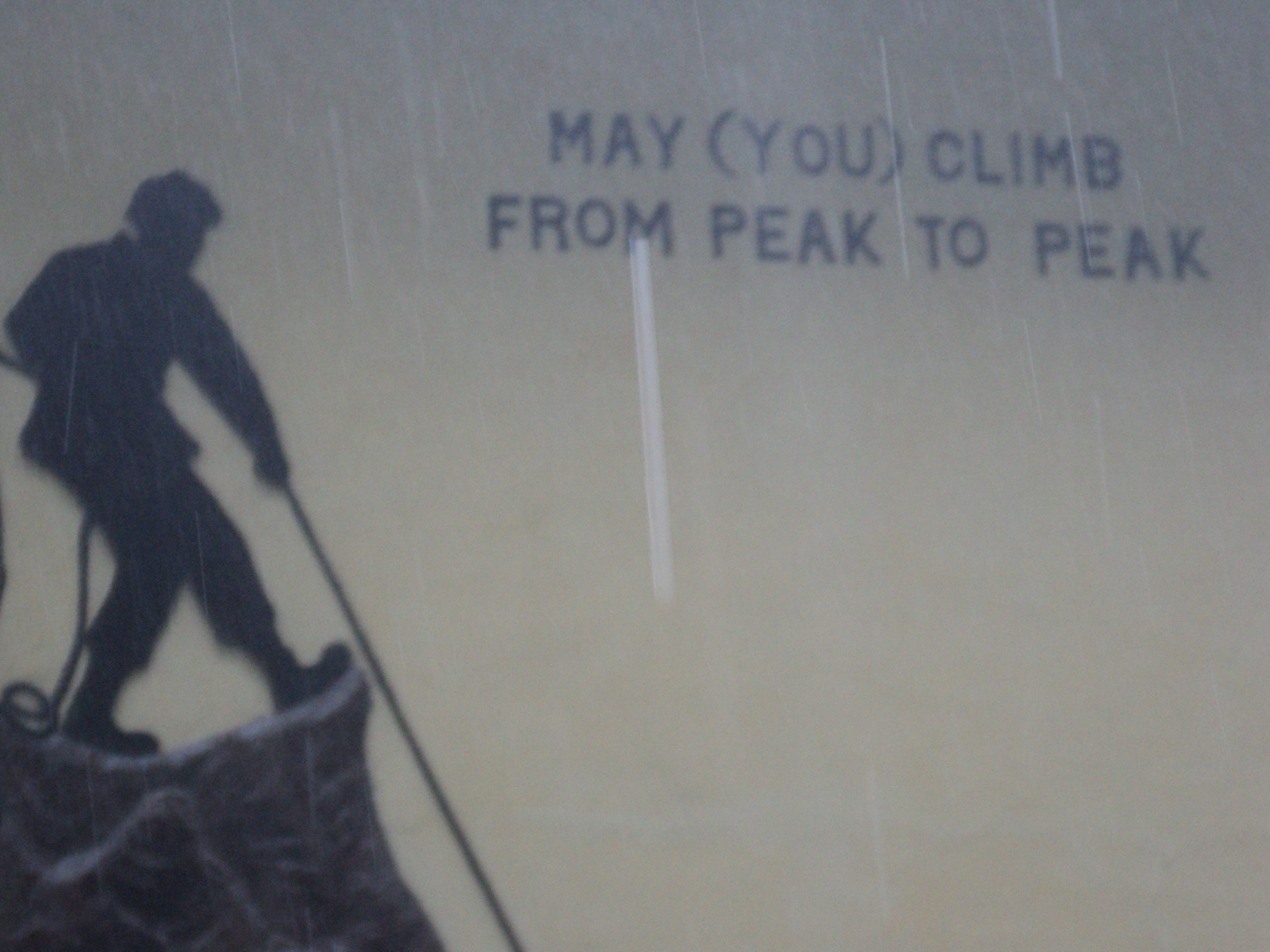
May (You) Climb From Peak To Peak

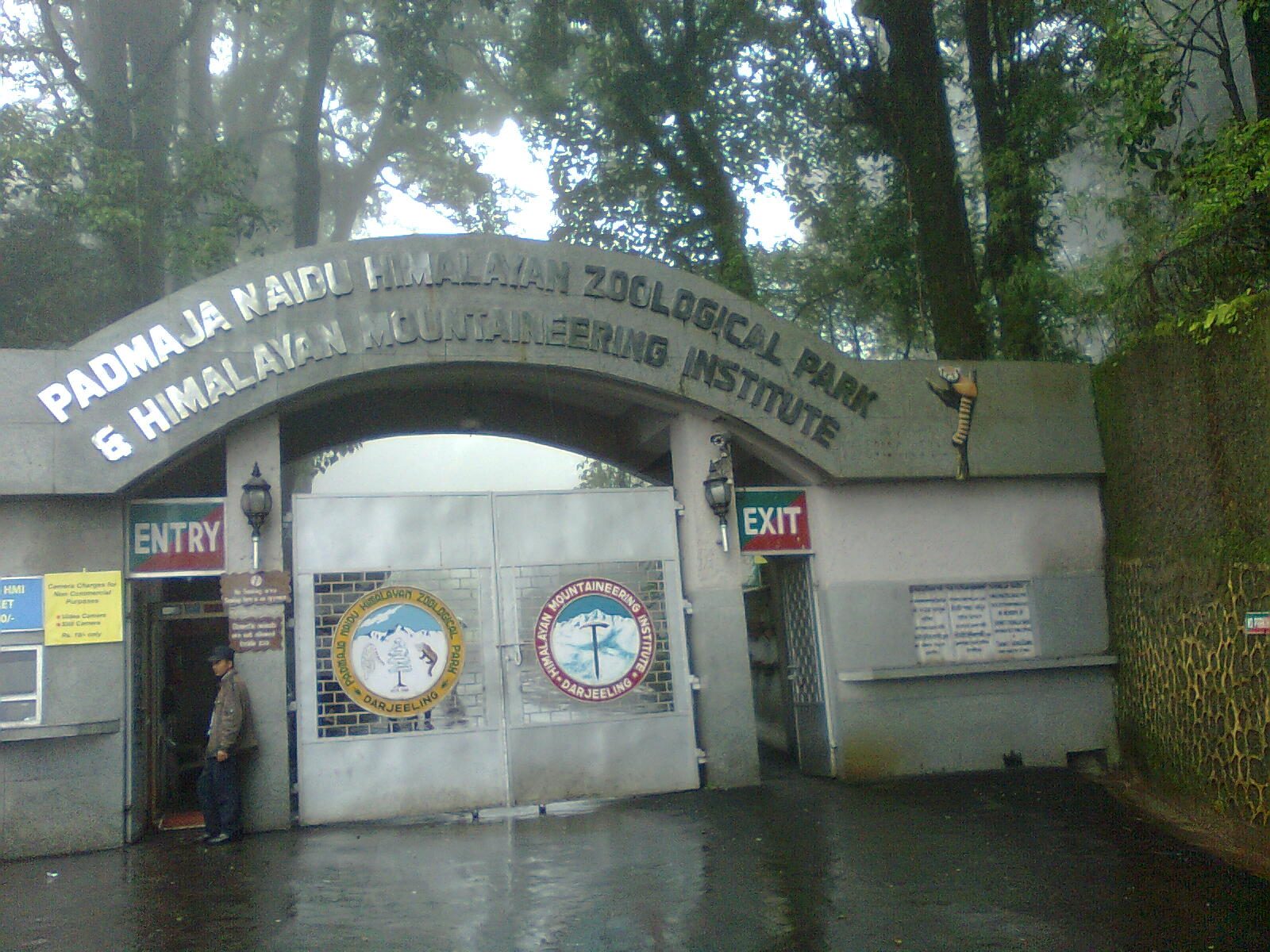
Himalayan Mountaineering Institute, Darjeeling

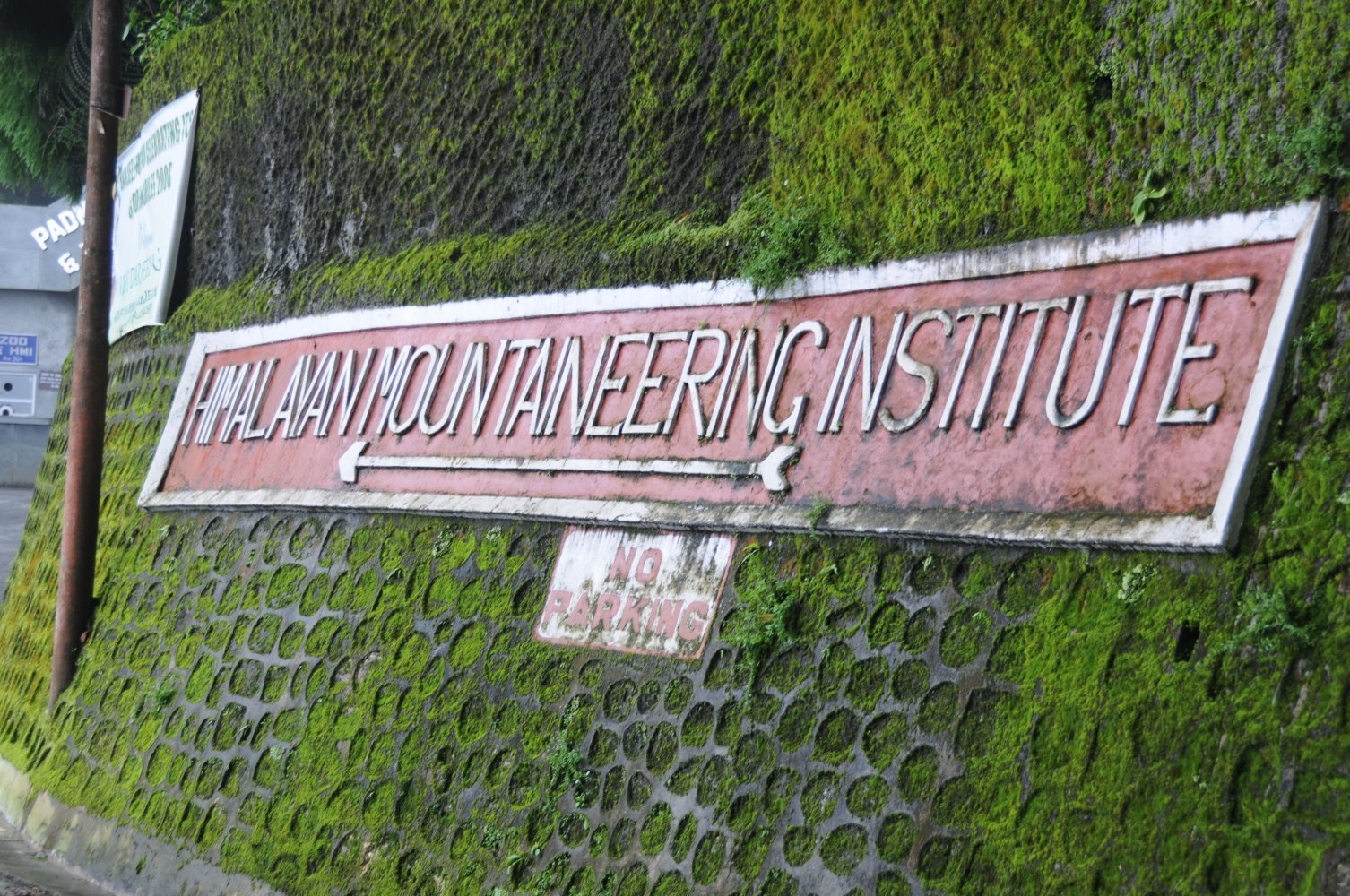
Signage near Himalayan Mountaineering Institute, Darjeeling, India.

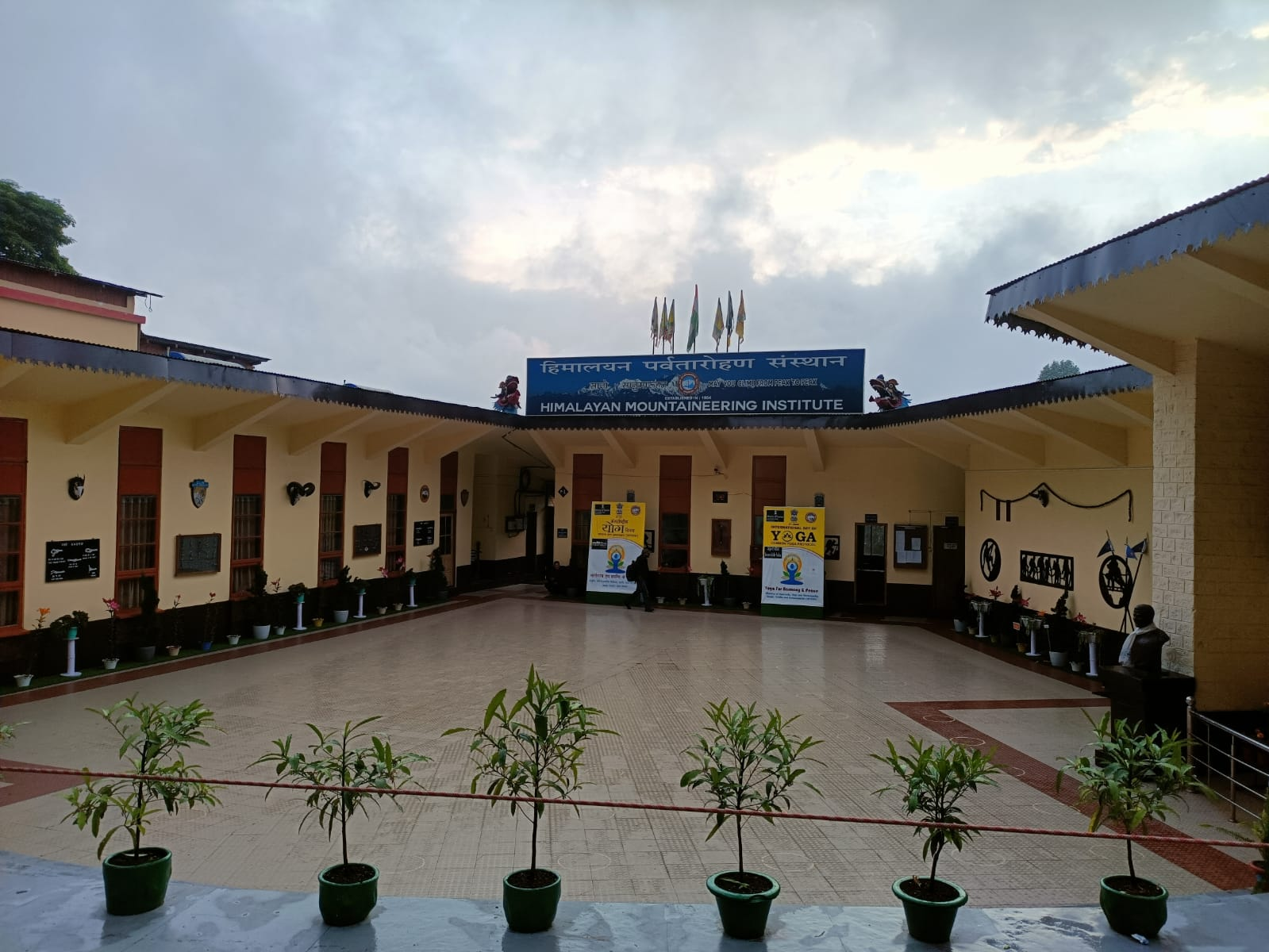
Main Building in HMI, Darjeeling

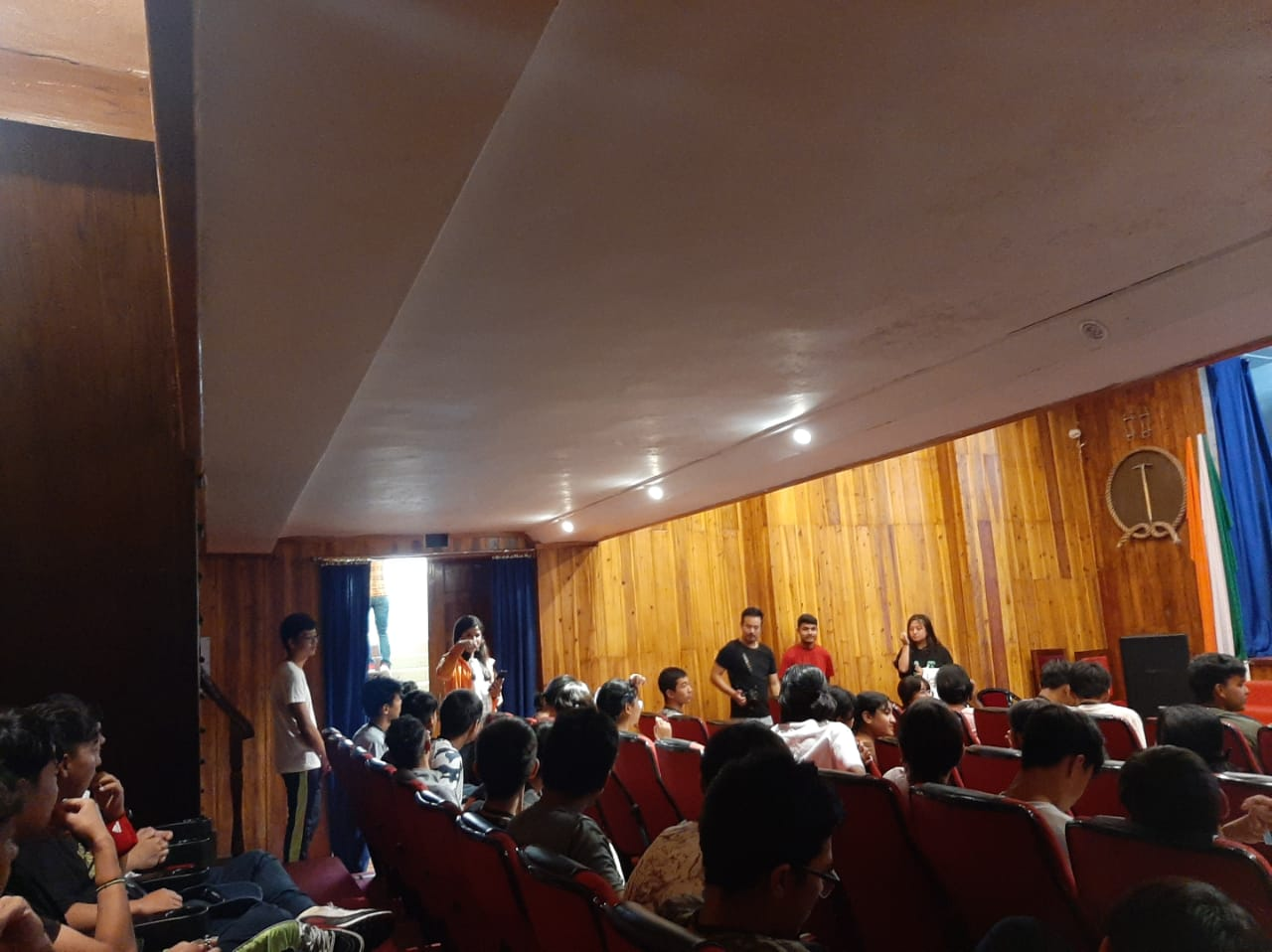
Hall for events in HMI

== Alumni ==
- Col Narendra Kumar
- Archana Sardana
- Malavath Purna
- Harshvardhan Joshi
- Satyarup Siddhanta

== See also ==
- Poorna: Hindi language biographical adventure film.
