= List of Tenzing Norgay National Adventure Award recipients =

Tenzing Norgay National Adventure Award
- Civilian award for achievements in the field of adventure
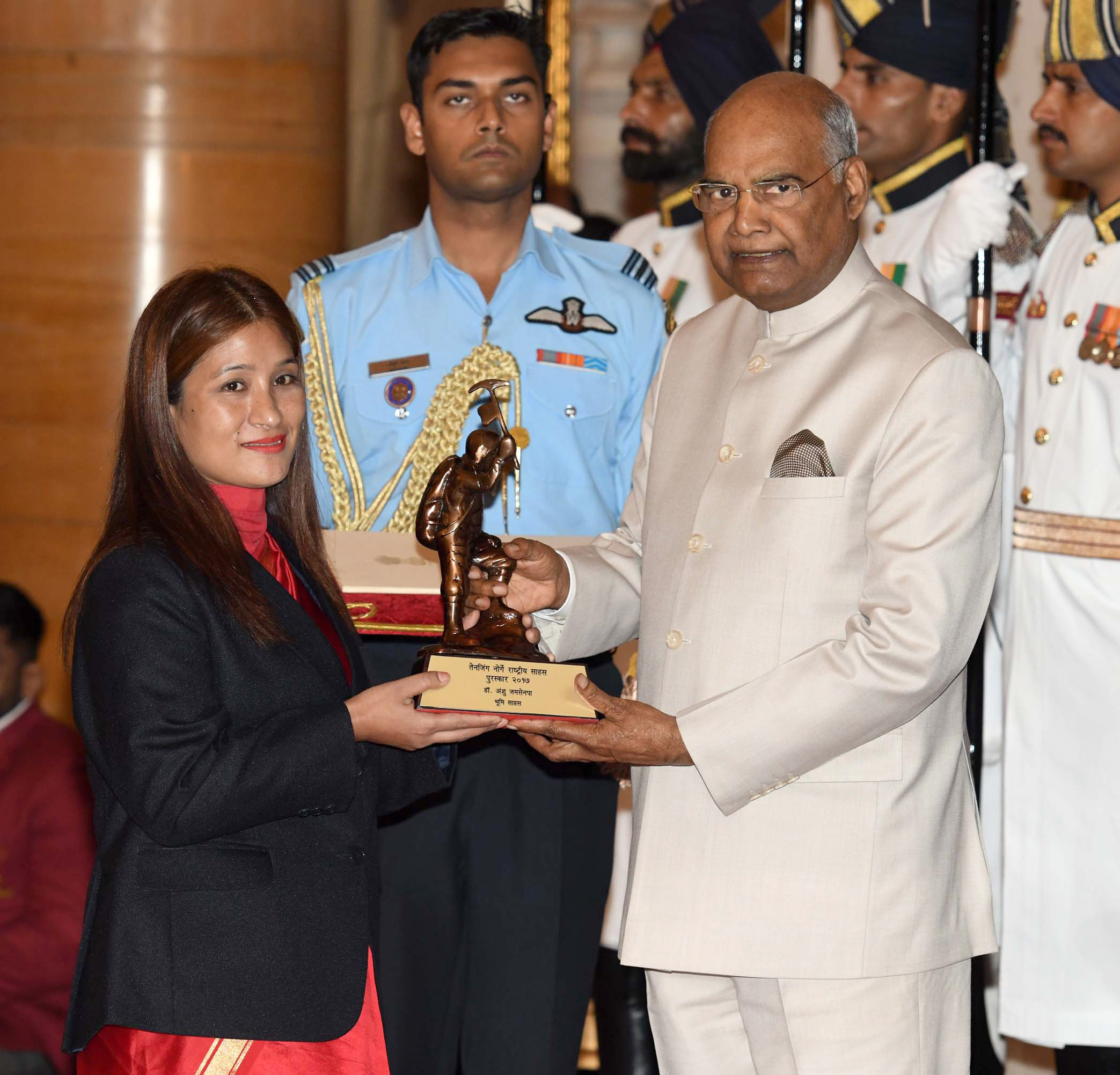
- Anshu Jamsenpa receiving the award for the year 2017 for land adventure
- Awarded for: Highest adventure honour in India
- Sponsored by: Government of India
- Reward: ₹5 lakh (US$5,300)
- First award: 1994
- Final award: 2021

Highlights
- Total awarded: 146

Precedence
- Equivalent: Arjuna Award

The Tenzing Norgay National Adventure Award, formerly known as National Adventure Awards, is the highest adventure sports honour of Republic of India. The award is named after Tenzing Norgay, a Nepali-Indian Sherpa mountaineer and one of the first two individuals to reach the summit of Mount Everest along with Edmund Hillary in 1953. It is awarded annually by the Ministry of Youth Affairs and Sports. The recipients are honoured for their "outstanding achievement in the field of adventure activities on land, sea and air" over the previous three years. The lifetime achievement is awarded to individuals who have demonstrated excellence in and devoted themselves in the promotion of adventure sports. As of 2021, the award comprises "a bronze statuette of Tenzing Norgay along with a cash prize of ₹15 lakh (US$16,000)". (Note: The cash prize started with ₹50,000 (US$530) in 1994, was revised to ₹1.5 lakh (US$1,600) in 1999, to ₹3 lakh (US$3,200) in 2002, to ₹5 lakh (US$5,300) in 2008, and to ₹15 lakh (US$16,000) in 2021)

Instituted in 1993–1994, the first awards were given for the year 1994. The stature of this award is considered to be equivalent to Arjuna Award conferred in the field of sport. Since the year 2004, this award, along with all the other six National Sports Awards, are conferred in the same presidential ceremony at the Presidential Palace, usually on 29 August each year. The nominations for a given year are accepted until 20 June. Typically, one award in each of the four categories—Land adventure, Water (Sea) adventure, Air adventure, and Lifetime achievement—are given. The number may increase in a particular year for appropriate reasons and after approval. A five-member committee evaluates the achievements of a candidate in a particular category of adventure, taking into consideration their last three years of performance for the first three categories. The committee later submits its recommendations to the Union Minister of Youth Affairs and Sports for further approval.

As of 2021, there have been 146 recipients. In the first year 1994, 22 awards were given, of which 19 were bestowed on the Indian members of the 1993 Indo-Nepalese Women's Everest Expedition. In 2017, ten awards were given, of which six were given to the members of Navika Sagar Parikrama, an all-woman sailing team for the circumnavigation of the globe. Chandraprabha Aitwal is the only double recipient of the award, in 1994 for land adventure and in 2009 for lifetime achievement.

== List of recipients ==
Award recipients by year
Year	Number of recipients
1994–1999	45
2000–2009	38
2010–2019	56
2020–2021	7

Award recipients by gender (Note: The names and complete data of four award recipients is missing, two recipients from 1997 and two from 1998. The partial data for three recipients is missing, Lalneihsenga (1996) – discipline missing, Ratnamani Roy (1999) – gender, category and discipline missing and Chalti Debarma (2000) – gender, category and discipline missing. Hence the total in the graphs may not match the total number of recipients.)
Gender	Number of recipients
Male	93
Female	47

Award recipients by category
Category	Number of recipients
Land Adventure	67
Water Adventure	27
Air Adventure	18
Lifetime Achievement	28

Award recipients by discipline
Category	Number of recipients
Mountaineering	87
Open water swimming	15
Sailing	12
Skydiving	17
Others (Note: Includes caving (1 recipient), cross-country skiing (1 recipient), hang gliding (2 recipients), microlight aviation (2 recipients) and white water rafting (1 recipient))	7

Key
# Indicates a posthumous honour

List of award recipients, showing the year, gender, category and discipline
Year	Recipient	Gender	Category	Discipline	Refs.
1994	Chandraprabha Aitwal	Female	Land Adventure	Mountaineering	
1994	Kunga Bhatia	Female	Land Adventure	Mountaineering	
1994	Gurmayum Anita Devi	Female	Land Adventure	Mountaineering	
1994	Radha Devi	Female	Land Adventure	Mountaineering	
1994	Dicky Dolma	Female	Land Adventure	Mountaineering	
1994	Baldev Kanwar	Male	Land Adventure	Mountaineering	
1994	Suman Kutiyal	Female	Land Adventure	Mountaineering	
1994	Savita Martolia	Female	Land Adventure	Mountaineering	
1994	Rita G Marwah	Female	Land Adventure	Mountaineering	
1994	Bimla Negi	Female	Land Adventure	Mountaineering	
1994	Sarla Negi	Female	Land Adventure	Mountaineering	
1994	Nima Norbu	Male	Land Adventure	Mountaineering	
1994	Bachendri Pal	Female	Land Adventure	Mountaineering	
1994	Harshha Panwar	Female	Land Adventure	Mountaineering	
1994	Rita Patel	Female	Land Adventure	Mountaineering	
1994	K. Saraswati	Female	Land Adventure	Mountaineering	
1994	Deepu Sharma	Female	Land Adventure	Mountaineering	
1994	Rajeev Sharma	Male	Land Adventure	Mountaineering	
1994	A. K. Singh	Male	Water Adventure	Sailing	
1994	Hukum Singh	Male	Lifetime Achievement	Mountaineering	
1994	Rachel Thomas	Female	Air Adventure	Skydiving	
1994	Santosh Yadav	Female	Land Adventure	Mountaineering	
1995	C N Janaki	Female	Water Adventure	Open water swimming	
1995	H C Kohli	Male	Land Adventure	Mountaineering	
1995	Chhavi Madan	Female	Water Adventure	Open water swimming	
1995	Baba Maninder Paul	Male	Land Adventure	Mountaineering	
1995	Sanjay Thapar	Male	Air Adventure	Skydiving	
1995	Ang Tsering	Male	Lifetime Achievement	Mountaineering	
1995	M P Yadav	Male	Land Adventure	Mountaineering	
1996	B. K. Das	Male	Air Adventure	Microlight aviation	
1996	Krishan Kumar	Male	Land Adventure	Mountaineering	
1996	Gunjan Parulkar	Female	Water Adventure	Open water swimming	
1996	Rupali Repale	Female	Water Adventure	Open water swimming	
1996	Gyan Singh^{#}	Male	Lifetime Achievement	Mountaineering	
1996	Lalneihsenga	Male	Land Adventure		
1997	Kokila Sudha	Female	Land Adventure	Mountaineering	
1998	Amulya Sen	Male	Lifetime Achievement	Mountaineering	
1999	H. S. Chauhan	Male	Lifetime Achievement	Mountaineering	
1999	Love Raj Singh Dharmshaktu	Male	Land Adventure	Mountaineering	
1999	Ratnamani Roy				
1999	S. D. Sharma	Male	Land Adventure	Mountaineering	
2000	Ratan Singh Chauhan	Male	Land Adventure	Mountaineering	
2000	Chalti Debarma				
2000	Kamal Singh Oberh	Male	Air Adventure	Skydiving	
2000	Kushang Sherpa	Male	Land Adventure	Mountaineering	
2001	Kulwant Singh Dhami	Male	Land Adventure	Mountaineering	
2001	Barkha Kishore Kedia	Female	Water Adventure	Open water swimming	
2001	Dorjee Lhatoo	Male	Lifetime Achievement	Mountaineering	
2001	Vijaypat Singhania	Male	Lifetime Achievement	Microlight aviation	
2001	Ramesh Chandra Tripathi	Male	Land Adventure	Mountaineering	
2002	Bula Choudhury	Female	Lifetime Achievement	Open water swimming	
2002	Brian Dermot Kharpran Daly	Male	Land Adventure	Caving	
2002	Relu Ram Thakur	Male	Water Adventure	White water rafting	
2003	Harish Kapadia	Male	Lifetime Achievement	Mountaineering	
2003	Mayur Mehta	Male	Water Adventure	Open water swimming	
2003	Amar Prakash	Male	Land Adventure	Mountaineering	
2004	Mohan Singh Gunjyal	Male	Lifetime Achievement	Mountaineering	
2004	Nadre Sherpa	Male	Land Adventure	Mountaineering	
2004	Jayashankar	Male	Air Adventure	Skydiving	
2005	Mukul Asthana	Male	Water Adventure	Sailing	
2005	Chhering Norbu Bodh	Male	Land Adventure	Mountaineering	
2005	Nawang Gombu	Male	Lifetime Achievement	Mountaineering	
2005	Shital Mahajan	Female	Air Adventure	Skydiving	
2006	Tapas Chowdhury	Male	Water Adventure	Sailing	
2006	Palden Giachho	Male	Land Adventure	Mountaineering	
2006	Motuku Indra Kanth Reddy	Male	Air Adventure	Skydiving	
2006	Gurdial Singh	Male	Lifetime Achievement	Mountaineering	
2007	Neel Chand	Male	Land Adventure	Mountaineering	
2007	Mohan Singh Kohli	Male	Lifetime Achievement	Mountaineering	
2007	T. K. Rath	Male	Air Adventure	Skydiving	
2007	Mohinder Singh	Male	Land Adventure	Mountaineering	
2008	H. P. S. Ahluwalia	Male	Lifetime Achievement	Mountaineering	
2008	Bachinapally Shekhar Babu	Male	Land Adventure	Mountaineering	
2008	Chaitanya Datla	Female	Water Adventure	Sailing	
2008	Ramakant	Male	Air Adventure	Hang gliding	
2009	Chandraprabha Aitwal	Female	Lifetime Achievement	Mountaineering	
2009	HC Kamlesh Kumar Bounthiyal	Male	Land Adventure	Mountaineering	
2009	Jai Kishan	Male	Air Adventure	Skydiving	
2009	Sufyan Sheikh	Male	Water Adventure	Open water swimming	
2010	Reena Kaushal Dharmshaktu	Female	Land Adventure	Cross-country skiing	
2010	Dilip Donde	Male	Water Adventure	Sailing	
2010	Balwant Sandhu^{#}	Male	Lifetime Achievement	Mountaineering	
2010	Mamta Sodha	Female	Land Adventure	Mountaineering	
2011	Rajendra Singh Jalal	Male	Land Adventure	Mountaineering	
2011	Bhakti Sharma	Female	Water Adventure	Open water swimming	
2011	Mandip Singh Soin	Male	Lifetime Achievement	Mountaineering	
2011	Anand Swarup	Male	Land Adventure	Mountaineering	
2012	Ranveer Jamwal	Male	Land Adventure	Mountaineering	
2012	Hari Ram	Male	Lifetime Achievement	Mountaineering	
2012	Basant Singh Roy	Male	Land Adventure	Mountaineering	
2012	Paramjeet Singh Siddhu	Male	Air Adventure	Hang gliding	
2012	Prem Singh	Male	Lifetime Achievement	Mountaineering	
2012	Abhilash Tomy	Male	Water Adventure	Sailing	
2013	Amit Chowdhury	Male	Lifetime Achievement	Skydiving	
2013	Passang Tenzing Sherpa	Male	Land Adventure	Mountaineering	
2013	Jagat Singh	Male	Land Adventure	Mountaineering	
2013	Surender Singh	Male	Air Adventure	Skydiving	
2014	Satish Chander Sharma	Male	Lifetime Achievement	Mountaineering	
2014	Jot Singh	Male	Land Adventure	Mountaineering	
2014	Paramvir Singh	Male	Water Adventure	Open water swimming	
2014	Arunima Sinha	Female	Land Adventure	Mountaineering	
2014	Satyendra Verma	Male	Air Adventure	Skydiving	
2015	Debasish Biswas	Male	Land Adventure	Mountaineering	
2015	Ritu Kishor Kedia	Female	Water Adventure	Open water swimming	
2015	Nungshi Malik	Female	Land Adventure	Mountaineering	
2015	Tashi Malik	Female	Land Adventure	Mountaineering	
2015	B. Rajkumar	Male	Air Adventure	Skydiving	
2015	Harbhajan Singh	Male	Lifetime Achievement	Mountaineering	
2016	Ashok Abbey	Male	Lifetime Achievement	Mountaineering	
2016	Premlata Agrawal	Female	Land Adventure	Mountaineering	
2016	More Rohan Dattatrey	Male	Water Adventure	Open water swimming	
2016	Ved Prakash Sharma	Male	Lifetime Achievement	Skydiving	
2017	Aishwarya Boddapati	Female	Water Adventure	Sailing	
2017	Shougrakpam Vijaya Devi	Female	Water Adventure	Sailing	
2017	Payal Gupta	Female	Water Adventure	Sailing	
2017	Anshu Jamsenpa	Female	Land Adventure	Mountaineering	
2017	Pratibha Jamwal	Female	Water Adventure	Sailing	
2017	Vartika Joshi	Female	Water Adventure	Sailing	
2017	Ravi Kumar^{#}	Male	Land Adventure	Mountaineering	
2017	Patarlapalli Swathi	Female	Water Adventure	Sailing	
2017	Udit Thapar	Male	Air Adventure	Skydiving	
2017	Sonam Wangyal	Male	Lifetime Achievement	Mountaineering	
2018	Dipankar Ghosh^{#}	Male	Land Adventure	Mountaineering	
2018	Rameshwer Jangra	Male	Air Adventure	Skydiving	
2018	Manikandan K.	Male	Land Adventure	Mountaineering	
2018	Prabhat Raju Koli	Male	Water Adventure	Open water swimming	
2018	Aparna Kumar	Female	Land Adventure	Mountaineering	
2018	Wangchuk Sherpa	Male	Lifetime Achievement	Mountaineering	
2019	Magan Bissa^{#}	Male	Lifetime Achievement	Mountaineering	
2019	Anita Devi	Female	Land Adventure	Mountaineering	
2019	Keval Hiren Kakka	Male	Land Adventure	Mountaineering	
2019	Satendra Singh Lohiya	Male	Water Adventure	Open water swimming	
2019	Sarfraz Singh	Male	Land Adventure	Mountaineering	
2019	Taka Tamut	Male	Land Adventure	Mountaineering	
2019	Gajanand Yadava	Male	Air Adventure	Skydiving	
2020	Sheetal	Female	Land Adventure	Mountaineering	
2020	Priyanka Mohite	Female	Land Adventure	Mountaineering	
2020	Srikaanth Viswanathan	Male	Water Adventure	Swimming	
2020	Amit Bisht	Male	Land Adventure	Mountaineering	
2020	Servesh Dhadwal	Male	Air Adventure	Skydiving	
2021	Naina Dhakad	Female	Land Adventure	Mountaineering	
2021	Shubham Dhananjay Vanmali	Male	Water Adventure	Open water swimming	
2021	Bhawani Singh Samyal	Male	Life Time Achievement		
2025	Uday Kumar (mountaineer) Kumar	Male	mountaineer	mountaineer	
