= Uday Kumar =

Uday Kumar or Udaykumar may refer to:

- Uday Kumar (mountaineer) (born 1988), Indian mountaineer and para-athlete
- Uday Kumar Abhay (born 1983), Indian cricketer
- Uday Kumar Singh, Indian politician from Bihar
- Udaykumar (1933–1985), Indian film actor and producer

== See also ==
- Udayakumar
