= Dipankar Ghosh (mountaineer) =

Indian mountaineer

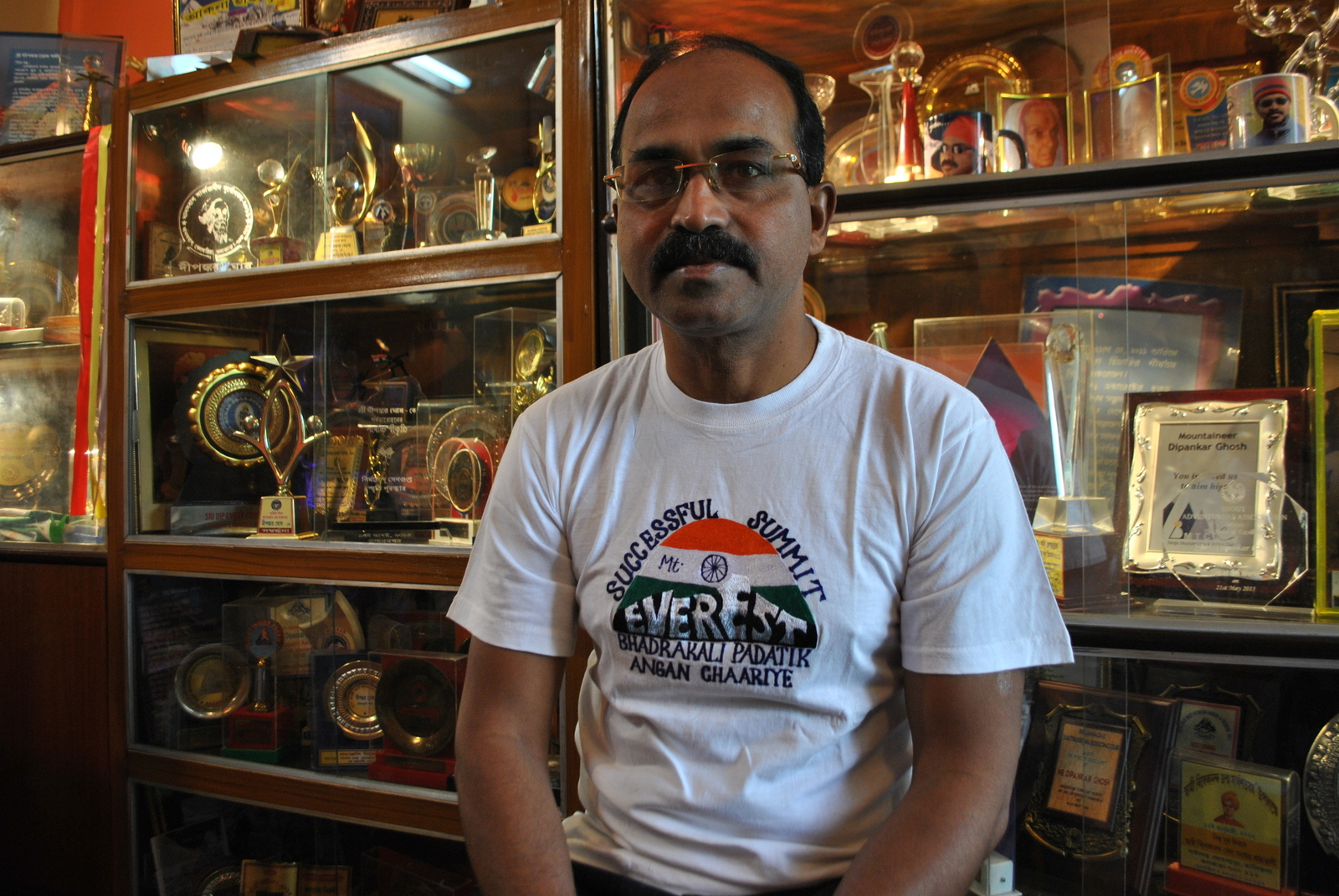

Personal information
- Full name: Dipankar Ghosh
- Born: West Bengal, India
- Died: May 2019 Makalu, Nepal

Climbing career
- Major ascents: Mount Everest, Lhotse, Kangchenjunga, Mount Dhaulagiri, Mount Cho Oyu, Makalu

Dipankar Ghosh was an Indian mountaineer from West Bengal. He is the first Bengali to climb Mount Everest and had successfully climbed five other eight-thousand-meter peaks besides Mount Everest. In 2019, the Government of India posthumously honored him with the Tenzing Norgay Adventure Award for the year 2018, the highest adventure sports honor in India. He died in 2019.

== Early life and education ==
Dipankar Ghosh was born in Belanagar, Howrah. He enrolled in Sabujsathi Primary School in the Uttarpara area of Hooghly. Later, he passed secondary school in 1981 from Raghunathpur Nafar Academy School and graduated from Uttarpara Amarendra Vidyapith. He completed his higher secondary education at Bali Jora Ashwatala School in 1983. Subsequently, he graduated in Science from Vidyasagar College of Calcutta University in 1985.

He received mountaineering training from the Atal Bihari Vajpayee Institute of Mountaineering and Allied Sports, Manali; Jawahar Institute of Mountaineering and Winter Sports, Jammu & Kashmir; Himalayan Mountaineering Institute, Darjeeling; and Nehru Institute of Mountaineering, Uttarkashi.

== Career ==
He worked as a computer accessories salesman. Ghosh received support from the west Government of West Bengal and corporate sponsors. He successfully summited Mount Everest in 2011. He conquered Kangchenjunga (2014), and Dhaulagiri (2017). In 2018, he successfully summited Cho Oyu, the world's sixth-highest peak on the China-Nepal border, 20 kilometers west of Mount Everest.

== Death ==
In May 2019, Dipankar Ghosh went missing during his descent from Makalu in Nepal. His mortal remains were discovered by the rescue team after 8 days of his being missing.

== Awards and recognition ==
In 2019, he was posthumously honored with the Tenzing Norgay National Adventure Award for the year 2018 by the Government of India. He also received the Radhanath Sikdar Tenzing Norgay State Award for State Climbers, awarded by the Government of West Bengal and the Bharat Gaurav Award given by the Chief Minister of Haryana.

== See also ==
- List of deaths on eight-thousanders
- List of Tenzing Norgay National Adventure Award recipients
