= Chauka (song) =

Song by Shankar Mahadevan & Rishiking
- Language: Hindi
- Released: 10 November 2019
- Recorded: 2019
- Genre: Melody
- Length: 2:54
- Label: Ree Musical
- Songwriter(s): Rishiking & Parikipandla Narahari

Music video
- "Chauka" on YouTube

Chauka is an Indore Swachhta Anthem song for the 2019-2020 edition of Swachh Survekshan league 20-20, sung by Shankar Mahadevan & Rishiking composed by Rishiking and conceived by P Narahari IAS. Chauka Song was released by the Indian Television Academy Awards 2019 program in Indore. It became very popular in Indore with residents using the track as their caller tune.

== Summary ==
After the success of Ho Halla, Hai Halla and Hatrick song Rishiking prepared a fourth song for the fourth time Indore come Number One Cleanest City in India song Name is Chauka. The last three songs were gone by Shaan, but the fourth song was sung by Rishiking to Shankar Mahadevan.
