= Satendra Singh Lohiya =

Indian swimmer

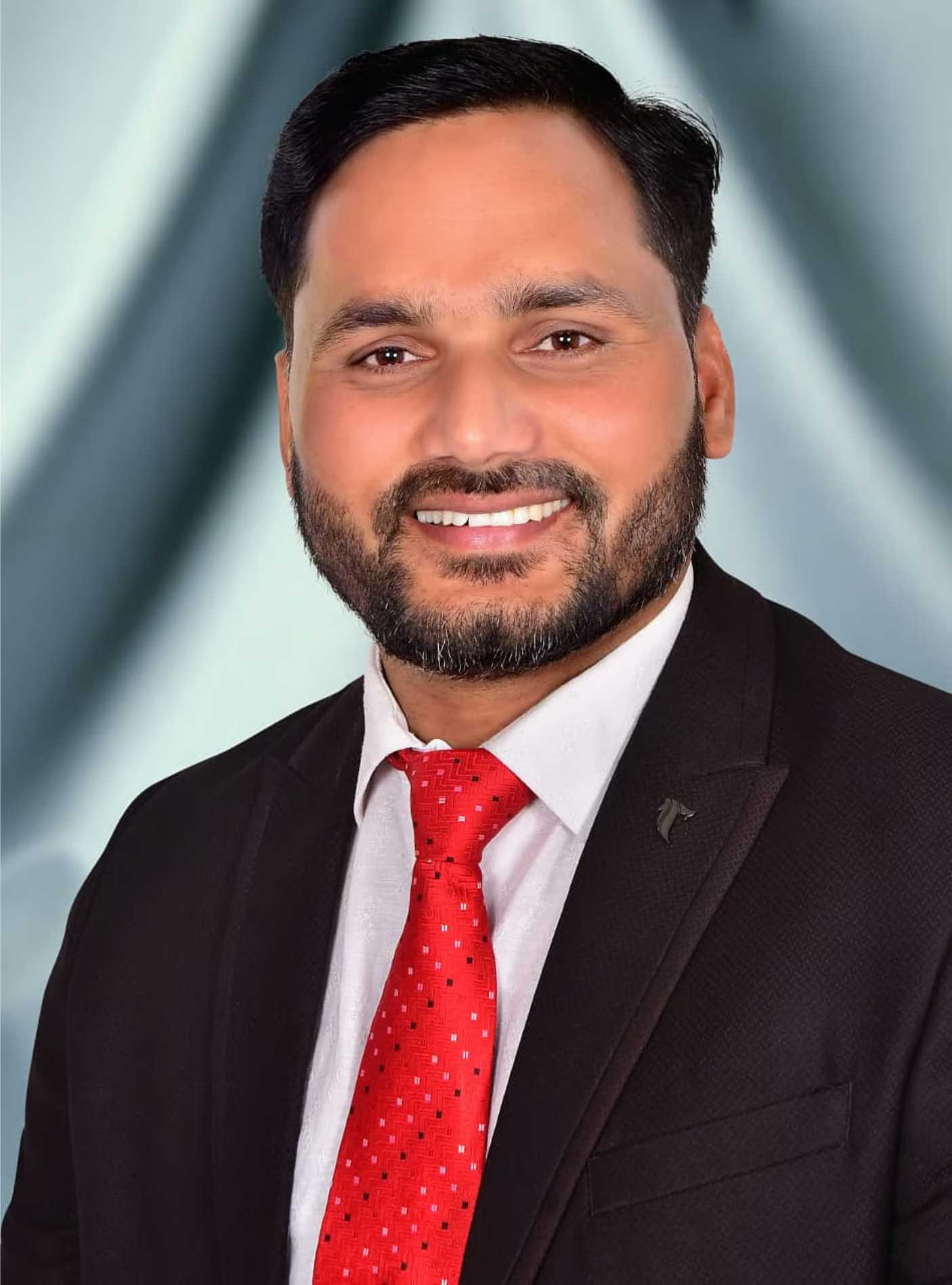

Personal information
- Nationality: India
- Born: 6 July 1987 (age 39) Bhind, Madhya Pradesh, India
- Height: 5 ft 4 in (1.63 m)
- Weight: 154 lb (70 kg)
- Spouse: Minaxi Kataria (m. 2019)

Sport
- Sport: Swimming
- Strokes: Freestyle, Back Stroke, Breast Stroke

Satendra Singh Lohiya (born 6 July 1987) is an Indian swimmer with 70% disability. On 24 June 2018 he crossed the English Channel as part of a swimming relay team which, for the first time saw four para swimmers from India cross the English Channel. He completed the channel in 12 hours and 26 minutes, setting a new record. He has been selected for the Tenzing Norgay Adventure Award 2019 for first Indian para swimmer which was given by the Honorable President of India Ram Nath Kovind and The Prime Minister of India Shri Narendra Modi also recognized and appreciated Satendra Singh Lohiya's hard work and blessed him for his future endeavor on 13 March 2020. He received Vikram Award, the highest state-level sports awards in Madhya Pradesh, for swimming from the Chief Minister Shri Shivraj Singh Chauhan, MP on 23 December 2014. The Government of India honoured him with the Padma Shri for 2024 for his contribution in the field of Sports.

== Swimming career ==
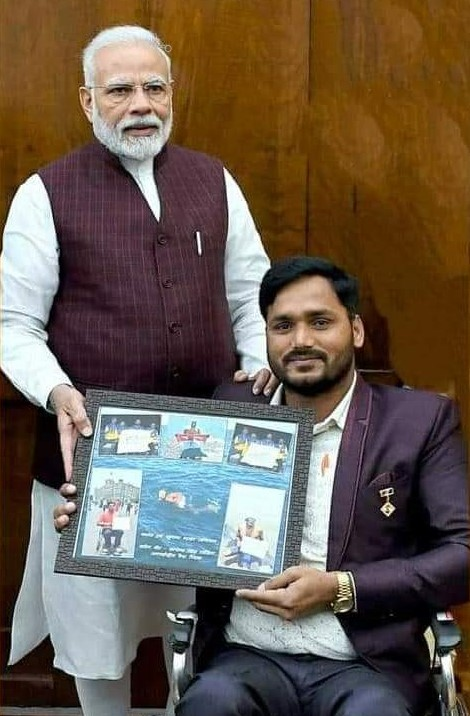
Satendra Singh Lohiya with PM Narenra Modi

2026 English Channel

- On 25 September 2026, Lohiya crossed the English Channel from Dover, England, to France for the third time.

2023 English Channel

- 2023 English Channel swimming 72 KM Two way as part of 6 person para swimming relay team.

XXII National Paralympic Swimming Championship, 11–13 November 2022 Guwahati Assam

- 1 Gold & 1 Silver

North Channel Swimming (36 km.)

- As Part of 06 Person Relay Swimming Team. Northern Ireland UK

2022 XXI National Paralympic Swimming Championship 2022 Udaipur

- 2 Silver

2019 Ctalina Channel

- 2019 Ctalina Channel Indian Para Relay Team including successfully crossed the Catalina Channel with the timing of 11 hours 34 minutes today also set up Asian record.

2018 English Channel

- 2018 English Channel swimming as part of 4 person para swimming relay team.

XVI National Paralympic Swimming Championship Jaipur

- 2 Gold, 1 Silver, 1 Bronze.

XVII National Paralympic Swimming Championship Udaypur

- 2 Gold, 1 Silver

State Open Championship Sydney Olympic Park Aquatic Center Australia 2017

- 1 Gold

Arabian sea Mumbai 2017

- Open water Sea Swimming feat of 33 Kilo Meter in Arabian sea Mumbai 4 May 2017

Para – International Swimming Championship Gatineau, Canada 2016

- 2 Silvers, 1 Bronze

== Awards ==
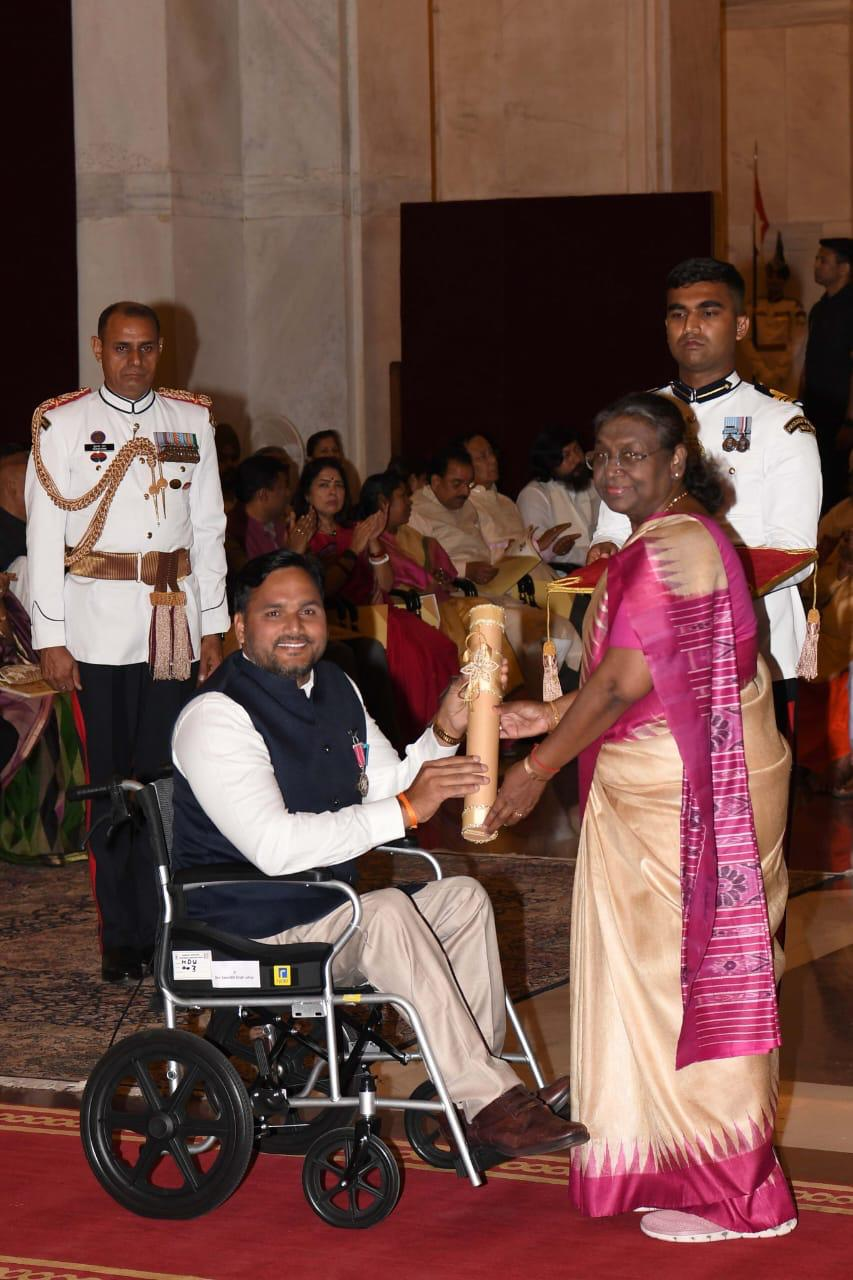
The President, Smt. Droupadi Murmu presenting Padma Shri to Shri Satendra Singh Lohiya

Satendra received National Award for the Best Sport Person of the Year from the Vice President of India at New Delhi, Award Given by the social justice of India on 3 December 2019. He also received the Tenzing Norgay National Adventure Award 2019. Recipient of Outstanding Young Person OF India Award Winner 2021 from President of JCI India in Recognition of Excellence in the Para Swimming Sport. Recipient of JCI Gwalior Ratna Alankar 2022 Outstanding Young Person from President JCI Gwalior in Recognition to outstanding person achievement.

== Divyang Empowerment Khelo Yatra ==
Satendra Singh Lohiya led the Sashaktikaran Khelo Yatra to promote equality and dignity for persons with disabilities in India. From April 14 to May 3, 2023, he covered 4,320 km from Kanyakumari to Lal Chowk, Kashmir, in 19 days using a specially designed Divyang bike. The initiative aimed to raise awareness about Para Sports in rural and urban areas, fostering inclusivity and empowerment for Divyangjan.

== A Life-Changing Approach ==
In 2024, a book titled "A Life-Changing Approach" was written on Satendra Singh Lohiya by author Devrishi. The book's foreword was penned by P. Narahari, IAS, and it was officially released on February 27, 2024, by Madhya Pradesh Sports Minister Vishwas Sarang. The book highlights Satendra's journey, achievements, and contributions to the empowerment of Divyang athletes.
