= Chandraprabha (given name) =

Chandraprabha is a given name. Notable people with the name include:

- Chandraprabha Aitwal (born 1941), Indian mountain climber
- Chandraprabha Urs (1946–2016), Indian National Congress politician

== See also ==
- Chandraprabha, the eighth Tirthankara of Avasarpini
