= Rishiking =

Indian music composer and filmmaker (born 1992)

- Also known as: Devrishi
- Born: Rishikesh Pandey; 16 May 1992 (age 34); Panna, Madhya Pradesh, India
- Genres: Devotional; classical; Hip hop; R&B
- Occupations: Composer, author, filmmaker, screenwriter, social worker
- Instruments: Vocals; piano; keyboards
- Years active: 2016–present
- Labels: T-Series; Tips; Kingslord
- Website: devrishi.org

Rishikesh Pandey (born 16 May 1992) also known as Devrishi, is an Indian philosopher, author and composer. Previously known as Rishiking, he has also worked as a filmmaker and screenwriter. He is the founder of Sadhnam and the co-founder of Sanatan Wisdom a nonprofit organization. He has written and composed several songs for public awareness campaigns. Later he shifted his focus to devotional music and spirituality. Devrishi is involved in documenting places associated with Lord Krishna. He is the author of The Krishna Effect, published in Hindi as Shri Krishna Pathey, with a foreword by Chief Minister Mohan Yadav.

== Career ==
Rishikesh Pandey began his career as a teacher and after a year he moved to the creative department at own advertising agency and gradually established himself as a filmmaker and composer. In 2024, he transitioned into spirituality, promoting Sanatan culture and Vedic meditation. In 2025, he adopted the name Devrishi as his new spiritual identity, having previously worked in the film and music industry under the stage name Rishiking. In 2026, he founded Sadhnam, a wellness initiative integrating sound, mantra, yoga and Ayurveda, under the name Devrishi.

== Music career ==
Rishikesh started his music career with singer Shaan in 2016 with a song "School Chale Hum". And also in the year 2016 he made Ho Halla a swachhta anthem song for Indore city together with P Narahari IAS, which was sung again by Shaan and it was the biggest hit to make Indore's people aware towards cleanness and by this cleanness movement Indore got the number one tag for cleanness across all over India. After the success of ho halla song and to celebrate the title of Number one clean city of India, Indore was decided to make this success memorable so far that a live musical concert held by Indore Municipal Corporation on 23 December 2017 In this concert Rishiking introduce himself as a rapper with the company of singer Shaan on the same stage.

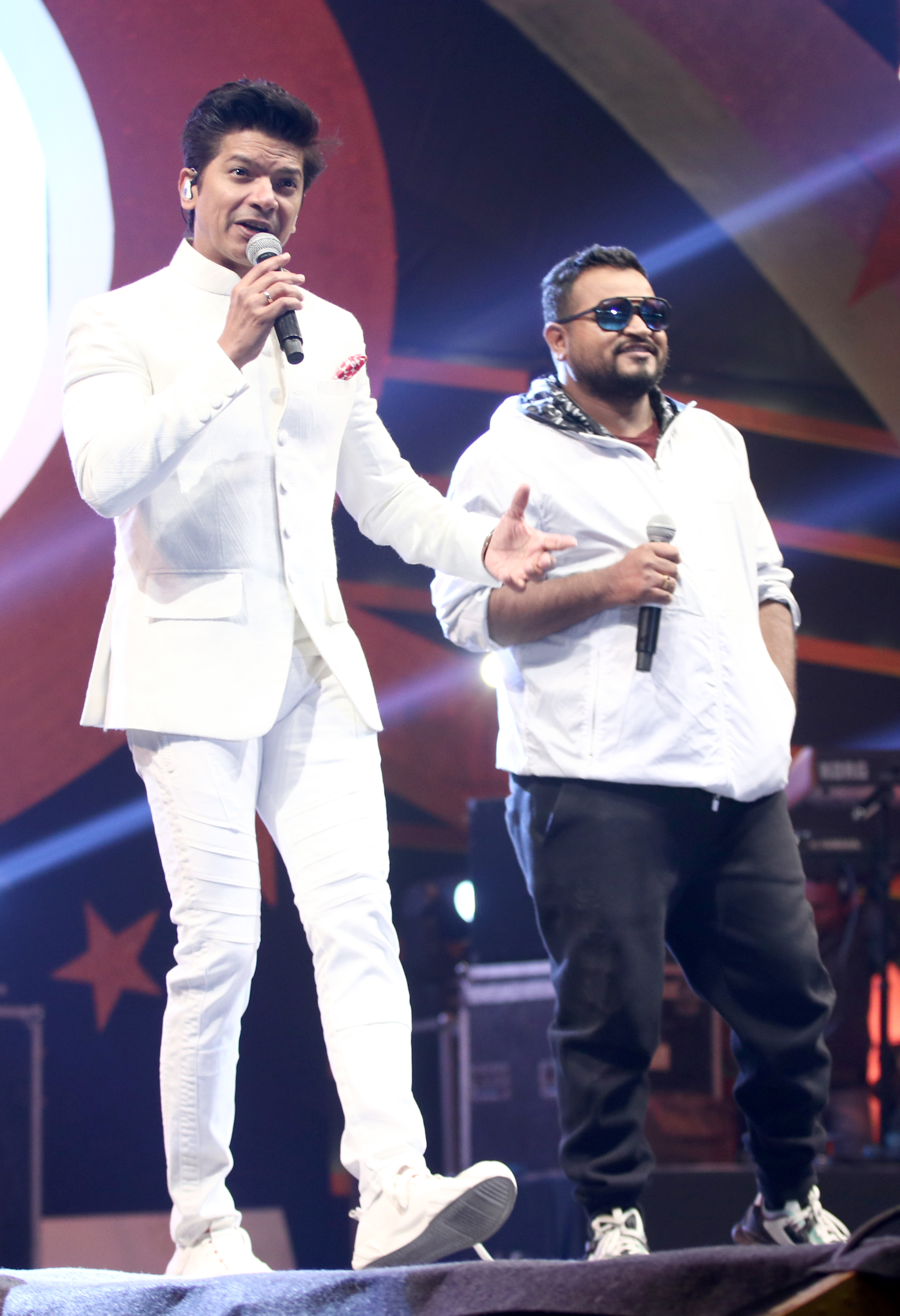
Shaan & Rishiking Live in Bhopal

He along with P Narahari IAS launched the musical program Swachhta Ke Sur in 2020 under Swachh Bharat Mission to make people aware through music, which included Bollywood singer Shaan, Shankar Mahadevan, Javed Ali, Payal Dev and Dev Negi.

== Bibliography ==
=== Books ===
- The Krishna Effect (2025), published by Mahagatha, is a philosophical novel that explores Lord Krishna's teachings in the context of modern life. ISBN 978-93-6212-011-3
- Ramraja: Ram Ka Rajyabhishek (2024), co-authored with P. Narahari IAS, Published by Mahagatha ISBN 978-81-967541-7-4
- A Life Changing Approach (2024), published by Mahagatha, is a biography of Padma Shri awardee Satendra Singh Lohiya. ISBN 978-81-967541-0-5

== Filmography ==
Year	Film	Director	Producer	Screenwriter	Music composer	Notes
2023	Rama Rajyam	Yes	Yes	Yes	Yes	International Historical Film
2023	Ahimsa	Teja	Executive Producer	Teja	Music Producer	Telugu Feature Film
2023	Mom's Coming	Yes	Co-producer	Yes	Yes	Telugu language musical horror movie
2023	Prem Katha	Yes	Co-producer	Yes	Yes	Telugu language Psychological love story

== Discography ==
=== Hindi songs ===
Year	Title	Music director	Lyrics	Label	Singer
2023
2023	Jal Machhli	Yes	Rishiking	Kings Lord	Rishiking
2023	Naagraja	Yes	Rishiking	Kings Lord	Rishiking
2023	Bewafaa	Yes	Rishiking	Kings Lord	Rishiking & Dev Negi
2023	Dil Tod Gaye	Yes	Rishiking	Kings Lord	Rishiking & Dev Negi
2022	Jai Siya Ram	Yes	Rishiking	Kings Lord	Rishiking, Dev Negi & Mithila
2022	Dj ki Dhunn	Yes	Rishiking	Kings Lord	Rishiking, Nakash Aziz & Asees Kaur
2022	Baarish	Yes	Rishiking	Kings Lord	Rishiking & Payal Dev
2022	Mere Mahakaal	Yes	Rishiking	Kings Lord	Rishiking & Pritam Kumar
2021	Fatfatiya	Yes	Rishiking	Kings Lord	Rishiking & Priya Nair
2021	Buri Nazar	Yes	Rishiking	Kings Lord	Rishiking
2021	Leloo	Yes	Rishiking	Kings Lord	Rishiking
2021	Dil Ki Baat – First Love	Yes	Rishiking	Kings Lord	Rishiking
2021	Bam Bhole	Yes	Rishiking	Kings Lord	Rishiking
2021	Ganesha	Yes	Rishiking	Kings Lord	Rishiking, Dev Negi & Jatinder Singh
2020	Jai Hind	Yes	P Narahari & Rishiking	Ree Musical	Rishiking & Jatinder Singh
2020	Jeena	Yes	P Narahari & Rishiking	Ree Musical	Dev Negi
2020	Jai Ho – Corona Warrior	Yes	P Narahari	Ree Musical	Shaan
2020	Helmet	Yes	Rishiking	Ree Musical	Rishiking
2020	Plastic	Yes	Rishiking & P Narahari	Ree Musical	Shankar Mahadevan & Rishiking
2019	Chauka	Yes	Rishiking & P Narahari	Ree Musical	Shankar Mahadevan & Rishiking
2019	You Are Special	Yes	P Narahari	Ree Musical	Shivang Mathur & Deepanshi Nagar
2019	MP Swachhta Anthem	Yes	P Narahari	Ree Musical	Shaan, Payal Dev, Rishiking, Javed Ali & Dev Negi
2019	Swachhta ki Rajdhani	Yes	Rishiking	Ree Musical	Shaan
2019	Cheer Haran	Yes	Rishiking & P Narahari	Ree Musical	Payal Dev & Rishiking
2018	Hattrck	Yes	Rishiking & P Narahari	Hribom	Shaan, Jubin Nautiyal, Payal Dev & Rishiking
2018	Mera Madhya Pradesh	Yes	Rishiking & P Narahari	Hribom	Shankar Mahadevan & Dev Negi
2018	Ao Chale School	Yes	Rishiking & P Narahari	Hribom	Shaan, Jyotica Tangri & Suzanne D'Mello
2018	Desh Ka Maan	Yes	Rishiking	Hribom	Mohit Chauhan, Amit Mishra & Payal Dev
2018	Jai Madhya Pradesh	Yes	Rishiking	Hribom	Shaan & Asees Kaur
2018	Jashn-e-Agra	Yes	Rishiking	Hribom	Shaan
2018	Mor Raipur	Yes	Rishiking	Hribom	Javed Ali
2018	Kisan Geet	Yes	Rishiking	Hribom	Javed Ali
2018	Gumshuda	Yes	Rishiking	Hribom	Rishiking
2017	Ho Halla Again	Yes	Rishiking	Hribom	Shaan
2017	Hai Halla	Yes	Rishiking & P Narahari	Hribom	Shaan & Payal Dev
2016	Ho Halla	Yes	Rishiking & P Narahari	Hribom	Shaan
2016	School Chale Hum	Yes	Rishiking	Hribom	Shaan

=== Telugu songs ===
Year	Title	Music director	Lyrics	Label	Singer
2019	Memega Netannalam	Yes	P Narahari	Ree Musical	Payal Dev
2019	Sagam Sagam	Yes	Sreekanth	Ree Musical	Shaan & Suzanne D'Mello
