= Paramvir Singh =

Indian Air Force Officer

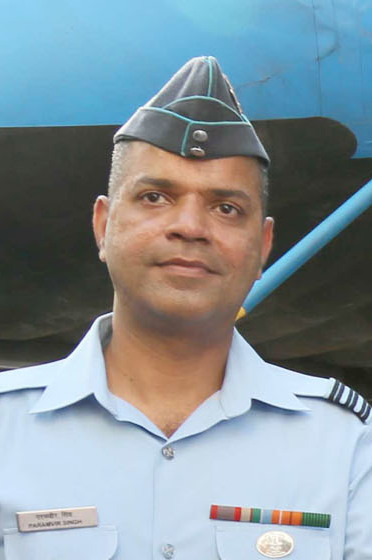

Group Captain Paramvir Singh (born 28 July 1975) is an Indian Air Force officer and Adventure Sports athlete. He is an open-water endurance swimmer with multiple records to his credit, having led expeditions to the English Channel, unexplored channels in the Arabian Sea, one of which broke a world record, and the historic first-ever swim down the entire stretch of the River Ganga as well as an Ultra Triathlon and Duathlon athlete.

== Initial expeditions ==
Param started as a competitive pool swimmer during his school days and later moved on to open water distance swimming.

Between 26 June and 5 July 2012 he led the first-ever Indian Armed Forces open water expedition to the English Channel. The Indian Air Force team "Delphinus" led by Param swam the English Channel from England to France twice within this period. The team was awarded the Montserrat Tresserras Shield by the Channel Swimming Association for being the fastest team for the year 2012.

In October–November 2013 Param led the Indian Air Force Team "Aqua Scullers" rafting down the entire stretch of the River Ganga from Gangotri in Uttarakhand to Gangasagar in West Bengal, covering a distance of over 3000 km, in 16 days, establishing several records, including the longest distance covered by raft in a single day.

On 8 October 2014 Param led the first-ever medley relay open water swim in Asia, swimming from Mora Jetty to Kanheri Angre Lighthouse in the Arabian Sea. A few days later he again led the Indian Air Force team "Delphinus" during the Around Mumbai Swimathon. The team was the first to successfully swim around Mumbai in clockwise direction, covering a distance of 286 km, which was then recognised as the longest open water swim in Asia.

== Later Expeditions and Social Campaigning ==
=== Goa to Mumbai World Record Swim ===
In February 2015 Param led the amateur open water swim team "The Sea Hawks" swimming 433.11 km from Goa to Mumbai in 119.59 hours, breaking the World record held by Israel in the category of "longest open water 6-person relay swim." This expedition was dedicated to the "Beti Bachao, Beti Padhao" national mission of the Government of India and the team campaigned extensively throughout the expedition.

=== First Ever Swim Down the River Ganga : Expedition Ganga Avahan ===
The historic Tri-Services expedition, "Ganga Avahan" was conceived, planned, organised and led by Param as the first-ever swim down the entire length of the River Ganga, in support of the Prime Minister Narendra Modi's "Swachh Bharat" national mission, "Clean Ganga" campaign, and "Beti Bachao, Beti Padhao" initiative. The team was flagged off in New Delhi by the Hon'ble Minister for Urban Development, Shri M. Venkaiah Naidu. The swim commenced from Dev Prayag in Uttarakhand on 8 October 2015, and culminated at Frazerganj in West Bengal, covering a total distance of 2800 km, taking 43 days. The expedition was flagged in at New Delhi by the Hon'ble Minister for Defence, Shri Manohar Parrikar. The expedition created 3 World Records, including the largest social campaign ever through an adventure event.

=== 635 km Ultra Triathlon ===
On 25 February 2016 Param led the team "The Sea Hawks" in an Nonstop Ultra-Triathlon event called "Endurothon Gateway Challenge." The event commenced at the Gateway of India, Mumbai with a swim leg of 65 km of open water swimming in the Arabian Sea. This was followed by 400 km of cycling and 170 km of marathon running, culminating at the starting point, Gateway of India, Mumbai. The 2-person team covered a total distance of 635 km in 71.45 hours. Throughout the event the team campaigned for Rotary International's End Polio mission and for Start-up India national mission. The Triathlon Federation of India ratified the expedition as the most challenging Triathlon ever in the World.

=== Third Crossing of English Channel ===
Again in June 2016, Param led the 6-person team "The Sea Hawks" for another crossing of the English Channel, in support of Rotary International's Peace and Conflict Resolution initiative. This was the third crossing of the English Channel for Param.

=== Mumbai to Mangalore World Record Swim ===
The Tribute Swim was Param's third expedition in 2016, leading The Sea Hawks again on their most audacious Open Water Stage Swim till date. The swim was undertaken as a tribute to the soldiers of the Indian Armed Forces, martyred during the numerous terror attacks on Indian soil through the year, in Pathankot, Uri and Nagrota, and to the victims and martyrs of the horrific 26/11 Mumbai terror attacks. Union Minister for Energy, Mr. Piyush Goyal flagged off the expedition at the majestic Gateway of India, Mumbai, handing over the flag to Wing Commander Param, in the presence of several dignitaries, including Smt. Amruta Fadnavis, the wife of the Chief Minister of Maharashtra, and consular representatives from all the countries whose nationals had lost their lives during the 26/11 events. The 6 swimmers swam non-stop from Mumbai to Mangalore, covering a distance of 1,031 kilometres taking a total of 12 days, breaking two World Records in the process, the Longest Distance Open Water Relay (team of six) held by the Night Train Swimmers of the USA, for 500.50 km and the Longest Distance Open Water Swim by a Team of Unlimited Swimmers, for 684.75 km by 200 swimmers in UK.

=== Delhi to Dras Ultra-endurance Duathlon ===
On 26 July 2017, he led ‘Victory Run’ the ultra-endurance 1,400 km Duathlon from Delhi to Dras, undertaken by 16 athletes from the Armed Forces, taking 31 days. The duathlon was dedicated to the martyrs of the Kargil War.

=== Ganga Aamantran Expedition 2019 ===
He led his third expedition on the River Ganga, the first ever Rafting and Kayaking expedition down the river, from Devprayag to Bakkhali beach. The expedition was organised and undertaken under the aegis of the Ministry for Jal Shakti, Govt. of India and the National Mission for Clean Ganga (NMCG), as an adventure sports-cum-public outreach expedition, creating awareness on Water Conservation and Ganga Rejuvenation. The expedition was flagged-off in New Delhi by the Minister for Jal Shakti, Shri Gajendra Singh Shekhawat, on 7 October 2019. The abhiyan started out from Devprayag on 10 October, crossing the five states and through the Ganga Basin. The expedition culminated 34 days later, in Frazerganj at Bakkhali beach (West Bengal) on 12 November 2019.

== Awards and recognition ==
Group Captain Paramvir Singh was conferred with the Tenzing Norgay National Adventure Award for the year 2014 for his outstanding contributions in Water Sports, the highest award in Adventure Sports bestowed by the Government of India, equivalent to the Arjuna Award.

The World Open Water Swimming Association (WOWSA) nominated the expedition Ganga Avahan for the Best Swim Performance of the Year 2015.

The Prime Minister of India, Narendra Modi, lauded Param for his social campaigning for the Swachh Bharat National Mission during the first ever swim down the holy river Ganga, during the September 2016 telecast of his monthly radio programme "Mann Ki Baat".

In recognition of his efforts to raise public awareness against terror and spreading the message of Peace, Param was awarded The Peace Award by the Global Peace Initiative 2016 on 25 November 2016, at the Welingkar Institute for Management, Mumbai.

The YES Foundation conferred the YES I Am The Change award on him for the year 2017, in recognition of his social campaigning through adventure sports.

Bhartiya Vidya Bhawan conferred the prestigious "Kulapati Munshi Award" for 2017 on him, in recognition of his outstanding contributions in the field of adventure sports and social campaigning.

WOWSA, the World Open Water Swimming Association, included Param in their 2017 list of the World's 50 Most Adventurous Open Water Men.
