= Swachhta Ke Sur =

- Location: Indore, Bhopal, Gwalior, Jabalpur, Ujjain, India
- Date(s): 2020-present
- Producers: Rishiking (2020–present); Sadhana Pandey (2020–present)
- Website: swachhtakesur.com

Swachhta ke sur is a musical program in which people are made aware of Swachh Bharat by conducting live musical concerts through Bollywood singers. The program started on 12 January 2020 from Ujjain, Madhya Pradesh in which Bollywood singer Payal Dev and Rishiking gave a presentation. Through this program, auditioning new singers is also provided to them through a platform. This concept was developed by Urban Administration and Development, Madhya Pradesh Commissioner P Narahari IAS. The program is directed by Rishiking under the banner of Folk Culture & Ree Musical.

== Summary ==
There are two stages of Swachhta Ke Sur, first is the state level singing competition and the second is to provide the stage to the winning competitions with the Bollywood singers in the cities. Young people participate in this show and are judged on the basis of their voice quality, singing talent and versatility in their performance. It started in Madhya Pradesh with the first season in 2020. In first season Bollywood singer Shaan, Javed Ali, Payal Dev, Rishiking and Shankar Mahadevan were added. On 19 January 2020, Bhopal Madhya Pradesh Government Minister Public Relations P. C. Sharma, old cabinet Minister Suresh Pachouri, Urban Administration and Development, Madhya Pradesh Commissioner P Narahari IAS and Bhopal Municipal Corporation Commissioner vijay dutta joined Singer Shaan's program and together they also honored the new talent winner Singer Mohammad Salman who came out of the audition for Swachhta Ke Sur.

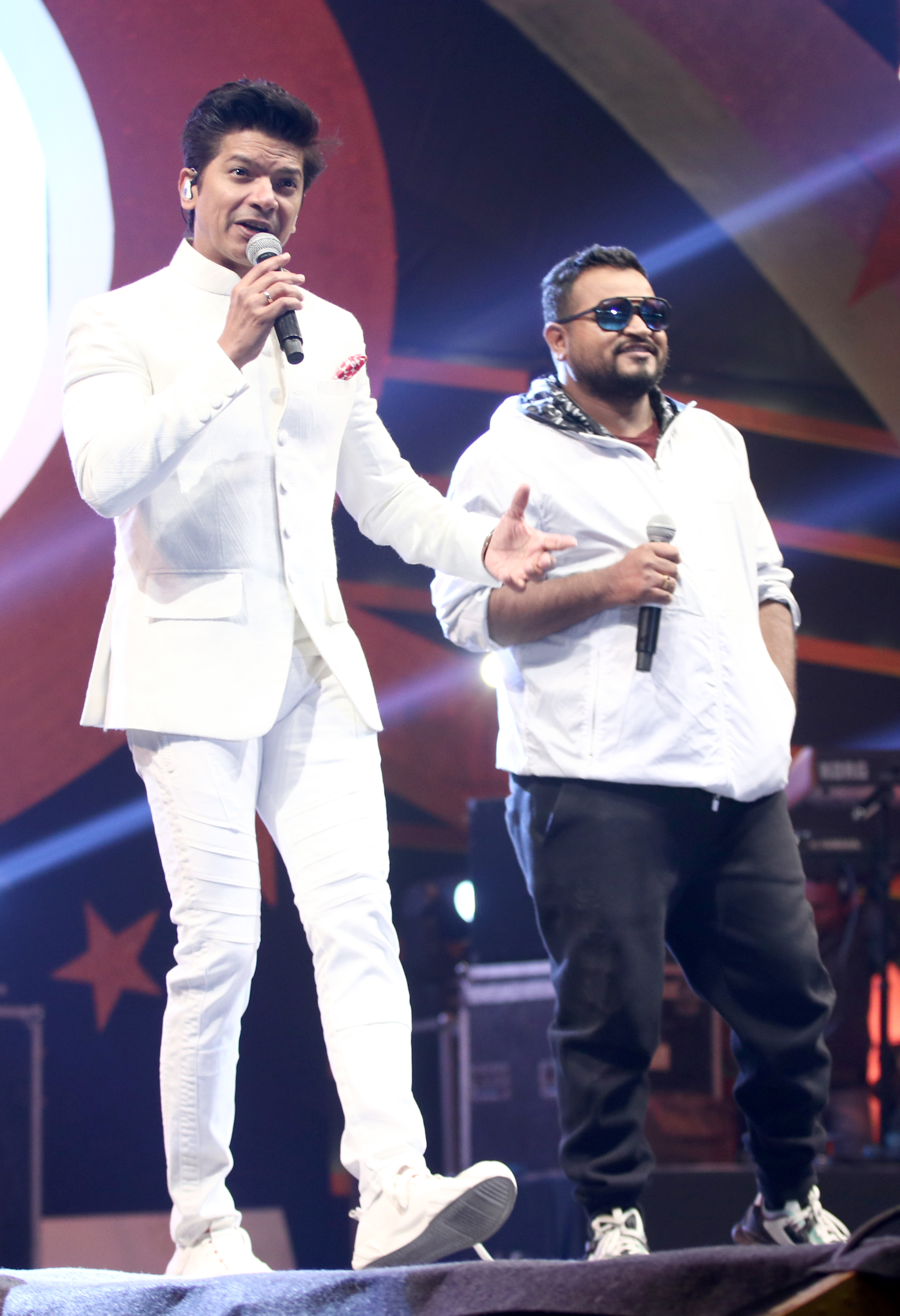
Shaan & Rishiking Live in Bhopal

=== Season 1 ===
- Payal Dev & Rishiking – 12 January 2020 Ujjain
- Javed Ali & Rishiking – 15 January 2020 Gwalior
- Shaan & Rishiking – 19 January 2020 Bhopal
- Javed Ali & Rishiking – 26 January 2020 Indore
- Dev Negi & Rishiking – 2 February 2020 Jabalpur

=== Season 2 ===
Swachhta ke sur Season 2 will start in January 2023 with Singer Shankar Mahadevan, Kailash Kher, Shaan, Sid Sriram, Javed Ali, Payal Dev, Mangli and Rapper Rishiking under Folk Culture India Association and Kingslord.
