= The Krishna Effect =

2025 novel by Devrishi

- Author: Devrishi
- Language: English
- Genre: Philosophical fiction
- Publisher: Mahagatha
- Publication date: 2 July 2025
- Publication place: India
- Pages: 220
- ISBN: 9789362120113

The Krishna Effect is a philosophical novel by Indian author Devrishi, published by Mahagatha in 2025.

== Plot ==
The novel follows three friends, Vyomkesh, Ayan and Svaryam, who travel from Vrindavan to Dwarka. It also presents stories from Krishna's life, including his relationship with Rukmini and friendship with Sudama.

India Today and The Daily Jagran covered the novel's philosophical, psychological and educational themes. DNA India also covered the novel's presentation of Krishna's teachings in contemporary life and Sonic Philosophy, which draws on Vedic traditions of sound and chanting.

== Publication ==
The novel was published by Mahagatha in July 2025. A Hindi edition titled Shri Krishna Pathey was also published. Madhya Pradesh Chief Minister Mohan Yadav wrote its foreword. The novel also inspired a project by Sanatan Wisdom to document places associated with Lord Krishna's life and journeys.
