= Narender Singh Yadav =

Indian mountaineer

Narender Singh Yadav (born 15 December 1994) is an Indian mountaineer. He is best known for his controversial climbing expedition to Mount Everest in May 2016, where he claimed to have summited the mountain but had recognition of this attempt stripped years later after discrepancies were noticed which indicated he had faked the summit, leading to his 2020 Tenzing Norgay National Adventure Award being revoked and a ban from the mountain for six years from the climbing date by the Nepali government in 2021. In May 2022, soon after his ban expired, he returned to Everest and successfully reached the summit with ample proof that he had actually done so.

== Biography and career ==
Narender Singh Yadav was born on 15 December 1994. He hails from Nehrugarh village in Rewari district, Haryana, and is the son of Indian Army soldier Krishnachand. He had studied for his MA at Starex University in Gurgaon district.

In July 2018, Yadav claimed to have made a new record by summiting and descending Kilimanjaro the fastest, recording times of 17 hours and 9 hours 17 minutes for each respective segment; this was subsequently registered in the Limca Book of Records. Yadav has stated that he wishes to climb the highest mountain on every continent; as of 2022, he had summited five (out of seven assuming the seven-continent model) - Kilimanjaro, (Africa), Aconcagua (South America), Everest (Asia), Elbrus (Europe) and Kosciuszko (Australia) - with Denali (North America) and Vinson (Antarctica) still remaining.

=== Everest climbs and controversy ===
In 2016, he joined that year's Seven Summit Treks Everest Expedition as a climber on a three-member team (out of the 14-15 total on the expedition). Yadav had reportedly previously attempted to summit the mountain in 2014 and 2015 but could not do so because of the threat of avalanches. He had claimed to successfully reach the peak of Everest on this expedition, which would have made him the second-youngest Indian to do so. However, his team leader, Naba Kumar Phukon, would later claim that he had never certified his summit; according to him, Yadav and his teammate Seema Rani Goswami were struggling to climb due to fatigue and acute altitude sickness, and needed to be rescued by Sherpa guides after they continued into the "death zone" beyond Camp IV (the highest camp on the mountain) despite their condition; a number of rescuers concurred with this account. However, the expedition company still reported both of them as having summited the mountain, and they were granted certificates by the government of Nepal. The Record, a Nepal-based news website, tied this in to a growing phenomenon of "fake summits" enabled by corruption among expedition companies and officials, and identified India as a growing source of faux summiteers due to a number of state governments, such as Haryana, offering jobs and other perks to those who make it.

The Indian government announced that Yadav would be conferred with the Tenzing Norgay National Adventure Award in August 2020 for his mountaineering career. This reignited scrutiny after pictures of his purported summit were posted online by the Nepali-language newspaper Kantipur in an article pointing out discrepancies such as a lack of tube for his oxygen mask and an absence of reflections in his climbing sunglasses, and suggested he had used another photo and digitally manipulated it to produce the resulting image. This eventually led to numerous Indian climbers agreeing with this assessment on social media and calling for the revocation of the award for Yadav. Eventually, the award was cancelled as Yadav was practicing for the ceremony, and an officer made him return the commemorative jacket that he had already been given. This also prompted an investigation by the Nepalese government, which concluded in February 2021. It found that Yadav had falsified evidence and lied about reaching the peak, concluding with a ruling that banned him from Everest for six years backdated to start from his claimed summit date of 20 May 2016.

Yadav, who continues to insist that his 2016 attempt was legitimate, said that he and his parents faced humiliation from other people in his village. He decided to climb Everest again, training for two years amidst the restrictions introduced to deal with the COVID-19 pandemic. In April 2022, he returned to Nepal as the leader of the "Azadi Ka Amrit Mahotsav Fastest Everest Expedition 2022". He acquired a permit and was able to fly directly to Everest Base Camp the day after his ban expired. After climbing for six days, he successfully summited Everest on the morning of May 27. This time, measures were taken by the organisers to ensure that evidence was abundant for his ascent, such as sending two guides instead of the usual one and taking numerous photos and videos. The tourism department of Nepal recorded and certified that he had summited Everest on 1 June 2022.
