= Rachel Thomas (skydiver) =

Indian skydiver

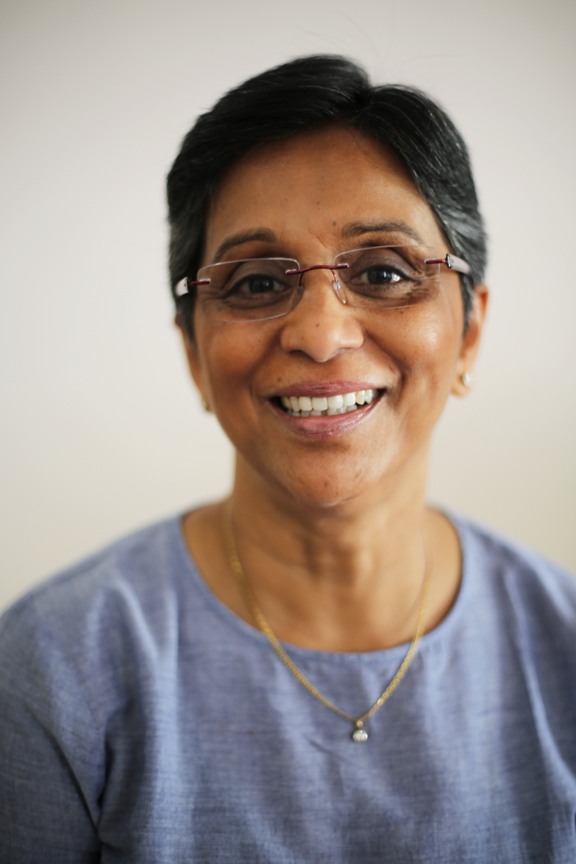
- Born: Kerala, India
- Occupations: Skydiver, teacher, PR
- Years active: 1979-present
- Known for: First female skydiver in India
- Children: Annie Thomas; Dennis Thomas
- Awards: Padma Shri, 2005; People of the Year - Limca Book, 2003; Indira Gandhi Priyadashni Award, 1995; National Adventure Award, 1994; Railway Ministers Award, 1993; Air Chief’s Commendation, 1992

Rachel Thomas is an Indian skydiver. She was the first Indian woman to skydive from 7,000 ft over the North Pole on 20 April 2002, to commemorate 150 years of the Indian Railways.

During the North Pole expedition she stayed on the ice for six days in - 45-55 °C temperature. A former employee of Indian Railways, she was the first woman to compete for India in a skydiving competition in 1987 and has the record of being the first Indian female to skydive over the North Pole in 2002. She completed 650 jumps in 18 countries during her career, since her first jump in 1979. A winner of the National Adventure Sports Award, she was honored again by the Government of India, again in 2005, with the fourth highest Indian civilian award of Padma Shri.

== Early years ==
Rachel Thomas was born in 1955, at Chittranjan, West Bengal, India. Her parents Alexander and Elizabeth Ittercherya were from Kerala and both worked with the Indian Railways. She has a sister Susan. She did her Senior Cambridge from St. Joseph's Convent Chandernagar, in West Bengal.

She was married at 17 to Capt. K. Thomas. Their first child, Dennis, was born a year later. Her daughter, Annie, at the age of 20, would become a Femina Miss India winner in 1998. The couple divorced after 10 years.

Thomas graduated from Agra University, with a Gold Medal in Literature. She later completed her Bachelor in Education from Bakunti Devi College at Agra with a First Division. She taught at St. George's School Agra for several years before she joined the Indian Railways.

== Skydiving career ==
On 20 April 1979, Thomas became the first female skydiver for India, starting her career by completing her "A" license from the Skydiving Federation of India at Agra. She was just 24 years old, a mother of two children, and a civilian when she achieved this feat. A year later she completed 15 jumps which led to her joining the Skydiving Demonstration Team.

Thomas did her first demonstration jump at Jabalpur for the Army Ordnance C, Celebration using a Para Commander for the first time.

1983: Thomas was part of the Demonstration Team for Federation Aeronautical International Annual Conference, hosted by the Aero Club of India. The jump was completed at Safderjung Airport, New Delhi. This led her to meet Claude Gillard, President of the Australian Parachute Federation, a Delegate at the Conference, who invited her to attend the Australian National Parachuting Championship in Australia the following year.

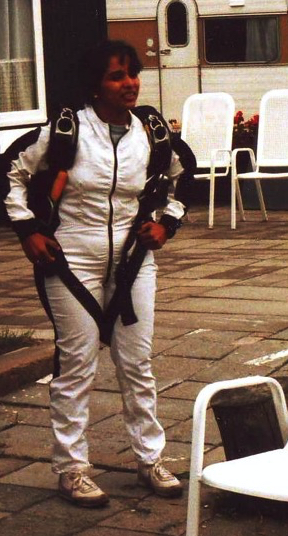
Thomas, September 1986

1986: Thomas received a scholarship from the Hon. Prime Minister Rajiv Gandhi to attend the USA for further training. She completed over 150 Jumps at Raeford, North Carolina. She also completed her first tandem jump and underwent the Basic Accelerated Freefall Course. She also trained as an Accuracy Jumper.

== World and national competitions ==
1987: The 4th World Cup of Champions in Accuracy Parachuting, Seoul. This was the first competition in which Thomas represented India. The event also marked her first jump into a sports stadium.

1988: Represented India at the 19th World Parachuting Championship at Nykoping, Sweden. This was Thomas' second World Competition.

1988: Took part in a 4 way Competition at Nykoping, Sweden where she completed six rounds. She also completed her first 6-way jump.

1989: Represented India at Thai Open Parachuting Championship in Accuracy.

== At national level ==
1991: The First National Skydiving Competition was held at Hindon, Airforce Station It was organized by the Airforce Adventure Foundation. Thomas was the only civilian and female competitor.

1995: Took part in the Third National Skydiving Championship in Agra, India.

== Training and practice ==
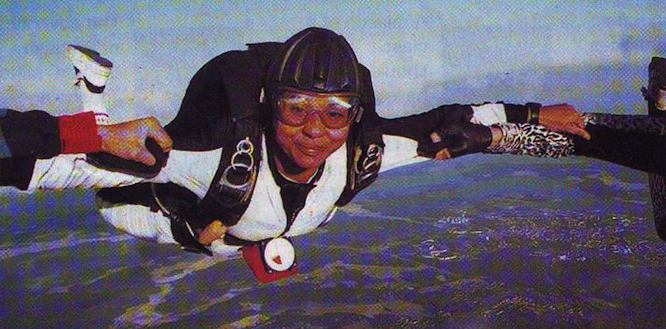
Thomas, Sweden 1988

1987: Obtained special permission to train and practice with the Indian Airforce at the Para Training School, Agra, where she completed her first skydive jump on 29 December 1987. She completed 50 practice jumps during this time.

1989: Obtained special permission to train with the Turk Hava Kuram - the Aero Club of Turkey with their team. Her first jump was at Inonu, Turkey, from an AN-2. On her 32nd jump, she suffered a serious malfunction which resulted in a second vertebra compression and was unable to jump for two years.

1991: Obtained permission to train in Russia at Wolosowo during which she completed 25 jumps with a trainer.

== Judging ==
1992: Decided to change her course from competition to judging. She trained as a judge at the 21st World Parachuting Championship at Triben, Austria. She is India's First Accuracy qualified FAI Judge.

1994: Judged the 22nd World Parachuting Championship at Chengdu, China.

1995: Judged the 3rd Open European Parachuting Championship at Efes, Turkey. Thomas was unable to continue judging internationally as she was unable to be current in her qualification, due to no competitions taking place in India. It is mandatory to be current in her judging skills.

== International Parachuting Commission ==
1991: Attended the International Parachuting Commission as a delegate for India in Switzerland.

1992: Was part of the bid for hosting the International Parachuting Commission in India at Paris, where they won the vote against Ireland.

1993: Represented India at the International Commission held at Washington, DC, U.S.A.

1994: Was part of the organizing team for the 45th Plenary of the International Parachuting, held at Agra, India and attended by 35 countries. This was the first international event held in parachuting by India.

1995: Attended the International Parachuting Commission in Norway.

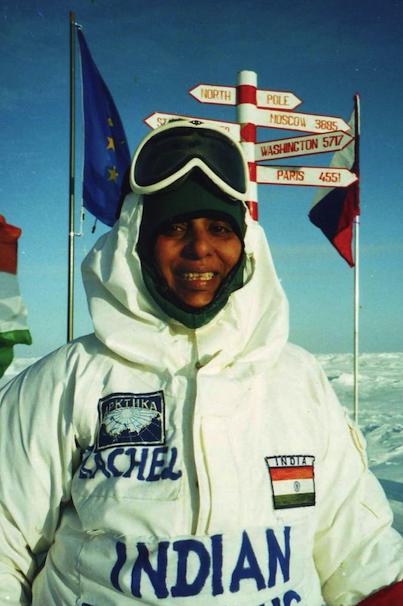
Thomas at the North Pole, 2002

== Demonstration jumps ==
1995: Skydived at the opening ceremony for the First National Youth Festival (YUVA UTSAV) at Bhopal. The event was attended by Hon. President of India, Shri. Shankar Dayal Sharma, who signed her log book for her, writing "Congratulations".

1996: Skydived at Ittanagar, Arunachal Pradesh on 20 February 1996 for their State Hood Celebrations.

1997: Skydived with the Army Adventure Team during the closing ceremony of the polo match where the Hon. President Shri K. R. Narayan, signed her log book after the jump.

1998: Skydived with the Airforce Team for the AVIA India at the Valanka, Airforce Station, Bangalore from a MI-8 aircraft from 10,000 feet. Also completed a two way jump with Sqn. Leader V.P. Sharma, from P.T.S Agra.

1999: Took part in the 5th Youth Festival at Lucknow, India.

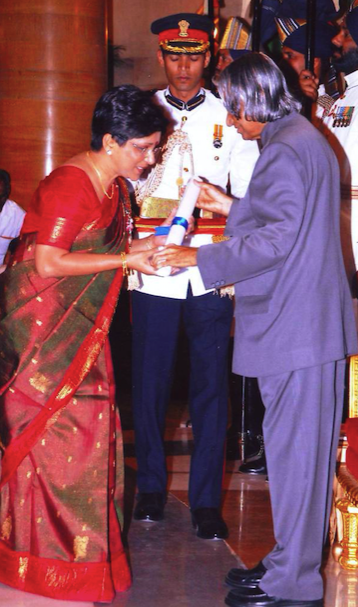
Thomas receiving Padma Shree

2000: Took part in "Operation Royal Salute" with the Jordian Special Forces in memory of the Late King Hussein of Jordan and the Marine Veteran Jumpers. Thomas also jumped with the Prince of Jordan. H.E Prince Hamzab bin Hussein.

Took part in the Air-Show-2000, organized by the Aero Club of India, at Safderjung Airport.

2001: Organized the First Friendship Jump for war Veterans. The Parachute Brigade was celebrating the 60th Raising Day on the occasion. Over 20 jumpers from 5 countries took part.

2002: Completed the first balloon jump in the country at Hissar, Haryan, for the National Youth Festival.

North Pole Jump from MI-8 on 20 April 2002. Was the First Indian Woman to Skydive at the North Pole in minus 45-55 °C from 7,000 feet, during which time she had to stay at the 89th Latitude for 6 days due to bad weather before her jump. This jump was done to commemorate 150 years of the Indian Railway, for which she was an employee.

Jumped at Chez Republic from an MI-8 aircraft.

2003: Jumped for the Youth Festival on 12 January 2003 and broke her femur bone. That was her last jump to date.

== Other achievements ==
- Was honored by the late President of Macedonia H.E. Boris Trajkovski, in 2002 after her North Pole jump
- Has a total of 656 freefall jumps to her credit.
- Has jumped from nearly 16 different aircraft.
- Has skydived in Australia, U.S., Holland, South Korea, Sweden, Thailand, Turkey, Russia, Austria, Czech Republic and Jordan (11 countries in all)
