= Parikipandla Narahari =

Indian civil servant

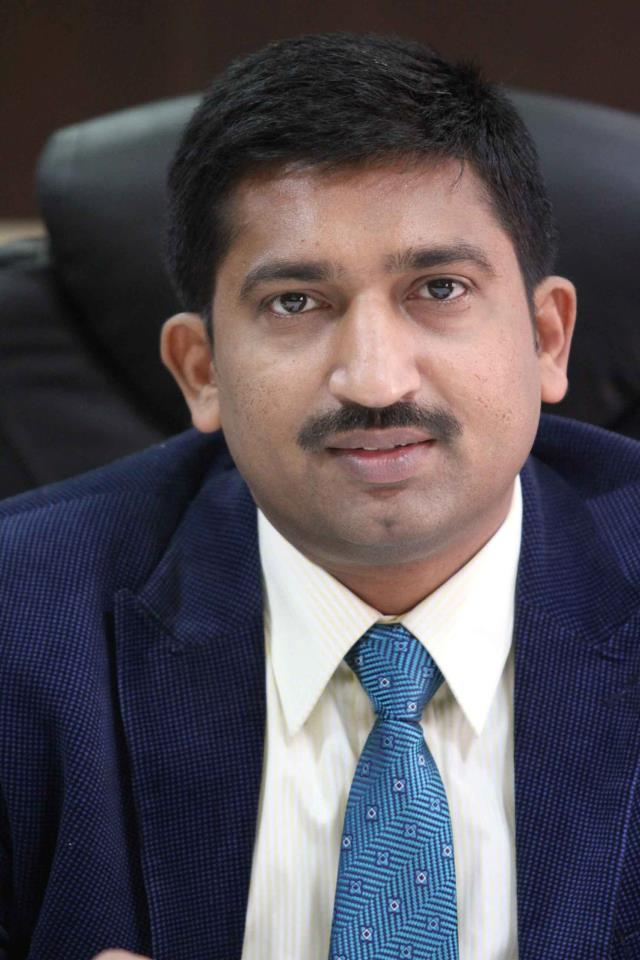
- Narahari at his Gwalior Office
- Born: 1 March 1975 (age 51); Karimnagar, Telangana
- Education: Osmania University (Vasavi College of Engineering) and Madhya Pradesh Bhoj Open University
- Occupation: Joint Secretary, Ministry of Rural Development, Government of India
- Spouse: S. B. Gita Narahari
- Children: Two

Parikipandla Narahari (born 1 March 1975) also known as P. Narahari is an Indian civil servant employed by the Indian Administrative Services and author. According to Tehelka, Narahari, in his capacity as District collector of Gwalior, is one of India's few civil servants to use social media platforms such as Twitter and Facebook to interact with citizenry to solve their problems. The issues citizens of Gwalior raise on Narahari's wall were automatically directed to concerned departments. The Better India recognized Narahari as 10 most inspiring IAS officers of the year 2017. Narahari is one among of those rare professional officers to be credited as Publicity Advisor to three successive governments of different parties.

Presently, he is serving as Joint Secretary in the Department of Land Resources, Ministry of Rural Development, Government of India.

Narahari has written ten books, Who Owns Mhow? and The Making of Ladli Laxmi Yojna. The latter concerns the Ladli Laxmi Yojana, an initiative of the Government of Madhya Pradesh planned by Narahari which later inspired Beti Bachao, Beti Padhao Yojana. He also wrote the song Ho Halla which was sung by Shaan. In 2020, he started the program of Swachhta Ke Sur under Swachh Bharat Abhiyan to make people aware, which included Bollywood singer Shaan, Shankar Mahadevan, Javed Ali, Payal Dev, Rishiking and Dev Negi.

== Early life ==
Narahari was born to Satyanarayana and Sarojana on 1 March 1975. His grandparents belong to Chintagattu village near Warangal. Narahari studied mechanical engineering at Osmania University and was selected to work with Indian Engineering Services in 1999. He was also selected for organisations Bharat Dynamics Limited (BDL), National Aluminium Company (Nalco) and Gas Authority of India Limited (GAIL). He was selected as Scientist-B at Advanced Research Centre International (ARCI), Department of Science and Technology, Government of India. He worked in this organisation from January 2000 to August 2001 till he joined the Indian Administrative Services in September 2001. He completed his schooling from India Mission Secondary School, Basantnagar. He completed Intermediate from NLVRGSRVJC(APRJC) Nimmakuru. he was brought up in basanthnagar, Peddapalli mandal, Karimnagar district, Telangana.

== Career ==
He joined the Indian Administrative Service in 2001. In 2002, he was posted as Assistant Collector at Chhindwara. He became the Assistant Collector and City Magistrate, Murar along with SDO (Revenue) & SDM Dabra in Gwalior in 2003, SDO (Revenue) & SDM Mhow in Indore in 2004. He was appointed as Municipal Commissioner of Indore Municipal Corporation in 2005. In 2006, he became Project Director ICDS & IFAD, managing director WFDC and ex-officio Deputy Secretary in Women and Child Development Department, Bhopal. In April 2007, he was transferred as chief executive officer of Chhindwara Zila Parishad and ex-officio Additional Collector (Development) there. On 9 August 2007, he became District Magistrate and Collector of Seoni, later in 2009 as DM & Collector of Singrauli, then as DM & Collector of Gwalior in 2011 and lastly as DM & Collector of Indore in 2015 and served till 2017. After serving as Revenue Secretary and Secretary and Commissioner of Aviation, Public Relations, Urban Administration Departments of Government of Madhya Pradesh and as Managing Director, Madhya Pradesh Marketing Cooperative Federation. P Narahari served as Secretary of Micro Small Medium Enterprises Department (MSME) & Sports and Youth Welfare Department from August 2021 to February 2024. He last served as Principal Secretary of Public Health Engineering Department from March 2024 to April 2026. He served as VC of MCNUJC from 8 January to 25 February 2019 and once again from 19 April to 21 May 2020.

He made Gwalior district 95% barrier-free in two years to help persons with disabilities, senior citizens, women easily access public spaces. Thus making Gwalior an example for other cities in India as reported by Satyamev Jayate.

In Indore as District Collector he focused on health, education and Smart Cities Mission. Indore also became the cleanest city in India under Swachh Bharat Abhiyan where Narahari played a key role. Narahari is credited for not only establishing Social Media wing in the Public Relations Department of Government but also making it a frequently used tool for publicity of the government programs, policies and activities.

== Discography ==
=== Hindi songs ===
Year	Title	Music director	Lyrics	Label	Singer
2020	Jai Hind	Rishiking	P Narahari	Folk Culture	Rishiking & Jatinder Singh
2020	Jeena Jeena - How to live with Covid19	Rishiking	P Narahari	Folk Culture	Dev Negi & Rishiking
2020	Jai Ho - Corona warriors	Rishiking	P Narahari	Folk Culture	Shaan
2020	Plastic	Rishiking	P Narahari	Ree Musical	Shankar Mahadevan & Rishiking
2020	Khelo Madhya Pradesh	Rishiking	P Narahari	Ree Musical	Dev Negi
2020	Helmet	Rishiking	P Narahari	Ree Musical	Rishiking
2019	Chauka	Rishiking	P Narahari	Ree Musical	Shankar Mahadevan
2019	You Are Special	Rishiking	P Narahari	Ree Musical	Shivang Mathur & Deepanshi Nagar
2019	MP Swachhta Anthem	Rishiking	P Narahari	Ree Musical	Shaan, Payal Dev, Rishiking, Javed Ali & Dev Negi
2019	Swachhta ki Rajdhani	Rishiking	P Narahari	Ree Musical	Shaan
2019	Cheer Haran	Rishiking	Rishiking & P Narahari	Ree Musical	Payal Dev & Rishiking
2018	Hattrck	Rishiking	Rishiking & P Narahari	Hribom	Shaan, Jubin Nautiyal, Payal Dev & Rishiking
2018	Mera Madhya Pradesh	Rishiking	Rishiking & P Narahari	Hribom	Shankar Mahadevan & Dev Negi
2018	Ao Chale School	Rishiking	P Narahari	Hribom	Shaan, Jyotica Tangri & Suzanne D'Mello
2017	Hai Halla	Rishiking	P Narahari	Hribom	Shaan & Payal Dev
2016	Ho Halla	Rishiking	P Narahari	Hribom	Shaan

=== Telugu songs ===
Year	Title	Music director	Lyrics	Label	Singer
2019	Memega Netannalam	Rishiking	P Narahari	Ree Musical	Payal Dev

== Bibliography ==
=== Books ===
- Who Owns Mhow?
- The Making of Ladli Laxmi Yojna
- Rise of social media in Madhya Pradesh, published by Director Public Relations department, Government of Madhya Pradesh
- Betiyaan, published by Indra Publications, Bhopal
- The Great Tale of Hinduism, published by Manjul Publications, Bhopal
- The Great Vedic Tales, published by Prabhat Prakashan, Delhi
- Swachh Indore, published by Prabhat Prakashan, Delhi
- Ram Ka Rajyabhishek, Published by Mahagatha, Delhi
- The Pasamanda Muslim of Indian Sub-Continent, Publication by Mahagatha, Delhi (Yet to be released)
- The OBCs Uprising, Published by Mahagatha, Delhi
- Shakari - Vikramaditya, Published by Mahagatha, Delhi

== Awards ==
He got more than 60 awards for his excellent performance in his administrative career till now.

- 2005: CRISIL Award 2005 for Excellence in Municipal Initiatives, as Municipal Commissioner Indore.
- 2011: Dainik Bhaskar Group's India Pride Awards, in the category of Impact Creator-Civil Servant.
- 2013: award from the Internet and Mobile Association of India for his efforts relating to use of social networks to engage citizens.
- 2014: Awarded by Madhya Pradesh Agency for Promotion of IT under category "Best project implemented through innovative use of Information Technology" of project Hamari Ladli
- 2014: Awarded by India Book of Records for organizing a tree plantation event in which 1,33,000 plants were sowed in one day
- 2014: Received Manthan Award for usage of Active Tracker Device to eliminate female foeticide under Save girls campaign.
- 2014: Received National Award for "Empowerment of Persons with Disabilities" by President Pranab Mukherjee for creation of barrier-free environment for the persons with disabilities in Gwalior district.
- 2015: Received 'Public Servant of the Year' by UBM Giving Back CSR & NGO Awards 2015.
- 2016: Received National Award for "Empowerment of Persons with Disabilities, 2016" by President Pranab Mukherjee for "Outstanding Work in the Creation of Barrier-Free Environment for the Persons with Disabilities".
- 2016: Received ‘District Collector Digital Champions’ award for influential implementation of ICT.
- 2017: Awarded at 8th NCPEDP-Mphasis Universal Design Awards 2017.
- 2018: Awarded Joint Runner-up in "e-Governance Excellence Awards Madhya Pradesh 2017" under "Improvement in Citizen Service Delivery/Governance through use of IT" category by Madhya Pradesh Agency for Promotion for Information Technology
- 2018: Received Excellent Contribution Award in "G Files Governance Awards" for his unique socio-economic development initiatives in state of Madhya Pradesh
