= Hai Halla =

Song by Shaan, Rishiking & Payal Dev
- Language: Hindi
- Released: 1 June 2017
- Genre: Melody
- Length: 3:00
- Label: Hribom
- Songwriters: Rishiking & P Narahari
- Producer: Rishiking

Music video
- "Hai Halla" on YouTube

Hai Halla is an Indore swachhta (cleanliness) celebration song. Indore Municipal Corporation and Rishiking created the song. It was sung by Shaan and Payal Dev, composed by Rishiking and conceived by P Narahari. After the song's success and Swachh Survekshan 2017 (monument held in 2017), Indore was recognized as India's cleanest city.

== Release ==
This song was released on 1 June 2017, by Venkaiah Naidu, Sumitra Mahajan and Shivraj Singh Chouhan.

== Musical Show ==
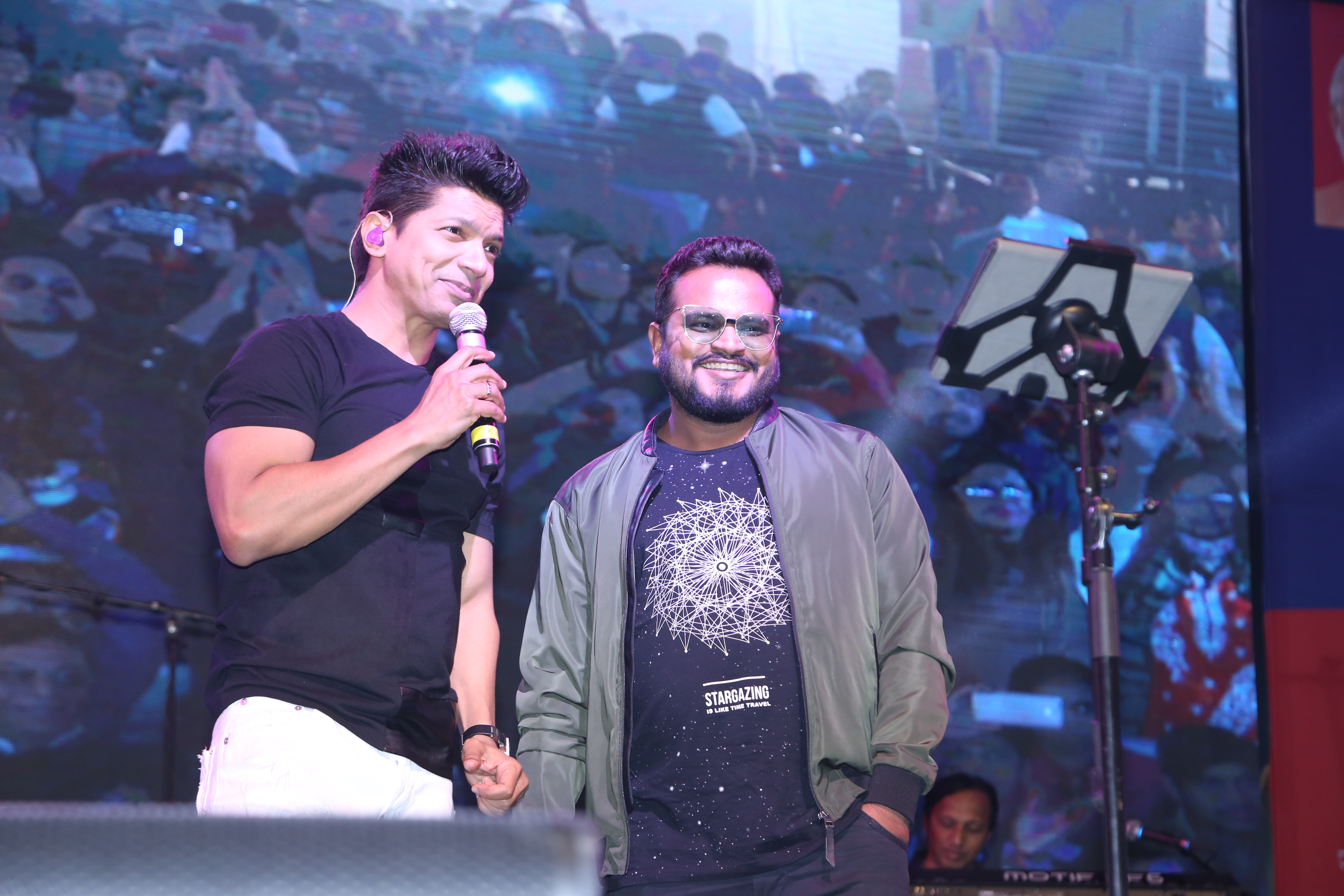
Shaan & Rishikesh Pandey Live In Indore

Indore Municipal Corporation organized a show called "Grand halla". People listened to the voice of Rishikesh Pandey and Shan on 23 December 2017. The show was free and around 45,000 residents took part.
