= Uday Kumar (mountaineer) =

Indian mountaineer,and para-athlete

Uday Kumar (born 30 May 1988) is an Indian mountaineer,and para-athlete. An above-the-knee amputee with a certified 91% physical disability, he is known for climbing high-altitude peaks using elbow crutches and for receiving the Tenzing Norgay National Adventure Award for his achievements in land adventure.

== Awards and recognition ==
- Tenzing Norgay National Adventure Award (2023): Conferred by the President of India, Droupadi Murmu, at Rashtrapati Bhavan on 17 January 2025, recognizing his contributions to land adventure.
