= Ho Halla =

Single by Shaan & Devrishi
- Language: Hindi
- Released: 30 December 2016
- Recorded: 2016
- Genre: Melody
- Length: 1:54
- Label: Hribom
- Songwriters: Devrishi & P Narahari

Shaan singles chronology
"Tum Ho Toh Lagta Hai" (2016)	"Ho Halla" (2016)	"Hai Halla" (2017)

Music video
- "Ho Halla" on YouTube

"Ho Halla" is an Indore Swachhta Anthem song for the 2017 edition of Swachh Survekshan (Cleanliness Survey), sung by Shaan, composed by Devrishi and conceived by P Narahari, an IAS Officer serving as the district collector. The purpose of the song was to encourage the city of Indore to achieve the highest levels of cleanliness. It became very popular in Indore with residents using the track as their caller tunes.

== Release ==
The song was used during Indore's 2017 Swachh Survekshan campaign and played on municipal garbage collection vehicles. It gained popularity among residents and became one of the city's signature cleanliness anthems.

== Success and impact ==
Ho Halla gained popularity beyond municipal waste-collection vehicles, reaching school assemblies, garba events and weddings, helping spread cleanliness awareness across Indore. Indore has become the number one city in India for cleanliness because of the residents, public representatives and government officials. But the credit for the changed mindset of the people has been accredited to the song "Ho Halla".
