= Shital Mahajan =

Indian diver

Padmashri Shital Mahajan
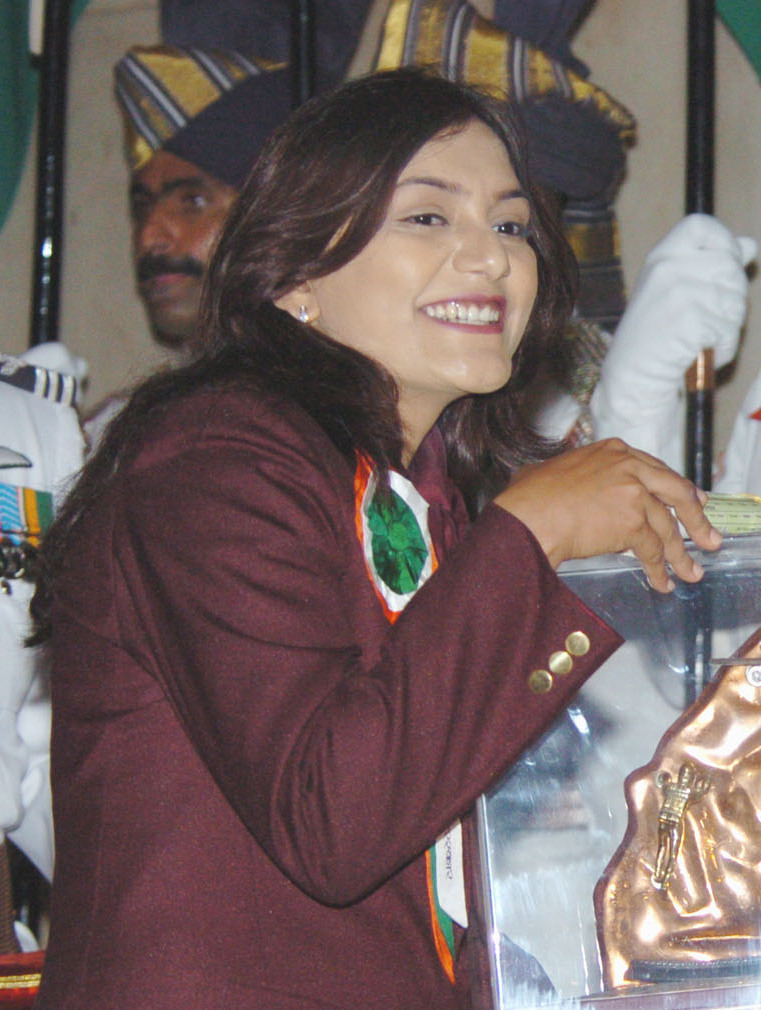
- Born: 19 September 1982 (age 43); Pune, Maharashtra, India
- Occupation: Sportsperson
- Years active: since 2004
- Spouse: Vaibhav Rane
- Children: Vrushabh Rane, Vaishnav Rane
- Parent(s): Kamalakar Mahajan; Mamta Mahajan
- Awards: Padma Shri; Tenzing Norgay National Adventure Award; Godavary Gaurav Puraskar; Shiv Chatrapati Maharashtra State Sports Special Award; Venutai Chavan Yuva Puraskar
- Website: Official web site

Shital Mahajan Rane is an Indian extreme sportsperson, skydiver and the holder of eight world records in the sport. She is known as the first woman to perform an accelerated free fall jump over Antarctica from 10,000 feet, the youngest woman to jump over both the North and South Poles, and the first woman jumper to perform it without trials. The Government of India honored Mahajan in 2011, with the fourth highest civilian award of Padma Shri.

== Biography ==
I wanted to do something different. Many women players have performed well in other sports, but none in para jumping. My achievement will inspire other girls to take up the sport, says Shital Mahajan.

Shital Mahajan was born on 19 September 1982 at Jalgaon in the Western Indian state of Maharashtra to Mamta Mahajan and Kamalakar Mahajan, an engineer working with Tata Motors. Her education was at the Fergusson College, Pune from where she graduated (BSc) in geology. Her first maiden jump was on North pole on 18 April 2004 without any training. Till Jan 2022 she has completed 766 jumps.

Shital is married to Vaibhav Rane, a software engineer working in Finland. The solemnization of the marriage was performed on a hot air balloon, 600 feet above ground, on 19 April 2008, a feat which has been recorded in the Limca Book of World Records. The couple has twin sons.

Shital Mahajan is the founder of Phoenix Skydiving Academy, a skydiving training centre based in Pune. The academy, established in 2012, provides training facilities for aspiring students and prepares students for skydiving competitions around the world.

== Achievements ==
Shital Mahajan is the first woman to perform a free fall jump over the South Pole, which was completed on 15 December 2006. She also became the first woman to perform successful jumps over the North and South Poles, without trials, when she completed her jump over the South Pole. The attempt also made her the youngest woman to achieve the feat at the age of 24. The first Indian woman to perform a wingsuit jump, Mahajan is a US certified coach.

Mahajan was a part of the team that created a world record as the first team to perform free fall parachute jump over Antarctica. She has also led a team of 85 Indian skydivers to achieve a record for maximum tandem jumps in an hour, the jumps performed on 25 August 2014 at Spain. Her jump from 13000 feet performed on 19 April 2009 is also a record for the height in women's category. She is also credited with a free fall jump from a hot air ballon at 5800 feet and a jump at 24000 feet.

== Awards and recognitions ==
Shital Mahajan was awarded Godavary Gaurav Puraskar in 2005. The same year, she received the Shiv Chatrapati Maharashtra State Sports Special Award which was followed by the Venutai Chavan Yuva Puraskar. In 2004, after her successful jump over the North Pole in 2004, Mahajan was awarded the Tenzing Norgay National Adventure Award, making her the first civilian to receive the award. In 2001, Mahajan was included the list for Republic Day honours for the fourth highest Indian civilian award of Padma Shri.

== See also ==
- Skydiving
- Adventure sports
- Limca Book of World Records
