= Udaya Kumar =

Udaya Kumar or Udayakumar may refer to:

- Udaya Kumar (academic), professor at Jawaharlal Nehru University
- Udaya Kumar (designer), designer of the Indian rupee sign
- Udaya Kumar (director), Indian film director and editor
- K. Udayakumar, Indian volleyball player
- R. V. Udayakumar, Tamil actor and director
- S. P. Udayakumar, Indian anti-nuclear activist

== See also ==
- Uday Kumar
