= Chandraprabha Aitwal =

Indian mountaineer

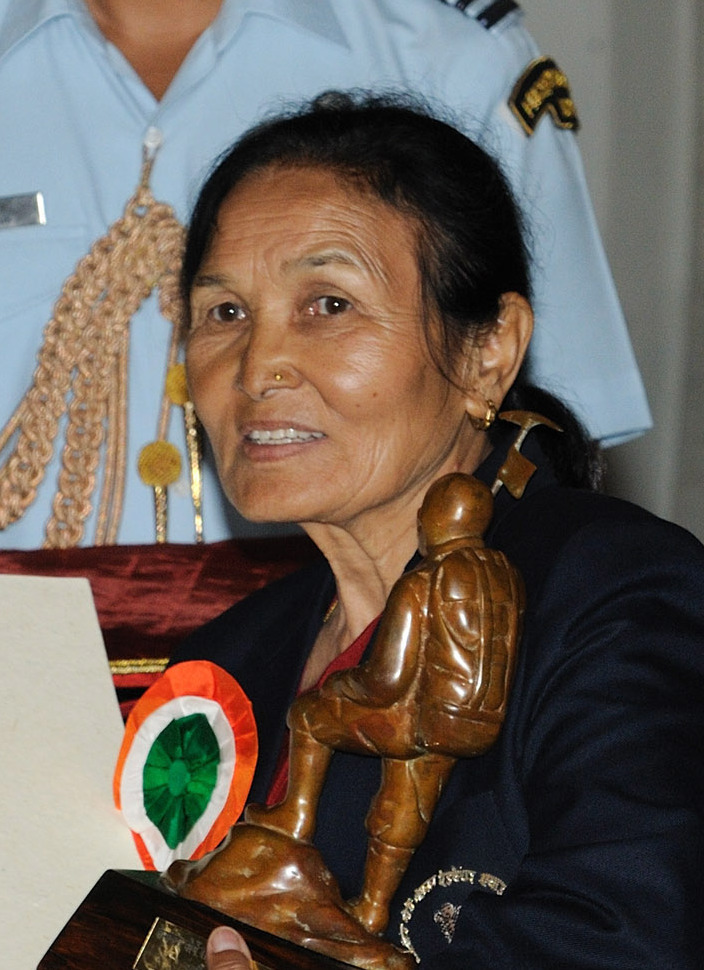
- Born: 24 December 1941 (age 84); Dharchula, Uttarakhand
- Occupation: Mountain climber

Chandraprabha Aitwal (born 24 December 1941) is an Indian mountain climber and one of the pioneers of Indian women mountaineers. She was awarded 2009 Tenzing Norgay National Adventure Award for Lifetime Achievement, given by the Indian Ministry of Youth Affairs and Sports. She has climbed Nanda Devi, Kangchenjunga, Trishuli and Mt. Jaonli.

== Early life and background ==
Aitwal grew up in Dharchula in Pithoragarh district of Uttarakhand.

== Career ==
Over the years she has reached the summits of several of peaks, including Nanda Devi in 1981. She was also part of Indian Mountaineering Federation's sponsored Mount Everest campaign in 1984. In August 2009, at the age of 68, she reached the summit of Mount Srikantha in the Garhwal Himalaya, an elevation of 6,133 m, for the second time as part of an all-woman expedition of the Indian Mountaineering Federation.

== Awards ==
- Arjun Award
- Padma Shri, India’s fourth highest civilian honors in 1990

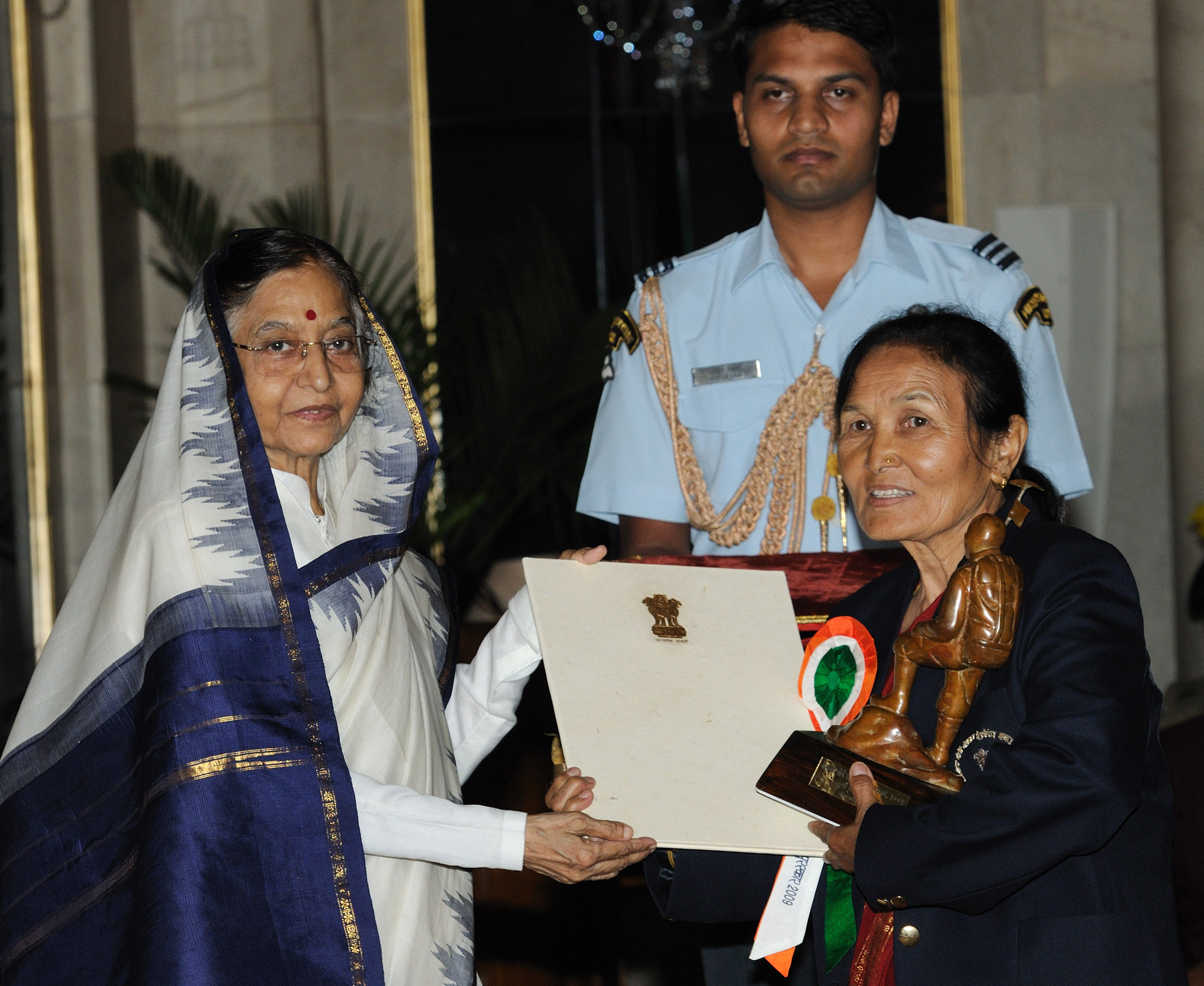
Pratibha Patil presenting the Tenzing Norgay National Adventure Award-2009 to Aitwal for Life Time Achievement, in 2010

== See also ==
- List of Mount Everest records of India
