= Tenzing Norgay National Adventure Award =

Indian adventure sports award

- Civilian award for achievements in the field of adventure
- Awarded for: Highest adventure sports honour in India
- Sponsored by: Government of India
- Reward: ₹15 lakh (US$16,000)
- First award: 1994
- Final award: 2020

Highlights
- Total awarded: 139
- Website: www.yas.nic.in

Precedence
- Equivalent: Arjuna Award

The Tenzing Norgay National Adventure Award, formerly known as the National Adventure Awards is the highest adventure sports honour of the Republic of India. The award is named after Tenzing Norgay, one of the first two individuals to reach the summit of Mount Everest along with Edmund Hillary in 1953. It is awarded annually by the Ministry of Youth Affairs and Sports. The recipients are honoured for their "outstanding achievement in the field of adventure activities on land, sea and air" over the last three years. The lifetime achievement is awarded to individuals who have demonstrated excellence and have devoted themselves in the promotion of adventure sports. As of 2020, the award comprises "a bronze statuette of Tenzing Norgay along with a cash prize of ₹15 lakh (US$16,000)."

Instituted in 1993–1994, the first awards were given for the year 1994. The status of this award is considered to be equivalent to the Arjuna Award conferred in the field of sport. Since the year 2004, this award along with all the other six National Sports Awards are conferred in the same presidential ceremony at the Rashtrapati Bhavan usually on 29 August each year. The nominations for a given year are accepted till 20 June. Typically one award in each of the four categories: Land adventure, Water (Sea) adventure, Air adventure and Lifetime achievement are given. The number may increase in a particular year for appropriate reasons and after approval. A five-member committee evaluates the achievements of a person in a particular category of adventure taking into consideration their last three years of performance for the first three categories. The committee later submits their recommendations to the Union Minister of Youth Affairs and Sports for further approval.

As of 2020, there have been one hundred and thirty-nine recipients. In the first year 1994, twenty-two awards were given, out of which nineteen were given to the Indian members of the 1993 Indo-Nepalese Women's Everest Expedition. In 2017, ten awards were given, out of which six were given to the members of Navika Sagar Parikrama, an all-woman sailing team for the circumnavigation of the globe. Chandraprabha Aitwal is the only double recipient of the award, once in 1994 for land adventure and second time in 2009 for lifetime achievement.

== History ==
Before the creation of this award, the Arjuna award was given for outstanding performance in the field of adventure. Ten individual and one team Arjuna awards were given in the years 1965 to 1986 in the field of either mountaineering or adventure sports. The first and only team Arjuna award to date was presented in 1965 to the twenty mountaineers of the successful Indian Everest expedition of 1965. Individually, four mountaineers in 1981, two mountaineers in 1984 including Bachendri Pal, India's first woman to scale Mount Everest, and three adventurers in 1986 were awarded the Arjuna award.

In 1993, the Union Minister of State for Youth Affairs and Sports, Mukul Wasnik announced the creation of a separate National Adventure Awards which was to be instituted as the "highest national recognition for outstanding achievement in the field of adventure activities on land, sea and air." Since its inception, it has been considered on par with Arjuna awards matching the same cash prize money. The award is given in four categories; land, water, air and lifetime achievement. They were first presented in 1995 for the awarding year of 1994. They are considered the highest honour in the field of adventure sports in India. The awards were presented simultaneously in 2001 for the awarding years of 1997 and 1998, in 2003 for the awarding years of 1999, 2000 and 2001, and in 2005 for the awarding years of 2003 and 2004. In 2003 the awards were renamed after Tenzing Norgay, a Nepali-Indian Sherpa mountaineer and one of the first two individuals to reach the summit of Mount Everest along with Edmund Hillary in 1953, commemorating the golden jubilee of his first scaling of Everest. Since the awarding year of 2002, the national adventure awards are presented along with all the other National Sports Awards in the same presidential ceremony at the Rashtrapati Bhavan. The cash prize started with ₹50,000 (US$530) in 1994, was revised to ₹1.5 lakh (US$1,600) in 1999, to ₹3 lakh (US$3,200) in 2002, and to ₹5 lakh (US$5,300) in 2008. The award statuette was redesigned in 2009, measuring 15 inches (38 cm) in height and weighing nearly 1.5 kilograms (3.3 lb). It is made of bronze and polished to highlight the age of Tenzing Norgay along with the ice axe he used when climbing Everest. As of 2020, the award comprises "a bronze statuette of Tenzing Norgay, certificate, blazer with silken tie/saree, and a cash prize of ₹5 lakh (US$5,300)."

== Nominations ==
The nominations for the award are filled through an online application form. The provision for giving away award posthumously exists however no award can be given to the same person in the same category more than once. The application has to be either recommended by the Youth or Sports Department of the State Governments or by recognized adventure institutes representing the specific category in which application is made. The application can also be recommended by the Adventure Promotion Cell of various Indian Armed Forces, Indo-Tibetan Border Police or other paramilitary forces. All the serving personnel in the Armed Forces: Army, Navy and Air Force have to be recommended directly through their Directorate or adventure cells. The Ministry of Youth Affairs and Sports can also seek nominations from different organizations and nominate on its own. The nominations in a particular year are accepted till 20 June. The recognized institutes in the land adventure category are Indian Mountaineering Foundation, Himalayan Mountaineering Institute and Jawahar Institute of Mountaineering and Winter Sports, in the water (sea) adventure category is National Institute of Water Sports and in the air adventure category is Aero Club of India.

== Selection process ==
All the nominations are sent to the three umbrella bodies in their respective categories: Indian Mountaineering Foundation for land, National Institute of Water Sports for water, and Aero Club of India for air. These bodies verify the achievements of the applicants and confirm from their official records, within a month of the receipt of the nominations. The achievements of the last three calendar years are taken into account for all the categories except for lifetime achievement.

The valid nominations are vetted and scrutinized by the selection committee constituted by the Government. This five member committee consists of a chairperson, usually the Secretary of Youth Affairs, Joint Secretary of Youth Affairs and one representative from each of three categories: land, water (sea) and air. The recommendations of the selection committee are submitted to the Union Minister of Youth Affairs and Sports for further approval. The provision is usually just for one award in each category but the Ministry with the approval of the Minister may increase the awardees in a particular year.

The recipients are selected by a committee and are honoured for their "excellent performance, outstanding qualities of leadership, sense of adventure discipline and continuous achievement in one particular field of adventure viz. Land, Air or Water (Sea)" over the last three years. The lifetime achievement award is bestowed to recipients who "besides individual excellence have devoted themselves to the cause of promotion of adventure."

== Recipients ==
Award recipients by year
Year	Number of recipients
1994–1999	45
2000–2009	38
2010–2019	56

Award recipients by gender (Note: The names and complete data of four award recipients is missing, two recipients from 1997 and two from 1998. The partial data for three recipients is missing, Lalneihsenga (1996) – discipline missing, Ratnamani Roy (1999) – gender, category and discipline missing and Chalti Debarma (2000) – gender, category and discipline missing. Hence the total in the graphs may not match the total number of recipients.)
Gender	Number of recipients
Male	89
Female	44

Award recipients by category
Category	Number of recipients
Land Adventure	63
Water Adventure	26
Air Adventure	17
Lifetime Achievement	28

Award recipients by discipline
Category	Number of recipients
Mountaineering	83
Open water swimming	14
Sailing	12
Skydiving	16
Others (Note: Includes caving (1 recipient), cross-country skiing (1 recipient), hang gliding (2 recipients), microlight aviation (2 recipients) and white water rafting (1 recipient))	7

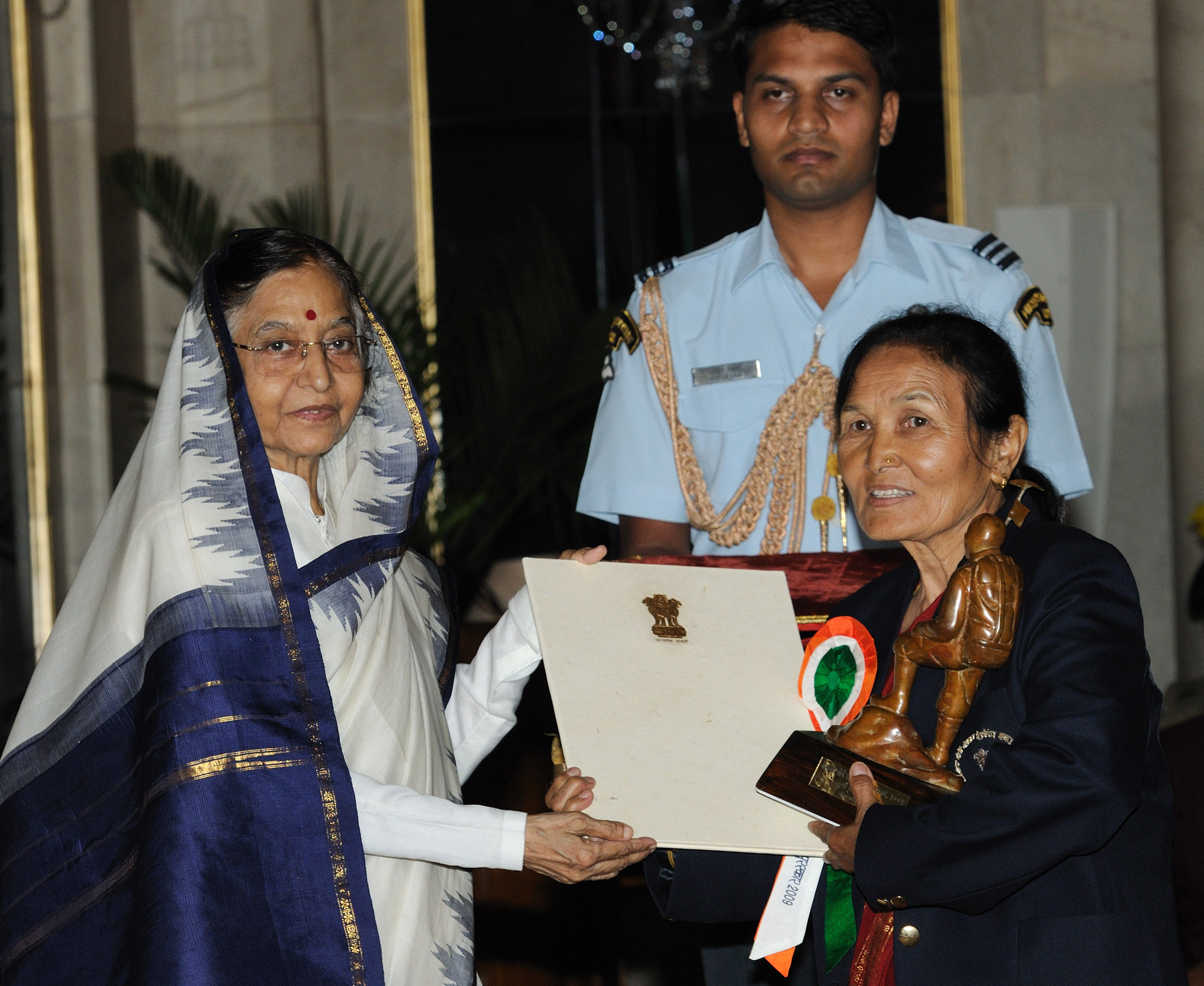
Chandraprabha Aitwal receiving lifetime achievement award in 2009

Broadly the awards in the land adventure category have been given to mountaineering, in the water adventure category to open water swimming and sailing, and in the air adventure category to skydiving. The exceptions include caving, cross-country skiing including Reena Kaushal Dharmshaktu, the first Indian woman to ski to the South Pole, hang gliding, microlight aviation including businessman Vijaypat Singhania, the pilot of world record-setting flight from the UK to India, and white water rafting.

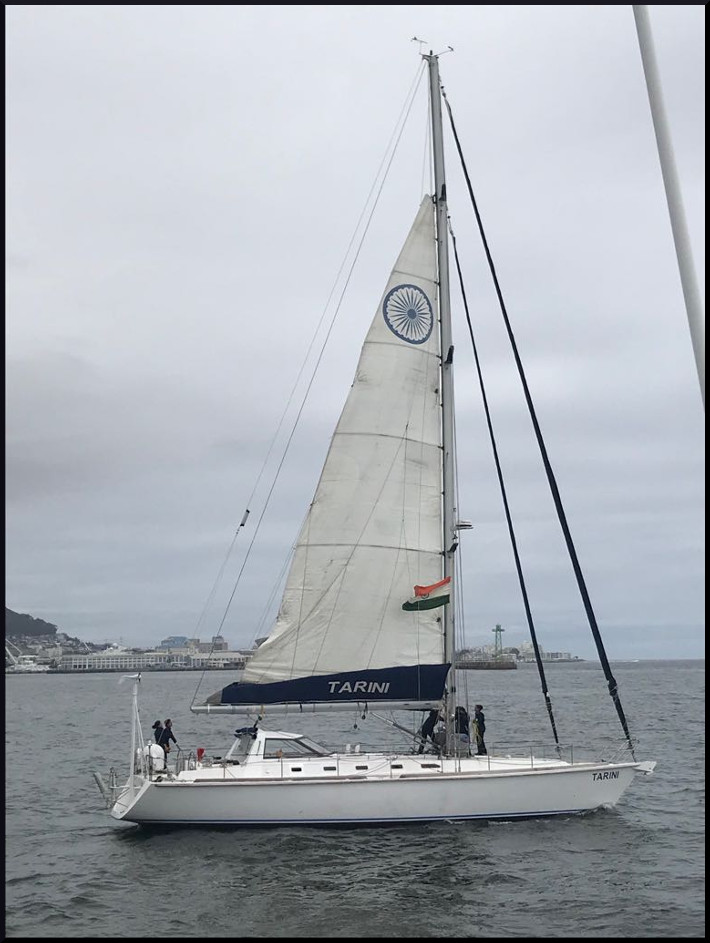
INSV Tarini with members of Navika Sagar Parikrama leaving Cape Town

Usually, the award is conferred upon three to six people in a year, a few exceptions have been made in the years 1994, 1995, 2017 and 2019, when more than six recipients were awarded in a year. In its initial year, twenty-two awards were presented, the highest so far for a single year. Nineteen of these awards were given to the 1993 Indo-Nepalese Women's Everest Expedition led by Bachendri Pal. The expedition created four world records at the time including the largest number of mountaineers (eighteen) from a single expedition and the largest number of women (seven) from a single country to scale Everest. In 2017, ten awards were presented, out of which six were given to the members of Navika Sagar Parikrama (circumnavigation of the globe). They were an all women Indian Navy officers sailing team for the circumnavigation of the globe, on board the Indian Navy Sailing Vessel Tarini (pictured), led by Lieutenant Commander Vartika Joshi. Chandraprabha Aitwal (pictured) is the only double recipient of the award, once in 1994 in the category of land adventure for being part of the 1993 Indo-Nepalese Women's Everest Expedition and the second time in 2009 in the category of lifetime achievement in the discipline of mountaineering. Before this award was introduced, the Arjuna award was also given for adventure sports and mountaineering; eight people have won both awards. Five expedition members of India's first successful bid to Mount Everest in 1965, Nawang Gombu, Gurdial Singh, Mohan Singh Kohli, H. P. S. Ahluwalia and Sonam Wangyal were awarded the lifetime achievement awards in 2005, 2006, 2007, 2008, and 2017 respectively. They were all awarded the team Arjuna award in 1965. Bula Choudhury was awarded the Arjuna award in 1990 in the field of swimming and was presented with the adventure award in 2002 for lifetime achievement in the discipline of open water swimming.

Over the years, a number of firsts and records in the adventure activities have been awarded. In the field of mountaineering, Love Raj Singh Dharmshaktu (awarded in 1999) has gone on to climb Everest seven times, the highest for an Indian. Arunima Sinha (awarded in 2014) became the world's first female amputee to scale Everest. Twins Tashi and Nungshi Malik (awarded in 2015) became the first twins in the world to complete Seven Summits and Explorers Grand Slam. Anshu Jamsenpa (awarded in 2017) is the fastest female double summiteer of Everest, doing so in five days. In the field of sailing, Dilip Donde (awarded in 2010) became the first Indian to circumnavigate the globe under sail solo and unassisted. Abhilash Tomy (awarded in 2012) bettered the record by being the first Indian to do it non-stop. In the field of skydiving, Rachel Thomas (awarded in 1994) became India's first female skydiver and Shital Mahajan (awarded in 2005) was the youngest woman to jump over both the poles. The award for lifetime achievement for year 2023 was awarded to Umesh Zirpe, for leading eight successful expeditions to eight 8000 m high mountains and for dedicating his life for mountaineering.

== Controversies ==
The initial publication on 21 August 2020 of the 2019 awardees list had the name of mountaineer Narender Singh Yadav in the category of land adventure. His name in the list of awardees created controversy in the mountaineering circles in India and abroad. On 23 August, the Katmandu-based daily Kantipur published the photo that Singh had submitted to the authorities in Nepal as proof of reaching the Everest summit in 2016. The article explained how the photo in question was morphed. Several mountaineers pointed out the inaccuracies in the photo including the oxygen mask not having a pipe, no reflections on his sunglasses, flags he carried being still despite the high winds, no headlamps on his head and him wearing a helmet which is not worn by climbers on their summit day. His team leader Naba Kumar Phukon, rescue team member Lakhpa Sherpa and senior mountaineer Debashis Biswas attested to the fact that Singh never made it to the top of Everest and had to be helped down after getting stranded at the Balcony at 8,400 m (27,600 ft). Tenzing Norgay's son Jamling Norgay took up the matter and raised the issue with Indian Mountaineering Foundation. Soon after that, the Sports Ministry opened a probe into the claims, withholding the award on 28 August and in the list of awardees attending next day's ceremony, Singh's name was omitted. Jamling Norgay and Bachendri Pal expressed displeasure that such a person was even considered for the award in the first place. Jamling further noted that the awards should not be simply awarded to the Everest climbers, but to those who inspire other adventure seekers by scaling new peaks, exploring new routes and promoting adventure in general.
