= List of The Doon School alumni =

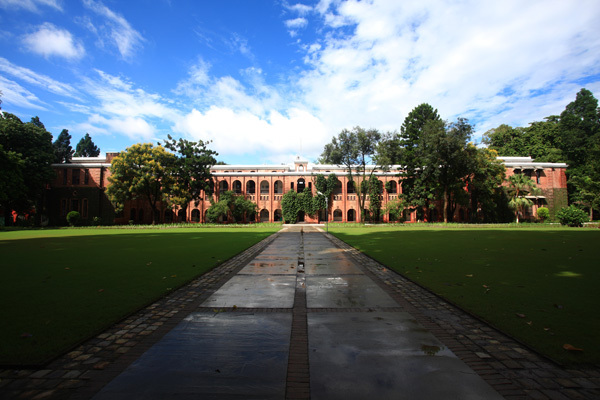
Main Building of The Doon School

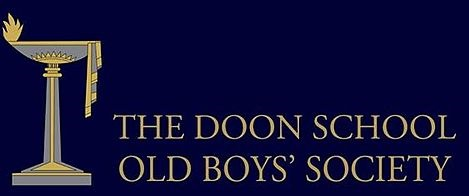
The Doon School Old Boys' Society is the alumni association, and students become members upon graduation.

The Doon School is a boys-only academically selective boarding school in Dehradun, Uttarakhand, India, founded in 1935 by Satish Ranjan Das The school's first headmaster was Arthur E. Foot, who had spent some nine years as a science master at Eton College, England. The old boys of Doon are known as Doscos, and the alumni body is represented by The Doon School Old Boys' Society. Admission to the school is based on a competitive entrance examination and an interview.

Doon remains a boys-only school despite continued pressure from political leaders to become coeducational. However, girls are admitted in case they are daughters of the school staff (see entries for sculptor Latika Katt and actor Himani Shivpuri). Although the total number of Doscos is relatively small (estimated at 5,000 since the school was founded in 1935), they include some of India's prominent politicians, artists, writers, social activists and businesspeople.

Abbreviations used in the following tables

- DNG – Did not graduate
- ? – Class year unknown

Note: The sub-headings are given as a general guide and some names might fit under more than one category

== Government ==
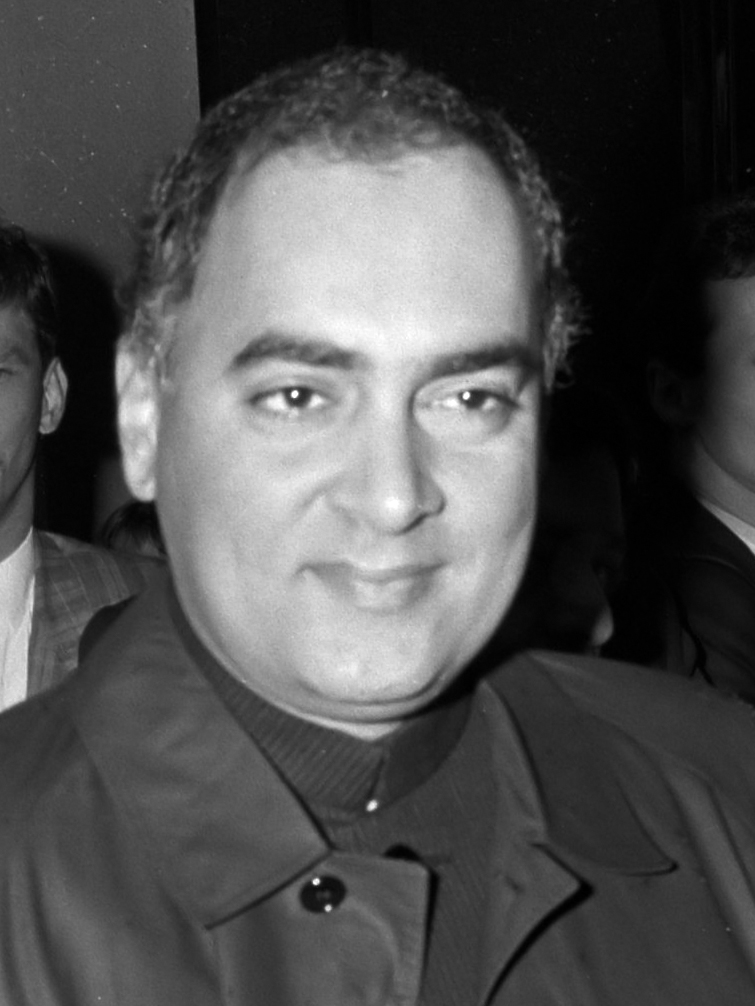
Rajiv Gandhi, 6th Prime Minister of India (Class of '62)

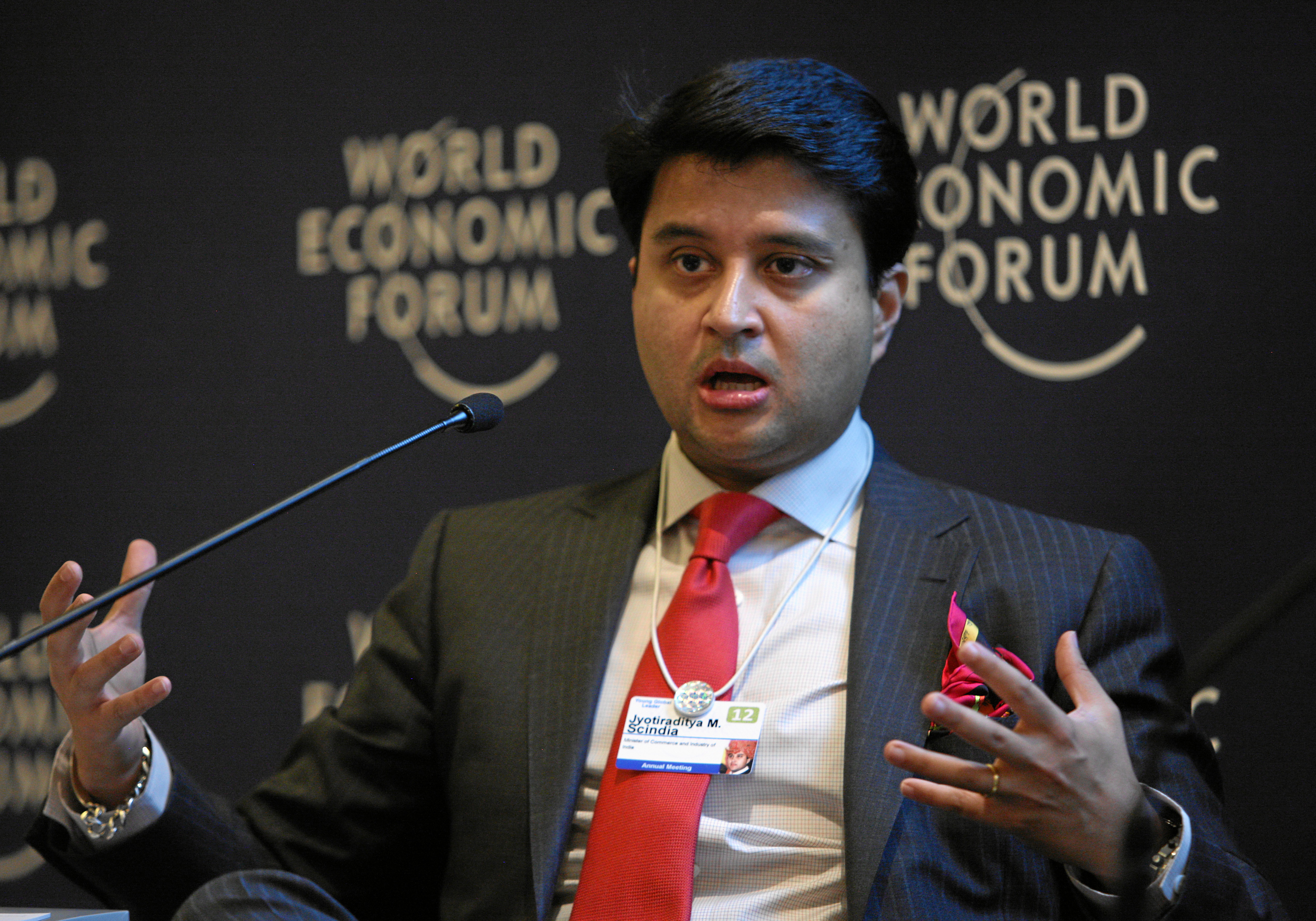
Jyotiraditya Scindia, Member of Parliament and Minister of Information (Class of '89)

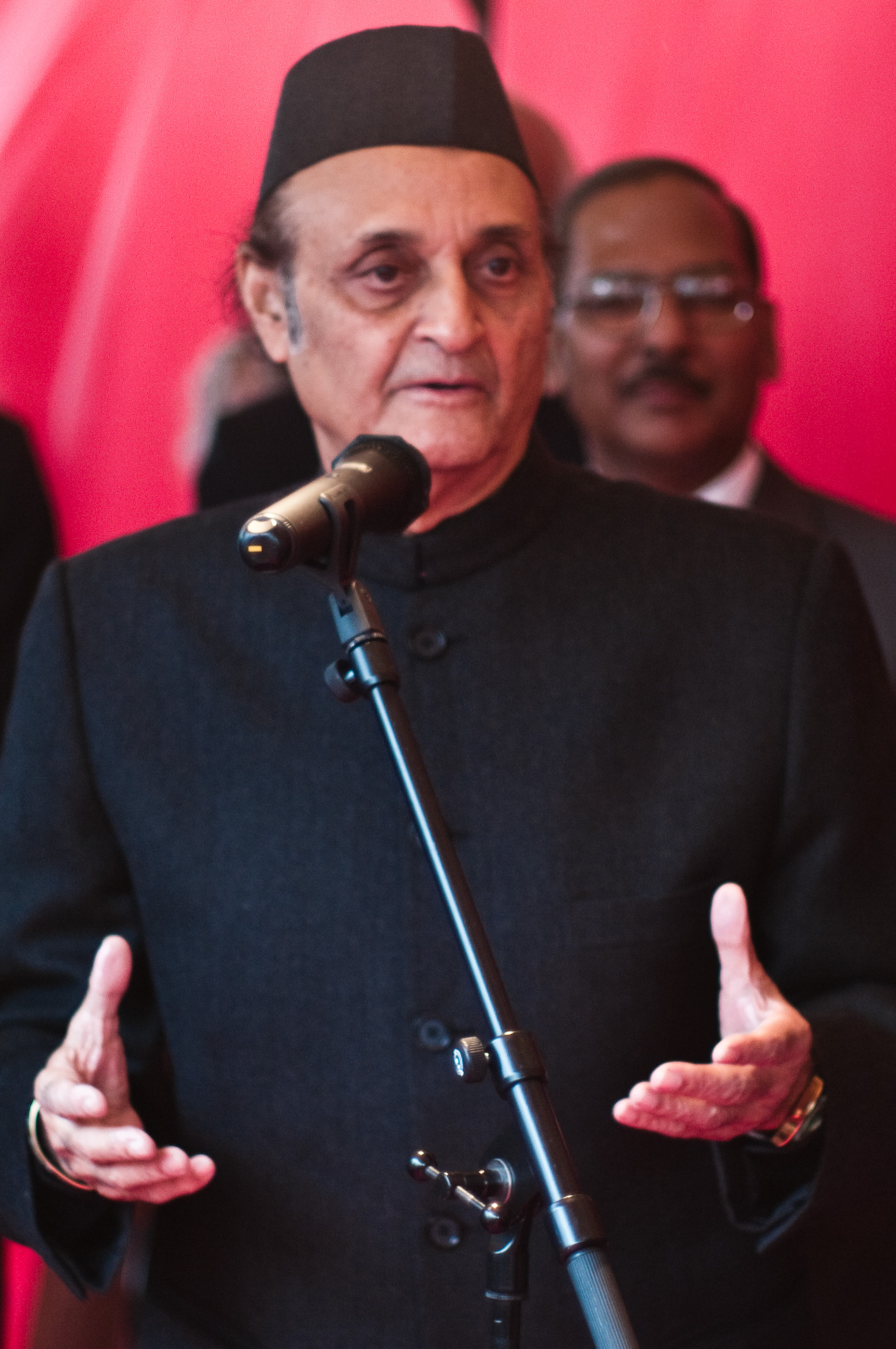
Karan Singh, Politician and Diplomat (Class of '49)

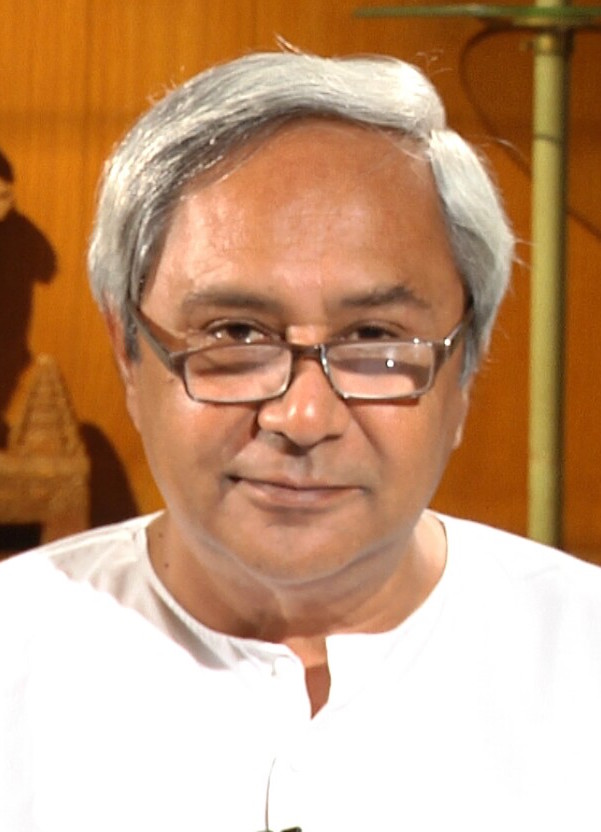
Naveen Patnaik, Former Chief Minister of Odisha (Class of '64)

=== Prime minister ===
Name	Class year	Notability	Reference(s)
Rajiv Gandhi	1962	6th Prime Minister of India	

=== Cabinet Ministers ===
Name	Class year	Notability	Reference(s)
Mani Shankar Aiyar	1958	Minister of Panchayati Raj, Minister of Youth Affairs and Sports	
Jitin Prasada	1991	Minister of State for Ministry of Petroleum and Natural Gas	
Jyotiraditya Scindia	1989	Minister of State for Ministry of Commerce and Industry, from Madhya Pradesh	
Arun Singh	1960	Minister of State for Ministry of Defence	
C.P.N Singh	1952	Minister of State for Ministry of Defence	
Dinesh Singh	1943	Foreign Minister & Commerce Minister	
Karan Singh	1949	Rajya Sabha member, Former Indian Ambassador to the United States	
R.P.N. Singh	1982	Minister for Road Transport and Highways	

=== Chief Ministers ===
Name	Class year	Notability	Reference(s)
Naveen Patnaik	1964	Former Chief Minister of Odisha, earlier Lok Sabha member and cabinet minister	
Amarinder Singh	1960	former Chief Minister of Punjab, also Lok Sabha member	
Kamal Nath	1964	former Chief Minister of Madhya Pradesh, Lok Sabha member	
Lt. Gen. Ghulam Jilani Khan	1943	Governor of Punjab, Pakistan	

=== Members of Parliament and Legislative Assemblies ===
Name	Class year	Notability	Reference(s)
Rahul Gandhi	1983	Member of Parliament, President of the Indian National Congress	
Akbar Ahmad	1966	Member of Parliament	
Kalikesh Singh Deo	1992	Member of Biju Janata Dal, MLA and later Lok Sabha member from Orissa	
Sanjay Gandhi	1964 (DNG)	Lok Sabha member from Uttar Pradesh	
Piloo Mody	1944	Member of Parliament, Lok Sabha from Gujarat	
Dushyant Singh	1991	Member of Parliament, Lok Sabha from Rajasthan	
Vishvjit Singh	1964	Member of Parliament, Rajya Sabha	
Manpreet Singh Badal	1981	Founder of People's Party of Punjab	
Adesh Kanwarjit Singh Brar	1966	MLA from Punjab Muktsar	
Ananga Udaya Singh Deo	1963	Orissa Minister for Steel & Tourism, also Rajya Sabha member	
Adesh Pratap Singh Kairon	1974	former Minister for Excise and Taxation	
Uday Pratap Singh	1977	MLA from Uttar Pradesh	
Murtaza Ali Khan	1942	MLA from Uttar Pradesh	
Gajendra Singh Khimsar	1974	Rajasthan Minister of Power	
Chandra Vijay Singh	1964	Member of the Lok Sabha	
Saurabh Narain Singh	1993	MLA from Jharkhand	
Nakul Nath	1992	Member of the Lok Sabha	
Raninder Singh	1982	Member of the Indian National Congress	
Jaivardhan Singh	2004	Member of the 14th State Legislative Assembly, Government of Madhya Pradesh	

=== Diplomats and Bureaucrats ===
Name	Class year	Notability	Reference(s)
Wajahat Habibullah	1969	Civil servant	
Parameswaran Iyer	1977	Civil servant; led the Swachh Bharat Mission	
Uma Shankar Bajpai	1936	Foreign Secretary, Ambassador to Canada	
Vinod Kumar Grover	1953	Foreign Secretary, Ambassador to Netherlands	
Inder Pal Khosla	1954	Foreign Secretary, Ambassador to Afghanistan	
Dalip Mehta	1958	Foreign Secretary, Ambassador to Bhutan and Turkmenistan	
Nagendra Nath Jha	1964	Lieutenant Governor of Andaman and Nicobar Islands, Ambassador to Ireland and Turkey	
Aftab Seth	1959	Ambassador to Japan, Vietnam and Micronesia	
Jamsheed Marker	1940	Pakistan's Ambassador to nineteen countries	
Vinay Sheel Oberoi	1972	IAS officer; Secretary, Department of Higher Education, Ministry of Human Resource Development	
Khursheed Marker	1941	Minister of Water and Power, Pakistan	
Abhinav Kumar	1991	IPS Officer, Director General of Police- Uttarakhand, India	

=== Communist Activist ===
Name	Class year	Notability	Reference(s)
Kobad Ghandy	1969	Communist activist	

=== Law ===
Name	Class year	Notability	Reference(s)
Brahma Nath Katju	1942	Chief Justice of the Allahabad High Court	

== Armed forces ==
Name	Class year	Notability	Reference(s)
Lakshman Katre	1944	Air Chief Marshal, Chief of Air Staff	
Biddanda Chengappa Nanda	1949	Lieutenant General	
Brijesh Dhar Jayal	1953	Air Marshal	
Trilochan Singh Brar	1943	Air Marshal, Vice Chief of Air Staff	
FN Billimoria	1952	Lieutenant General	
Kuldip Singh Brar	1954	Lieutenant General	
Adi M. Sethna	1942	Lieutenant General	
Deepak Summanwar	1963	Lieutenant General	
Sukhjit Singh	1949	Brigadier, Maha Vir Chakra	
Bhawani Singh	1949	Brigadier, Maha Vir Chakra	

== Business ==
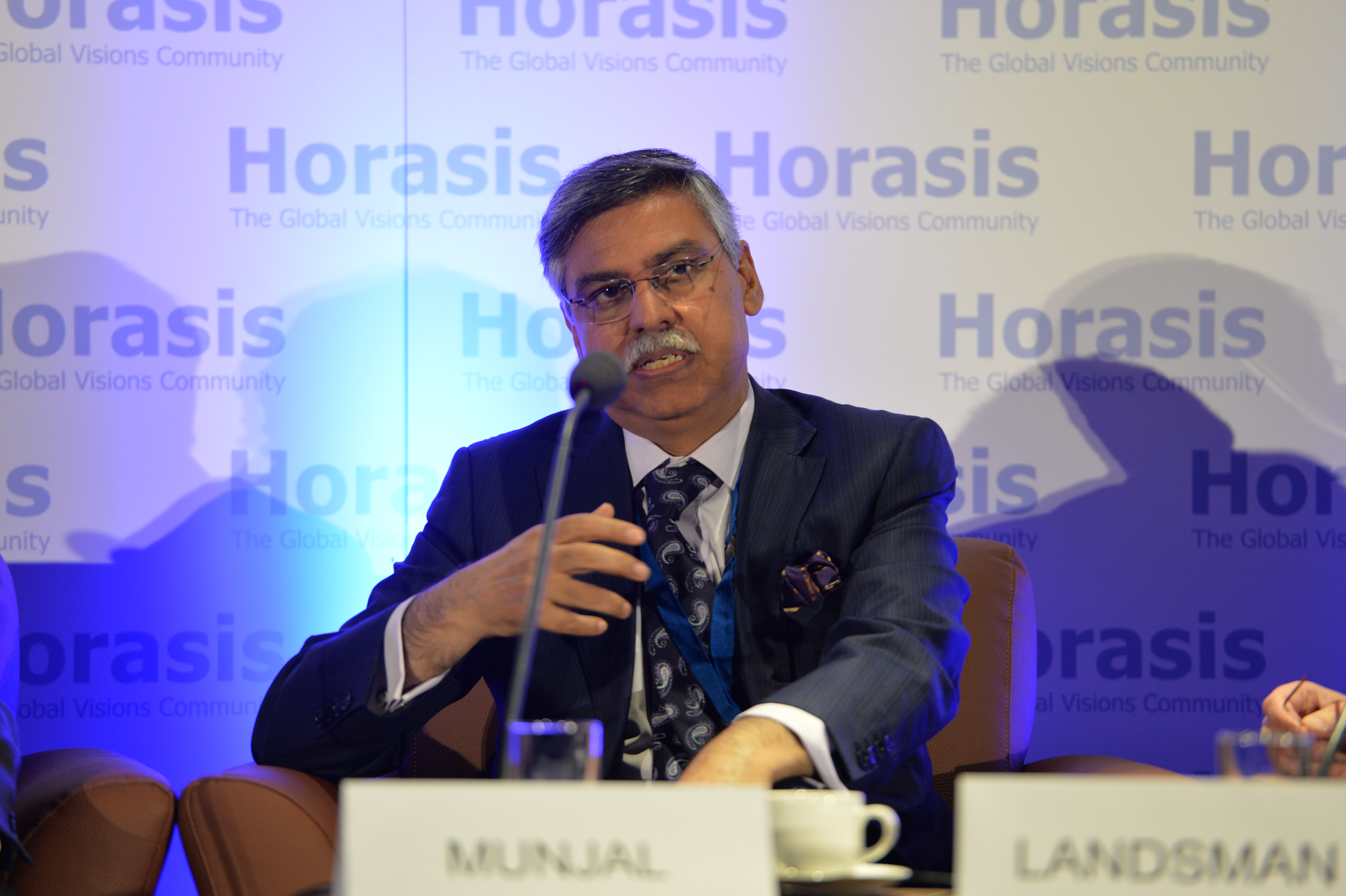
Sunil Kant Munjal, managing director of Hero MotoCorp (Class of '73)

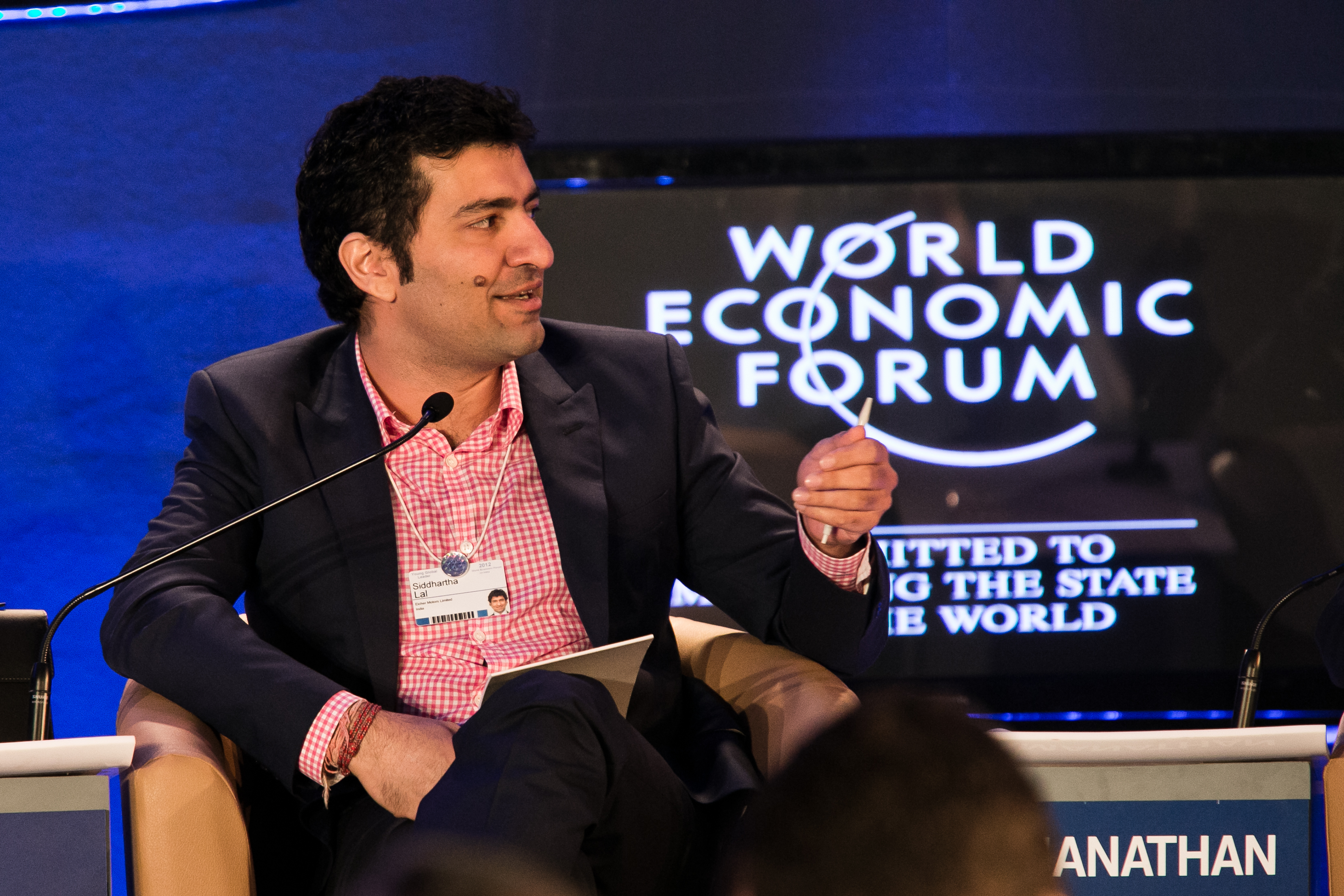
Siddhartha Lal, CEO and MD of Eicher Motors (Class of '91)

Name	Class year	Notability	Reference(s)
Ishaat Hussain	1963	former director of Tata Sons	
Rajiv Dutta	1976	Chief financial officer, eBay and president, Skype	
Ajit Narain Haksar	1943	Chairman ITC Limited	
Anil Kumar	1976	Director, McKinsey	
Vikram Lal	1970	Chairman, Eicher Group	
Siddhartha Lal	1991	CEO, Eicher Motors	
Vittal Mallya	1939	Chairman, United Breweries Limited, Hoechst AG	
M. Ct. Muthiah	1968	Director of Indian Overseas Bank	
Sunil Kant Munjal	1973	MD, Hero MotoCorp, Confederation of Indian Industry	
Nikhil Nanda	1970	Head, Escorts	
Mhd. Rafique Saigol	1949	Chairman, Pakistan International Airlines	
Analjit Singh	1971	Chairman, Max Healthcare, Vodafone India; founder member, Indian School of Business	
Malvinder Mohan Singh	1982	Executive chairman of Fortis Healthcare and former CEO & MD of Ranbaxy	
Shivinder Mohan Singh	1983	MD, Fortis Healthcare	
Gautam Thapar	1976	Chairman, Avantha Group	
L. M. Thapar	1952	Chairman, Ballarpur Industries Limited	
A. Vellayan	1976	Chairman, Murugappa Group	
R. C. Bhargava	1949	IAS officer, later CEO, Maruti Suzuki	
Samir Modi	1988	Director of Modi Enterprises; Founder of 24Seven convenience stores	
Sharan Pasricha	1998	CEO of Ennismore Hospitality, founder of The Hoxton and Gleneagles	
Rituraj Kishore Sinha	1999	Managing Director SIS Limited	

== Journalism ==
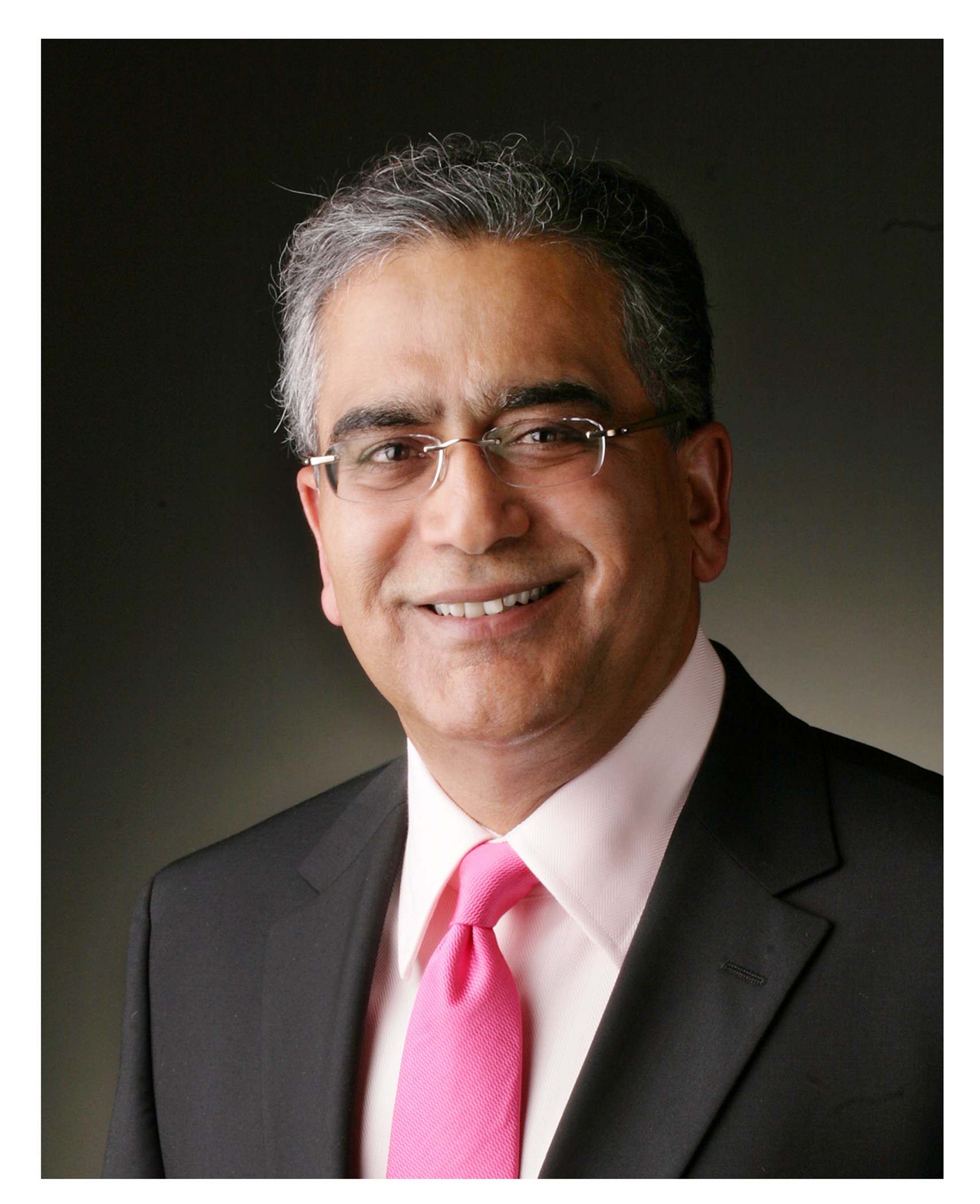
Aroon Purie, editor-in-chief of India Today (Class of '62)

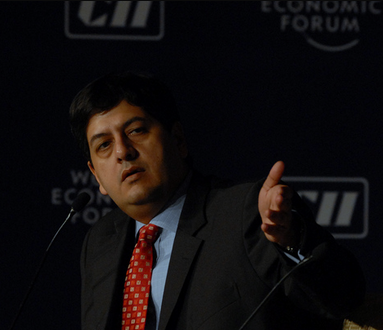
Vikram Chandra CEO of NDTV (Class of '85)

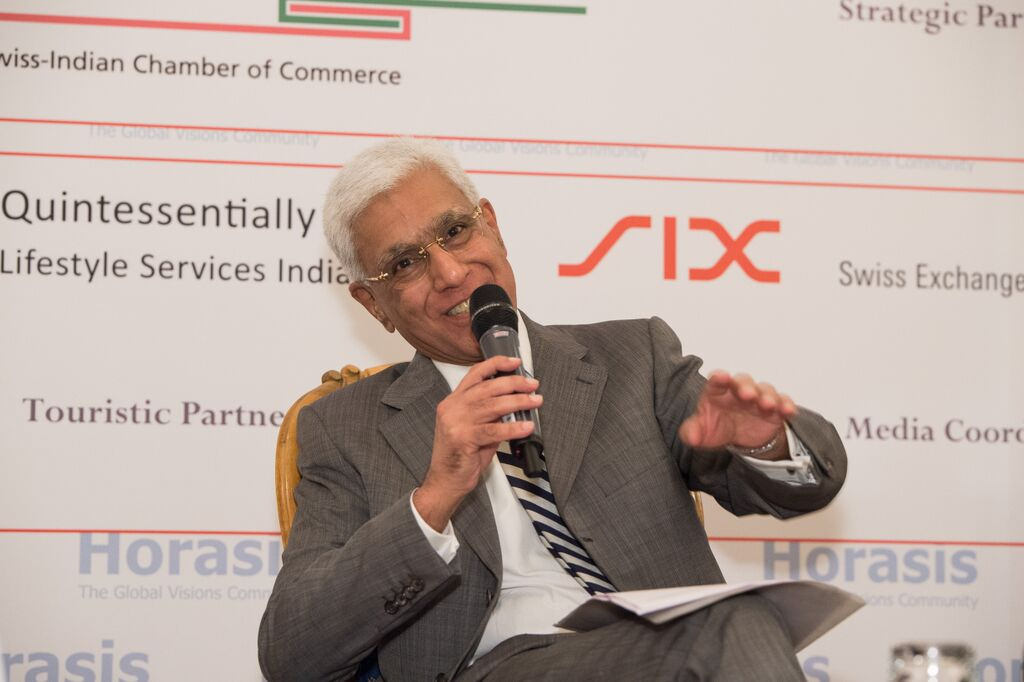
Karan Thapar, Journalist (Class of '71)

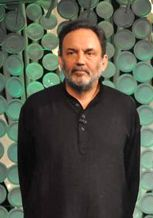
Prannoy Roy, founder of NDTV (Class of '66)

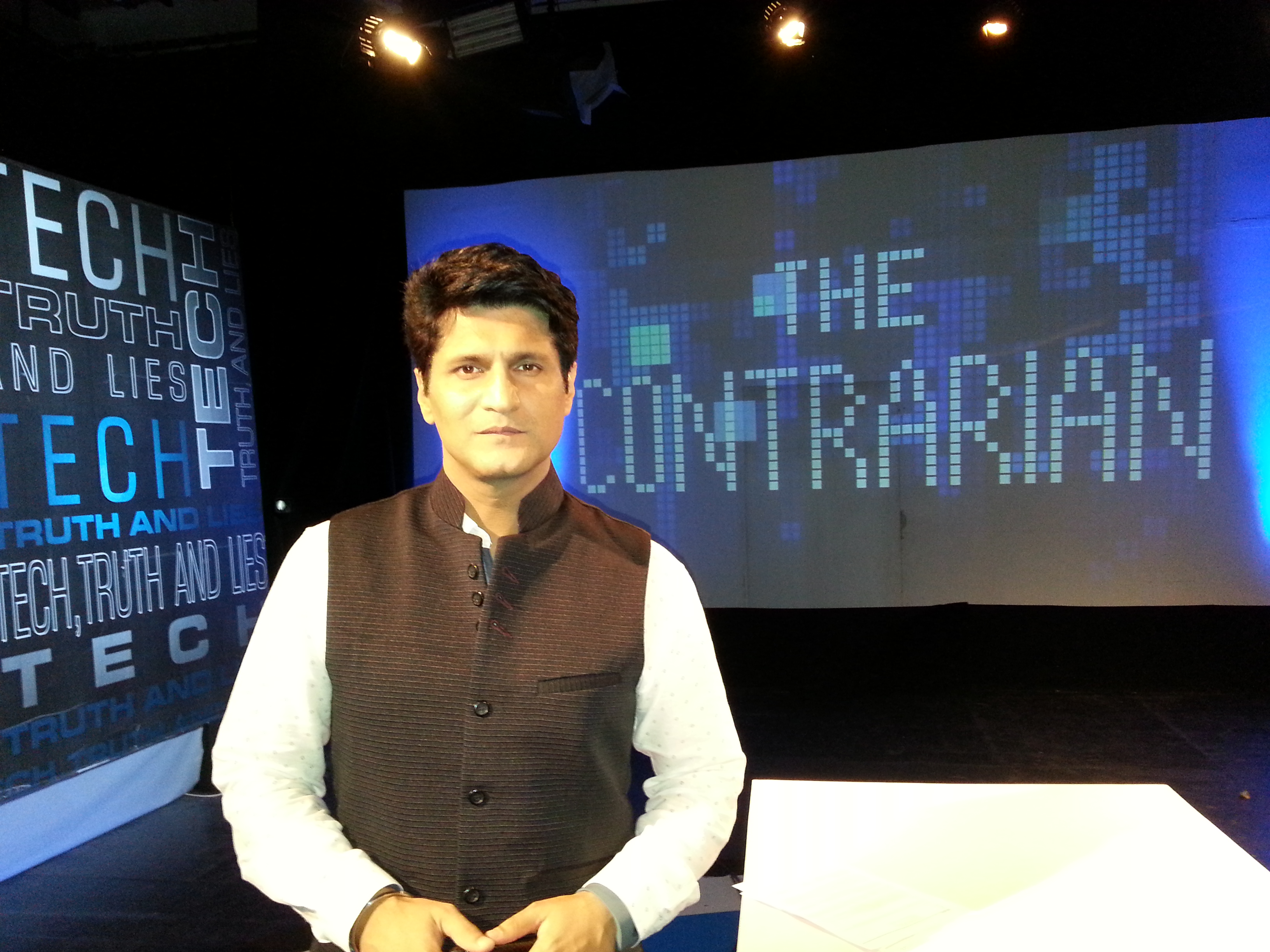
Rajiv Makhni, Technology journalist (Class of '84)

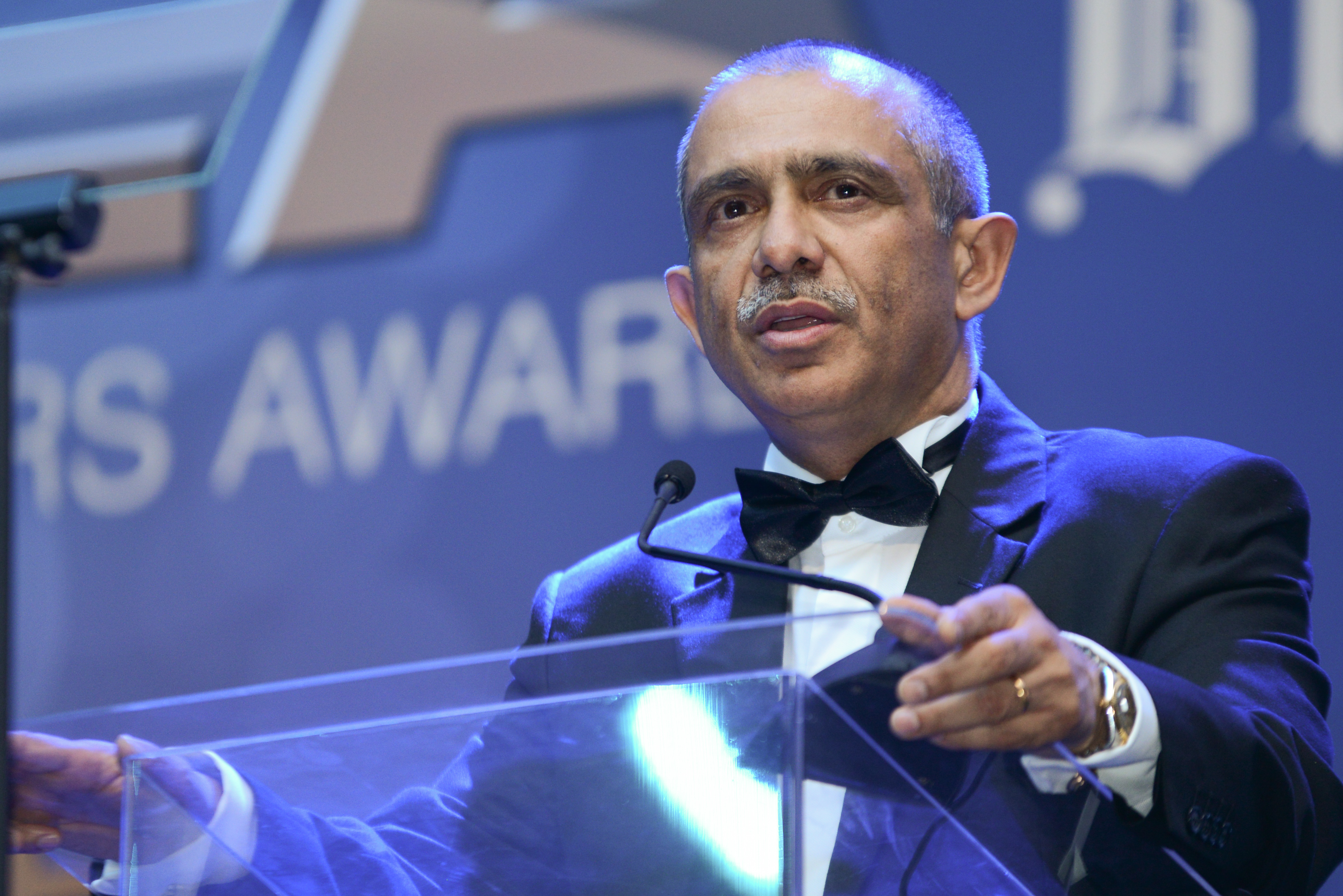
Rakesh Wahi, founder of CNBC Africa (Class of '75)

Name	Class year	Notability	Reference(s)
Swaminathan Aiyar	1960	Editor of Financial Express, The Times of India, correspondent for The Economist	
Inderjit Badhwar	1969	Executive editor of India Today, writer	
Vikramaditya Chandra	1985	CEO, NDTV	
Prem Shankar Jha	1965	Editor of Hindustan Times, The Economic Times and The Financial Express	
Peter Mukerjea	1971	former CEO, STAR TV	
Aroon Purie	1960	Founder of the India Today Group	
Prannoy Roy	1964	Founder of NDTV	
Tejeshwar Singh	1965	Publisher and Newscaster	
Karan Thapar	1971	Broadcaster, Journalist - CNBC & CNN-IBN	
Rakesh Wahi	1975	Founder - CNBC Africa & Forbes Africa	
B G Verghese	1958	Editor of the Times of India, Magsaysay Award winner	
Abhinandan Sekhri	1992	CEO of Newslaundry	

== Literature ==
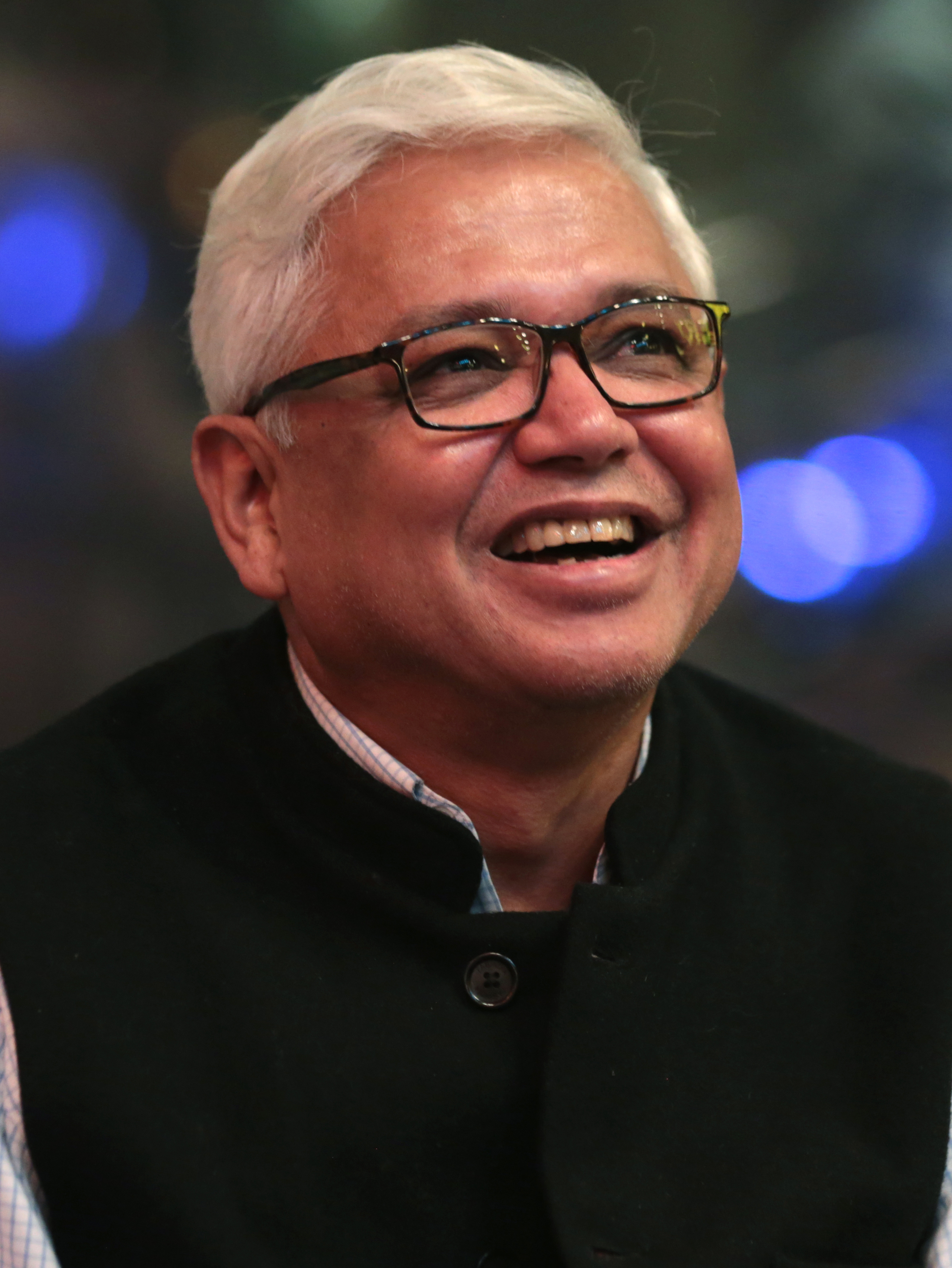
Amitav Ghosh, Novelist (Class of '72)

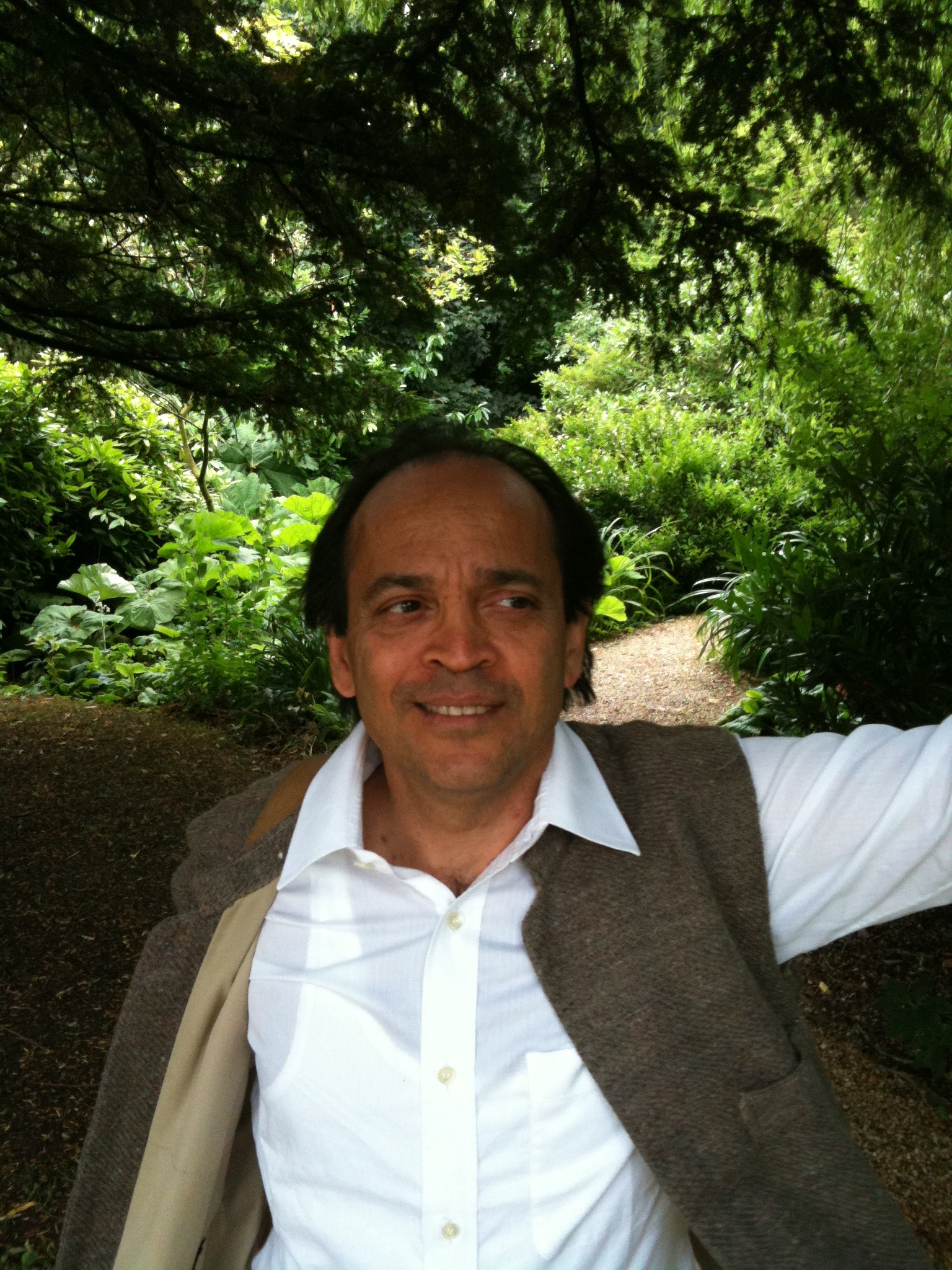
Vikram Seth, Novelist (Class of '69)

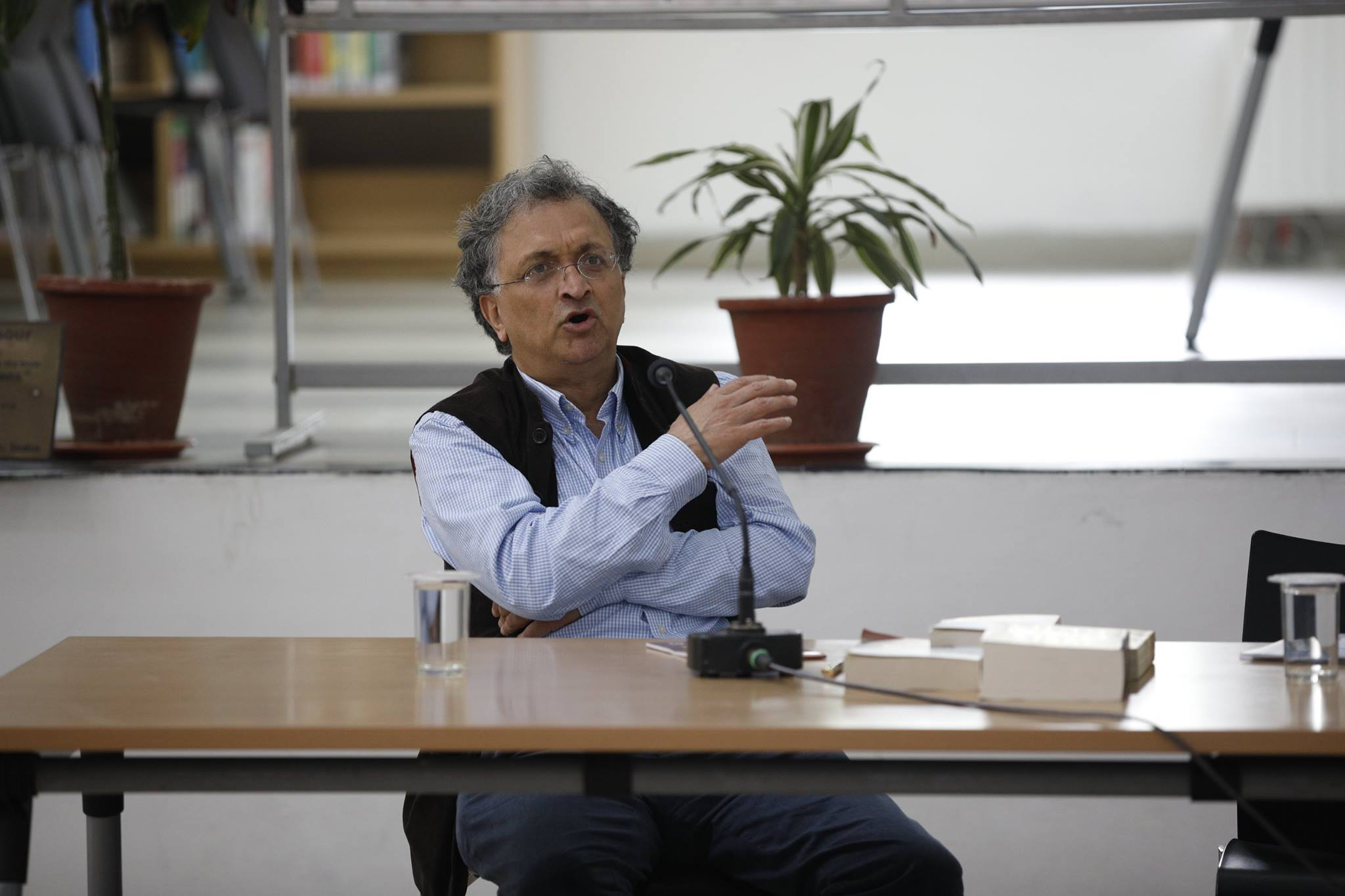
Ramachandra Guha, Historian and non-fiction writer (Class of '73)

=== Non-fiction ===
Name	Class year	Notability	Reference(s)
Shyam Bhatia	1967	Writer (Goodbye Shahzadi, Bullets and Bylines, Brighter Than The Baghdad Sun, "Nuclear Rivals in the Middle East)	
Pushpindar Singh Chopra	1959	Writer (Touching the Sky) and various other books about aviation and military history. Founder Vayu Aerospace and Defence Review.	
Mahmood Farooqui	1990	Writer, Artist (Besieged: Voices From Delhi 1857)	
Ramachandra Guha	1973	Historian, Writer (India after Gandhi)	
A. N. D. Haksar	1950	Writer, Scholar, Translator of Sanskrit texts	
Shiv Kunal Verma	1976	Writer (The Long Road to Siachen: The Question Why and The Northeast Trilogy)	
B G Verghese	1958	Writer, Journalist (Agenda for India)	
Amardeep Singh (independent researcher)	1986	Filmmaker, Writer (Lost Heritage: The Sikh Legacy In Pakistan and The Quest Continues: Lost Heritage - The Sikh Legacy In Pakistan)	

=== Fiction, poetry and drama ===
Name	Class year	Notability	Reference(s)
Vikramaditya Chandra	1983	Writer (The Srinagar Conspiracy)	
Amitav Ghosh	1972	Writer, Ibis trilogy and The Great Derangement: Climate Change and the Unthinkable	
Vikram Seth	1969	Writer, Poet (The Golden Gate, A Suitable Boy)	
Vishvjit Singh	1964	Writer (Kuch Shabd Kuch Lakeerein)	
Ardashir Vakil	1978	Writer (Beach Boy)	

== Education ==
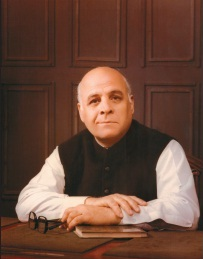
Ghulam Jilani Khan, founder of Chand Bagh School and former Defence Secretary of Pakistan (Class of '43)

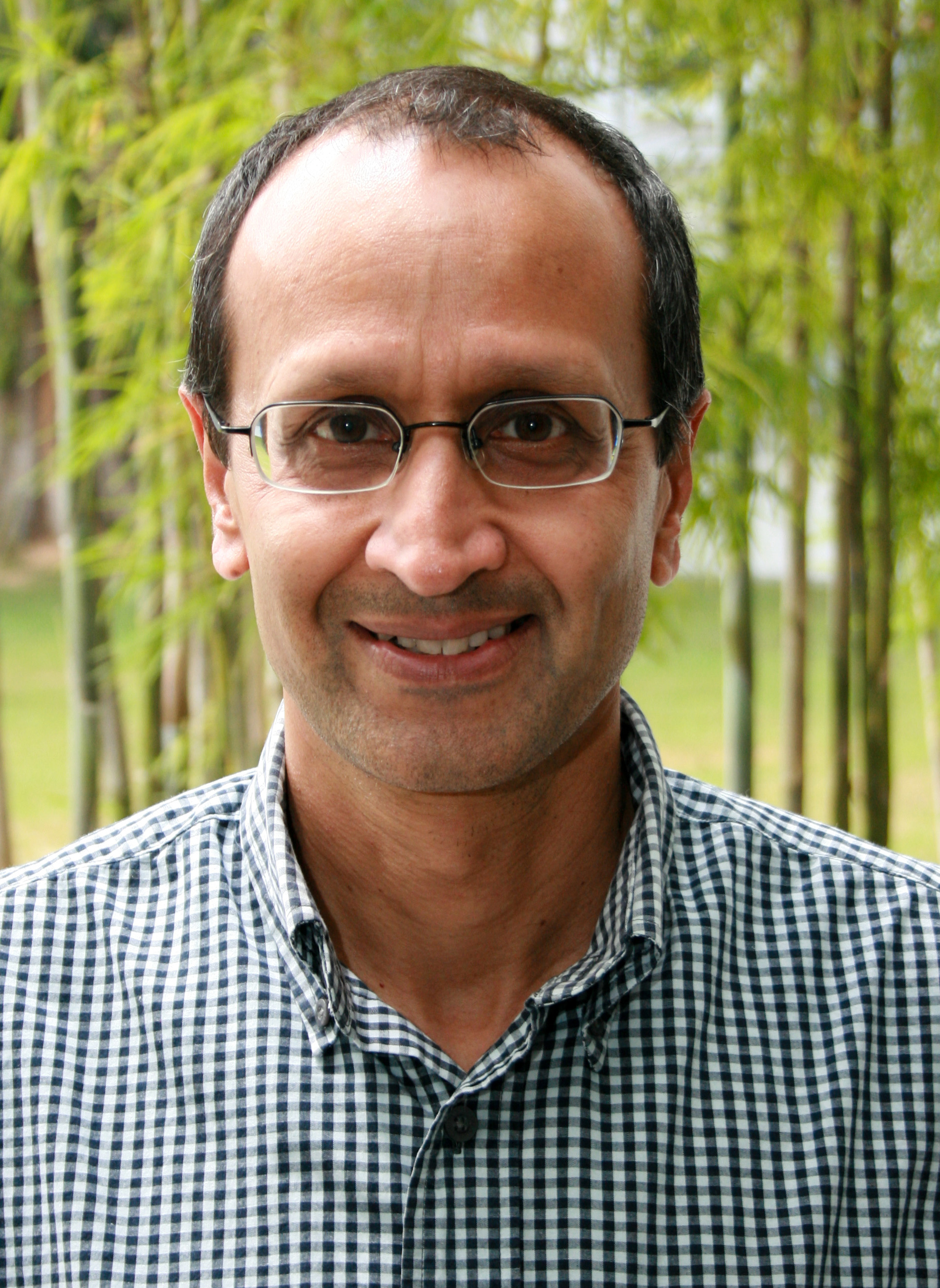
Kanti Bajpai, international affairs researcher and professor at National University of Singapore (Class of '72)

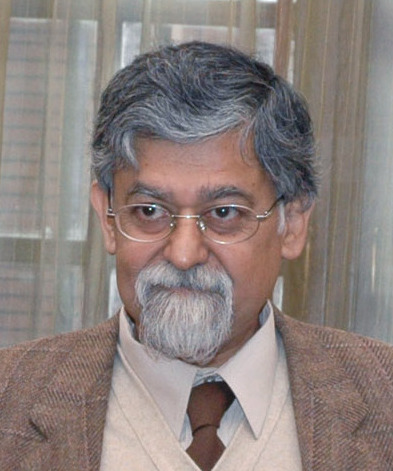
Arvind Virmani, economist (Class of '65)

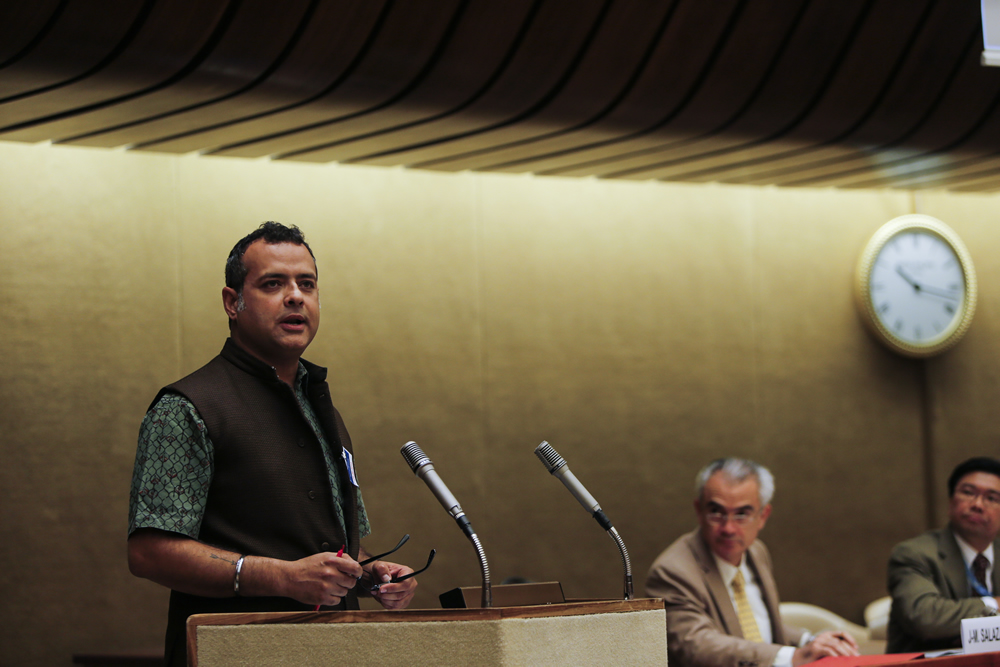
Vijay Prashad, historian (Class of '85) Kamal Aron Mitra Chenoy, Professor of Politics, School of International Studies, Jawaharlal Nehru University, New Delhi

Name	Class year	Notability	Reference(s)
Arjun Singh Bedi	1988	Professor of Development Economics, Erasmus University Rotterdam	
Bhaskar Vira	1985	Head of Department of Geography, University of Cambridge	
Lalit Pande	1963	Founder, Uttarakhand Seva Nidhi Environmental Education Centre	
Arvind Virmani	1965	Economist, former Chief Economic Advisor to the Government of India	
Suman Bery	1964	Economist, former director general of National Council of Applied Economic Research	
Prasenjit Duara	1967	Historian/Professor at Duke University, Writer (Culture, Power And The State)	
Kanti Bajpai	1972	Professor at Lee Kuan Yew School of Public Policy, former headmaster of The Doon School	
Shomie Das	1953	Former Headmaster of The Doon School; Mayo College; Lawrence School, Sanawar	
Wajahat Habibullah	1961	Director of the Lal Bahadur Shastri National Academy of Administration	
Deepak Lal	1955	Economist at University of California, Los Angeles	
Gulab Ramchandani	1948	Former Headmaster of The Doon School	
Ravi J. Matthai	1945	Director of Indian Institute of Management Ahmedabad	
Vijay Prashad	1985	Professor at Trinity College (USA)	
Lovraj Kumar	1947	India's first Rhodes scholar, IAS officer	

== Arts ==
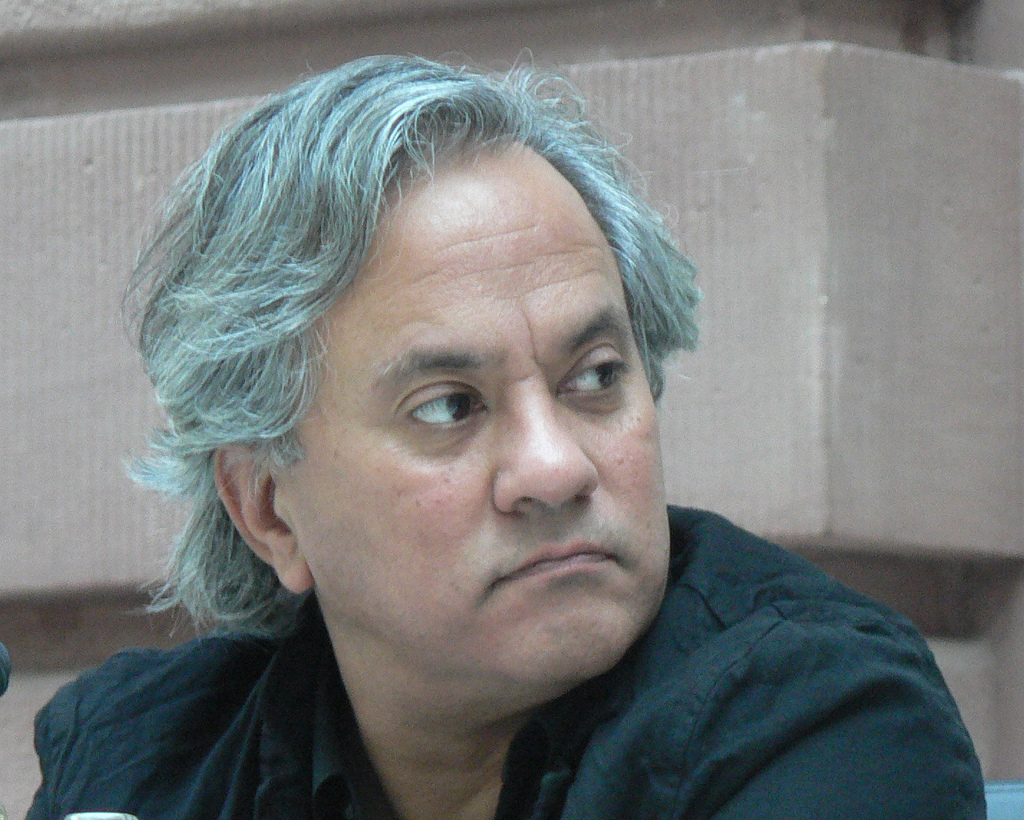
Sir Anish Kapoor, Artist (Class of '70)

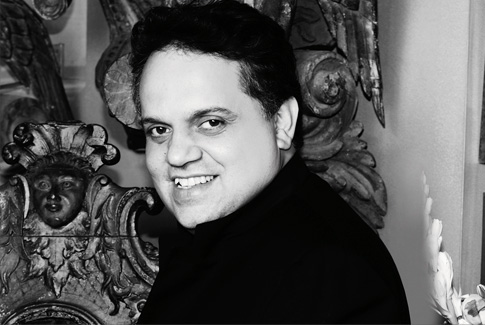
Sandeep Khosla, fashion designer (Class of '81)

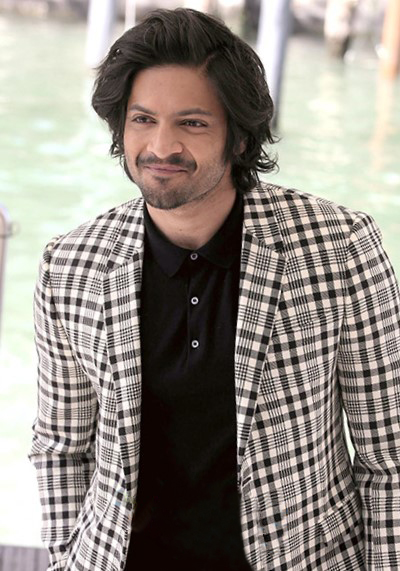
Ali Fazal, actor (Class of 2005)

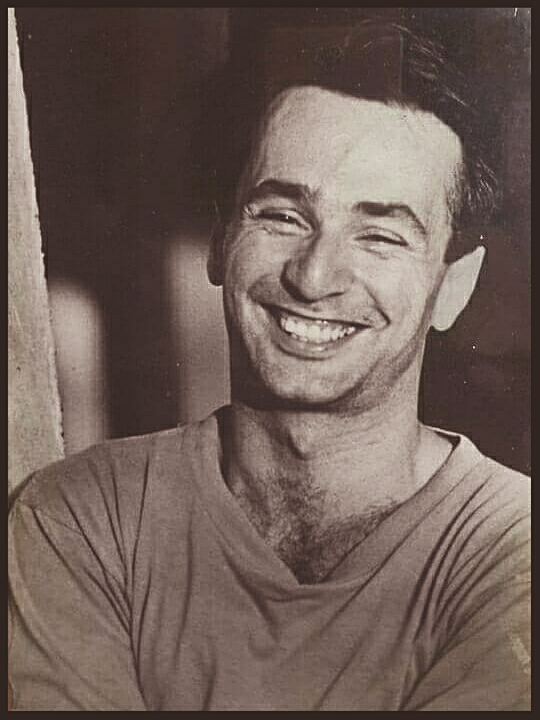
Rohit Khosla, founder of Ensemble, fashion designer (Class of '76)

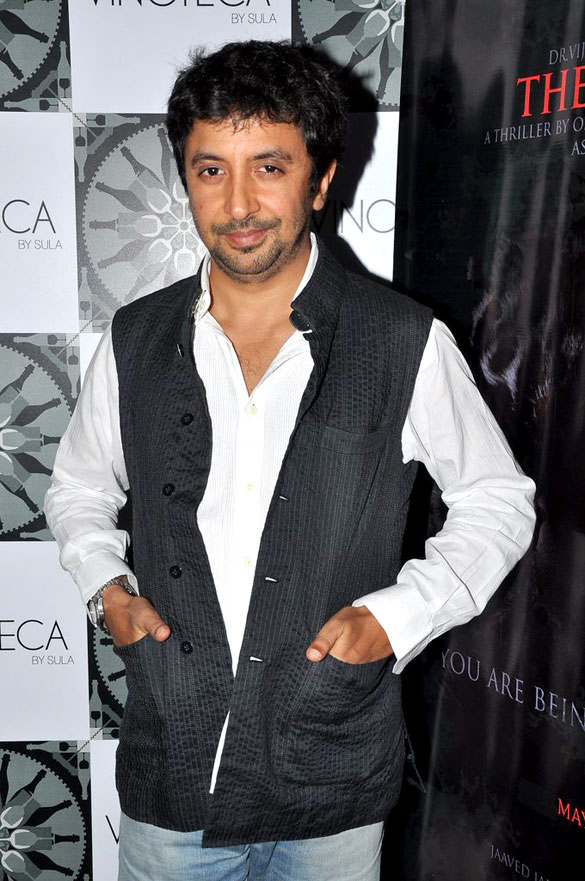
Ashvin Kumar, film director (Class of '91)

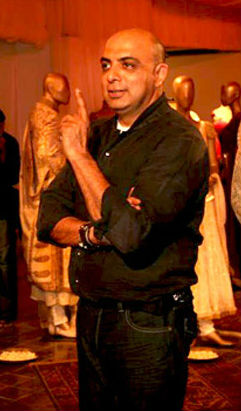
Tarun Tahiliani, fashion designer (Class of '80)

=== Fine arts ===
Name	Class year	Notability	Reference(s)
Sohrab Hura	2000	Photographer	
Anish Kapoor	1970	Sculptor	
Latika Katt nee Sharma	1966	Sculptor	
Vivan Sundaram	1961	Painter	
Abhishek Poddar	1986	Art collector; founder, Museum of Art & Photography	

=== Design ===
Name	Class year	Notability	Reference(s)
Martand Singh	1962	Textile conservator, curator, cultural historian	
Rohit Khosla	1976	Fashion designer	
Tarun Tahiliani	1980	Fashion designer	
Sandeep Khosla	1981	Fashion & Interior designer	
Manoviraj Khosla	1985	Fashion designer	

=== Films ===
Name	Class year	Notability	Reference(s)
Shivendra Singh Dungarpur	1987	Filmmaker, conservator, founder of Film Heritage Foundation	
Ali Fazal	2005	Actor	
Sudhanshu Saria	2002	Screenwriter, Film director	
Ashvin Kumar	1991	Oscar-nominee Film director	
Rajiv Rai	1972	Film producer and director	
Ashwin Mushran	1990	Actor, Voice-over artist	
Roshan Seth	1960	Actor	
Imaad Shah	2004	Actor	
Vivaan Shah	2008	Actor	
Chandrachur Singh	1986	Actor	
Dan Dhanoa	1974	Actor	
Satyadeep Misra	1991	Actor	

=== Television ===
Name	Class year	Notability	Reference(s)
Himani Shivpuri (née Bhatt)	1973	Actor	
Rajeev Siddhartha	2004	Actor	
Neel Madhav	2011	Illusionist, Actor	
Roopak Saluja	1993	Ad director	

=== Music ===
Name	Class year	Notability	Reference(s)
Bhaskar Menon	1972	President, EMI Group	
Nazir Jairazbhoy	1945	Musicologist at University of California, Los Angeles	
Sahej Bakshi	2005	Electronic music composer, as "Dualist Inquiry"	
Hari Singh	2000	Singer, music producer, co-founder Hari & Sukhmani	

=== Culinary ===
Name	Class year	Notability	Reference(s)
Rahul Akerkar	1976	Chef, restaurateur, founder of Indigo	
Deepak Nirula	1968	Restaurateur, founder of Nirula's	?

== Sports ==
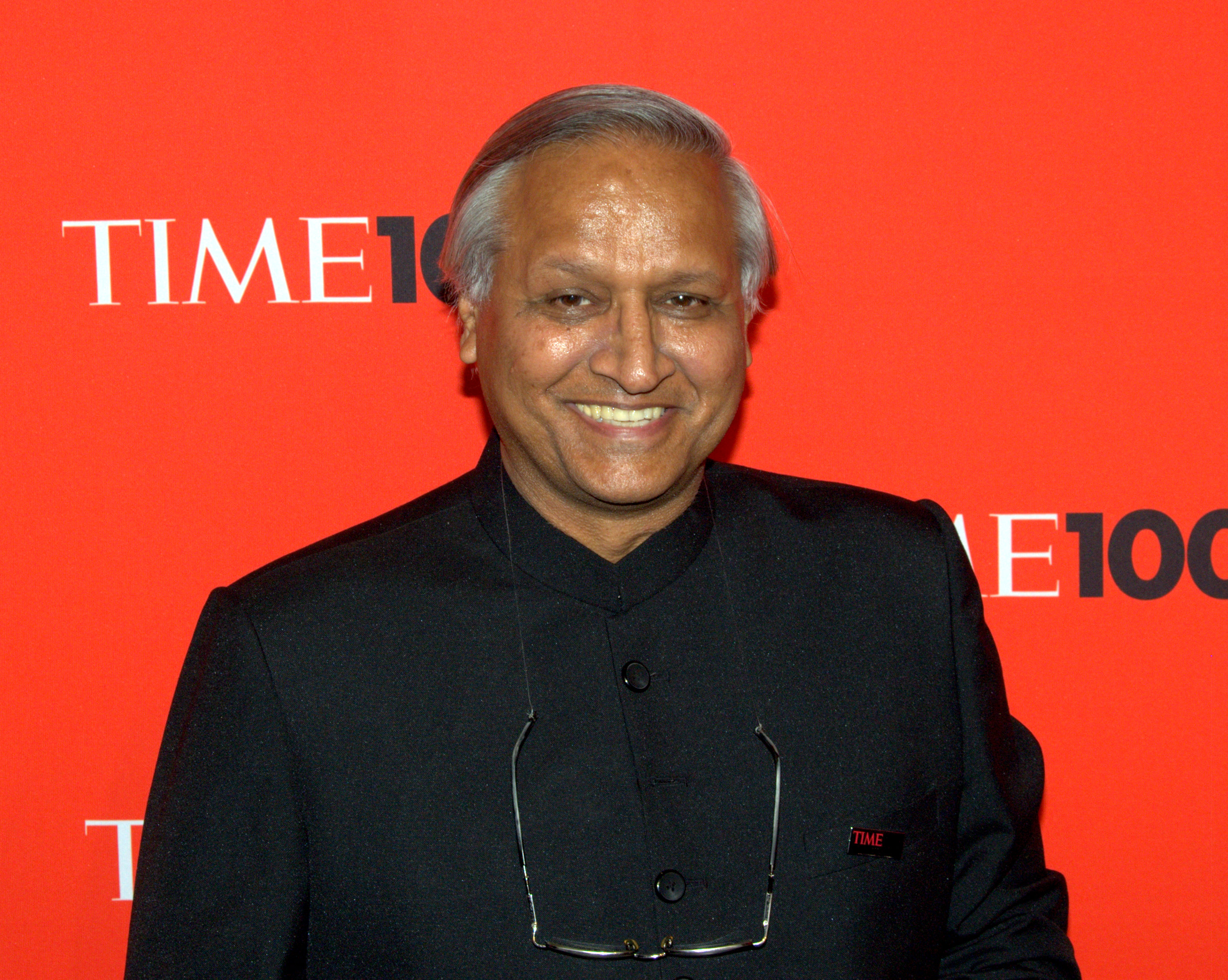
Bunker Roy, Squash champion and founder of Barefoot College, (Class of '62)

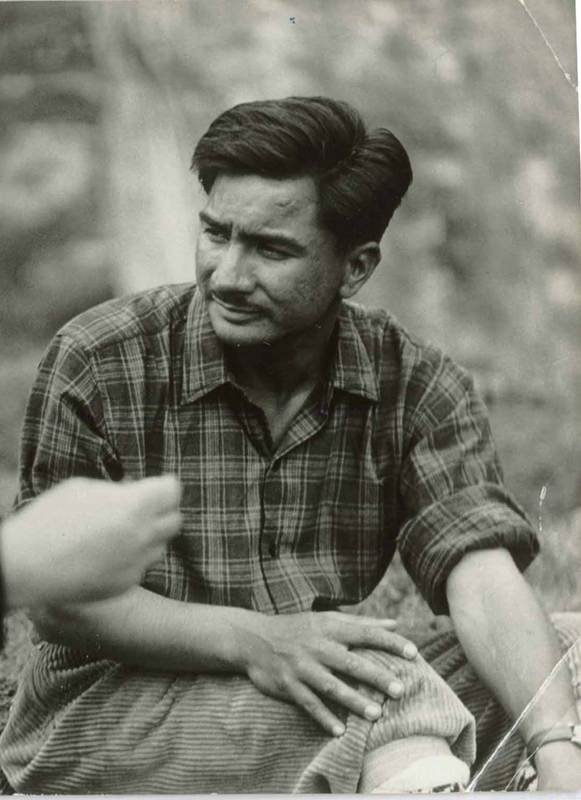
Nandu Jayal, Mountaineer and founder principal of Himalayan Mountaineering Institute (Class of '42)

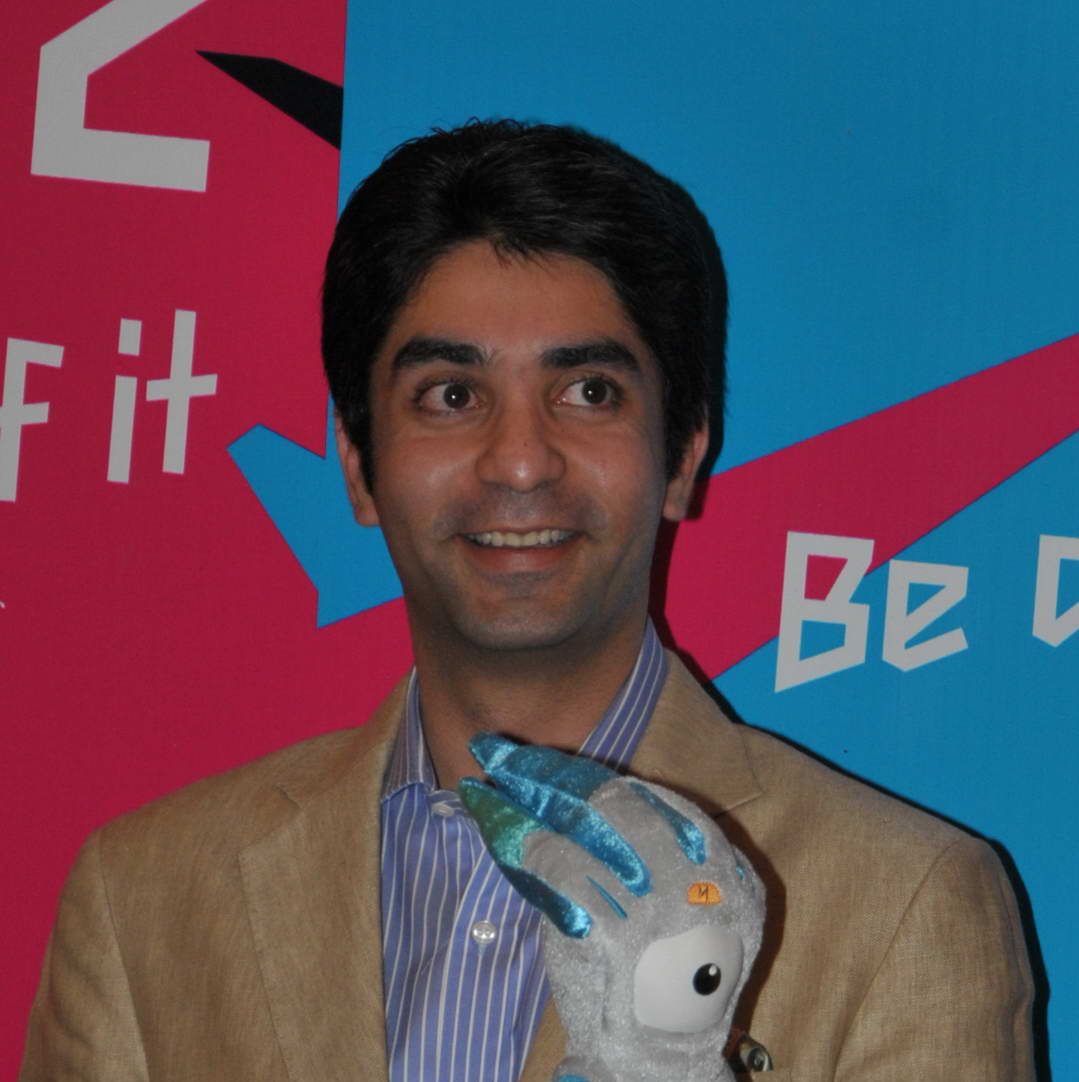
Abhinav Bindra, Olympic shooter champion (Class of 2000)

Name	Class year	Notability	Reference(s)
Abhinav Bindra	2000	Beijing Olympics 2008 Gold Medalist (Air Rifle)	
Nandu Jayal	1942	Mountaineer	
Bunker Roy	1962	National Squash Champion	
Samarjitsinh Gaekwad	1986	Cricketer	
Michael Dalvi	1962	Cricketer	
Sam Agarwal	2009	Cricketer	

== Titular Princes ==
Name	Class year	Notability	Reference(s)
Miangul Aurangzeb	1946	Crown prince of Swat	
Mukarram Jah	1951	Titular Nizam of Hyderabad (1967–1971)	
Hso Khan Pha	1956	Titular Saopha of Yawnghwe	
Rana Hemant Singh	1969	Titular Maharaja of Dholpur (1969–1971)	
Sawai Bhawani Singh	1947	Titular Maharaja of Jaipur (1970–71)	
Pragmulji III	?	Titular Maharaja of Kutch (1991-2021)	

== Sources ==
The class years of the alumni are sourced principally from the following:

- The Dosco Record is a book of short biographies, similar to what may be found in a Who's Who, which was first produced by J.A.K. Martyn who deliberately modeled it on the Harrow Record. (Martyn had been a schoolmaster at Harrow School before helping A.E. Foot start The Doon School.) As a consequence, alumni are listed in the year in which they joined Doon, rather than the year in which they graduated; Martyn believed that this would make it easier for Doscos to look up their friends. The book is updated every 8 years or so, and is published by the Doon School Old Boys Society ("DSOBS") and distributed only to alumni. It includes biographical information about every Dosco (even people like Sanjay Gandhi who was expelled before completing his studies); it also highlights family connections between Doscos such as whether a particular Dosco was the son of another Dosco, or married the sister or daughter of another Dosco.
- The Rose Bowl is a periodic newsletter that contains alumni news, obituaries, reminiscences, etc. It is produced by the DSOBS and distributed by post to all alumni; a PDF version is also sent by email to alumni.
- The Doon School Register is published, every few years, by the DSOBS. It includes the contact details of every Dosco; deceased alumni are noted as such. Also included are the small number of "Associate Members" (honorary members) of The Doon School Old Boys: for the most part these include former teachers; also included are people such as Salim Ali who had been frequent visitors to Doon and were considered to be part of the Dosco fraternity.
- Doon, The Story of a School, edited by Sumer Singh, published by the Indian Public Schools Society 1985. This (somewhat slim) book was distributed to alumni and contains essays, reminiscences, and stories about the founding of the Doon School.
- The Doon School -- Sixty Years On, edited by Pushpinder Singh Chopra, published by the DSOBS in October 1996. This book is similar in many respects to Doon: The Story of a School, but longer.
