= Khosla =

Khosla is a Punjabi Khatri surname found in North India.

== Notable people ==
Notable people who bear the name and may or may not be associated with the community

- Aaital Khosla (born 1993), Indian model
- Ajudhiya Nath Khosla (1892–1984), Indian engineer and politician
- Anil Khosla (born 1959), former Vice Chief of air staff of the Indian Air Force
- Ashok Khosla (born 1940), Indian environmentalist
- Bikky Khosla (born 1960), Indian entrepreneur
- Chaitan Khosla, American biochemist and chemical engineer
- Divya Khosla Kumar (born 1987), Indian Actress, Producer, and Director
- Ekta Khosla, Indian actress and model
- Girik Khosla (born 1995), Indian football player
- Inder Pal Khosla (born 1938), Indian diplomat
- Manoviraj Khosla, Indian fashion designer
- Neeru Khosla (born 1955/1956), co-founder of the non-profit CK12 Foundation
- Pradeep Khosla (born 1957), Indian American computer scientist
- Raj Khosla (1925–1991), Indian film director
- Rajiv Khosla (born 1971), Indian American scientist
- Rishi Khosla (born 1975), British entrepreneur
- Rohit Khosla (1958–1994), Indian fashion designer
- Sandeep Khosla, Indian fashion designer
- Sanjay Khosla, Indian-American engineer, consultant and executive
- Shantanu Khosla, Indian executive
- Shantiraj Khosla (1966–2021), Indian music composer
- Vinod Khosla (born 1955), Indian-born American venture capitalist

== See also ==
- Khosla Ka Ghosla, an Indian film
- Khosla Commission, a one-man commission established in India in July 1970 to re-investigate the death of Subhas Chandra Bose
- Khosla Ventures, American venture capital firm
