= Wahi (disambiguation) =

Wahi or wahy is the Arabic word for revelation in the context of Islam.

Wahi, Vahi, WAHI, or WaHI may also refer to:

== People ==
- Adita Wahi (born ?), an Indian actress and model
- Elye Wahi (born 2003), a French footballer
- Karan Wahi (born 1986), an Indian actor and host
- Pravesh Wahi, Indian politician
- Purshottam Lal Wahi (born 1928), an Indian cardiologist
- Satya Pal Wahi (born 1950), former chairman of ONGC
- Rakesh Wahi (born 1975), an Indian businessman and army veteran

== Other uses ==
- Vahi, a tribe of the Turu people from north-central Tanzania
- WaHI, or "Washington Heights and Inwood", two neighborhoods in Upper Manhattan, New York City
- WAHI, ICAO code for Yogyakarta International Airport

== See also ==
- Wahi grosbeak
