= Dosco =

Dosco can refer to:

- Doon School alumni, or Doscos
- Dominion Steel and Coal Corporation, or DOSCO
