= Wealth Migrate =

- Company type: Private
- Industry: Finance
- Founded: 2009
- Founders: Scott Picken and Hennie Bezuidenhoudt
- Headquarters: South Africa
- Services: Online Real Estate Marketplace
- Website: WealthMigrate.com

Wealth Migrate is an online marketplace that allows users to directly invest in a property suggested by the website itself.

== History ==
Scott Picken and Hennie Bezuidenhoudt founded Wealth Migrate in 2009. The company is an online real estate marketplace that allows individuals to invest in property around the world. The company allows for investors to make both residential and commercial investments, dependent on the country where the investment is taking place. The concept was a spin-off idea from Picken's university thesis, which discussed the use of technology in financial markets during the late 1990s. The company initially assisted South African's with their overseas investments, before expanding to other markets.

The CEOs of Wealth Migrate and its competitors predict that the real estate crowdfunding market will grow over the next decade. In 2014, The Huffington Post listed Wealth Migrate as one of the top United States Real Estate Crowdfunding Platforms. Later that year, it was stated that the crowdfunding market had made over $2.5 billion in a single year, with predictions that crowdfunding would continue to grow as a way of investing in real estate.

In 2015, the company announced investment of over $4 million, as funding for further expansion.

During an interview with CNBC, Picken stated that Wealth Migrate was looking at purchasing pubs in the London-area and then converting them into convenience stores. Such moves by investment companies and large British-based supermarkets, has frequently received coverage in the United Kingdom. Later that year, CrowdfundingInsider announced that the company was expanding its offices in Asia. With offices already located in Singapore and Hong Kong, they announced they were expanding their operations to Shanghai.

== Investments ==
Wealth Migrate investments are suggested to be 70% commercial and 30% residential. The platform was developed to give investors the opportunity to make alternative investments in a property when compared to more traditional routes.

The concept was developed when statistics suggested that large equity companies would often invest a small percentage of their funds into real estate. Wealth Migrate summarized that by using technology and crowdfunding, investments in large developments could be made by individuals acting in groups, allowing them to receive a much higher return on investment, compared to the individual acting alone.

One of the major examples that were quoted on CNBC Africa, was the investment made in the medical market. The company CEO stated that they invested close to hospitals geographically, which allowed a steady return on the investment. Another example given was the investment and purchasing of commercial property around London, where they would then rent the property to a convenience store company once it had been purchased.
