= Scott Picken =

South African-born real estate investor and entrepreneur

- Born: February 1977 (age 49); South Africa
- Education: University of Greenwich
- Occupations: Entrepreneur, author
- Employer: Wealth Migrate
- Known for: Co-founder of fintech company Wealth Migrate
- Website: scottpicken.com

Scott Picken is a South African-born real estate investor and entrepreneur. He is the co-founder of Wealth Migrate, a fintech company that offers real estate investments on its online marketplace through crowdfunding.

He began working in real estate at the age of 26 when he founded International Property Solutions. The Huffington Post named Wealth Migrate as one of the top 60 real estate crowdfunding solutions in the United States in 2014.

Picken is the author of Property Going Global.

== Early life and education ==
Picken grew up in South Africa, before he moved to London to study. In 1998, Picken wrote his dissertation on how he expected technology to change the way we invest in property. He moved to London to continue his education. Picken graduated in 2001 with a master's degree, also studying the effect of technology on real estate investing.

== Career ==
After leaving University, Picken setup International Property Solutions (IPS) at the age of 26. The company assisted people with overseas investments in his native South Africa. During the next few years, Picken helped thousands of people invest in property on four different continents.

During an interview, Picken recalled the opportunity to invest in property after the 2008 financial crisis hit. He stated that there were incredible buying opportunities in Wimbledon, London at the time. In order to capitalize on these opportunities, he required £10 million but didn't have the time to raise the funds. He decided that after missing the buying opportunity, he would be interested in creating a vehicle that allowed investors to have quick access to buying power.

Following the development of the idea, Picken co-founded Wealth Migrate with Hennie Bezuidenhoudt as his co-founder. The company was launched to assist people to invest in real estate assets, through various partnerships. Picken took the step of using a number of existing partners to launch the crowdfunding platform. Picken was interviewed in the media on a regular basis following the launch of the innovative company. The platform allowed individuals to invest in property around the world.

The idea was further developed by Picken after he studied the figures behind small investments made in real estate. Using equity companies as an example, they would often invest a small percentage of their funds into real estate. Serious investors would likely use a middleman for these transactions, which would dramatically affect the return on investment. Wealth Migrate's margins were not only lower than traditional charges, but it also made larger projects more accessible to the common real estate investor.

Picken stated in an interview with CNBC that investors could make both residential and commercial investments. Individual investors would normally struggle to invest in larger projects, as they would have to either find the partners themselves or find other ways to raise the full capital amount. Wealth Migrate would allow capital investments as low as $10,000 for investors. The idea was launched in South Africa, before expanding abroad.

After five years in operation, Wealth Migrate was selected by The Huffington Post as one of the top United States Real Estate Crowdfunding Platforms. The selection likely came off the back of the growth of the real estate crowdfunding market, which grew to $2.5 billion in transactions in a single year in 2014.

Picken featured in the news during 2015, discussing how he felt crowdfunding would radically change the way real estate transactions take place globally. He raised $4 million in capital for Wealth Migrate for further expansion in the same year. The Wealth Migrate brand expanded its operations to Asia in 2015, under the leadership of Picken.

== Investments ==
During an interview with CNBC, Picken discussed his investment strategy for Wealth Migrate in the London-area. The commercial real estate opportunity was based on converting abandoned pubs in the United Kingdom into convenience stores. The moves received coverage in the British media, as many supermarket chains used this as a method to open convenience stores in the country in recent years.

Picken suggested in an interview with GQ (magazine) that investments made by his firm are 70% commercial and 30% residential. The platform was developed to give serious investors the opportunity to make alternative commercial investments when compared to more traditional routes.

One of the major examples that were quoted on CNBC Africa, was the investment made in the medical market. Picken stated that Wealth Migrate invested close to hospitals geographically, which allowed a steady return on the investment. Another example given was the investment and purchasing of commercial property around London, where they would then rent the property to a convenience store company once it had been purchased.

== Publications ==
Picken is the author of the book, Property Going Global.
