= Paul Theron =

- Born: Paul Richard Theron; 13 December 1966 (age 58); Johannesburg, South Africa
- Education: MSc Engineering in Energy Studies, University of Cape Town
- Occupation(s): Asset Manager, CNBC Africa Contributor
- Spouse: Marion Shaer
- Children: 3

Paul Theron (born December 13, 1966) is the founder and CEO of Vestact, a Johannesburg private client asset management firm. Previously on CNBC Africa he co-hosted the Hot Stoxx show as well as Blunders with Paul Theron.

Theron was named in 2013 as one of The 106 Finance People You Have To Follow On Twitter by Business Insider.

Theron grew up in Pretoria and graduated from Pretoria Boys High School in 1984. In that year he was both the Head Prefect and the Dux Scholar.

Theron holds a Master's degree in Engineering (Energy Studies) from the University of Cape Town, having graduated in 1991.

Theron was also the founder of South Africa's first online stockbroker, Tradek, in 1996.

He is married to Marion Shaer and lives in Houghton, Johannesburg. Theron is an avid runner.
