= Biddanda Chengappa Nanda =

Indian general (1931–2018)

Lieutenant General B C Nanda PVSM, AVSM

7th General Officer Commanding-in-Chief, Northern Command

Personal details
- Born: 12 May 1931 Madikeri, Kodagu
- Died: 12 December 2018 (aged 87) Madikeri
- Resting place: Madikeri
- Relations: Field Marshal Cariappa (Uncle)
- Awards: Param Vishisht Seva Medal; Ati Vishisht Seva Medal
- Nickname: BC

Military service
- Allegiance: India
- Branch/service: Indian Army
- Years of service: 1951-1989
- Rank: Lieutenant General
- Unit: Mahar Regiment
- Commands: Northern Command; II Corps (India); 7th Indian Infantry Division
- Battles/wars: Annexation of Goa; Siachen Conflict; Bangladesh Liberation War

Lieutenant General Biddanda Chengappa Nanda, PVSM, AVSM was born on 12 May 1931 in Madikeri, Kodagu. His early childhood was spent on the Andaman Islands where his father was a Forest Officer. He completed his schooling at Doon School, Dehradun.

Commissioned into the army on 10 June 1951. He served in Jammu and Kashmir and saw action during the liberation of Goa and Bangladesh.

General Nanda retired after 38 years of distinguished service in the Indian Army and settled in his hometown of Madikeri, where he had his coffee plantations.

An avid lover of nature, he actively contributed to wildlife conservation and preservation of the flora and fauna of the Western Ghats.

== Early life and education ==
B C Nanda was born on 12 May 1931 in Madikeri, Kodagu. His mother, Bollava, was the fifth child of Kodandera Madappa. She had five siblings, four brothers and a sister. One of these brothers was the late Field Marshal K. M. Cariappa. His father, Biddanda Subbaiah Chengappa was the eldest in a family of five brothers and one sister. At the time of Nanda's birth, he was serving in the Andaman Islands, in the Forest Department.

At the age of three months he and his siblings travelled with his mother to join his father and most of his early childhood was spent on the Andaman Islands. The family lived in rough jungle camps and were helped occasionally by prisoners from the famed Cellular Jail who were allowed to work on the islands as a reward for good behaviour.

The family frequently moved from one island to another as required by his father's job in this hitherto unexplored region. The experiences of this time developed his love of nature.

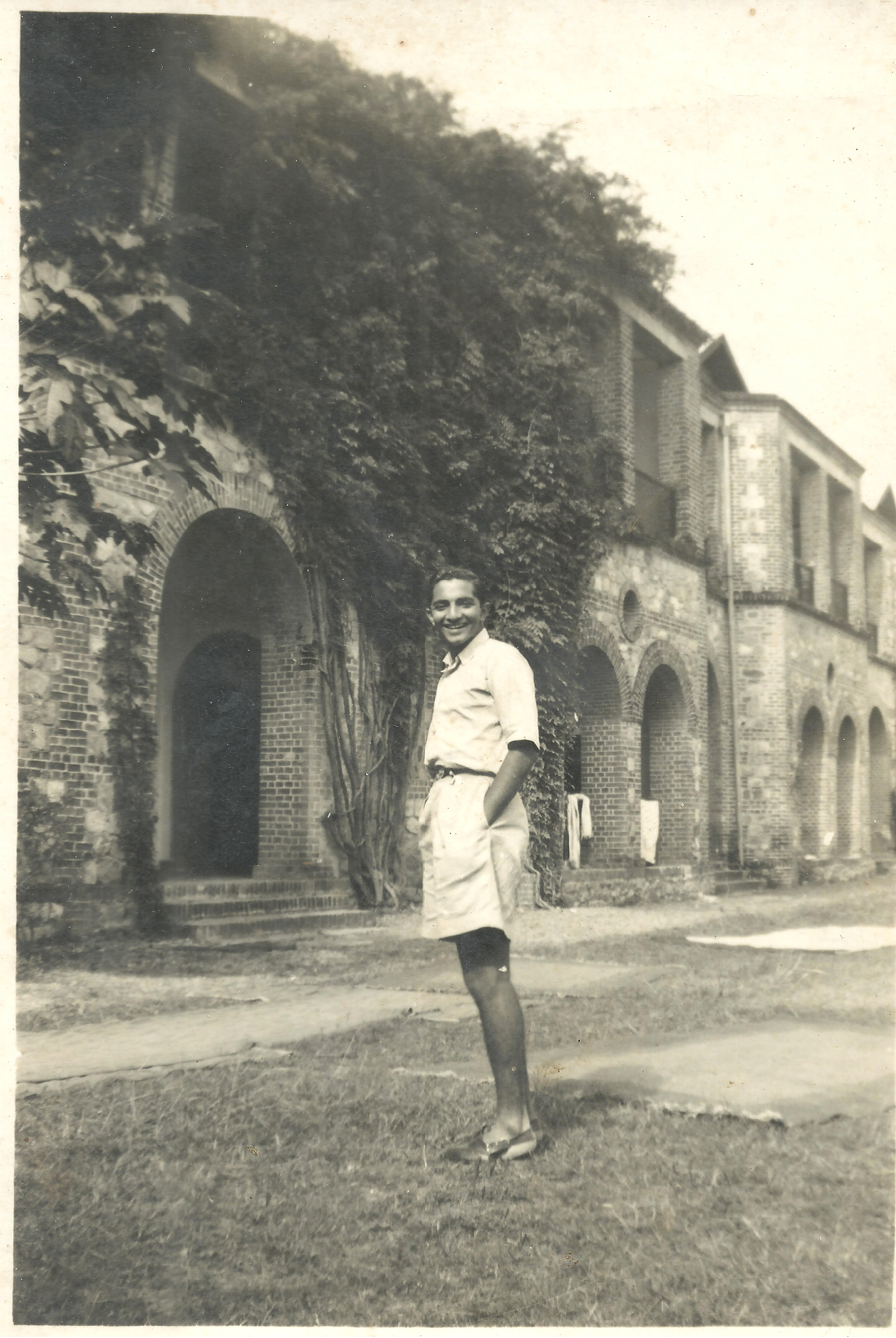
B C Nanda at Doon School circa 1940s

At the age of 9 Nanda was sent to the mainland to attend St. Bedes School in Madras. In 1941 he moved to Madikeri and attended St. Joseph's school briefly after which he was enrolled at St Aloysius' in Mangalore. In 1943 B.S. Chengappa was transferred to the Forest Research Institute in Dehradun and Nanda was enrolled in The Doon School. He completed his schooling at Doon School, Dehradun.

The family lived in New Forest, that was close to the Imperial Forest Service and the Imperial Civil Service and later the Indian Military Academy. As a result they received many visitors to their home including such personalities as Major Ayub Khan, later Field Marshal Ayub Khan of Pakistan and Idris Hassan Latif who, later became Chief of Air Staff.

At school he participated in sports and extracurricular activities with equal enthusiasm. He worked shoulder to shoulder with schoolmates, digging drains and educating the residents of a village that had been adopted by the school. He was part of mountaineering and hunting expeditions and was an accomplished sportsman, captaining the cricket team and boxing at a competitive level.

In 1949 Nanda joined the Indian Military Academy. He went through the training and passed out in the top 20 in his batch. While at the IMA he played cricket for the Academy and played against the visiting Commonwealth Eleven, which included such stalwarts as Jim Laker, Tom Graveny and Frank Worrell. Upon his graduation, inspired by the IMA's Commandant General K.S. Thimayya's mention of the exceptional bravery of the Mahar soldier during the Kashmir conflict, he opted to be commissioned into the Mahar Regiment.

== Military career ==
After the IMA he was dispatched to 2 Mahar located at Dagshai in the Shimla Hills. Two months later due to threats from Pakistan troops were moved to the Punjab border and Nanada was posted with the Headquarters of 2 Mahar near a village called Chajjalwadi in the Punjab. He subsequently spent tenures with Delta Company near the Attari Border and Charlie Company located a little east of Amritsar.

At the time there were only three Machine Gun Battalions in the Indian Army (The 1st, 2nd and 3rd Mahar Battalions). As a result they had to constantly relieve each other in Jammu and Kashmir. Second Mahar had moved out of Jammu and Kashmir in mid 1951 and spent a year and a half on the Pakistan border in near war condition; when in mid 1953 orders were received for the Battalions’ re-induction to the operational theatre of Jammu and Kashmir. Nanda was nominated to go with the advance party which was to facilitate the takeover of the area and operational responsibility from the 3rd Battalion the Mahar MG Regiment.

The next two years were spent with the Battalion in Jammu and Kashmir and during this time he was posted to various appointments in Uri, Rampur, Tithwal, Pattan, Khannabal and Jammu, facing the Pakistanis at close quarters.

He was then sent on the Regimental Signalling Officers Course to Poona (Pune) and was recommended to be an instructor at the Army Signals School. Later he was sent on the Platoon Weapons Course to Mhow where he stood first in the Rifle and Close Quarter Battle tests.

1955 he was posted to the Mahar Regimental Centre at Saugor where he was appointed Training Adjutant. During this short tenure he was sent on two training courses. The first was the Medium Machine Gun course in Mhow, where he was graded AX and recommended as an instructor. The second was the general Intelligence Course for officers at Poona and he received a B grade and was once more recommended for the position of instructor.

In 1957 he was posted as an instructor at the Infantry School in Mhow. During this period he appeared for his promotion exams for the move from Captain to Major and achieved a distinction in the practical (Part C) and qualified easily in the written (Part D)

In 1959 Nanda was ordered to join a new rising, 7 Mahar, at Saugor.

1961 He was sent on the Junior Command Course (JC Course) at Mhow passing it with a Distinction. The Battalion then moved to Ambala and was placed under the 17th Infantry Division. Soon thereafter the 17th Infantry Division was ordered to move South for operations involving the liberation of Goa. He was given command of the Delta Company that was affiliated to 48 Infantry Brigade.

He was appointed the Adjutant at the Mahar Regimental Centre in 1962. He appeared for the Staff College entrance exam and obtained a competitive vacancy in 1964. Communication was received from Army HQ that he was one of two Army officers nominated to attend the Staff College at Camberley in the UK. While attending the course he also played squash, cricket and hockey for the College.

Nanda was then posted as General Staff Officer at the Military Operations Directorate.

His next posting was to 10 Mahar located at Sakrana, across the River Munawar Wali Tawi in the Jammu-Akhnoor sector of J&K where he was sent as the Second-in-Command (2IC) of the Battalion.

He then proceeded to command 9 Mahar in Mendhar, J&K and after this he was sent to 33 Corps as General Staff Officer Grade One (GSOI) in the operational branch. The HQ was in Silliguri in the Eastern Sector from March 1971 to April 1972.

In April 1972 he was selected to attend the Higher Command Course, which was the first of its kind being run in India, at Mhow. The participants of the HC Course visited the battlefields of 1965 and 1971, from Jammu and Kashmir to Punjab and Rajasthan. and were able to, in many cases, meet with the commanders who actually participated in the battles, speak with them pose questions and learn from their experience.

On completion of the HC course Nanda was posted to the Defence Services Staff College, Wellington as Senior Instructor (Army) in the rank of Full Colonel..

In September 1973 on being promoted to the rank of Brigadier, he commanded an Infantry Brigade in the Western Sector till December 1975.

In 1976 Nanda was one of two officers from India selected to attend a course at the Royal College of Defense Studies in the UK. At the college they were exposed to and expected to learn a wide spectrum of subjects and disciplines including economics, sociology, geopolitics, science, administration, policing and media in its various forms. Within the UK they visited industries, counter insurgency forces (in Northern Ireland), the police and the media to gain first hand experience and on the ground exposure. They were also sent on tours outside the UK to various countries to study of their strengths and areas of opportunity. Nanda was assigned to a group that visited and studied Southern Europe including Turkey, Yugoslavia (then undivided), Greece, Italy and Cyprus. They also visited NATO headquarters, and Germany and the then divided Berlin.

The two Indian officers also had the opportunity to meet renown personalities such as the brother of the great Field Marshal Montgomery and Lady Slim, the widow of Field Marshal William Slim who had a long relationship with India. They were also invited to the Queen’s garden party at Buckingham Palace where the Queen herself made it a point to meet all officers individually.

On his return he was posted to the Defence Services Staff College as Chief Instructor (Army) from January 1977 to March 1979. As the senior-most instructor he was also the Deputy Commandant.

At the end of this tenure he was posted to Army HQ as Deputy Director of Military Operations A'.

In October 1980 he was promoted to the rank of Major General and took over the command of 7th Infantry Division in Ferozepur, Punjab. During his command of 7 Div. he had the opportunity to be part of an Army Delegation to the erstwhile USSR led by Lt Gen Hriday Kaul. He commanded the division till December 1982 when he returned to Army HQ as the Deputy Military Secretary. Once again Nanda was selected to accompany the then Army Chief General Krishna Rao on a visit to Vietnam. He remained in the post of Deputy Military Secretary till December 1984.

On 17 December 1984 he was promoted to the rank of Lieutenant General and took over command of 2 Corps.

General Nanda served as the first Director General of Defense Planning Staff, Chief of Staff Committee, Ministry of Defense, from 30 April 1986 to 31 May 1987.

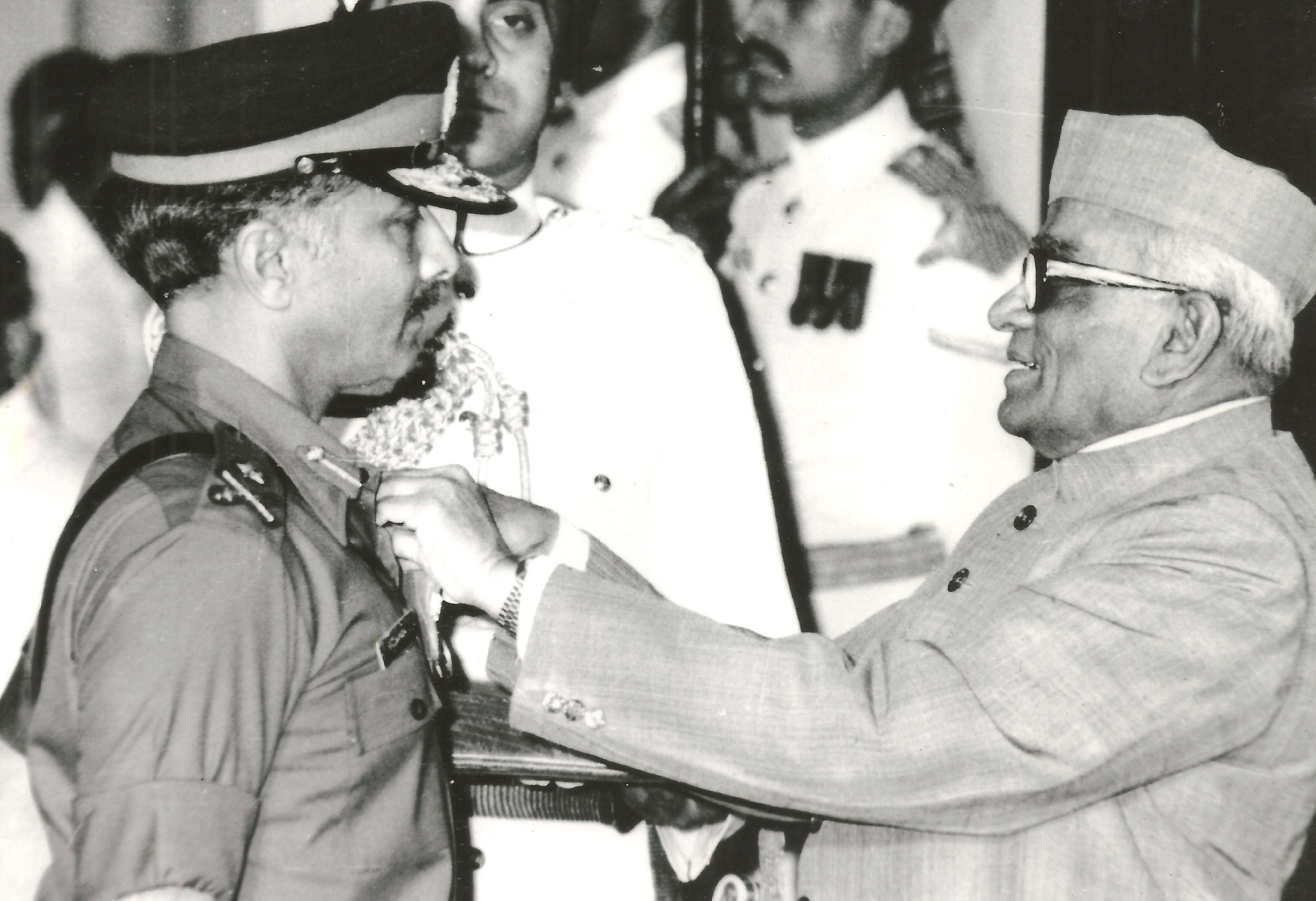
Lt. Gen B. C. Nanda receives the PVSM Medal from President R. Venkataraman in 1987

He took over as GOC-in-C Northern Command on 1 June 1987.

He was appointed honorary ADC to the President of India.

He was Mentioned in Dispatch in 1971, and was awarded the Ati Vishisht Seva Medal on 26 January 1982 and the Param Vishisht Seva Medal on 26 January 1987

He also served as the Colonel of the Mahar Regiment until his retirement and remained active in supporting Regimental activities even after he retired. In November 2016 he returned to the Regimental Centre at Saugor, for the Platinum Jubilee of the Mahar Regiment as chief guest at the wreath laying ceremony at the War Memorial.

=== Post-retirement ===
Lt. Gen B. C. Nanda moved to Madikeri, Kodagu after he retired and actively participated in multiple social initiatives. He was the president of the Coorg Wildlife Society from 1993 to 1997. In June 2001 he inaugurated the permanent premises of the society that was built on land donated by his mother Bollu Chengappa. He was an avid birdwatcher and kept meticulous records of the migratory species of bird that came to Coorg each year. His observations and records have been referenced in birdwatching newsletters and reports over many years. Additionally he encouraged the conservation and environmental protection of not just Kodagu but the Western Ghat biosphere.

He remained actively involved in Ex-Servicemen's affairs in the District.

In 1994 Lt. Gen. B. C. Nanda was conferred the Karnataka Rajyotsava Award.

Lt. Gen. B. C. Nanda died on 12 December 2018 at Madikeri following a brief illness. He was laid to rest with full Military Honors on 13 December 2018.

== Awards and decorations ==
During his career, he has been awarded with PVSM, AVSM and was Mentioned in Dispatches in 1971

Param Vishisht Seva Medal		Ati Vishisht Seva Medal	
India General Service Medal 1947	Poorvi Star	Siachen Glacier Medal	Raksha Medal
Sangram Medal	Sainya Seva Medal	High Altitude Service Medal	25th Independence Anniversary Medal
30 Years Long Service Medal	20 Years Long Service Medal	9 Years Long Service Medal	Mentioned-in-Dispatches – 1971

== Dates of rank ==
Insignia	Rank	Component	Date of rank
	Second Lieutenant	Indian Army	10 June 1951
	Lieutenant	Indian Army	10 June 1953
	Captain	Indian Army	10 June 1957
	Major	Indian Army	10 June 1964
	Lieutenant-Colonel	Indian Army	9 August 1968
	Colonel	Indian Army	25 July 1974
	Brigadier	Indian Army	28 April 1975
	Major General	Indian Army	3 October 1980
	Lieutenant-General	Indian Army	17 December 1984

== See also ==
- K. M. Cariappa
- Mahar Regiment
- Northern Command (India)
- Doon School Alumni

Military offices
Preceded by A. K. Handoo	General Officer Commanding-in-Chief Northern Command; 1 June 1987 – 31 May 1989	Succeeded by Gurinder Singh
Preceded by None	Director General of Defense Planning Staff; 25 October xxx- xxxx	Succeeded by xx
Preceded by xxxx	General Officer Commanding II Corps; 17 December 1984 – 29 April 1986	Succeeded by xxx
Preceded by	General Officer Commanding 7th Infantry Div; October 1980 - December 1982	Succeeded by
