= The Doon School Old Boys' Society =

Alumni society of The Doon School, India

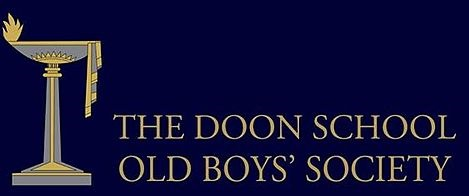
- Abbreviation: DSOBS
- Established: 1939
- Type: Alumni association
- Legal status: Non-profit organization
- Location: Defence Colony, New Delhi, India
- Members: c. 5,000
- President: Junaid Altaf
- Vice President: Akash Puri
- Affiliations: Indian Public Schools' Society
- Website: dsobs.net

The Doon School Old Boys' Society (informally DSOBS) is the alumni society of The Doon School, an all-boys boarding school in Dehradun, Uttarakhand, India, founded in 1935. It is considered to be among the most influential old boys' networks in India, with its alumni including a former Indian prime minister, politicians, diplomats, officers of the defence forces, writers and artists. The first president of the society was the Englishman Arthur Foot, who was the first headmaster at Doon. Alumni of the school are known as Doscos and after graduating gain life-membership to the society.

In the media, it has often been described as "elitist", and in 1985 the Washington Post reported: "[It] raises the question of who should run India, and whether it is healthy that a minuscule elite exerts such influence on a democracy whose founders were determined to break from its caste-ridden, imperialist past." In another report in The New York Times, Steven Weisman wrote: "Not surprisingly, Doon School people are sensitive to criticism that they are sharpening the worst tendencies in a country long burdened by caste and social hierarchies." This was followed by a quote from Ajit Narain Haksar, an old boy, who stated: "We are not an elite in the conniving sense...Merit is still the basic criterion."

== History ==
Although the society met ever since the first cohort graduated in 1939, the Memorandum of Association of the Society was formulated in 1945 and it was registered under the Societies Registration Act in 1946, with Arthur E. Foot, the then headmaster of Doon, as the founder president. The second headmaster J.A.K. Martyn succeeded Foot in the post. After Martyn's retirement, Surender Kandhari became the first 'old boy' president of the society. The society is officially recognised through memorandum of association under Indian Societies Registration Act. The motto of the society is An Aristocracy of Service, borrowed from Arthur Foot's statement at the formal opening of the school on 27 October 1935: "Truly, we mean that the boys should leave the Doon School as members of an aristocracy, but it must be an aristocracy of service inspired by the ideals of unselfishness, not one of privilege, wealth or position."

=== Dosco Register ===
John Martyn conceptualised the first 'Dosco Register' in the 1970s, inviting responses to a questionnaire from alumni across the world. It was to include details of every Dosco, Doon School Old Boy, graduated ever since the school opened in 1935. The register was first published in 1979 and is still in print today. It is continually updated and the fourth, and latest, edition was published in 2013.

=== Rose Bowl ===
Named after the Greek-styled amphitheatre on campus, Rose Bowl is the magazine for alumni of The Doon School. It is distributed to about 4,000 Doscos around the world. Articles cover news about the alumni (births, deaths, obituaries), subjects such as current affairs, history, literature as well as the school itself. Contributors have included many Doon School alumni, such as the writer Amitav Ghosh, Karan Thapar and Kobad Ghandy.

In the February 2014 issue, alumni wrote a letter in the Rose Bowl campaigning for the release of Kobad Ghandy, who had been imprisoned in Tihar Jail for four years without a conviction, and charged for being a member of the banned Communist Party of India (Maoist). The campaign was reported in the Indian media.

== Organisation ==
Today the society plays an important role in keeping ex-Doscos in touch with one another. There are currently some 5,000 members worldwide. It regularly organizes sports and social events for the alumni body around the world. Places outside India which host regular Dosco meet-ups include: London, Toronto, New York, San Francisco, Singapore, Sydney; in India, they are: Delhi, Mumbai, Kolkata, Bangalore, Jaipur and Dehradun.

=== Fundraising ===
The society also raises funds for educational, philanthropic and charitable causes. The funds have helped relief efforts for 2004 Indian Ocean earthquake and tsunami, the 2013 North India floods, and COVID-19 pandemic in India.

== Controversies ==
In 2014, billionaire meat exporter Moin Qureshi, then serving as the president of the society, was charged for tax evasion by the Enforcement Directorate. He consequently resigned from his position as president. The DSOBS came under the scanner, along with the alumni society of St. Stephen's College, Delhi (Qureshi's college), when a senior ED official told the newspaper Sunday Guardian: "Qureshi’s political and bureaucratic network is still working for him and most of his friends from his school days, mainly lawyers, are even trying to halt the investigation."

In 2017, the society's Foreign Contribution Regulation Act's licence, which allows an organisation to receive funds from outside the country, was cancelled by the Union Home Ministry, due to the failure of filing annual returns for five consecutive years.

In 2018, the society threatened legal action against The Times of India, after the newspaper reported a rape and murder case in a Dehradun school using the words "Doon school" in its headline, implying a school located in the Doon Valley. The newspaper corrected the headline to mention "Dehradun school", and included a disclaimer stating that the school mentioned in the story had no connection with The Doon School.

== See also ==
- The Doon School
- List of The Doon School alumni
