= Nirula's =

Indian fast food restaurant chain

- Company type: Private
- Industry: Quick serve restaurants
- Founded: 1934; 92 years ago
- Founder: Lakshmi Chand Nirula; Madan Gopal Nirula
- Headquarters: Delhi, India
- Number of locations: 77 (Sep 2022): 34 QSRs; 43 ice-cream parlors
- Area served: North India (focus: NCR Delhi)
- Key people: Deepak Nirula
- Products: Fast food, Indian cuisine, ice cream, pastry
- Website: nirulas.com

Nirula's is India's oldest fast food restaurant chain. It was Delhi's first fast food restaurant, opening in Connaught Place in 1977. Today it has over 70 outlets in Delhi, Haryana, Punjab, and Uttar Pradesh, offering a "Desi" version of Western fast food items. Nirula's has branched out into other ventures which include ‘Potpourri’, an Indian cuisine casual dining restaurant chain and ‘Nirula's 21’, an ice cream parlour chain, in addition to pastry shops and two hotels in Noida and Panipat.

== History ==
The chain traces its origins to "Hotel India", which was opened at the L-Block in Connaught Place (CP), New Delhi in 1934, by the Nirula brothers, Lakshmi Chand Nirula and Madan Gopal Nirula; it had 12 rooms, a restaurant and a bar. In 1940, at the request of the Indian Coffee Board, they opened the Indian Coffee Shop on Queensway (now Janpath) introducing espresso coffee, which became an instant success. Soon afterwards they launched two theme restaurants —‘La Boheme’, a Hungarian restaurant; and ‘Gufa’, an Indian restaurant. In the 1950s, the 'Chinese Room' was opened, the oldest Chinese restaurant in Delhi. It is still in its original premises.

The 1970s saw Nirula's venturing into the fast food business with the opening of what became Delhi's first fast food restaurant in 1977, to which was later added: a pastry shop, snack bar, hot shoppe, and an ice cream parlour offering 21 flavours. A subsequent addition was the adjacent, waiter-served "Potpourri" salad bar. By that time Nirula's was already a landmark, offering Western fast food such as burgers, pizzas, and submarines.

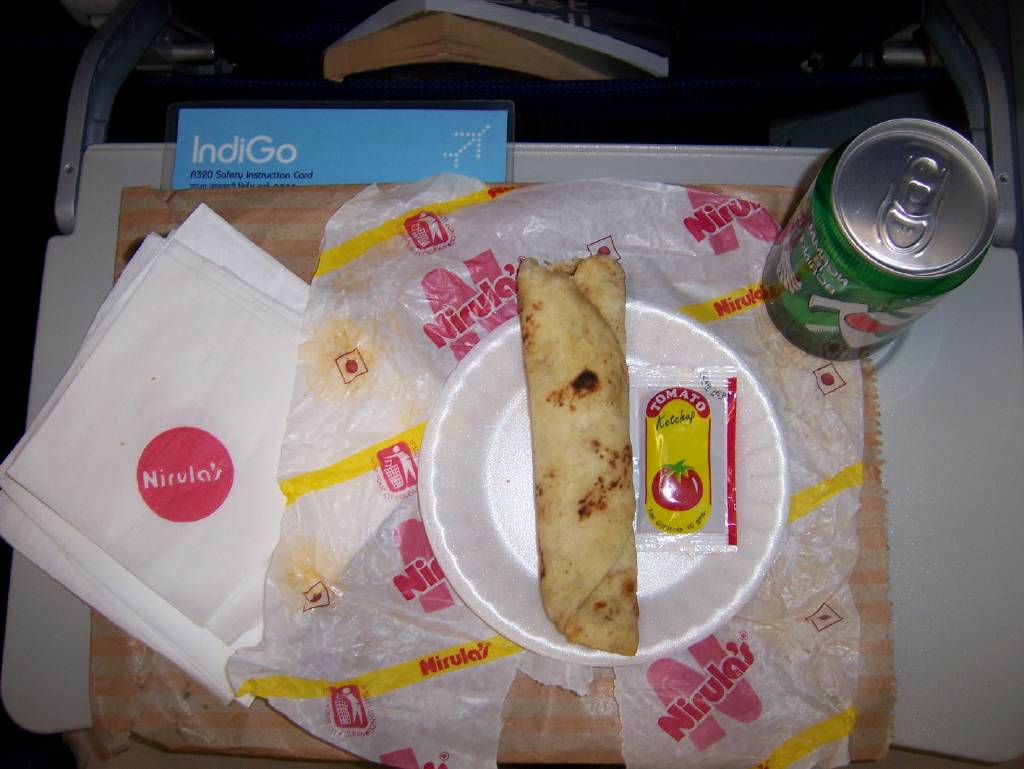
Nirula's kathi roll meal on an IndiGo flight

Expansion of the fast food business continued in the next two decades, with the opening of the ‘Central Kitchen’ and at the Chanakya cinema complex, Chanakyapuri, Defence Colony, Noida, Vasant Vihar, and various other locations in the NCR. Before the arrival of several international restaurant chains in the 1990s, Nirula's remained a major draw for young people in the capital. In the following years, even after chains like McDonald's made inroads into its market share, Nirula's retained 40 per cent of the Delhi fast food market in 2000. Facing stiff competition from Nirula's, McDonald's had to "Indianise" its menu to suit Indian palates, while for its part, Nirula's added competitive pricing and revamped its interiors.

To diversify its business, the group opened hotels, one in Noida and another in Panipat, and set up food processing plants in Noida, near Delhi.

Nirula's was also the first Western-style fast food restaurant in Kathmandu, Nepal, where it had two outlets, the main branch in Durbar Marg — where currently there is a KFC and a Pizza Hut as well — and a smaller branch on New Road. The best selling items were pizzas and ice cream. While both were already available in Kathmandu, they were offered at premium restaurants as gourmet versions and not as fast food. Through the 1990s Nirula's faced competition from local and international fast food outlets and by 1995 there was only one Nirula's left in the city. The quality also went down and it soon closed its doors for good.

== Recent Years and Revival Efforts ==
Although the entry of multinational fast-food chains later eroded some of its earlier dominance, Nirula’s remains in operation. As of 2023, the chain announced an aggressive expansion plan, reportedly targeting 250+ outlets across India.

== Acquisition ==
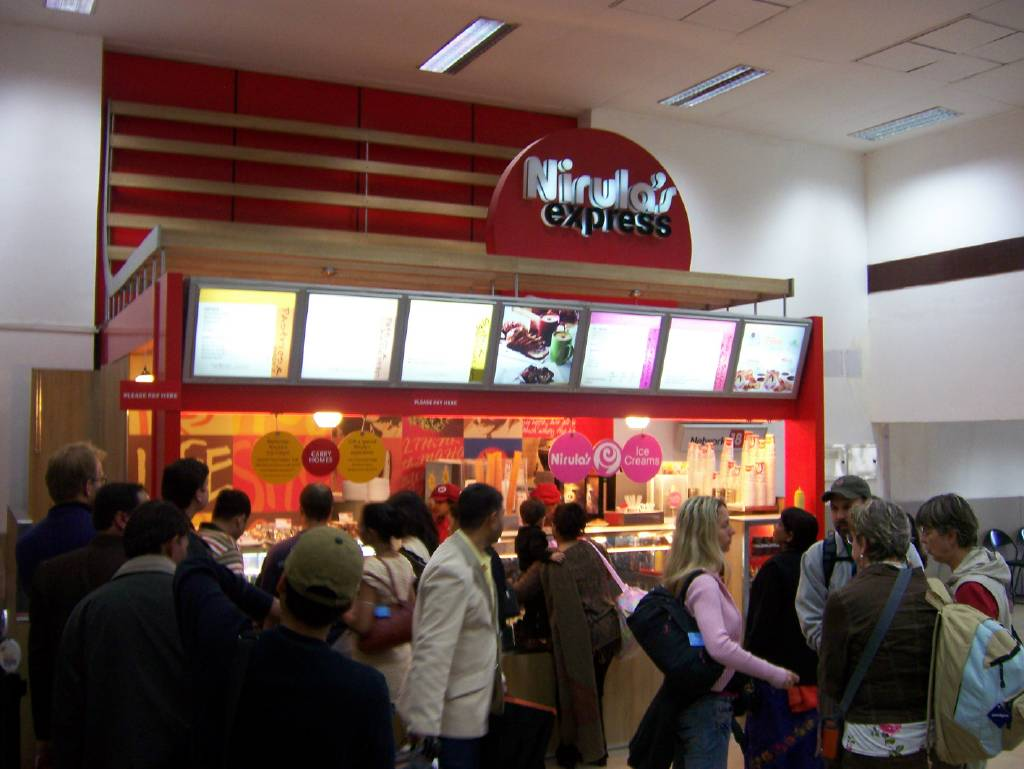
Nirula's express outlet at Delhi Airport

In 2006, Navis Capital Partners bought Nirula's. In 2007, the original Connaught Place outlet moved to K-Block, Connaught Place, while the adjacent Potpourri moved to N block, Outer Circle. Also in 2007, Nirula's opened India's first ice cream museum inside its ice cream factory in Noida. In the same year, the chain introduced three new outlet formats, including "Nirula's Express", Food Court Unit and Ice-Cream Kiosks, with the first Express outlet opening at the Delhi Airport.

In 2012, Navis agreed to sell its 100% stake in Nirula's Group to A2Z Excursions Pvt. Ltd for an undisclosed amount.

Today the chain has outlets across North India, in Delhi, Gurugram, Faridabad, Noida, Greater Noida, Ghaziabad, Kanpur, Lucknow, Bhiwadi, Dehradun, and Patna.

== Food items ==
- Hot chocolate fudge sundae
- 21 Love ice cream
- Banana split
- Lime ice - an ice cream soda
- Pineapple ice cream soda
- Chilli chicken pizza
- Chicken curry with naan
- Cakes and pastries
- Mutton sausage pizza

== Restaurant locations ==
- Delhi: Connaught Place, Roop Nagar, Lodhi Road, Hauz Khas, Amar Colony, Bhikaji Cama Place, Kirti Nagar, Dwarka, Janakpuri, Paschim Vihar, Greater Kailash Part II, Karol Bagh, New Friends Colony, Preet Vihar, Punjabi Bagh, Vasant Kunj, Vasant Vihar, Bhikaji Cama Place, Shahdara, Mayur Vihar
- Haryana: Faridabad, Gurugram, Bahadurgarh
- Uttar Pradesh: Noida, Greater Noida, Ghaziabad
- Uttarakhand: Mussoorie, Dehradun
- Bihar: Patna
- Punjab:Patiala

== Restaurant formats ==
- Nirula's 'family-style' outlets: quick service with take-away, home delivery and online ordering
- Nirula's Express: take away-only
- Fuel Station Outlets
- Potpourri: fully waiter served, multi-cuisine restaurant chain
- Nirula's 21: ice cream parlours
- Pegasus bar
