= Satya Pal Wahi =

Indian corporate executive, army officer, technocrat and writer

- Born: Khushab, British India
- Died: 13 February 2017
- Occupations: Corporate executive Army officer Writer
- Years active: 1950–2017
- Known for: Corporate management
- Children: Rakesh Wahi
- Awards: Padma Bhushan; Petrotech Lifetime Achievement Award; IGU Silver jubilee Award; Giants international Award

Satya Pal Wahi was an Indian corporate executive, army officer, technocrat, writer and a former chairman of public sector enterprises such as the Oil and Natural Gas Commission (ONGC) and the Cement Corporation of India (CCI). He was a member the Corps of EME and held the rank of a colonel. A recipient of the degree of Doctor of Science (honoris causa) from three Indian universities, Wahi also received honors such as the Petrotech Lifetime Achievement Award, the Indian Geophysical Union Silver jubilee Award and the Giants international Award. The Government of India awarded him the third highest civilian honour of the Padma Bhushan, in 1988, for his contributions to society.

== Biography ==
Satya Pal Wahi, born in Khushab, a small village near Lahore of the British India graduated in Electrical and Mechanical Engineering from Banaras Hindu University. Subsequently, he joined the Indian Military Academy, Dehradun, and after completing his training in 1950, served at the Corps of EME of the Indian Army, retiring from military service holding the rank of a colonel. During his stint with the army, he also worked with the Royal Electrical and Mechanical Engineers of the British Army for a while, and was stationed in UK and Germany. Later, he served many corporate enterprises which included Bokaro Steel Plant (1969–74), Bharat Heavy Electricals (BHEL) (1974–78), handling various portfolios, before joining Cement Corporation of India (CCI), a wholly owned company of the Government of India as its chairman. He is known to have turned the loss-making CCI into a profitable business enterprise and in 1981, he was appointed as the chairman of the Oil and Natural Gas Commission, the largest oil and gas exploration and production company in India, when Indira Gandhi was in power as Prime Minister.

Wahi chaired the organization, completing his first term in 1986, but was given extension by the Rajiv Gandhi government in 1986. However, the National Front Government which came to power in 1989 removed him from the post. His tenure at ONGC coincided with the oil find in Bombay High offshore oilfields and he has been credited with contributions in raising India's oil output from 9 million tonnes to 32 million tonnes per annum. His efforts are also reported behind the modernization of the organization by the introduction of computerization and modern office facilities and the establishment of a training centre for the organization. After his stint at ONGC, he was associated with Bharat Ophthalmic Glass Limited and served as the Chairman of the Standing Committee of Public Enterprises (SCOPE). He was a former director of public sector undertakings such as Mishra Dhatu Nigam, Malabar Cement Limited and UP Cements, a former member of the governing councils of the Council of Scientific and Industrial Research (CSIR), Administrative Staff College of India, Indian Institute of Management, Calcutta and Indian Institute of Technology, Delhi and a former member of the Public Enterprises Selection Board. He was a board member of the Foundation for Organisational Research and Education and chaired two management organizations, Capital Management Advisors and SP Wahi Management & Technology Consultants. His autobiography, Leading from the Front: From Army to Corporate World, published in 2008, is reported to have details about the political interference and bureaucratic malpractices prevalent in the Indian industrial sector during that period.

== Awards and honors ==
Satya Pal Wahi was honored by the Indian School of Mines with the degree of Doctor of Science (honoris causa) in 1985 and Roorkee University (the present-day Indian Institute of Technology Roorkee) and his alma mater, Banaras Hindu University followed suit with DSc degrees in 1987 and 1989 respectively. The Government of India awarded him the civilian honor of the Padma Bhushan in 1988. In 1989, he received two awards, the Giants international Award and the Lifetime Achievement Award of the Indian Geophysical Union. During the 7th International Oil and Gas Conference and Exhibition (Petrotech-2007) held in New Delhi, he was awarded the Petrotech Lifetime Achievement Award.

== See also ==
- Indian Army Corps of EME
- Oil and Natural Gas Commission
