= Deepak Nirula =

Indian businessman (1952–2022)

Deepak Nirula (3 April 1952 – 4 October 2022) was an Indian businessman who founded Nirula's, India's first fast-food chain store. He was educated at The Doon School and then completed his bachelor of science in hotel management from Cornell University in 1974. He has been recognized for pioneering the fast food concept in India before the entry of McDonald's or KFC in the country. He was listed as a noteworthy food service executive by 'Marquis Who's Who'.

Nirula died on 4 October 2022, in New Delhi.
