= Sanjay Khosla =

American university professor

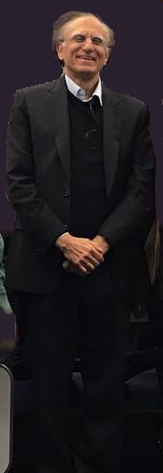
Prof. Sanjay Khosla

Sanjay Khosla is a senior fellow at Kellogg School of Management, Northwestern University, and a senior advisor at Boston Consulting Group.

Khosla was president, developing markets of Kraft Foods (now Mondelez International) from Jan 2007 to March 2013. During his tenure Kraft Foods employed 65,000 employees in over 60 countries and operated brands like Cadbury, Oreo, Milka, Trident. During his tenure, Khosla:

- Grew the business from $5 billion to $16 billion in six years while improving profitability and cash flow
- Transformed brands like Oreo from $200 million to a $1 billion and Tang from $500 million to $1 billion in six years in developing markets
- Helped spearhead and successfully integrate the acquisition of Cadbury (bought for $20 billion) and Danone biscuits (bought for $7.8 billion)

Prior to joining Kraft Foods, Khosla turned around the $3 billion consumer business of Fonterra, a global dairy company based in New Zealand. Prior to his tenure at Fonterra, Khosla had 27-year tenure with Unilever based in the UK, Europe and India. Khosla implemented a programme "paint the World Yellow with Lipton" as chairman of the Global Category Board for Unilever Beverages. Khosla also created the Wheel detergents business in India.

Khosla is on the board of Zoetis Inc (previously Pfizer animal health), NIIT Ltd, India, and Iconix Brand Group. Khosla was previously on the Board of Best Buy Inc, Del Monte Foods, and Hindustan Unilever; co-chair of the Nestle/Fonterra joint venture for the Americas; and on the board of the Lipton/Pepsi joint venture.

Khosla has lectured at universities in the U.S. and in forums such as the Economist conference in London and Davos.

Khosla co-authored a book, Fewer, Bigger, Bolder, with Mohanbir Sawhney. The book discusses Focus7 which is a "proven framework for achieving sustained profitable growth."
