= Rakesh Wahi =

Indian entrepreneur

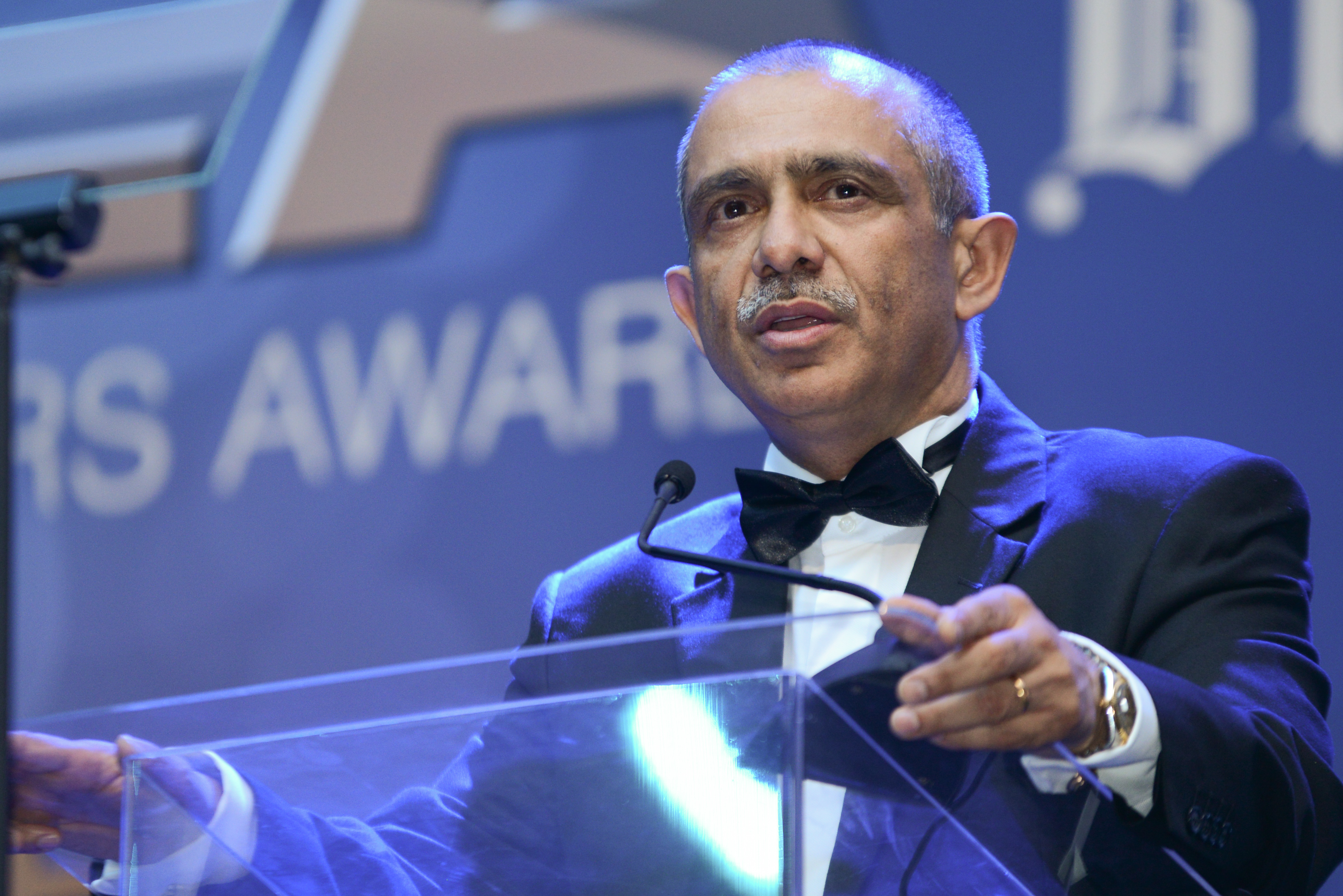
- Wahi in 2014
- Born: 3 October 1959 (age 66); New Delhi, India
- Education: Bachelor of Science, National Defence Academy, 1979; Bachelor of Technology, Civil Engineering from College of Military Engineering, 1986
- Occupations: Chairman of CMA Investment Holdings; Vice Chairman of CNBC Africa; Publisher of Forbes Africa
- Known for: Founder of ABN Group
- Father: Satya Pal Wahi
- Awards: Vishisht Seva Medal

Rakesh Wahi is an Indian military veteran, author and entrepreneur active in Africa and the Middle East. He is the Chairman of CMA Investment Holdings, a company he started to incubate his startups in media, technology and education. He is the co-founder of CNBC Africa, Forbes Africa Magazine, Transnational Academic Group, and Curtin University Dubai.

== Early life and education ==
Wahi was born in on 3 October 1959, in New Delhi to Satya Pal Wahi, an army officer and a Padma Bhushan recipient, and Shobana (Kukreja) Wahi. He got his early education from the Doon School in India. He completed his Bachelor of Science degree from the National Defence Academy in 1979 and Bachelor of Technology degree in Civil Engineering from College of Military Engineering in 1986.

Mr. Wahi was awarded with an Honorary Doctorate Degree of Science from the International University of Management by the Minister of Education of Namibia, and he is also a fellow member of the Australian Institute of Management, Western Australia.

== Professional career ==
Rakesh joined the Corps of Engineers in the Indian Army in 1980 and served for eight years before leaving in 1988. He was awarded the Vishisht Seva Medal by the President of India in 1985. In 1989 he moved to Dubai. He is the co-founder of the Transnational Academic Group which operates Lancaster University Ghana, Murdoch University Dubai, and Curtin University Dubai.

Rakesh has authored the book Be a Lion: Dare to Dream and Live Fearlessly, which was published in 2018.

== See also ==
- List of The Doon School alumni
- CNBC Africa
