= Shantanu Khosla =

Indian business executive

- Citizenship: India
- Education: IIM Calcutta, IIT BOMBAY
- Occupation: MD of P&G India

Shantanu Khosla is an Indian business executive. He is the former managing director of Procter & Gamble (P&G) India. As managing director, he was the country head of P&G for India and led operations for all three P&G companies in the country: two listed as Procter & Gamble Hygiene and Health Care Limited and Gillette India Limited, as well as a 100% subsidiary of the parent company called Procter & Gamble Home Products.

Khosla is an alumnus of Indian Institute of Technology Bombay and Indian Institute of Management Calcutta (IIM Calcutta). After completing his MBA from IIM Calcutta in 1983, he joined Richardson Hindustan Ltd. as a management trainee. He became a part of P&G when it acquired Richardson Hindustan in 1985. In his long tenure at P&G, Khosla has led several business units around the globe. He took over the leadership of India operations of the company in June 2002. He resigned from P&G effective 30 June 2015.

Khosla is a member of the board of governors of the Advertising Standards Council of India.
