= Inder Pal Khosla =

Indian diplomat

Indian representative to Bhutan
- In office 1974–1975

Indian Charge d'Affaires to Saudi Arabia
- In office 1975–1976

Indian Ambassador to United Arab Emirates
- In office 1976–1980

Indian High Commissioner to Bangladesh
- In office November 1982 – July 15, 1985

Indian High Commissioner to Australia
- In office Feb 1985 – 1989

Indian Ambassador to Afghanistan
- In office 1989–1990

Indian Ambassador to Iran
- In office 1990–1992

Indian Ambassador to Netherlands
- In office 1992–1992

Personal details
- Born: March 26, 1938 (age 88) Lahore

Inder Pal Khosla is a retired Indian diplomat. He served as the Indian High Commissioner to Bangladesh and Afghanistan.

- Son of Shakuntala and Justice GD Khosla.
- Has two daughters
- Education: 1954: The Doon School BA, MA (Econ).
- In 1960 joined Indian Foreign Service.
- Served in Vienna (1963), Algiers, Thimphu, Dhaka and Kabul.
- 1974: India's representative at Bhutan.
- 1975-1976: Charge d'Affaires in Jeddah, (Saudi Arabia).
- 1976-1980: Ambassador to United Arab Emirates.
- Feb 1980-Jan 1985: Jt Sec, Master of ceremonies Ministry of External Affairs (India).
- Jan 1985-July 15, 1985: High Commissioner to Dhaka Bangladesh.
- July 15, 1985-1989: High Commissioner to Canberra Australia.
- 1989-1990: Ambassador to Kabul Afghanistan.
- 1990-1992: Ambassador to Iran.
- 1992:Ambassador to Netherlands.
- 1993-Jan 1995: at Mohammad Hamid Ansari Permanent Representative of India to the United Nations

== Bibliography ==
- India and the Gulf by Inder Pal Khosla, Konark Publishers 2009, ISBN 9788122007435.
