= Manoviraj Khosla =

Indian fashion designer

- Born: Bengaluru, India
- Education: The Doon School; St. Xavier's College, Kolkata; American College for the Applied Arts, London
- Occupations: Fashion designer Costume designer
- Years active: 1990-present
- Known for: Fashion design, costume design
- Website: www.manovirajkhosla.com

Manoviraj Khosla is an Indian fashion designer based in Bengaluru who retails under his eponymous label. He also works as a costume designer, whose work has featured in Indian films like Lessons in Forgetting.

== Education ==
Khosla was educated at The Doon School in Dehradun, and then got a bachelor's degree in commerce from. St. Xavier's College, Kolkata. He then went to study fashion design at the American College for the Applied Arts in London.

== Work ==
Khosla launched his label in 1990, first producing menswear and later expanding to include womenswear. In 1995, Khosla launched his first 'Kingfisher Line' in association with the UB Group. The Kingfisher Line was later reinterpreted and launched in different versions in 2003 and 2010. In 2011, Khosla showcased his line at the first Force India Octane Nights fashion show. Khosla's style draws inspiration from both Indian and Western aesthetics, and focuses on experimenting with various cuts and fabrics. In contrast to luxury Indian couture labels, Khosla ensures affordability of the pieces produced under his label.
