= CNBC Africa =

African TV channel

- Country: South Africa
- Broadcast area: African continent
- Headquarters: Johannesburg, South Africa

Programming
- Picture format: 4:3 576i SDTV

Ownership
- Owner: Africa Business News

History
- Launched: 1 June 2007

Links
- Website: cnbcafrica.com

Availability

Terrestrial
- DStv: Channel 410

Streaming media
- cnbcafrica.com: www.cnbcafrica.com

Consumer News and Business Channel Africa (known as CNBC Africa) is an African pay television network launched on 1 June 2007. Founded by Rakesh Wahi and Zafar Siddiqi, the network is produced under license from CNBC International and is owned by Africa Business News. It is headquartered in Sandton, Johannesburg.

The channel features programmes and updates from CNBC Europe, the Middle East, India, Pakistan, the US and other CNBC affiliates around the world.

== Bureaus ==
Former logo used from 2007 until 2024

Former logo used from 2024 until 2025

Bureaus for CNBC Africa are located in:

- Abuja
- Cape Town
- Johannesburg
- Lagos
- London
- Lusaka
- Maputo
- Nairobi
- Windhoek
- Kigali
- Mauritius

The channel produces 7 hours of local programming per business day. Local content is generated in the studios in Sandton, Johannesburg.

The Arabic Business Programmes Show for:

- Cairo
- Casablanca
- Khartoum

== Shows ==
- Against All Odds
- Banking The Future
- Crypto Trader
- Here for Africa
- Political Capital
- Young Money
- Angola Changing The Narrative
- Business Spotlight
- Business This Week
- Buy Africa
- Captains of Industry
- Chivas Win The Right Way
- The Mentorship Challenge
- Closing Gate
- Currency Wars
- Deal Flow
- Doing Business in Botswana
- Doing Business in Rwanda
- Driving Forward
- Economic Lifelines Nigeria
- Eye on Gauteng
- Eye on Kenya
- Eye on KZN
- Eye on MDG Nigeria
- Eye on Nigeria's Capital Markets
- Eye on Rivers
- Finweek
- Gurus
- Hot Stocks
- Inside Her C-Suite
- Invest Africa
- It's Africa's Time
- Kicking Doors
- Latitude
- Marketing Media Money
- Masters of Innovation
- Money Talks
- My Worst Day
- Nigeria Going Beyond Oil
- On the Couch
- Open Exchange
- Personal Finance
- Political Capital
- Relish
- Resource Watch
- Share Shootout
- Silver Screen
- Talking Stocks
- Tech @ Work
- Unstoppable
- Women on Wealth

== Regular expert contributors ==
- Bruce Whitfield
- Paul Theron

== Awards ==
- 2009: CNBC Africa received the Best Television Feature 2009 for the programme "Doing Business in Africa" at the Diageo Africa Business Reporting Awards.
- 2009: CNBC Africa producer and reporter, Talia Sanhewe, was the winner of the Vodacom Journalist of the Year 2009 Western Region Television News Category.
- 2010: CNBC Africa won the Banking Reporting Category of the Africa investor Financial Reporting Awards 2010. The channel was nominated in both the 'Ai Financial News Reporting - Banking' and 'Ai Financial News Reporting - Resources (Mining, Energy, Oil & Gas)' categories.
- 2010: CNBC Africa received the Broadcast Award at the Sanlam Awards for Excellence in Financial Journalism 2010
- 2010: Producer Natascha Jacobsz-Botha was the winner of the Citadel 'Words on Money' Journalism Awards 'Newcomer of the Year 2010'.
- 2010: CNBC Africa was nominated for 'Best Infrastructure Feature' and 'Best Tourism Feature' at the Diageo Africa Business Reporting Awards 2010.
