= Thapar (surname) =

Thapar is an Indian surname.

== Notable people ==
Notable people bearing the surname Thapar include:

- Amrita Thapar (born 1984), Indian model, Miss India 2005
- Anita Thapar, Welsh child psychiatrist
- Amul Thapar (born 1969), Federal Judge of the United States Court of Appeals for the Sixth Circuit
- Anita Thapar, Welsh psychiatrist
- B. K. Thapar (1921–1995), Indian archaeologist
- Daya Ram Thapar (1894–1965), Indian Army medical officer
- Gautam Thapar (born 1960), Indian businessman
- Karam Chand Thapar (1900–1962), Indian businessman and founder of the Thapar Group of companies
- Karan Thapar (born 1955), Indian journalist and television interviewer, son of General P. N. Thapar
- Kavya Thapar (born 1995), Indian film actress and model
- L. M. Thapar (1930–2007), head of L. M. Thapar group of companies, son of Karam Chand Thapar
- Meenakshi Thapar (1984–2012), Indian actress
- Namita Thapar (born 1977), Indian businesswoman
- General Pran Nath Thapar (1906–1975), fifth Chief of Army Staff of the Indian Army
- Prem Nath Thapar (1903–1969), Indian bureaucrat and administrator
- Romesh Thapar (1922–1987), Indian journalist and political commentator
- Romila Thapar (born 1931), Indian historian, sister of Romesh Thapar
- Sooraj Thapar, Indian actor
- Sukhdev Thapar (1907–1931), Indian freedom fighter
- Valmik Thapar (1952–2025), Indian conservationist and natural historian, son of Romesh Thapar
- Vishal Thapar (born 1994), Indian sabre fencer

== See also ==
- Thapar family, Indian business family
