= Frederick Button =

British architect (1901–1969)

Frederick C. Button ARIBA (1901 – 1969) was a British architect, the co-founder of Adie, Button and Partners.

== Career ==
Born 1901, Button was mentored by Thomas Wallis of Wallis, Gilbert and Partners. By 1934, Button was an ARIBA and one of five partners in the firm, and "in charge of the execution of all plans and drawings".

With George Adie he co-founded Adie, Button and Partners. Notable buildings designed by the firm include the Park Lane Hotel in Piccadilly, the art deco apartment block at 59-63 Princes Gate, South Kensington (1937-8), the 1930s Charters House, in Sunningdale, Berkshire, which was used as a country retreat by Edward, Duke of Windsor and Wallis Simpson, and the Stockwell garage, which opened in April 1952. He died in 1969, aged 67 or 68.
