= CG Power and Industrial Solutions =

Indian power and industrial solutions company

CG Power and Industrial Solutions Limited
- Type: Public
- Traded as: BSE: 500093; NSE: CGPOWER
- Industry: Electrical
- Founded: 1937; 89 years ago
- Founders: R. E. B. Crompton; James Greaves
- Headquarters: Mumbai, Maharashtra, India
- Products: Transformers, pump, HT & LT Motors, DC Motors, Railway Signaling
- Revenue: ₹14,013 crore (US$1.5 billion) (2015)
- Parent: Murugappa Group
- Subsidiaries: G.G. Tronics

CG Power and Industrial Solutions Limited, also known as Crompton Greaves Limited, is an Indian multinational company engaged in design, manufacturing, and marketing of products related to power generation, transmission, and distribution, as well as rail transportation. The company is based in Mumbai and has been part of the Chennai-based Murugappa Group since 2020, when it was acquired from the Avantha Group. The company was restructured in 2016 following the demerger of its consumer goods business.

== History ==
Col. R. E. B. Crompton founded R.E.B. Crompton & Company in 1878. The company was merged with F.A. Parkinson in 1927 to form Crompton Parkinson Ltd. Greaves Cotton and Company, established by James Greaves in 1859, was appointed as their concessionaire in India.

The company was incorporated on 28 April 1937 as Crompton Parkinson Work Private Limited. In 1947, it was acquired by Karam Chand Thapar of Thapar Group. The company went public in 1960 and changed its name to Crompton Greaves Limited in 1966.

The company in Cold War era collaborated with the USSR and the Eastern Bloc for technology transfer of new electrical technologies.

In July 2014, Crompton Greaves Limited announced plans to demerge the company in order to separate its consumer goods business from the power and industrial systems segment. The demerger was completed in 2016 with the listing of Crompton Greaves Consumer Electricals Limited (CGCEL) and Gautam Thapar selling his 34% stake in CGCEL to Advent International and Temasek Holdings for ₹ 2,000 crore.

In January 2017, Crompton Greaves changed its name from Crompton Greaves Limited to CG Power and Industrial Solutions Limited.

In August 2019, CG Power and Industrial Solutions reported that its employees had carried out unauthorised transactions resulting in an "understatement of the company's liabilities" by thousands of crores in the previous financial year.

In September 2020, Murugappa Group's Tube Investments acquired a 56% stake in CG Power and Industrial Solutions for ₹ 700 crore.

== Products and services ==
- MV Switchgear
  - VCB, PCVCB, GIS & RMU, all Rail Transportation Equipments like Traction Motors, Converters, cubicles, Relays, Point machines etc.

== Awards ==
- Received NABL accreditation for 5 of its labs & 1 calibration lab.
