= George Adie =

British architect

George Mountford Adie (14 January 1901 – 29 July 1989) was a British architect, the co-founder (with Frederick Button) of Adie, Button and Partners in Mayfair, London.

George Mountford Adie was born in the UK on 14 January 1901. He started as a stockbroker, before switching to architecture, and co-founding Adie, Button and Partners in 1933. Notable buildings designed by the firm include the Park Lane Hotel in Piccadilly, the art deco apartment block at 59-63 Princes Gate, South Kensington (1937-8), the 1930s mansion Charters House in Sunningdale, Berkshire, which was used as a country retreat by Edward, Duke of Windsor and Wallis Simpson, and Stockwell bus garage, which opened in April, 1952.

Adie married the concert pianist and composer Helen Perkin in 1935. Three children were born before 1940. After the war they visited the Russian mystic George Gurdjieff in Paris and became active in the Gurdjieff spiritual movement, first in London, and (from 1965) in Sydney, Australia, where they emigrated and remained for the rest of their lives. They established the Gurdjieff Society of Newport.
