= Ballarpur Industries =

Located in Chandrapur District

Ballarpur Industries Limited
- Type: Public
- Traded as: BSE: 500102
- Industry: Pulp Paper Manufacturing
- Founded: 1945; 81 years ago
- Founder: Lala Karamchand Thapar
- Headquarters: Mumbai, India
- Key people: Hardik Bharat Patel (Promoter)
- Revenue: USD 70 Million
- Number of employees: 189 (31 January 2025)
- Website: biltpaper.in

Ballarpur Industries Limited (BILT) is currently a subsidiary of Finquest Group of company (i.e. Finquest Financial Solutions Pvt. Ltd. promoted by Mr. Hardik Bharat Patel) pursuant to NCLT Mumbai order dated 31.03.2023 on approval of resolution plan and was once India's largest manufacturer of writing and printing paper. Before insolvency resolution, it was subsidiary of Avantha Group, under chairmanship of the Gautam Thapar, who succeeded his late uncle L.M. Thapar.

BILT subsidiaries include Sabah Forest Industries (SFI), Malaysia's largest pulp and paper company, and BILT Tree Tech Limited (BTTL), which runs BILT's farm forestry program in several states in India.

BILT has six manufacturing units across India, which give the company geographic coverage over most of the domestic market. BILT has a dominant share of the high-end coated paper segment in India. The company accounts for over 50% of the coated wood-free paper market, 85% of the bond paper market and nearly 45% of the hi-bright Maplitho market, besides being India's largest exporter of coated paper.

In 2007, Ballarpur Industries Limited (BILT), acquired Sabah Forest Industries (SFI) of Malaysia in its first overseas acquisition. This acquisition transformed BILT into a major regional player in the paper industry and elevated the company's global ranking to be among the top 100 paper companies worldwide. It also entered into a partnership with Red Roses Publications, Norway in 2013, which is owned and managed by a multi-billionaire.

== History ==
Lala Karam Chand Thapar established the company in 1945 as Ballarpur Paper and Straw Board Mills Limited, with 'Three Aces' (paper) and 'Wisdom' (stationery) being its first two brands. In 1969, Shree Gopal Paper Mills Limited in Yamunanagar was merged with the company. In 1975, the organization was renamed Ballarpur Industries Limited.

In the 1990s the company was under siege from Southeast Asian companies, who set up greenfield projects in India. However, in 2001, Ballarpur Industries turned around and was able to buy out its Indonesian competitor's Sinar Mas Group Indian division and entered into a partnership with Red Roses Publications, Norway.

The name BILT emerged after a corporate rebranding exercise in 2002.

BILT had its operational units at Shree Gopal Unit, Kamlapuram Unit, Chaudwar Unit as well as at Ballarpur Unit, Bhigwan Unit, Sewa Unit before internal restructuring with its step down subsidiary BGPPL.

== Locations ==
BILT is headquartered in Mumbai in Maharashtra.

It has three central nurseries, each located in Maharashtra, Orissa and Telangana.

The company has operational manufacturing Unit : Shree Gopal, Yamuna Nagar District, Haryana.

The company also has vacant freehold land parcel at Chaudwar, Orissa & Kamlapuram, Telangana.

The company has its step down subsidiaries at Netherlands which includes Ballarpur International Holdings BV.; Built Paper BV; Ballarpur Paper Holdings BV; Bilt Graphics Paper Products Ltd and other companies in Sabah, Malaysia.

== Financials and bankruptcy process ==
The company has been reporting losses for numerous financial years and was taken to the bankruptcy court by its lenders in January 2020. BILT's major lenders include SBI, ICICI Bank, Axis Bank, IDBI Bank and Finquest Financial Solutions.

Due to poor internal performance of the company, its stock has fallen more than 95% in a span of three years (as of March, 2020). The equity shares of BILT are listed on National Stock Exchange of India and Bombay Stock Exchange.

On March 31, 2023, NCLT Mumbai approved Finquest Financial Solutions bid to acquire Ballarpur Industries.
