= R. E. B. Crompton =

British engineer (1845–1940)

R. E. B. Crompton CB FRS
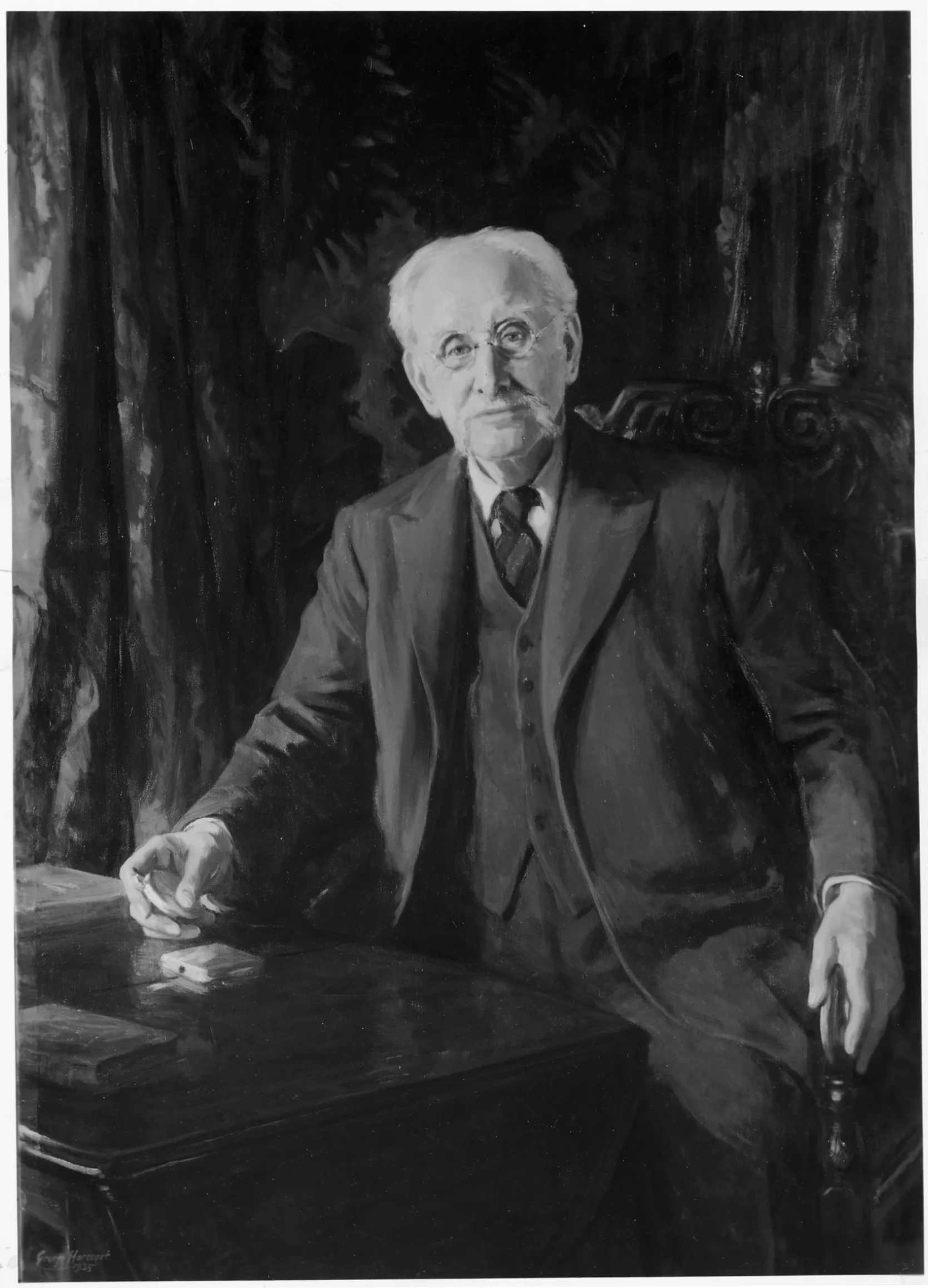
- Colonel R. E. B. Crompton
- Born: Rookes Evelyn Bell Crompton; 31 May 1845; Sion Hill, Thirsk, Yorkshire, England
- Died: 15 February 1940 (aged 94); North Yorkshire, England
- Citizenship: British
- Education: Elstree School; Harrow School; Royal Military College, Sandhurst
- Occupations: Electrical engineer, industrialist, inventor
- Years active: 1870s–1929
- Employer: Crompton & Co.
- Organizations: Institution of Electrical Engineers (two times President)Royal Automobile Club (founder member)
- Known for: Pioneer of electric lighting and power supply systems
- Notable work: Founder of Crompton & Co. Honory Colonel, London Electrical Engineers
- Board member of: International Electrotechnical Commission (founder member)
- Awards: Faraday Medal (1926); Company of the Bath (1901)
Military career
- Military career
- Allegiance: United Kingdom
- Branch: British Army
- Service years: 1864-1910
- Rank: Colonel
- Units: Rifle Brigade (The Prince Consort's Own); Royal Engineers
- Conflicts: Second Boer War

Rookes Evelyn Bell Crompton, CB, FRS (31 May 1845 – 15 February 1940) was an English electrical engineer, industrialist and inventor. He was a pioneer of electric lighting and public electricity supply systems. The company he formed, Crompton & Co., was one of the world's first large-scale manufacturers of electrical equipment. He was also an early campaigner for an international standard for electrical systems. He was involved with both the practical and academic sides of his discipline, being a founder member of the International Electrotechnical Commission and twice president of the Institution of Electrical Engineers. He was a fellow of the Royal Society and a founder member of the Royal Automobile Club.

== Early life ==
Evelyn Crompton was born at Sion Hill, near Thirsk, Yorkshire, one of five children. From an early age he was interested in machines and engineering. His autobiography tells how a trip to the Great Exhibition aged 6 had a profound impact on him:

For me, the unforgettable part and focus of the whole exhibition was the Machinery Hall … neither Koh-I-Noor diamond, nor Osler's crystal fountain … had any attractions for me to compare with those of the locomotives, with their brilliantly polished piston rods and brasses burnished like gold.

His schooling started at Sharow, near Ripon in Yorkshire, along with 19 other boys, aged between 7 and 15. In 1856 he went to school at Elstree, and then on to Harrow (1858–60).

== Early life and education ==
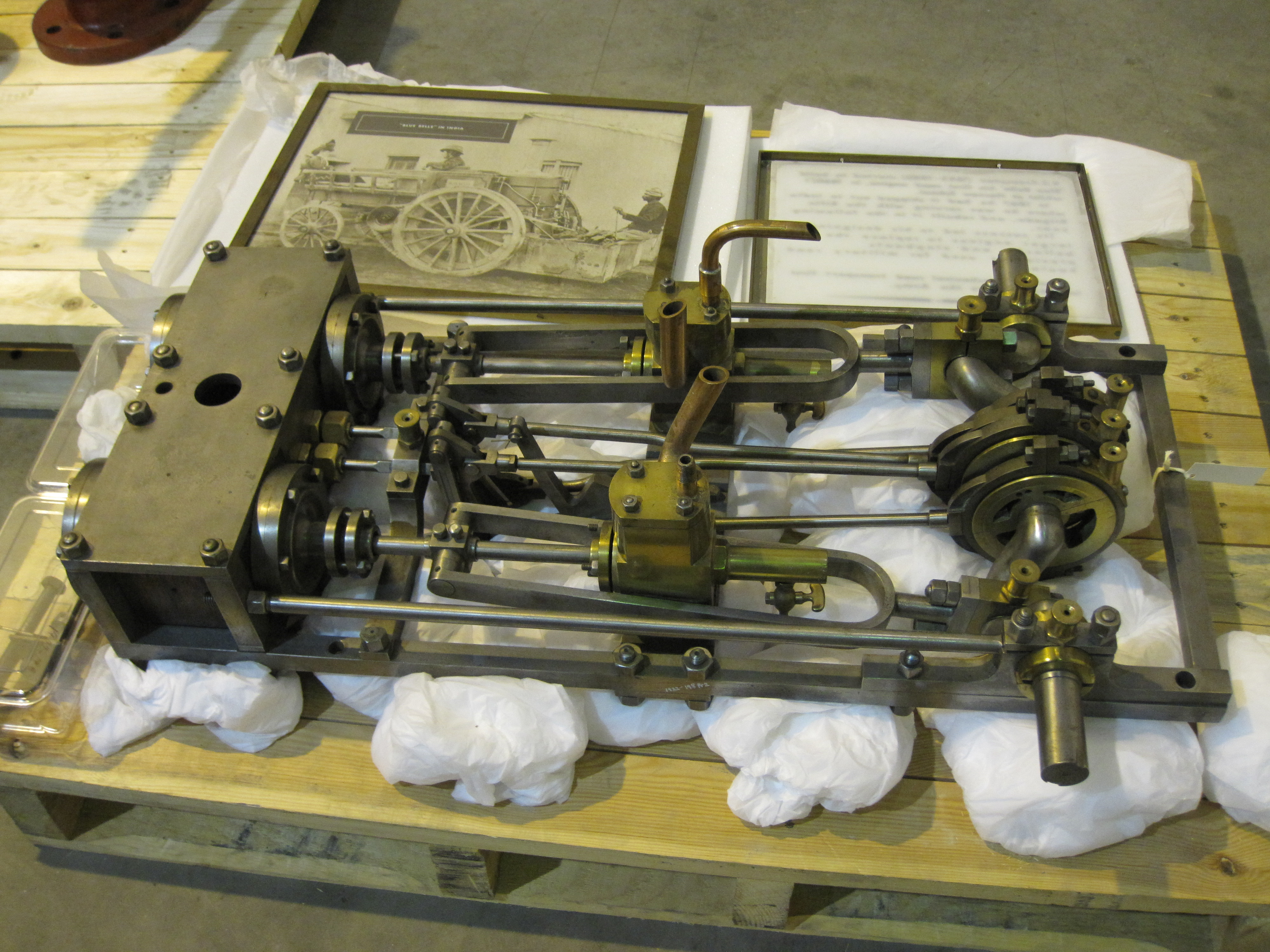
The engine of Crompton's Blue Belle road steamer or Road Locomotive The Science Museum Wroughton Wilts.

Crompton's education was interrupted by the outbreak of the Crimean War in 1854 and he was keen to see action, despite his young age. In mid-1856, after the conclusion of the war, he travelled to the Crimea on HMS Dragon and visited his brother in what had been the front line. Thereafter, he was awarded British Crimean War Medal and Sebastopol Clasp.

After the Crimea, Crompton returned to Britain and went to Harrow School. He eschewed the school's highly classical education, decided to study extra mathematics. He built his own static electricity generator and performed experiments with Leyden Jars. During a summer holiday, he designed and built a road-going steam tractor called Bluebell.

From Harrow Crompton obtained a placement at the Doncaster Works of the Great Northern Railway where he received theoretical education and practical experience in engineering. However Crompton still favoured the military life and in 1864 joined the British Army and served in the Rifle Brigade in India. Whilst there, he witnessed the work of the Royal Engineers building narrow gauge railways and developed a deep interest in steam traction. He had Bluebell shipped to him from Britain and convinced his superiors to adopt traction engines and steam lorries for transporting cargo instead of bullock-drawn carts. He designed some of the military steam wagons himself.

== Crompton & Co. ==
Crompton returned from India in 1875 and decided to pursue his interest in engineering. He became a partner and manager at T.H.P. Dennis & Co., an engineering company building agricultural mills and heating plant in Chelmsford. In this capacity, and as a family favour, he designed a new mechanical foundry for an iron and steel business owned by his brother. To maximise efficiency, the mill was to run day and night, requiring the best possible lighting. Crompton designed and oversaw the installation of an arc lamp system. He even designed his own improvements to the dynamo built by Emil Bürgin in Switzerland.

Crompton became convinced of the future of electric lighting, and at the same time saw several faults in the French-developed arc lamps then in use. He developed his own design which gave a much brighter and steadier light than existing types. His faith in his design was such that he bought out T.H.P. Dennis and in 1878 Crompton & Co. was formed to manufacture, sell and install Crompton's lamp. His reputation quickly spread, to the extent that when Joseph Swan was developing his incandescent light bulb, he consulted Crompton over its design. Soon Crompton was building Swan's light bulb under license and the company dominated the British lighting market.

By 1881, the company's range had included to cover complete electrical systems. Crompton designed and manufactured dynamos, switchgear, circuit breakers, motors and electric meters, as well as lamps. Crompton gave demonstrations of his lamps at highly public events such as the Henley Regatta and at the Alexandra Palace. He installed lights at Windsor Castle and King's Cross station as well numerous country houses, factories, tram networks, railway yards and docks. Foreign jobs included lighting the Vienna State Opera, which became the world's first theatre to be lit by electricity.

In 1887 Crompton designed and installed one of the world's first public electricity supplies using a centralised power station. Installed on the Kensington Gardens estate in London, seven steam engines coupled to Crompton dynamos supplied power from a cavern. The success of this installation led to numerous orders for similar systems worldwide. Crompton supplied equipment throughout the British Empire, with power stations being built as far aways as Australia, which received its first Crompton lighting plant in 1887. In 1899, the company installed a generator set in a Calcutta hotel, producing India's first ever electricity supply. India became a significant market for Crompton & Co., and he appointed an agent in Calcutta to manage his business in the subcontinent. Similar subsidiaries were later founded worldwide.

Crompton kept a very 'hands on' approach to his business. In 1895 a fire broke out in a power station in London that his company had installed and that was close to his own home. He rushed to the scene and helped workers to try to contain the blaze and prevent it reaching some tanks of fuel oil. As the fire continued to spread, he went back to his home and helped man-handle firehoses through his front door, across his floors and out the back windows, which faced out to the rear of the power station. He continued to help fight the fire, despite receiving several electric shocks and mild burns from a flooded battery bank.

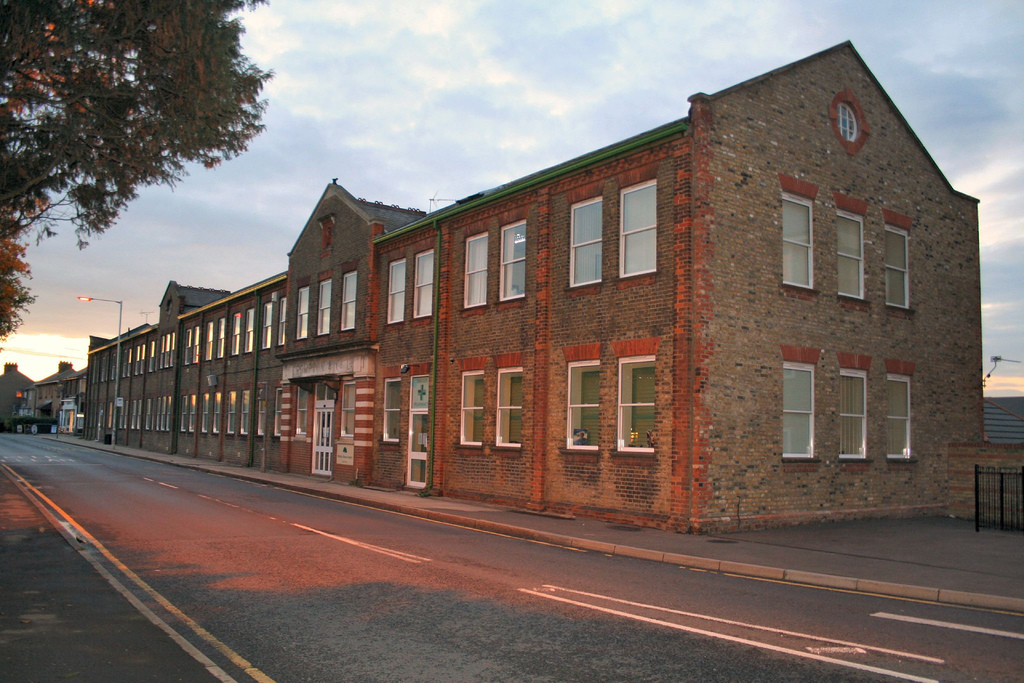
Arc Works, Writtle Road, Chelmsford 2007

At the site of the former Crompton Parkinson Works (later Marconi and E2V) at Writtle Road in Chelmsford, the Crompton Building still exists, although it is now used an NHS surgery, pharmacist and residential flats. The housing development that is located on part of the former works has roads named Rookes Crescent, Evelyn Place and Crompton Street. There are numerous stone plaques in the buildings which record the achievements of Crompton and others. Nearby, there is also road named Cromar Way, which derives its name from a contraction of 'Crompton' and 'Marconi'.

== Volunteers and the Boer War ==
When the Electrical Engineers, Royal Engineers (Volunteers) was formed in 1897, Crompton became Commanding Officer with the rank of major. He designed a range of searchlights for military use, ranging from small tripod-mounted types to large fixed designs using his own arc lamp design. Early in the Second Boer War, Colonel Robert Baden-Powell improvised searchlights to deter night attacks during the Siege of Mafeking. Soon afterward Crompton led a detachment of the Electrical Engineers Volunteers to South Africa where they operated electric searchlights, the first use of such equipment by the Royal Engineers on campaign. The detachment served from April to October 1900 in the Transvaal and Orange Free State. Crompton was promoted to lieutenant-colonel, mentioned in dispatches, made a Companion of the Bath for his efforts and was later given the honorary rank of colonel. Crompton continued as CO of the London Division of the Electrical Engineers Volunteers, and its successor the London Electrical Engineers, RE. He retired from the Territorial Force in 1910, but was appointed Honorary Colonel of the London Electrical Engineers in 1911, and of its successor, 27th (London Electrical Engineers) Battalion, RE, in 1923.

== Standardisation ==
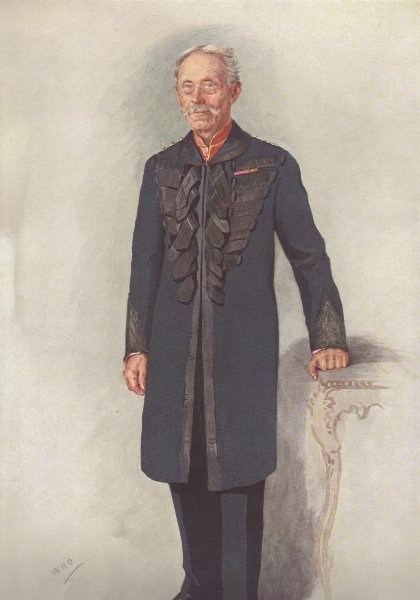
"The Road Builder" Crompton as caricatured in Vanity Fair, August 1911

After the war, Crompton became concerned by the large range of different standards and systems used by electrical engineering companies and scientists. Many companies had entered the market in the 1890s and all chose their own settings for voltage, frequency, current and even the symbols used on circuit diagrams. Adjacent buildings would have totally incompatible electrical systems simply because they had been fitted out by different companies. Crompton could see the lack of efficiency in this system and began to consider proposals for an international standard for electric engineering.

In 1904, Crompton represented Britain at the Louisiana Purchase Exposition in Saint Louis as part of a delegation by the Institute of Electrical Engineers. He presented a paper on standardisation, which was so well received that he was asked to look into the formation of a commission to oversee the process. He said he saw "great difficulty" in the project, but began work.

By 1906 his work was complete and he drew up a permanent constitution for the International Electrotechnical Commission (IEC), which held its first meeting that year in London, with representatives from 14 countries.

The IEC's work was interrupted by the Great War. During this conflict, Crompton was asked by the Landships Committee to submit designs for a 'Land Ship' that could cross enemy trenches and barbed wire whilst protecting its occupants from bullets. His design formed the basis of the first practical tanks. The Commission reconvened in 1919 in Geneva. Although Germany was not officially invited to send delegates, an unofficial representation was sent, and Crompton insisted on greeting them, despite unease from other members. He expressed "great satisfaction that our peacemaking efforts were successful".

In 1926 Crompton was awarded the Faraday Medal for his work, and two years later work began on Britain's National Grid.

== Later life ==
Whilst Crompton & Co. was one of Britain's largest electrical equipment manufacturers, the emergence of global conglomerates in the 1920s such as General Electric, Siemens and Metropolitan-Vickers meant that Crompton's was beginning to lose ground. In 1929, in a move that greatly surprised the industry, Crompton & Co. merged with its rival F & A. Parkinson Ltd. to form Crompton-Parkinson.

After conducting the merger, Crompton retired, leaving the company in the hands of Frank Parkinson. He moved from his London home to a house in his native Yorkshire in 1939. The house had no electricity, but his former company installed a generating plant free of charge.

Colonel Crompton died in February 1940, aged 94.

== Other interests ==
As well as his professional and private interests in engineering and electricity, Crompton was a keen cyclist. He bought his first bicycle in the 1890s. Inevitably he modified and adapted the vehicle, changing the wheel diameter and pedal cranks. He claimed to be able to cycle 200 miles (320 km) without getting tired. As one would expect of a devotee of all things mechanical, he was an early motorist and a founder member of the Royal Automobile Club and president of the Institute of Automotive Engineers.

Starting at his time at Harrow, he was an avid squash player. His dedication to standardisation even extended into this field. He conducted a series of experiments to compare the degree of bounce between the various makes of ball on sale.

== Crompton's companies ==
Crompton-Parkinson itself became part of the Hawker Siddeley Group in 1968. That group was broken up in stages during the 1980s, and several unrelated companies, all directly descended from Crompton & Co. through an often-complex series of mergers, break-ups and buy-outs, using the Crompton name:

- Crompton Lighting - One of the oldest lighting manufacturers, this company is still based in Britain, with manufacturing in Doncaster, Yorkshire and head offices in Waltham Abbey, Essex. The company is now part of the American company Cooper Industries. The Crompton name is still widely used on a range of products. A totally separate company using the same name operates in Australia, and is descended from Crompton & Co's Australian subsidiary.
- Brook Crompton - a manufacturer of electric motors with facilities in 5 countries, headquartered in Huddersfield, Yorkshire. It is owned by the Singapore-based Lindeteves-Jacoberg Limited.
- Crompton Controls - based in Wakefield, Yorkshire. The company is in private hands and manufactures switchgear, relays, solenoids and other electrical components.
- Crompton Instruments - Part of Tyco International since 2002, this company manufactures mechanical and electronic electrical meters and related measuring equipment.
- CG Power and Industrial Solutions- the modern descendant of Crompton & Co.'s Indian operations, headquartered in Mumbai. Like its original parent company, this is a wide-ranging manufacturer building switchgear, motors, generators, transformers and meters. The company is engaged in the electrification program for Indian Railways.
- Crompton Greaves Consumer Electricals

== Publications ==
- Crompton, Rookes Evelyn Bell (2018) [1st pub. 1882]. The Electric Light for Industrial Uses. Creative Media Partners, LLC. p. 82. ISBN 9781377817873.

== Bibliography ==
- "Reminiscences" by R.E.B. Crompton.
- IEC Website
- IET Website biography of Crompton
- IET Article on Crompton's work in India
- Johnson, J & Randell, W (1948) Colonel Crompton and the Evolution of the Electrical Industry, Longman Green.
