= Charters House =

Historic building in Berkshire, England

- Interactive map of the Charters House area

General information
- Location: Charters Road, Sunninghill, Berkshire
- Coordinates: 51.396472°N 0.649451°W
- Year built: 1938
- Client: Frank Parkinson

Design and construction
- Architects: George Adie and H. G. Hammond
- Architecture firm: Adie, Button and Partners

Listed Building – Grade II
- Official name: Charters
- Designated: 28 September 1995
- Reference no.: 1323676

Listed Building – Grade II
- Official name: Columned fountain enclosure at Charters on the east side
- Designated: 28 September 1995
- Reference no.: 1323677

Charters House is a Grade II listed building overlooking Sunningdale, Berkshire, built in 1938. The architects were George Adie and H. G. Hammond of Adie, Button and Partners.

Charters was built for the industrialist Frank Parkinson on the site of an earlier house built in the late 1860s by William Terrick Hamilton. Parkinson’s guests included Winston Churchill and the Duke and Duchess of Windsor. In 1949, the house was bought by Sir Montague Burton. It later became a corporate headquarters and has since been redeveloped as an apartment complex and spa.
