= Crompton Greaves Consumer Electricals =

Indian consumer electronics company

Crompton Greaves Consumer Electricals Limited
- Type: Public
- Traded as: BSE: 539876; NSE: CROMPTON
- ISIN: INE299U01018
- Industry: Consumer electronics
- Founded: 1937
- Headquarters: Mumbai, India
- Key people: Promeet Ghosh (CEO & MD); Kaleeswaran Arunachalam (CFO)
- Products: Fans, Water pumps, Lighting, Home appliances, Kitchen appliances
- Revenue: ▲₹7,932 crore (US$820 million) (2025)
- Net income: ▲₹564 crore (US$59 million) (2025)
- Subsidiaries: Butterfly Gandhimathi (75%)
- Website: www.crompton.co.in
- Footnotes; Financials as of 31 March 2025.

Crompton Greaves Consumer Electricals Limited, doing business as Crompton, is an Indian electrical equipment company based in Mumbai. The company has lighting and electrical consumer durables including LED lighting, fans, pumps, and household appliances like water heaters, air coolers, and kitchen appliances.

== History ==
The company was established in 1937 as Crompton Parkinson Works Limited, a wholly owned subsidiary of Crompton Parkinson. In 1947, it was acquired by Karam Chand Thapar. The company was established in 2016 as an outcome of the demerger of Crompton Greaves Limited which separated the latter's consumer goods business from the power and industrial systems segment. The demerger plan was announced in July 2014 and it was completed in 2016 with the creation of CG Power and Industrial Solutions and Crompton Greaves Consumer Electricals Limited. At the time of demerger, Gautam Thapar, the former chairman of combined Crompton Greaves Limited, sold his 34% stake in CGCEL to Advent International and Temasek Holdings for ₹2000 crore.

Crompton's operation is divided into two segments: one is Electrical consumer durables (ECD) which include fans, appliances, and pumps. The other one is Lightings which includes LED and Non-LEDs products. Under the ECD, the company holds 26% market share in fans business.

As of September 2020, the company has manufacturing facilities at Goa, Vadodara, Ahmednagar and Baddi. And one R&D centre at Vikhroli, in the suburb of Mumbai.

In February 2022, Crompton acquired a 55% controlling stake in home appliances firm Butterfly Gandhimathi for ₹1,380 crore (US$180 million) and an additional 26% through an open offer for ₹666 crore (US$80 million). In March 2023, Crompton announced a stock swap merger with Butterfly Gandhimathi, but the proposed merger failed after public shareholders voted against it in October 2023.

In August 2026, Crompton announced a projected three-year revenue target of ₹250- 300 crore for its super- premium brand, Rhion, following its market launch.

== Controversies ==
In November 2017, Reuters reported instances of "prescient messages" regarding the performance of 12 Indian companies in WhatsApp groups and it included Crompton. The information contained upcoming quarterly results, including specific metrics such as net profits, revenues, and operating margins. At that time, the matter was investigated by India's Securities and Exchange Board of India for insider trading by brokers. Later, in 2021, the Securities Appellate Tribunal (SAT) set aside the SEBI's order because the latter was failed to prove insider trading connection among and between the brokers.
