= Oriental Bank of Commerce =

Public sector bank in India (now defunct)

- Company type: Public
- Traded as: BSE: 500315; NSE: ORIENTBANK
- Industry: Banking; Financial services
- Founded: 19 February 1943; 83 years ago in Lahore, British India
- Founder: Rai Bahadur Sohan Lal
- Defunct: 1 April 2020
- Fate: Merged with Punjab National Bank
- Successor: Punjab National Bank
- Headquarters: Gurgaon, India
- Area served: India
- Key people: Mukesh Kumar Jain (MD & CEO)
- Products: Asset management; Commercial banking; Consumer banking; Credit cards; Investment banking; Mortgages; Pensions; Private banking; Retail banking
- Revenue: ▲₹17,867.69 crore (US$1.9 billion) (2019)
- Operating income: ▲₹3,754 crore (US$390 million) (2019)
- Net income: ▲₹55.00 crore (US$5.7 million) (2019)
- Total assets: ▲₹271,909.57 crore (US$28 billion) (2019)
- Number of employees: 21,729 (March 2019)
- Capital ratio: 12.73% (2019)

Oriental Bank of Commerce (OBC) was an Indian public sector bank headquartered at Gurgaon, Haryana. It had 2390 branches and 2625 ATMs across India. In April 2020, the bank along with United Bank of India was merged with Punjab National Bank, making the latter the second-largest public sector bank in India.

== History ==
Its earliest date of incorporation, per the Registrar of Companies is 1901. Rai Bahadur Lala Sohan Lal, the first Chairman of the Bank, founded OBC in 1943 in Lahore. Within four years of its coming into existence, OBC had to face Partition. The bank had to close down its branches in the newly formed Pakistan and shift its registered office from Lahore to Amritsar. Lala Karam Chand Thapar, the then Chairman of the Bank, in a unique gesture honoured the commitments made to the depositors from Pakistan and paid every rupee to its departing customers.

The Bank has witnessed many ups and downs since its establishment. The period of 1970–76 is said to be the most challenging phase in the history of the Bank. At one time, profit plummeted to ₹ 175; that prompted the owner of the bank, the Thapar Group, to sell / close the bank. Then employees and leaders of the Bank came forward to rescue the Bank. The owners were moved and had to change their decision to selling the bank and in turn, they decided to improve the position of the bank with the active cooperation and support of all the employees. Their efforts bore fruits and performance of the bank improved significantly. This was the turning point in the history of the bank.

The bank was nationalised on April 15 April 1980. At that time, OBC ranked 19th among the 20 nationalised banks.

In 1997, OBC acquired Bari Doab Bank and Punjab Cooperative Bank. (Note: Bari Doab Bank had been established in Lahore on 12 May 1915; in 1947 the bank transferred its head-office to Hoshiarpur, where it had been the first joint stock bank to operate in the district. Punjab Cooperative Bank had been established in Amritsar on 31 October 1904. It had been liquidated in September 1914, but apparently had been re-established. During partition, it had lost operations in Pakistan.) The acquisition of these two banks brought with it no additional branches.

The bank has previously issued and subscribed to 12,80,000 shares, each valued at Rs 10 in 1993. Subsequently, it has allotted shares to Indian financial institutions and mutual funds at a premium . Additionally, 480,00,000 shares have been allotted to the Indian public at the same premium rate. Furthermore, 23,80,000 shares have been allocated to employees. In 1993, OBC became the first nationalized bank to tap the capital market for raising funds.

The bank has progressed on several fronts, crossing the business mix mark of₹ 2,37,000 crore as of March 31, 2010, making it the seventh-largest public sector Bank in India.

On August 14, 2004, OBC amalgamated with Global Trust Bank (GTB). GTB was a leading private sector bank in India that was associated with various financial discrepancies, leading to a moratorium being imposed by the RBI shortly before it merged with OBC. The acquisition brought with it 103 branches, which increased OBC's branch total to 1092. As per the March 2018–2019 annual report, it has 2390 branches and 2625 ATM's pan India.

=== Amalgamation ===
On 30 August 2019, Finance Minister Nirmala Sitharaman announced that the Oriental Bank of Commerce and United Bank of India (UBI) would be merged with Punjab National Bank (PNB). The proposed merger would make PNB the second largest public sector bank in the country with assets of ₹17.95 lakh crore (US$190 billion) and 11,437 branches. MD and CEO of UBI, Ashok Kumar Pradhan, stated that the merged entity would begin functioning from 1 April 2020. The Union Cabinet approved the merger on 4 March 2020. PNB announced that its board had approved the merger ratios the next day. Shareholders of OBC and UBI would receive 1,150 shares and 121 shares of PNB, respectively, for every 1,000 shares they hold. The merge came into effect since 1 April 2020. Post merger, PNB has become the second largest public sector bank in India.

== Chairmen ==
The Chairmen (CMD) of the bank were as under:

| Name | Period |
|---|---|
| Karam Chand Thapar | 1946 to 1967 |
| L. M. Thapar | 1961 to 1969 |
| R. P. Oberoi | 1973 to 1976 |
| M. K. Vig | 1976 to 1983 |
| P. S. Gopalakrishnan | 1984 to 1988 |
| S. P. Talwar | 1988 to 1990 |
| S. K. Soni | 1990 to 1996 |
| Dalbir Singh | 1996 to 2000 |
| B. D. Narang | 2000 to 2005 |
| K. N. Prithviraj | 2005 to 2007 |
| T. Y. Prabhu | August 2009 to January 2011 |
| Nagesh Pydah | January 2011 to February 2012 |
| S.L. Bansal | March 2012 to September 2014 |
| Sh. Animesh Chauhan | December 2014 to June 2017 |
| Sh. Mukesh Kumar Jain | July 2017 to March 2020 |

== Overview ==
The bank offers a wide range of banking products and services such as deposit accounts, loans, debit cards, credit cards (with tie-up with SBI), Insurance products, ATMs, Internet banking, Mobile Banking, Self-banking halls, call centre, etc.

The Bank has launched yet another people's participation in the planning process at grass root level essentially to tackle the maladies of poverty. The Grameen Projects venture aims to alleviate poverty plus identify the reasons responsible for the failure or success.

OBC is already implementing a Grameen Project in Dehradun District (UK) and Hanumangarh District (Rajasthan). Formulated on the pattern of the Bangladesh Grameen Bank, the Scheme has a unique feature of disbursing small loans ranging from ₹ 75 (~US$1.50) onwards. The beneficiaries of the Grameen Project are mostly women. The Bank is engaged in providing training to rural folk in using locally available raw material to produce pickles, jams etc. This has provided self-employment and augmented income levels thus reforming lives of rural folk and encouraging cottage industries in rural areas.

OBC launched yet another unique scheme christened 'The Comprehensive Village Development Programme' on the auspicious day of Baisakhi, 13 April 1997, at three villages in Punjab, namely Rurki Kalan (District. Sangrur), Raje Majra (District. Ropar) and Khaira Majha (District. Jaladhar) and two villages in Haryana, namely Khunga (District. Jind) and Narwal (District. Kaithal). The pilot launch was a great success. Emboldened by the success, Bank extended the programme to more villages. At present, it covers 15 villages: 10 in Punjab, 4 in Haryana and 1 in Rajasthan. The programme focuses on providing a comprehensive and integrated package providing rural finance to the villagers, with Village Development as its focus, thus contributing towards infrastructural development and augmentation of income for each farmer of the village. The Bank has implemented a 14-point action plan for strengthening of credit delivery to women and has designated 5 branches as specialised branches for women entrepreneurs.
