= H. G. Hammond =

British architect

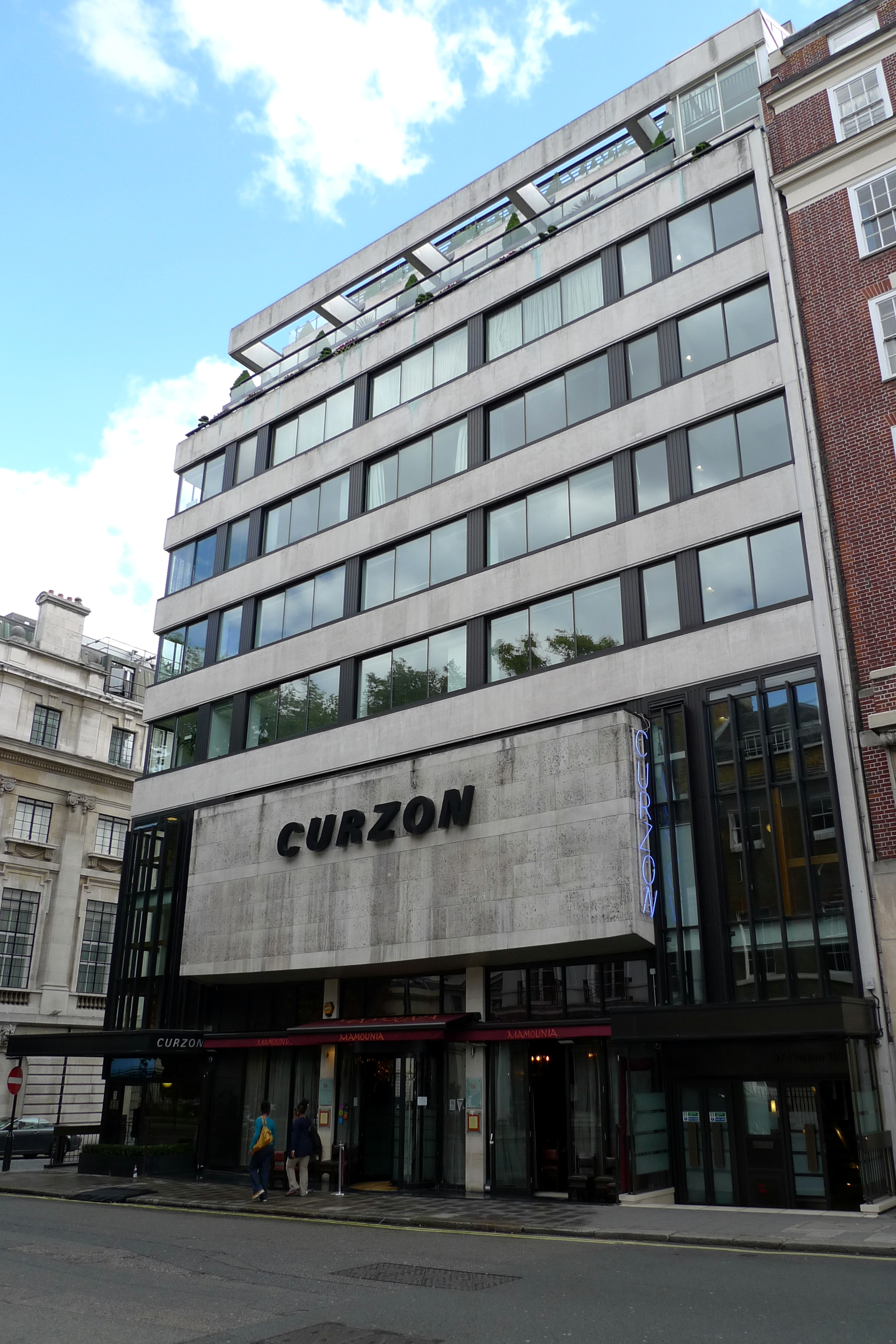
Curzon Mayfair, Cinema, 2009

Horace Gael Hammond (4 June 1910 – December 2006) was a British architect, responsible for designing the Grade II listed Curzon Mayfair Cinema for Sir John Burnet, Tait and Partners, built in 1963–1966. Historic England have described it as "the finest surviving cinema building of the post-war period, it is also the least altered."

Hammond was the junior partner to George Adie in designing Charters House, Berkshire, built in 1938.
