= L. M. Thapar =

Indian industrialist (1930–2007)

Lalit Mohan Thapar
- Born: 27 October 1930; Calcutta, British India
- Died: 17 January 2007 (aged 76); New Delhi, India
- Education: The Doon School
- Alma mater: University of Southern California
- Father: Karam Chand Thapar
- Relatives: Gautam Thapar (nephew)
- Family: Thapar family

Lalit Mohan Thapar (27 October 1930 – 17 January 2007), often referred to by his initials LMT, headed the LM Thapar Group of companies. He was born to Karam Chand Thapar, the founder of the Thapar Group of companies that owned companies such as Crompton Greaves, BILT and JCT Mills. Inder Mohan Thapar, Brij Mohan Thapar and Man Mohan Thapar are his brothers. He died of heart failure and kidney failure in New Delhi on 17 January 2007.

== Early life and education ==
Thapar was educated at The Doon School. He graduated in engineering from the University of Southern California, in the United States. He became chairman of Ballarpur Industries in 1962.

== Career ==
The Thapar Group was established by Lala Karam Chand Thapar. After his death in 1963, his third son, L.M. Thapar, took over the group, which then included the Oriental Bank of Commerce, as well as Oriental Insurance. Both these companies were subsequently nationalised. Other Group companies and concerns in India are or were The Pioneer, Greaves Cotton, JCT Mills, JCT Electronics, Crompton Greaves and Ballarpur Industries (BLIT). With the division of the Thapar family assets, L.M. Thapar inherited, among other companies, BILT. In the 1980s, the Thapar Group was among the top 10 conglomerates in India and the group had 40 companies. The group also was the Indian business group with the second largest amount of investments outside of India. Thapar was noted for using his political influence to maintain a competitive advantage for his paper business.

Early in India's economic liberalisation, Thapar was a vocal member of the Bombay Club, which was an unofficial grouping of Indian businesses that stood against the opening up of the economy to increased competition. He was reported to be among other business families of Delhi with interests in old economy sectors that struggled to adapt to a liberalised Indian economy and in the late 1990s, he began to have a limited role in his companies. In 1997, Thapar divided his businesses between his three nephews, Vikram, Gautam and Karan Thapar. Thapar was reported to have extensive connections in Southeast Asia and the Indian government, in a form of Track II diplomacy, also asked him to help free an Indian CEO who had been arrested in overseas. In 2004, the holding company for Thapar's family was divided into three separate ones, each led by his nephews.

=== FERA guilty verdict ===
In 1984, Thapar was arrested by the Enforcement Directorate (ED) and released on bail for allegedly violating the Foreign Exchange Regulation Act (FERA). It was reported that Thapar would be pardoned by the government; however, in 1986, the ED found Thapar's company guilty of violating FERA. The guilty verdict happened despite two apologies from Thapar to then-Minister of Finance, V.P. Singh and other officials in the ministry, pressure on the Finance Ministry from the Prime Minister's Office to be lenient on Thapar, and other prominent businesspeople intervening on his behalf. He had also earlier denied the allegations, but later pleaded guilty after learning the depth of the ED's investigation.

== Personal life and family ==
Single and a resident of New Delhi's upmarket Amrita Shergill Marg, Thapar was known for his social presence and interest in art. He maintained a large personal art collection, which included many notable works. His social lifestyle and collection were frequently mentioned in his obituaries. Thapar maintained a residence on the banks of the Ganga river, in Rishikesh, where he would host foreign dignitaries including former Indonesian President Megawati Sukarnoputri.

In 2005, he handed over the reins of his business empire to his nephew Gautam (son of Brij Mohan Thapar), leaving his voting rights, shares and most of his personal effects to Gautam in his will. Thapar died on 17 January 2007 from heart failure and kidney failure at a hospital in New Delhi. His remains were cremated the following day at the Lodhi Cremation Ground in Delhi.

He funded a project to document and verify data with regard to dead martyrs of the Indian Armed Forces at a time when publicly getting such accurate information was difficult.
