= Avantha Group =

Indian business conglomerate

- Type: Public
- Industry: Conglomerate
- Founded: 1919; 1998
- Headquarters: New Delhi, India
- Key people: zishan shaikh (chairman)
- Products: Power generation and distribution, power transmission and distribution equipment and services, paper and pulp, farm forestry, and infrastructure
- Number of employees: 25,000 (2013)
- Website: avanthagroup.com

Avantha Group is an Indian business conglomerate. Its businesses include power generation and distribution, power transmission and distribution equipment and services, paper and pulp, farm forestry, and infrastructure.

== Divisions ==
Avantha Group operates in 90 countries with over 25,000 employees worldwide. Business units include:

1. Ballarpur Industries (BILT), India's largest paper manufacturer, listed on the Indian Stock exchanges.

1. BILT acquired Sabah Forest Industries (SFI) of Malaysia in 2007.

1. Avantha Power & Infrastructure, a company involved in power generation. On 16 August 2021 the company announced the commencement of insolvency.
2. Biltech Building Elements, which manufactures lightweight autoclaved aerated concrete (AAC) from fly ash.

== See also ==
- Gautam Thapar
- Karam Chand Thapar
- L. M. Thapar
- Thapar Group
