= Naina Lal Kidwai =

Indian banker (born 1957)

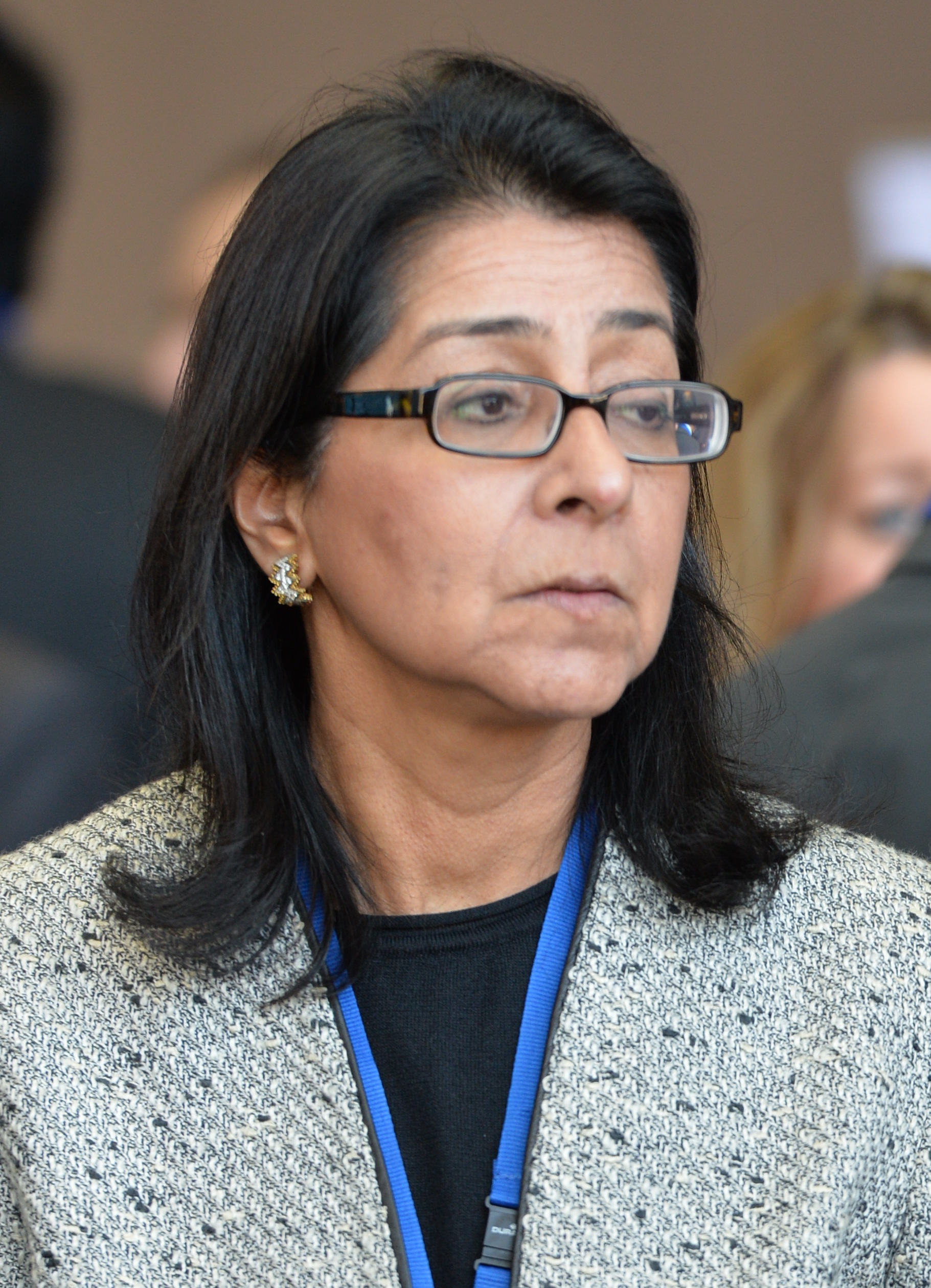
- Kidwai in 2014
- Born: April 14, 1957 (age 69); Delhi, India
- Education: University of Delhi (BA); Harvard Business School (MBA)
- Occupation: Banker
- Years active: 1982 – present
- Title: Ex-CEO and Country Head of HSBC India
- Spouse: Rashid K. Kidwai
- Family: Thapar family

Naina Lal Kidwai (born 14 April 1957) is an Indian banker and business executive. She was a Group General Manager and the Country Head of HSBC India. She is also a former President of the Federation of Indian Chambers of Commerce and Industry (FICCI). She was the first woman appointed on this post.

In 2007, Kidwai received the Padma Shri, India's fourth-highest civilian award. She holds a bachelor's degree in economics from the University of Delhi and an MBA from Harvard Business School, becoming the first Indian woman to graduate from the latter.

== Early life and background ==
Naina Lall Kidwai was born into a Punjabi family on 14 April 1957. Kidwai's father, Surinder Lall, was the CEO of an insurance company. Kidwai's mother was the daughter of Karamchand Thapar, founder of the Thapar Group of companies. Kidwai has one sister, Nonita Lall Qureshi, a golfer and an Arjuna Award winner in 1989, who is married to Pakistani golf champion Faisal Qureshi.

== Education ==
Kidwai holds a bachelor's degree in economics from Lady Shri Ram College for Women, a woman's college in University of Delhi, and belongs to the batch of 1977. Funded by her mother's wealthy family, the Thapar family, she then went to Harvard Business School (HBS) to do a Master of Business Administration (MBA), and graduated in 1982. Kidwai is also the first Indian woman to graduate from HBS.

== Career ==
Kidwai's first job was with Price Waterhouse, which later became PricewaterhouseCoopers (PwC). She entered the banking industry when she joined ANZ Grindlays, where she worked from 1982 to 1994. From 1994 to 2002, Kidwai worked in Morgan Stanley India, where, in 1997, she was also made the head of investment banking.

In 2002, she joined HSBC Securities and Capital Markets and her during time at the company, Kidwai became HSBC Securities and Capital Market's vice-chairman, managing director, and head of investment banking in India, and retired in 2015. She also oversaw other HSBC India businesses, including insurance, asset management, securities and capital markets, software development and global service centres.

She has also been the Chairman of Max Financial Services. Her other positions include being a non-executive director on the board of Nestle SA and Altico Capital Partners, chairwoman, City of London's Advisory Council for India, Global Advisor, Harvard Business School. She is on the Governing Board of NCAER, Audit Advisory Board of the Comptroller and Auditor General of India, and on the National Executive Committee of CII and FICCI. She is an independent director of Nayara Energy (Formerly Essar Oil Limited) and Biocon.

Kidwai served as the President of Federation of Indian Chambers of Commerce & Industry (FICCI). Elected in 2012, she was the first woman to be elected as the FICCI president. Kidwai has also been a Senior Adviser to Rothschild & Co in India. She is a National Advisory Board Member to AIESEC India. She is also on the Board of Advisors of India's International Movement to Unite Nations (I.I.M.U.N.). In 2025, Kidwai was appointed as an advisor at Lightspeed Venture Partners, a venture capital firm.

== Recognition ==
Kidwai received the Padma Shri in 2007 for her contributions in the areas of trade and industry. She also received the All Ladies League's Delhi Women of the Decade Achievers Award 2013 for Excellence in Banking. Kidwai has repeatedly ranked in the Fortune global list of Top Women in Business. She was 12th in the Wall Street Journal 2006 Global Listing of Women to Watch and was listed by Time Magazine as one of their 15 Global Influentials 2002.

== Personal life ==
Kidwai is the second wife of Rashid Kidwai, who runs an NGO named Grassroot Trading Network for Women. They have one daughter together, Kemaya Kidwai. Rashid Kidwai also has a son from his previous marriage. Kidwai reveals in an interview that she listens to "all music except heavy metal" and claims to be a nature lover who loves to go on trekking tours to the Himalayas.
