= Thapar family =

Family of Indian businesspeople

Thapar family is an Indian business family. They are not a single business group, and every branch of the family runs its own clutch of companies. The family is of Punjabi origin. The family's fortunes as a business house was founded by Karam Chand Thapar.

== Prominent members ==
- Karam Chand Thapar
  - Inder Mohan Thapar
    - Vikram Thapar
      - Ayesha Thapar, married to Nikesh Arora, chief executive officer (CEO) and chairman of Palo Alto Networks
      - Nitasha Thapar, married to Mukul Deora, son of Murli Deora
      - Varun Thapar
  - Brij Mohan Thapar
    - Karan Thapar
    - Gautam Thapar
  - Lalit Mohan Thapar, never married
  - Man Mohan Thapar
    - Sameer Thapar
      - Priya Thapar
      - Sonia Thapar
      - Arjun Thapar
  - Mrs. Surinder Lal
    - Naina Lal Kidwai, wife of Rashid K Kidwai
    - Nonita Lal Qureshi, wife of Pakistani golf champion Faisal Qureshi

== See also ==
- Thapar Group
- Thapar University
