= Ed Edwards =

British corporate executive and film director

- Occupations: Advertising executive; filmmaker

Ed Edwards is an advertising executive and filmmaker.

== Career ==
Ed Edwards has created commercials for companies including Audi, the BBC, Lexus, and Lynx. In 2003, he won the D&AD Yellow Pencil for the BBC "Love of Life" campaign.

He directed the Yoomoo "Ice Skater" commercial produced by Donnie Masters of Serious Pictures, Viasat Film Channel "Love Christmas" (which was nominated for a Promax Award in 2013), MTV Rocks "Car Guitar", and the cinema ad "Pamina" for the charity Against Breast Cancer.

Edwards is the co-founder of Ragged Crow, an independent film production company with producer and writer Sam Edwards. He has directed several short films, including Solstice (2008) (which he co-wrote), Bad Obsession (2009), Doggoy (2009) (which he wrote), and Insomnia (2010) (which he co-wrote).

His short film War Dance (2011) was nominated in the newcomer category at the Rushes Soho Shorts Festival 2011 and screened at the Portobello Film Festival 2011, Branchage International Film Festival 2011, Aesthetica Short Film Festival 2011, where it was also nominated, and the London Short Film Festival 2012 and subsequently qualified for BAFTA.

Edwards' first feature film as a director was Stealing Elvis (2010) ^{[6]} which debuted at the Portobello Film Festival, where it was nominated for Best Soundtrack, was the opening film at the London Independent Film Festival 2011, was nominated for the Grand Jury Prize at the London United Film Festival 2012 (The United Film Festivals) and won an award in the Best Crime Drama category at the Indie Gathering International Film Festival 2012.

The Promoter was Edwards' second feature film, which debuted at the London Independent Film Festival in 2013, going on to win both the Grand Jury and the Audience Award at the London United Film Festival 2013 as well as being nominated Best Documentary at the Indie Gathering 2013, and Best Rock & Roll Film at the Portobello Film Festival 2013.

Edwards' debut photography exhibition was at The Society Club, Soho, London W1 in October 2011. Entitled Iron Horse, it displayed a series of 19 limited edition (x10) photographs depicting images of rockers, bikers, and their motorcycles. He has had a series of photographs printed in Plectrum-TCP May, 2012, Issue 12, and in Vive Le Rock magazine, Vive Le Valentine, Issue 2012.
