= Promoter =

Promoter or Promotor may refer to:

== Arts and entertainment ==
- The Card (1952 film), released in America as The Promoter
- The Promoter (2012 film), a documentary film

== Professions ==
- Promoter (entertainment), marketing and promoting events
- Corporate promoter, doing work related to the formation of a company
- Tour promoter, organizing a live concert tour or special event performance

== Science ==
- Promoter (catalysis), an accelerator of a catalyst
- Promoter (genetics), a sequence of DNA

== Other uses ==
- Promoter (role variant), in the Keirsey Temperament Sorter
- Promotor (typeface), supplied by Joh. Enschedé

== See also ==
- Promotion (disambiguation)
- Protomer
- Devil's advocate, or Promoter of the Faith, in the Catholic Church
