= Adie, Button and Partners =

British architecture firm

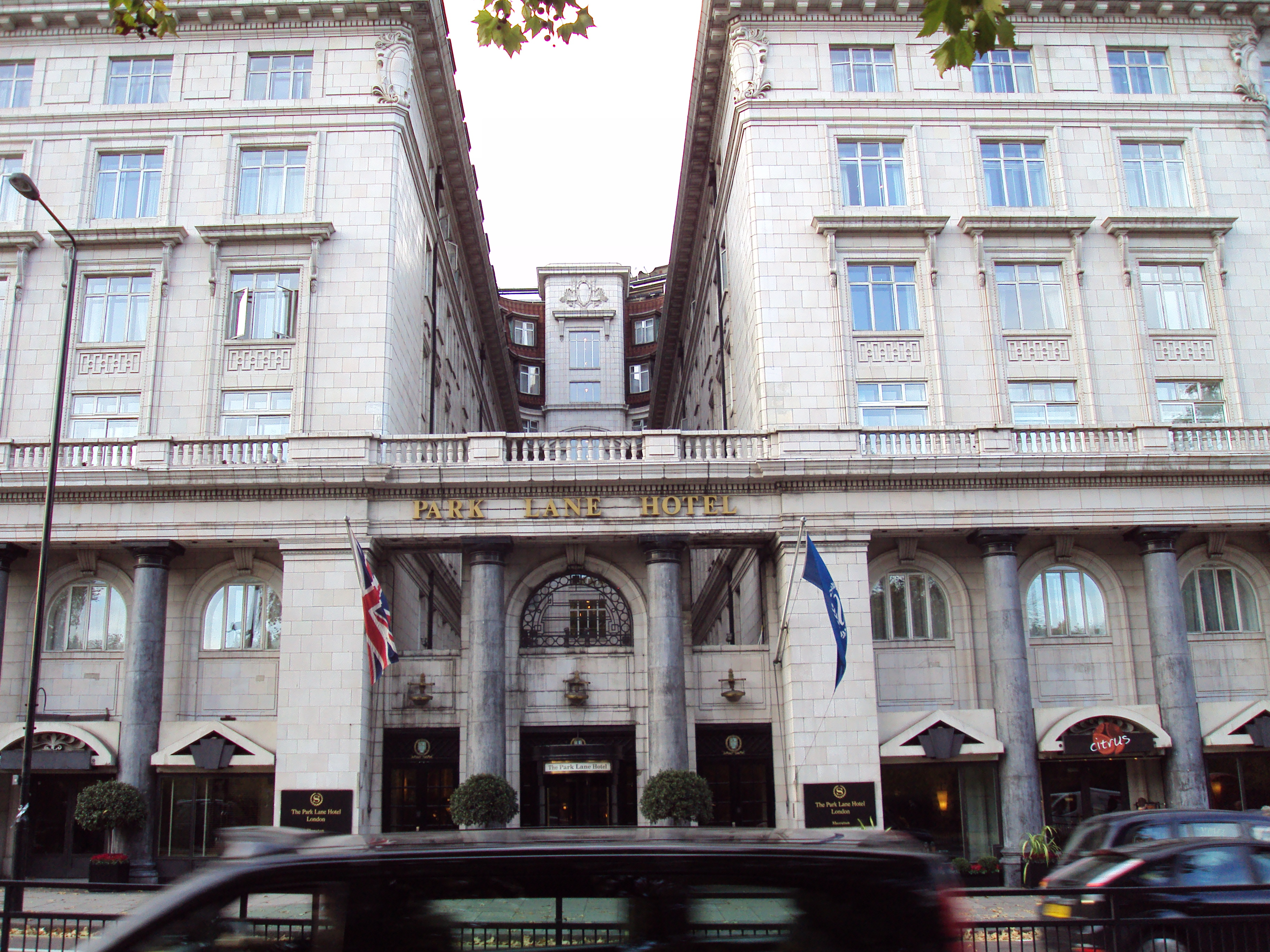
the Park Lane Hotel

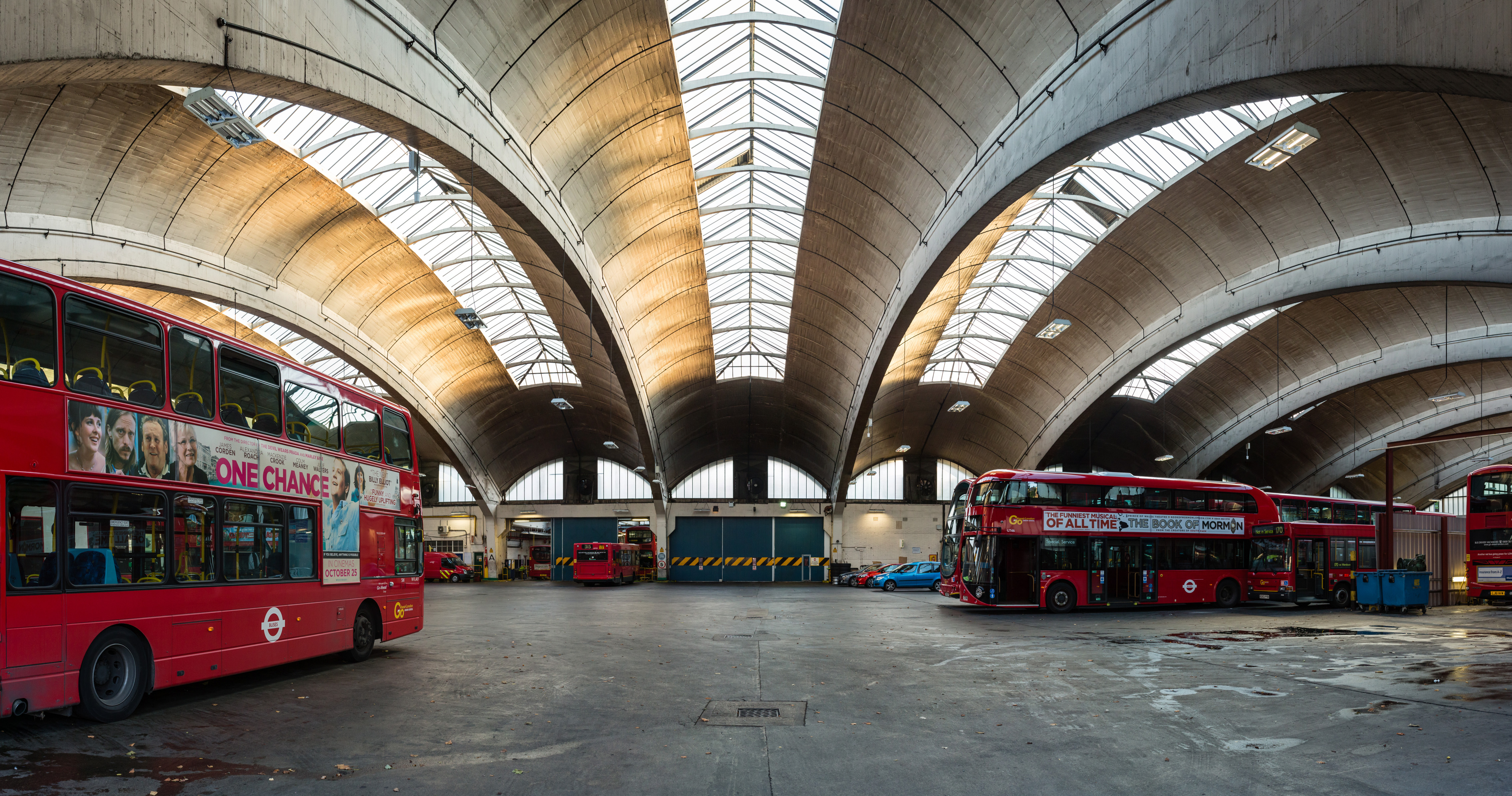
Stockwell Garage interior

Adie, Button and Partners was a British firm of architects, best known for designing the Grade II* listed Stockwell Garage, a large bus depot in Stockwell, London, which opened in 1952 and is still in use.

It was founded by George Adie and Frederick Button.

In 1927, the Park Lane Hotel on Piccadilly, London, was built to their designs.

Charters, a Grade II listed art deco mansion in Sunningdale, Berkshire, built in 1938 for the industrialist Frank Parkinson was designed by Adie, Button. It was built on the site of an earlier house built in the late 1860s by William Terrick Hamilton. Parkinson's guests included Winston Churchill and the Duke and Duchess of Windsor. In 1949, the house was bought by Sir Montague Burton. It later became a corporate headquarters and has since been redeveloped as an apartment complex and spa.

They also designed the striking art deco apartment block at 59–63 Princes Gate, London SW7.
