= Crompton Parkinson =

Former British electrical manufacturing company

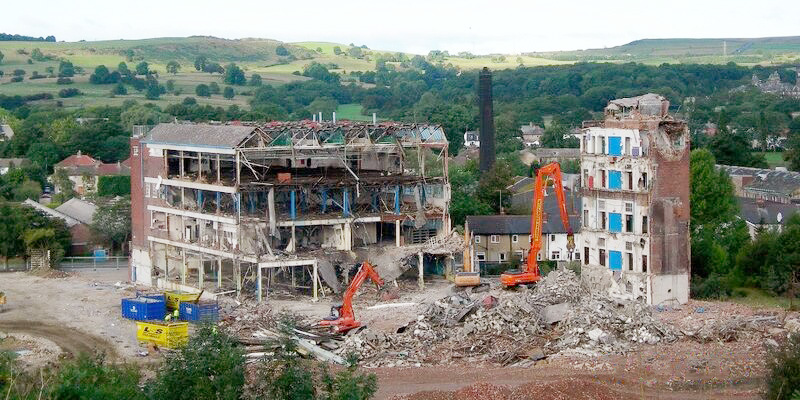
- The Crompton Parkinson Guiseley factory during demolition in 2006
- Industry: Electricity
- Founded: 1878
- Headquarters: Leeds, United Kingdom
- Key people: Albert Parkinson and Frank Parkinson
- Products: Electric motors, Ceiling fans, Electric generators, Light bulbs, Power cables and Batteries

Crompton Parkinson was a British electrical manufacturing company. It was formed in 1927 by the merger of Crompton & Co. with F. & A. Parkinson Ltd. The brand is now part of Brook Crompton.

== History ==
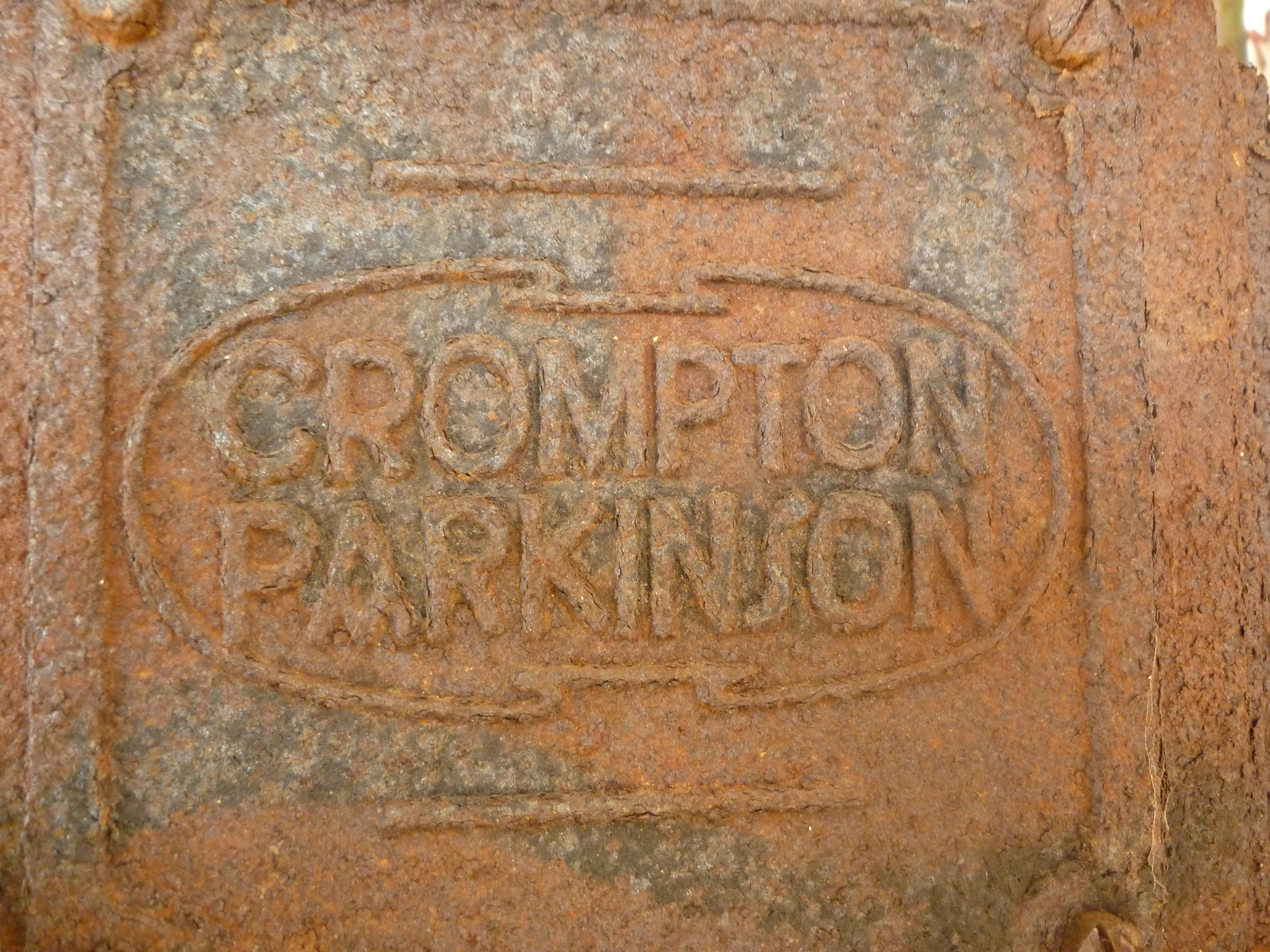
Crompton Parkinson nameplate on a crane

Crompton & Co. was a lamp manufacturer founded by R. E. B. Crompton in 1878. The company was widely known for installing the first electric lighting in Windsor Castle, Holyrood Palace and other prominent buildings.

F. & A. Parkinson Ltd. was a successful electric motor manufacturing company founded by two brothers, Albert and Frank Parkinson, who was a former student of (and later a major benefactor of) Leeds University. The university's Parkinson Building, opened in 1951, is named in his honour.

Crompton Parkinson was taken over by the Hawker Siddeley aerospace group in 1968 which became part of BTR in 1992. BTR merged with Siebe to form Invensys in 1999. After selling off several divisions, Invensys was acquired by Schneider Electric of France in 2014. Crompton Lighting Australia is now owned by Gerard Lighting, whilst Brook Crompton is now owned by Wolong Holding Group Co Ltd of China. Crompton Lamps was sold to Cooper Industries but is now independent.

=== Vidor Batteries and related acquisitions ===
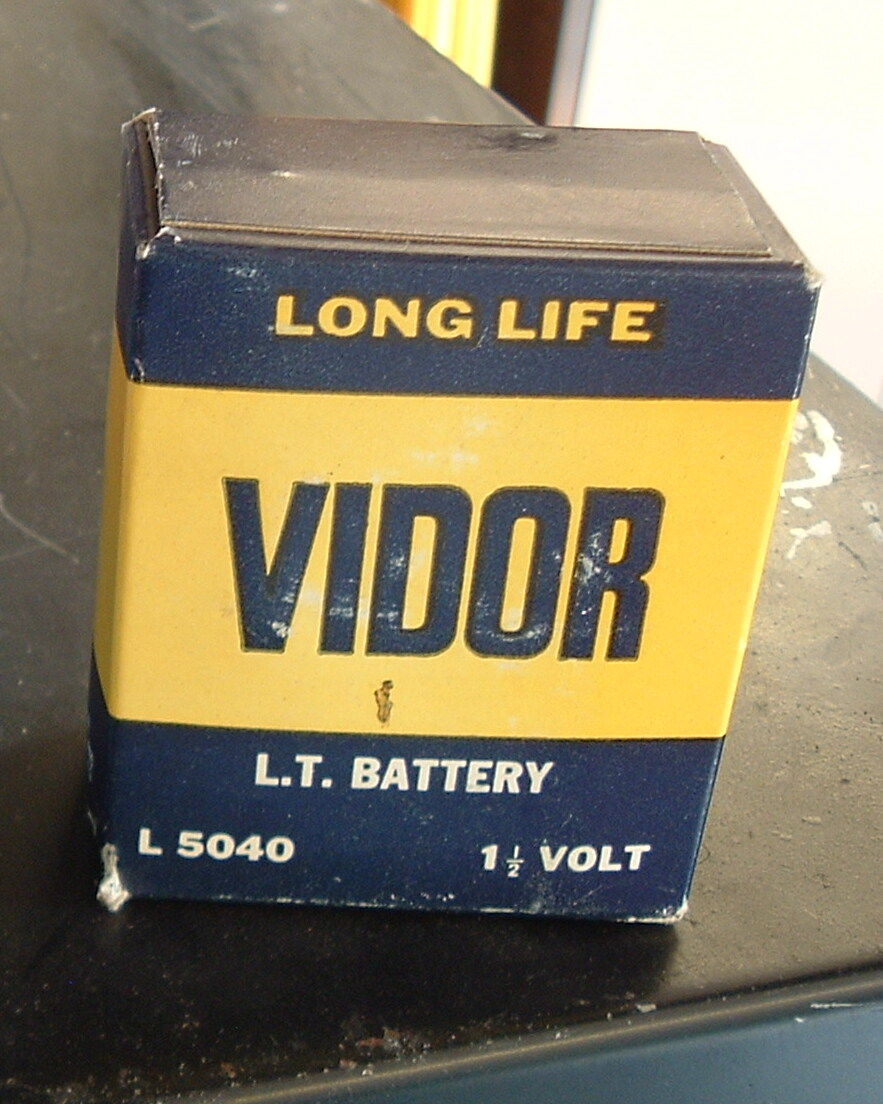
A Vidor radio battery from the 1960s

In 1968, Crompton Parkinson acquired Vidor Batteries, a manufacturer of radio and flashlight batteries. Founded in 1934 by businessman Thomas Noah Cole, the company was located in a former Vickers-Armstrong munitions factory in Erith, Kent. He had also purchased Burndept Wireless, a well-established radio manufacturer. The combined company was called Vidor-Burndept. Cole had made his fortune from his previous company Lissen Ltd., a manufacturer of radio kits, accessories and batteries, which he sold to Ever Ready in 1928.

In April 1941, the Erith factory was almost completely destroyed by a German incendiary raid, forcing the company to relocate production to a former jute mill in Dundee, Scotland. Other factories were also opened, at South Shields and Brechin. A Vidor slogan from the 1950s was "They do say a Vidor battery lasts a month longer!". In the early 1960s Cole sold Vidor-Burndept to Royston Industries, a sheet-metal manufacturer.

Following the collapse of Royston Industries in 1968, the Vidor brand was acquired by Crompton Parkinson. The Vidor brand was sold to Ray-O-Vac in 1989 and is no longer in use.

== Products ==
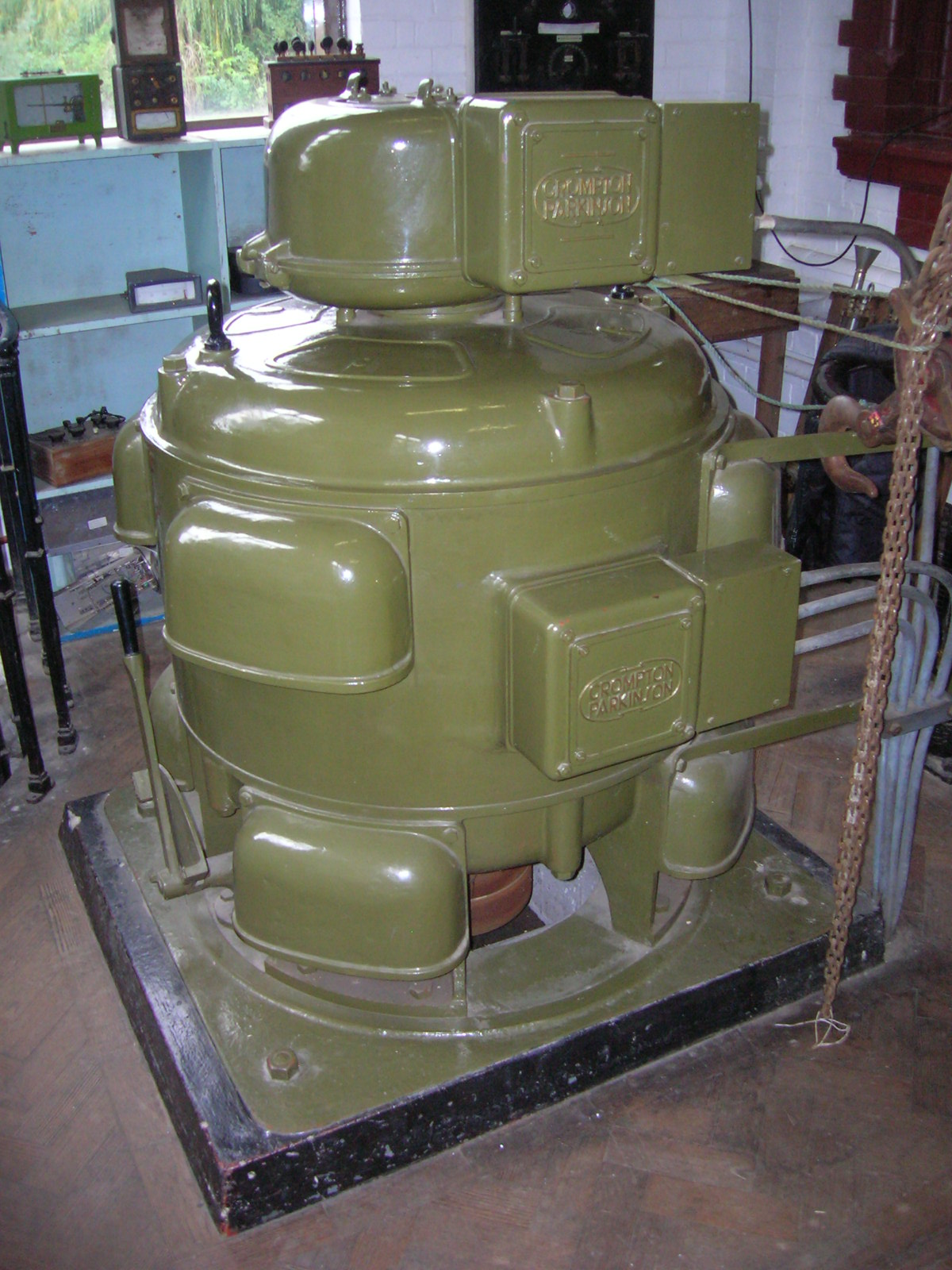
1937 Crompton Parkinson electric pump motor at the Cambridge Museum of Technology

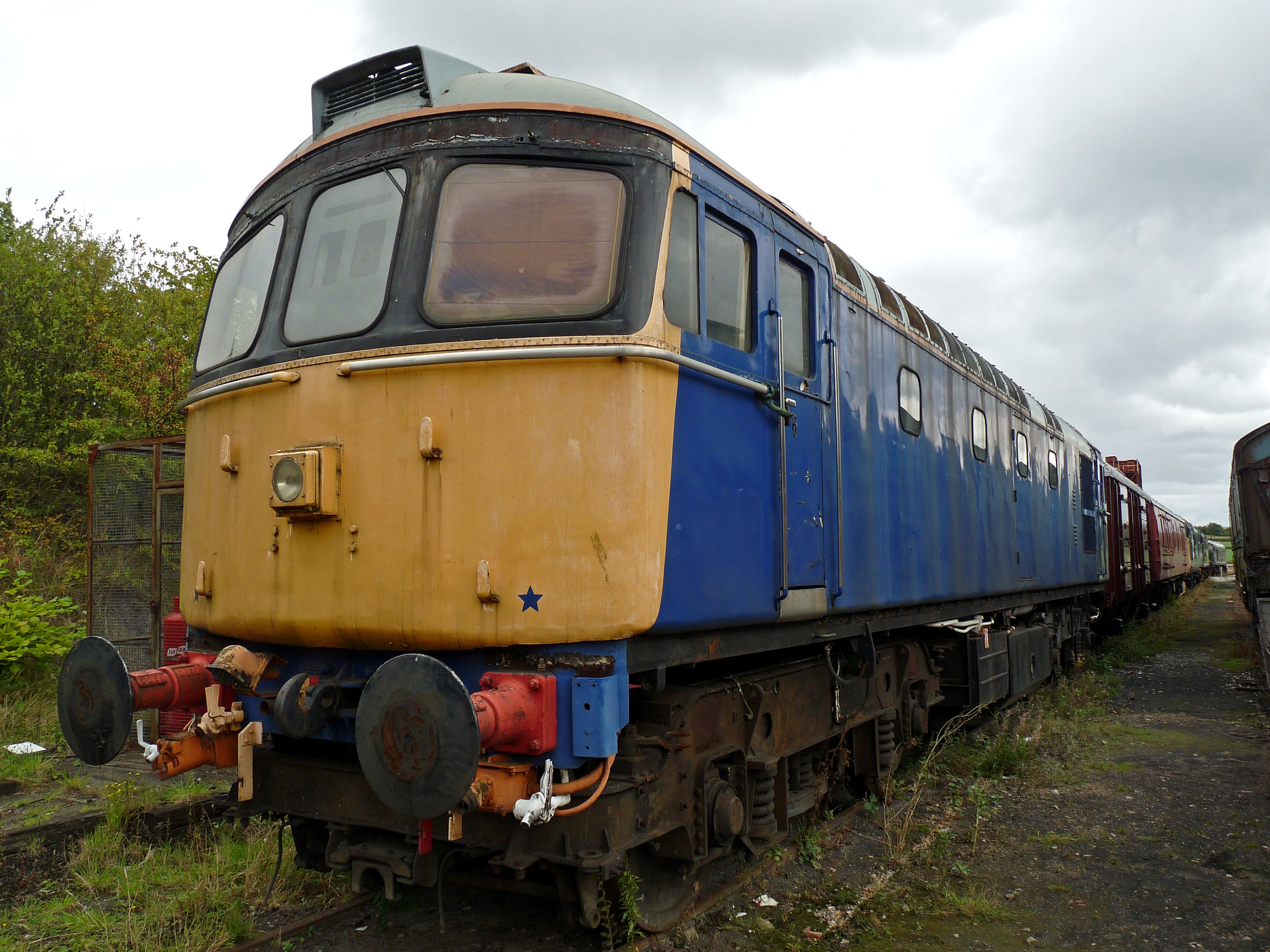
British Rail Class 33

Crompton Parkinson made a wide range of electrical goods including electric motors, ceiling fans, electric generators, light bulbs, power cables and batteries. Some British Railways diesel locomotives (e.g. British Rail Classes 26, 33, 44 and 45) were outfitted with their electrical equipment. The company also produced an extensive range of electrical measuring instruments including voltmeters, ammeters and current transformers and, for a brief time at the beginning, made spark plugs.

=== Wartime production ===
During the Second World War, Crompton Parkinson produced large quantities of .303 rifle ammunition at its Guiseley and Doncaster factories and also 9mm pistol cartridges.

== Factories ==
=== Chelmsford ===
There was a factory located at Writtle Road in Chelmsford, which was originally part of Crompton & Co. The site was taken over by Marconi Radar Systems Ltd in the late 1960s. They remained the occupiers for over 20 years until it was sold for housing development. Only the 'head office' building fronting Writtle Road remains – the old Crompton name is still visible over the door.

=== Guiseley ===
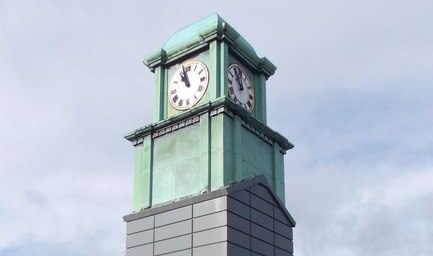
Crompton Parkinson Factory Clock, seen after relocation to a nearby car park in Netherfield Road after the Guiseley factory was demolished in 2006.

During the 1930s, the company built a large factory at Guiseley near Leeds where most of its lamp and electric motor manufacturing was based. The lamp works closed in 2002, and the adjacent electric motor works closed in 2004. The entire site was demolished in 2006, with the clock tower preserved and relocated to a new car park adjacent to the site.

== See also ==
- CG Power and Industrial Solutions
- Crompton Greaves Consumer Electricals
