= Curzon Mayfair Cinema =

Cinema in Mayfair, London, England

Coordinates: 51.506534°N 0.148049°W

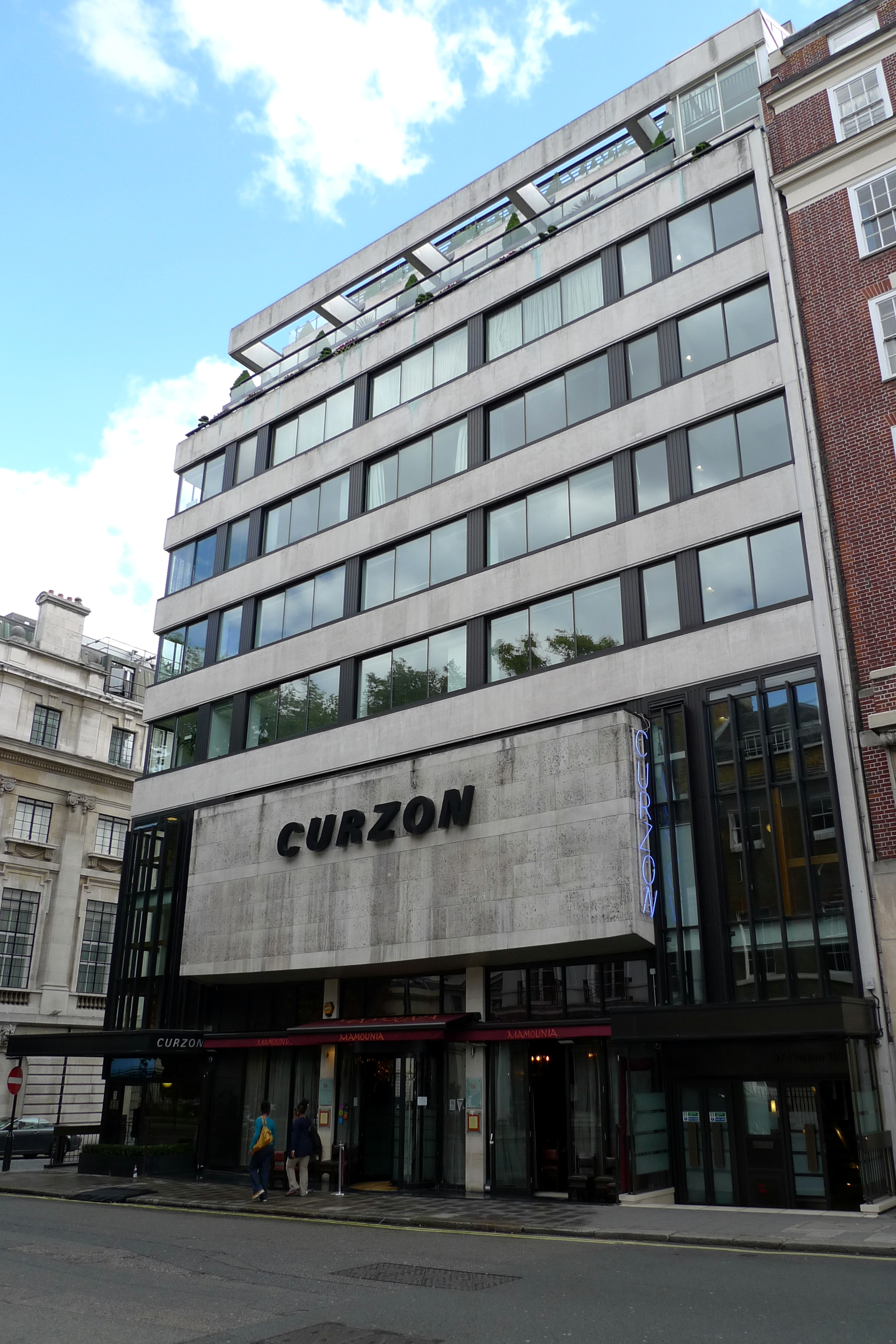
Curzon Mayfair, Cinema, 2009

The Curzon Mayfair Cinema is a Grade II listed building at 37–38 Curzon Street, London W1, built in 1963–66 by H. G. Hammond for Sir John Burnet, Tait and Partners, architects.

Historic England have described it as "the finest surviving cinema building of the post-war period, it is also the least altered." It is part of the Curzon Cinemas chain.

== Closure threat ==
The cinema faced closure in 2016 due to legal action from the property developer, 38 Curzon Limited, over an issue stating that noise from the cinema could be heard on the two floors above. Rob Kenny, a Curzon director, said at the time that they could "never obtain approval for [soundproofing] as the auditorium and surrounding walls are listed".

The issue was resolved after a petition, as well as an intervention by mayor Sadiq Khan.

The current lease of the cinema is set to expire in 2024. Court action over the tenancy will take place in the High Court between the landlord and owner, 38 Curzon Lease Ltd and the current tenant, Curzon Cinemas. The landlord wishes to run the building as an independent cinema and cultural hub, after restoring the building's original features. Celebrities such as Tilda Swinton and Steven Spielberg have expressed their support behind the efforts to maintain control of the cinema under Curzon's ownership.
