= The Promoter (2013 film) =

The Promoter is a 2013 independent feature documentary film made by Ragged Crow film production company. The film was produced by Sam Edwards and directed by Ed Edwards. The Promoter premiered at The London Independent Film Festival in 2013. It won two awards at the United Film Festival: Best Documentary Award and the Audience Award.

== Synopsis ==
The documentary follows Robert Pereno, who should be a household name, but every time he is on the brink of greatness, he somehow manages to mess it up.

== Cast ==
- Robert Pereno
- Adam Ant
- Rusty Egan
- Eve Ferret
- Lowri-Ann Richards
- Gaz Mayall
- Mandy Fuller

== Accolades ==
The film won Best Feature Documentary Award as well as the Audience Award at United Film Festival. At the Indie Gathering International Festival 2013 it was nominated Best Documentary and it also received a nomination for Best Film at The Portobello Film Festival 2013.

== Reception ==
"Possibly the most famous person you've never heard of," reviewed Dan Carrier, Camden New Journal, in April 2013. "The Promoter makes clear that boring is perhaps the one thing this 56-year-old is not. Documenting his past infamy as a nightclub promoter who could have shocked Iggy Pop into sobriety, director Ed Edwards also captures the modern-day Pereno at a creative peak, before disaster inevitably strikes," said Alex Bellotti of the Hampstead & Highgate Express on 16 May 2013.
