= Sunningdale =

Village in Berkshire, England

Coordinates: 51.398°N 0.626°W

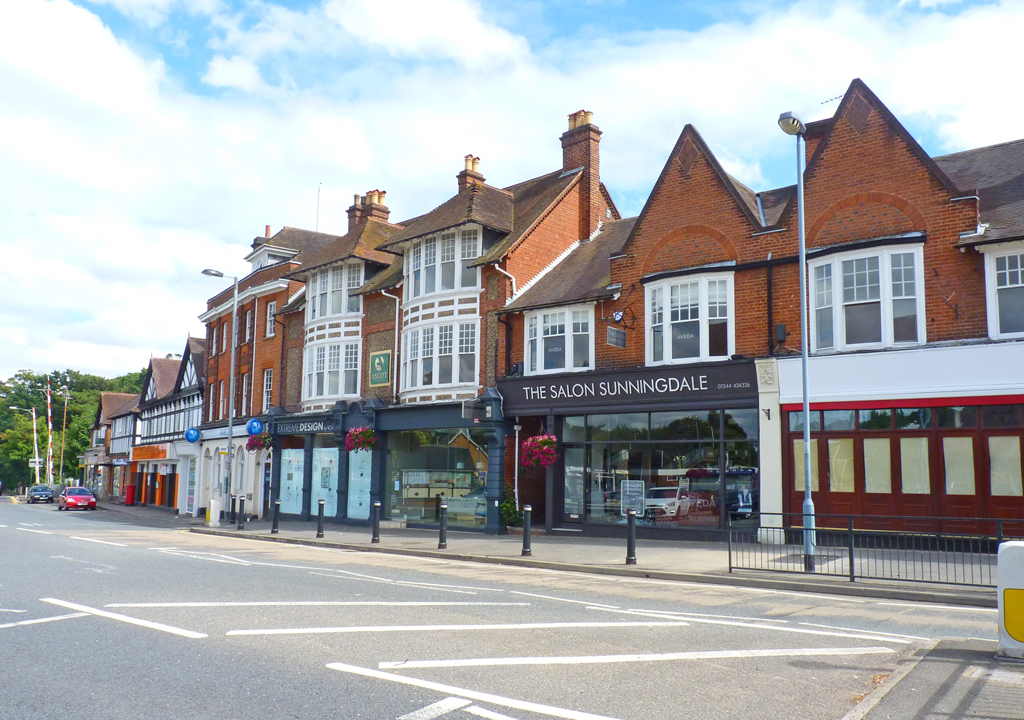
- Shops on London Road

- Location within Berkshire
- Population: 4,875 (2001); 5,347 (2011 Census)
- OS grid reference: SU955675
- Civil parish: Sunningdale
- Unitary authority: Windsor and Maidenhead
- Ceremonial county: Berkshire
- Region: South East
- Country: England
- Sovereign state: United Kingdom
- Post town: ASCOT
- Postcode district: SL5
- Dialling code: 01344
- Police: Thames Valley
- Fire: Royal Berkshire
- Ambulance: South Central
- UK Parliament: Windsor

Sunningdale is a village and civil parish in Berkshire, England. Located in the Royal Borough of Windsor and Maidenhead, it takes up the extreme southeast corner of Berkshire and is adjoined by green buffers including Sunningdale Golf Club and Wentworth Golf Club. Its northern peripheral estates adjoin Virginia Water Lake.

== Location ==
Sunningdale adjoins Surrey, and is east of Sunninghill from which it takes its name. It is south of Virginia Water Lake. It is centred 23.2 miles (37.3 km) west south-west of Charing Cross, London. The nearest major towns are Bracknell, Camberley, Staines upon Thames and Woking. It is connected to two of these by the A30 old trunk road. Sunningdale railway station is on the Waterloo to Reading line.

== History ==
The present-day civil parish of Sunningdale came into existence in 1894 under the provisions of the Local Government Act 1894; the village had previously been part of Old Windsor. It was, until 1995, partly in Berkshire and partly in Surrey. The Surrey area of the village, known as Broomhall, was also split between the boroughs of Surrey Heath and Runnymede. This original arrangement caused problems and was resolved after much consultation locally between the two county councils, three borough councils and four parish councils. As a result, its former Surrey neighbourhoods merged with the rest in the Royal Borough of Windsor and Maidenhead, in the Royal County of Berkshire (which became a non-administrative county in 1995). The area is popular with professional golfers due to its adjoining green buffers including Sunningdale Golf Club and Wentworth Golf Club.

=== Charters ===
Charters is a Grade II-listed art deco mansion, built in 1938 for the industrialist Frank Parkinson by the architects Adie, Button and Partners. It was built on the site of an earlier country house built in the late 1860s by William Terrick Hamilton. Parkinson's guests included Sir Winston Churchill and the Duke and Duchess of Windsor. In 1949, the house was bought by Sir Montague Burton. It later became a corporate headquarters and has since been redeveloped as an apartment complex and spa.

=== Coworth House ===
Now Coworth Park Hotel, this is a late 18th-century country house which was the home of Edward Stanley, 17th Earl of Derby, Secretary of State for War and British Ambassador to France in the early 20th-century.

=== Sunningdale Park ===
The Sunningdale Agreement was signed at Sunningdale Park, at the Civil Service Staff College (now the National School of Government) on 9 December 1973, a precursor of the Northern Ireland peace process.

== Notable residents ==
- Tittenhurst Park

- John Lennon
- Yoko Ono
- Ringo Starr
- Sheikh Zayed bin Sultan Al Nahyan

- Richard Beckinsale
- Agatha Christie
- Darren Clarke
- Junior Campbell
- Diana Dors
- Philip Hanson
- Chesney Hawkes
- Joseph Dalton Hooker
- Alex Jones
- Gary Lineker
- Paul McGinley
- Billy Ocean
- Marcus Österdahl
- Cliff Richard
- Five Star
- David Thewlis
