= Greaves Cotton =

Indian engineering company

Greaves Cotton Limited
- Type: Public
- Traded as: BSE: 501455; NSE: GREAVESCOT
- Industry: Engineering; Manufacturing
- Founded: 1859
- Headquarters: Mumbai, Maharashtra, India
- Number of locations: Mumbai; Pune; Aurangabad; Chennai; Bengaluru
- Area served: India
- Key people: Parag Satpute (Managing Director and Group CEO); Manish Poddar (Group CFO)
- Products: Engines; Electric Vehicles; Farm Equipment; Spare Parts; Auxiliary Power; Control Systems
- Website: greavescotton.com

Greaves Cotton Ltd. is an Indian engineering company with businesses in powertrain solutions, electric mobility, automotive components and related services. Founded in 1859, the company initially developed its business around engines and engineering products and has since expanded into electric mobility and other automotive and engineering segments. The company is listed on the National Stock Exchange of India and the Bombay Stock Exchange (BSE). Through its businesses, Greaves Cotton has a distribution and retail network across India, supported by more than 20,000 mechanics.

== History ==
The company was founded in 1859 by James Greaves and George Cotton. It was incorporated in 1922 as a private limited company. Greaves Cotton was purchased by Lala Karam Chand Thapar of the Thapar Group in 1947. It was converted into a public limited company in 1950. Greaves Cotton was purchased by Lala Karam Chand Thapar of the Thapar Group in 1947. It was converted into a public limited company in 1950.

In FY2013, Greaves Cotton recorded revenue of ₹1,873 crore, compared with ₹1,753 crore in the previous FY, an increase of about 6.8%. By 2026, Greaves Cotton recorded consolidated revenue of ₹3,437 crore, an 18% increase from the previous financial year. In the fourth quarter of FY2026, consolidated revenue was ₹1,000 crore, representing a year-on-year increase of 22%.

In May 2019, Ampere Vehicles launched the Zeal, a high-speed electric scooter eligible for benefits under the Indian government's Faster Adoption and Manufacturing of Electric Vehicles (FAME II) scheme. The scooter had a claimed top speed of 55 km/h and a range of 75 km, with a charging time of about 5.5 hours. In FY2019, Greaves Cotton recorded revenue of ₹1,988 crore, compared with ₹1,790 crore in the previous financial year, an increase of approximately 11%.

In December 2020, Greaves Cotton closed its Ranipet plant in Tamil Nadu as part of a restructuring and plant-consolidation exercise. Engine production from the facility was shifted to the company's plant in Aurangabad, Maharashtra.

In Feb 2023, the company announced the agreement by signing the binding terms to acquire a 100% stake through multiple tranches in Excel ControLinkage Pvt. Ltd. The acquisition will cost ₹385 crore and it will be completed in four phases.

In November 2025, Greaves Cotton introduced its Greaves.Next business strategy, which grouped its operations into three areas: Energy Solutions, Mobility Solutions and Industrial Solutions. The strategy also outlined plans to expand existing businesses, develop new products and capabilities, and enter additional markets. In December 2025, Greaves Cotton was recognised as the "Best Governed Company – Listed Segment: Emerging Category" at the 25th ICSI National Awards for Excellence in Corporate Governance.

== Products ==
Greaves Cotton produces powertrains for diesel, petrol and kerosene applications, as well as diesel pump sets, gensets, agricultural equipment, electric mobility products and aftermarket components and services. Its engineering business also supplies mechanical and electronic motion-control systems.

- Automotive Engines
- Gensets
- ePowertrain

== Greaves Cotton group companies ==
- Greaves Electric Mobility - designing and manufacturing of two and three wheelers electric vehicles
- Greaves Finance Limited - financing solutions for electric vehicles
- Greaves Retail and Distribution - retail and servicing for e3W, ICE 3W, and SCV
  - Retail company exports its spares parts to Sri Lanka and Bangladesh.
- Greaves Technologies Limited - engineering research and development and digital services
- Greaves Engineering - fuel agnostic powertrain solutions (auto and non-auto)

== Investments and acquisitions ==
In Oct 2018, the group first invested ₹77 crore in Coimbatore-based electric vehicle (EV) manufacturer Ampere Vehicles by acquiring a 67.34% stake. Within a year, the company again invested ₹38.49 crore and increased the stakes to 81.23% in Jul 2019. Greaves Cotton wholly owned the Coimbatore-based electric vehicle manufacturer Ampere Electric Vehicles. The acquisition marked the entry into the EV industry.

In Jun 2021, the company signed an MoU with the Tamil Nadu government to invest about ₹700 crore over ten years for a plant with an annual capacity of 1 million units, with the initial production capacity being 1 lakh units per annum.

In Feb 2023, the company announced the agreement by signing the binding terms to acquire a 100% stake through multiple tranches in Excel ControLinkage Pvt. Ltd. The acquisition will cost ₹385 crore and it will be completed in four phases. On 13 August 2026, Greaves Cotton Limited acquired the remaining 20% shareholding in Excel Controlinkage Private Limited through a secondary transaction, increasing its aggregate shareholding in the company to 100%. Following the completion of the transaction, Excel Controlinkage became a wholly owned subsidiary of Greaves Cotton Limited.

== Partnership ==
In Oct 2017, the group company strategically partnered with US and Bengaluru-based start-up company Altigreen Propulsion Labs to provide a range of clean energy powertrain solutions for three-wheeler and micro four-wheeler commercial vehicles.

In Jan 2023, the group company partnered with UK-based electric drive system design company Eta Green Power to share the rights of their technology in the Indian two and three-wheeler segment.

In April 2025, Greaves Cotton announced a partnership with Chara Technologies to manufacture synchronous reluctance motors and controllers. The products were intended for automotive and non-automotive applications, including L5 three-wheelers, golf carts and four-wheelers, with manufacturing planned at Greaves' facility in Shendra, Aurangabad.

In November 2025, Greaves Cotton announced a partnership with Ligier Group, under which its 499cc REVO D+ diesel engines, certified to Euro V+ standards, were supplied for Ligier's JS50 and Myli light quadricycle models. The engines were developed and manufactured at Greaves' facility in Chhatrapati Sambhajinagar.
