= Lindeteves-Jacoberg Limited =

Singaporean investment holding company

Lindeteves-Jacoberg Limited (LJL, SGX: L15 ), based in Singapore, is an investment holding company which provides management services to its subsidiaries. The subsidiaries are in the business of distribution of electric motors. The company was founded in 1947. It is listed on the Stock Exchange of Singapore.

== Liquidity problems ==
In 2006 the company experienced liquidity problems and was acquired by the Austrian-based ATB group. In 2011 ATB's parent A-TEC became insolvent and ATB itself was purchased by the Chinese company, Wolong Holding Group Co Ltd.

== Sold to ATB ==
The company was originally in the business of producing and distributing electric motors, as well as power generation, waste treatment systems and engineering. LJL purchased Australian-based motors manufacturer Western Electric in the 1990s, German-based motors manufacturer Schorch in 2001 and British-based motors manufacturer Brook Crompton in 2002. In 2010 all the manufacturing plants were sold to ATB, so that only the motors distribution subsidiaries remained.

== Downsizing ==
In 2004, the company closed/downsized the last remaining British plants in Huddersfield and Guiseley and moved production to Poland and China. The restructuring costs were high and turnover suffered. By 2010 the group's liabilities were reported to exceed its assets by more than 8 million SGD. The company was threatened by two lawsuits and could not be sure to have enough cash to cover these obligations. It was relying on financial support on its parent ATB, which relied on financial support from its ultimated parent, A-TEC Industries AG. However, in October 2010 A-TEC started court-supervised reorganisation proceedings.

== Wolong ==
In October 2011 ATB itself was sold to the Chinese motors manufacturer Wolong. One of the lawsuits was lost, but a subsidiary of Wolong purchased the judgment sum and agreed to pay 14 million SGD in five installments until 2016.

== Subsidiaries ==
As of 2011 LJL had the following subsidiaries:

- Brook Crompton UK Ltd., UK
- Brook Crompton Motor Inc., USA
- Brook Crompton Ltd., Canada
- Brook Motors International Pte Ltd, Singapore
- Western Electric Asia Pte Ltd, Singapore

Turnover in 2011 amounted to 52 million Singapore dollars.
