= Anita Thapar =

Welsh child psychiatrist

Anita Thapar CBE FRCPsych FMedSci FLSW
- Born: Wales
- Education: Welsh National School of Medicine; University of Wales College of Medicine
- Known for: Research on the causes of ADHD
- Scientific career
- Fields: Child and adolescent psychiatry
- Workplaces: Cardiff University
- Thesis: A twin study of psychiatric symptoms in childhood (1995)

Anita Thapar is a Welsh child psychiatrist who is professor of child and adolescent psychiatry at the Institute of Psychological Medicine and Clinical Neuroscience at Cardiff University. Her research focuses on risk factors for ADHD and major depression in children. She was elected a fellow of the Royal College of Psychiatrists in 1995, and of the Academy of Medical Sciences and Learned Society of Wales in 2011. In 2017, she received the Frances Hoggan Medal from the Learned Society of Wales and was named a Commander of the Order of the British Empire (CBE), both in recognition of her research in child and adolescent psychiatry.

== Education and research ==
Thapar was born in South Wales and educated at the Welsh National School of Medicine in Cardiff, where she received her MBBCh in 1985. She then worked at district general hospitals in Carmarthen and Swansea to complete her clinical training. She received her Ph.D. from the University of Wales College of Medicine in 1995. She then worked as a senior lecturer at Manchester University before being appointed Professor of Child and Adolescent Psychiatry at Cardiff University in 1999, making her the first such professor in Wales. Thapar is currently researching ADHD, autism and genetics.

== Biography ==
She is married to a former general practitioner and has two adult sons.

== Honours and awards ==
- UK Professor of Psychiatry Club: Academic Women in Psychiatry Award (joint) for enhancing the careers of academic women in psychiatry, 2017
- Learned Society of Wales: Frances Hoggan Medal for outstanding research by women in Science, Technology, Engineering, Medicine or Mathematics, 2017
- Queen's New Year Honours: CBE for services to Child and Adolescent Psychiatry, 2017
- President's Medal 2015, Royal College of Psychiatrists, UK for contribution to policy, public knowledge, education and meeting population and patient care needs, 2015
- Ruane Prize 2015, Brain and Behavior Research Foundation, USA for outstanding Child & Adolescent Psychiatric research, 2015
- Elected Fellow of the Academy of Medical Sciences (FMedSci), 2011
- Elected Fellow of the Learned Society of Wales, 2011
- Elected Fellow of the Royal College of Psychiatrists, 1995
- Laughlin Prize 1989 Royal College of Psychiatrists, UK for highest marks and best recommendation in MRCPsych examinations, 1989
- Maldwyn Catell Memorial Prize (Welsh Medical Council), Welsh National School of Medicine, 1985
- Geraint Walters Prize in Haematology, Welsh National School of Medicine, 1985
