= Stockwell Garage =

Bus depot in Stockwell, London, England

Coordinates: 51.474°N 0.124°W

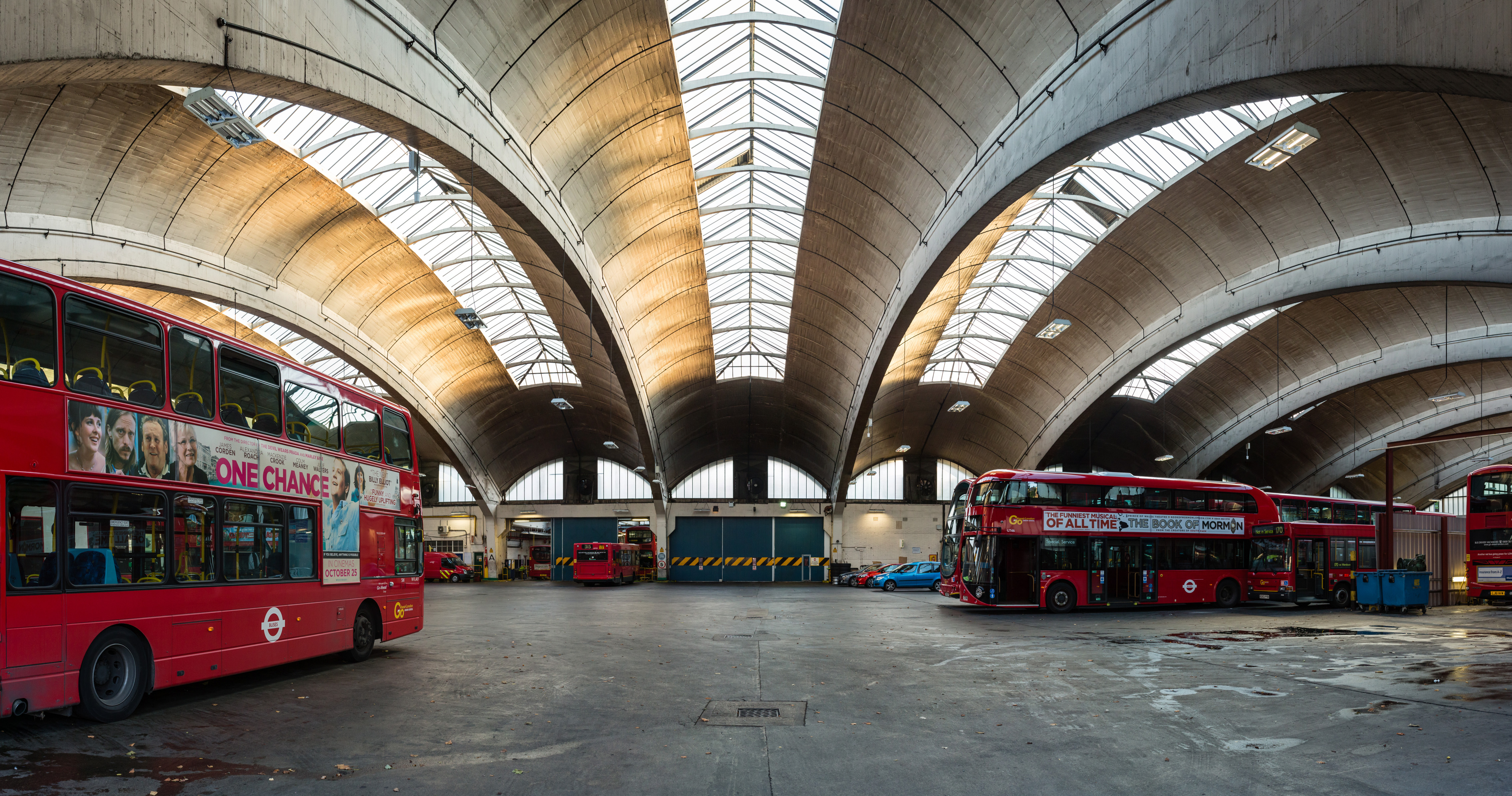
A panoramic view of the interior of Stockwell Garage

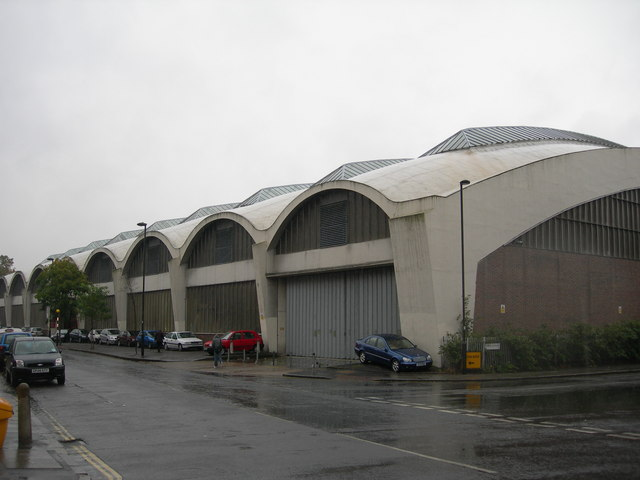
External view of the northwest corner of the garage, on Lansdowne Way (left) and Binfield Road (right)

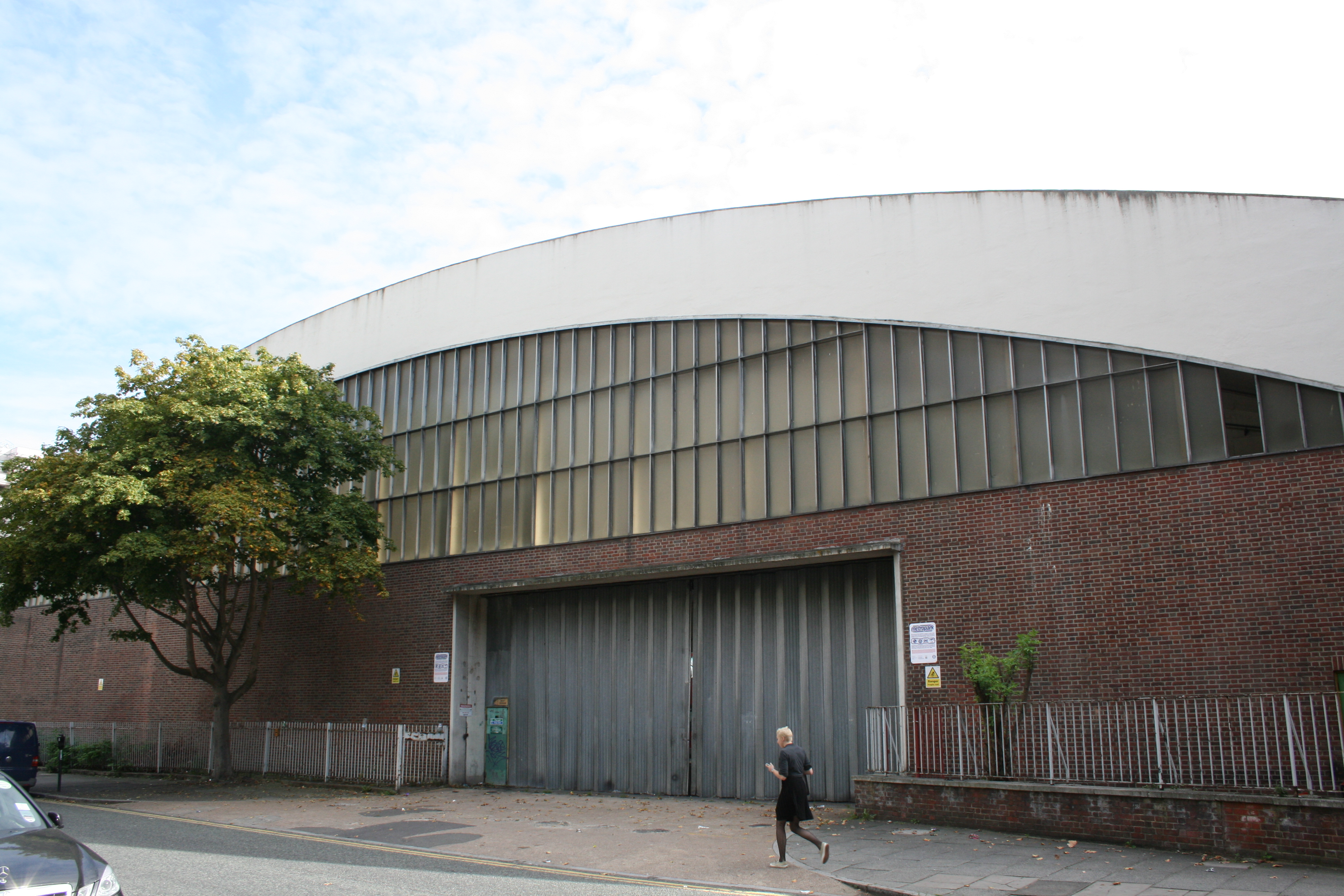
Gable end to Binfield Road to the west

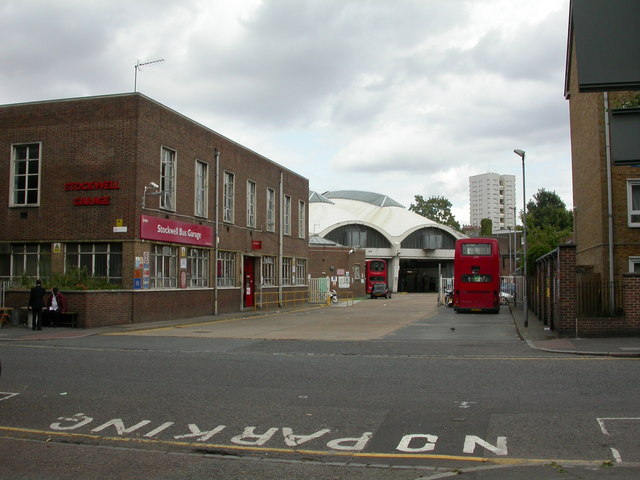
Entrance from Binfield Road to the south, past brick offices

Stockwell Garage is a large bus garage in Stockwell, in the London Borough of Lambeth, which opened in April 1952. At the time of construction it was Europe's largest unsupported roof span. The garage provides 73,350 sq ft (6,814 m^{2}) of unobstructed parking space and could originally house 200 buses, required at a time when the last trams were being replaced by buses.

== Architecture ==
On a cursory view of the exterior, the bus garage is typical of much of the architecture built in the post-war reconstruction period in London around the Festival of Britain. There was a steel shortage at the time, so concrete was used for the roof structure instead of the steel girder structure that had previously been the norm. At Stockwell, the opportunity was taken to create a bravura piece of reinforced concrete design, building on a formerly residential site cleared by the Blitz. It is a few hundred metres to the northwest of Stockwell Underground station.

The garage was designed by Adie, Button and Partners, with Thomas Bilbow, who was architect to the London Transport Executive, and the structural engineer from the firm of Alfred Edward Beer. The main contractor was Wilson Lovatt & Sons. The 393 ft (120 m) long roof structure is supported by ten very shallow "two-hinged" arched ribs. Each is 7 ft (2.1 m) deep at the centre of the arch, 10 ft 6 in (3.20 m) at the end, and spans 194 ft (59 m). The 42 ft (13 m) gap between each pair of ribs is spanned by a cantilevered barrel vault topped by large skylights. The vaults are crossed by smaller ribs to prevent torsion. Seen from the outside, the main arches are visible as outward-leaning buttresses, with a segmental curve to each bay forming a flowing roof line. The buttresses and ribs were cast in situ in sections, using the same reusable formwork. The bed of the subterranean River Effra was found to pass through the site during construction, which necessitated deeper foundations for the supporting concrete buttresses.

Three of the nine bays to Lansdowne Way to the north – the central bay and two end bays – have large double folding doors to permit access; other bays are glazed with twenty vertical lights. Each bay has segmental toplights with central louvres for ventilation. The gable ends are also glazed with vertical lights, with folding doors to Binfield Road to the west. The site also houses inspection pits, offices, and a canteen in one- and two-storey brick buildings filling the angle as Binfield Road turns past to the south.

== History ==
Since 1988, the garage has been a Grade II* listed building, reflecting its importance in post-war architectural and engineering history. It is coded "SW" by Transport for London. The writer Will Self has called the garage "the most important building in London".

During the privatisation of London bus services, it was included in the sale of London General to the Go-Ahead Group.
