= Sheraton Grand London Park Lane Hotel =

Hotel in London

Sheraton Grand London Park Lane
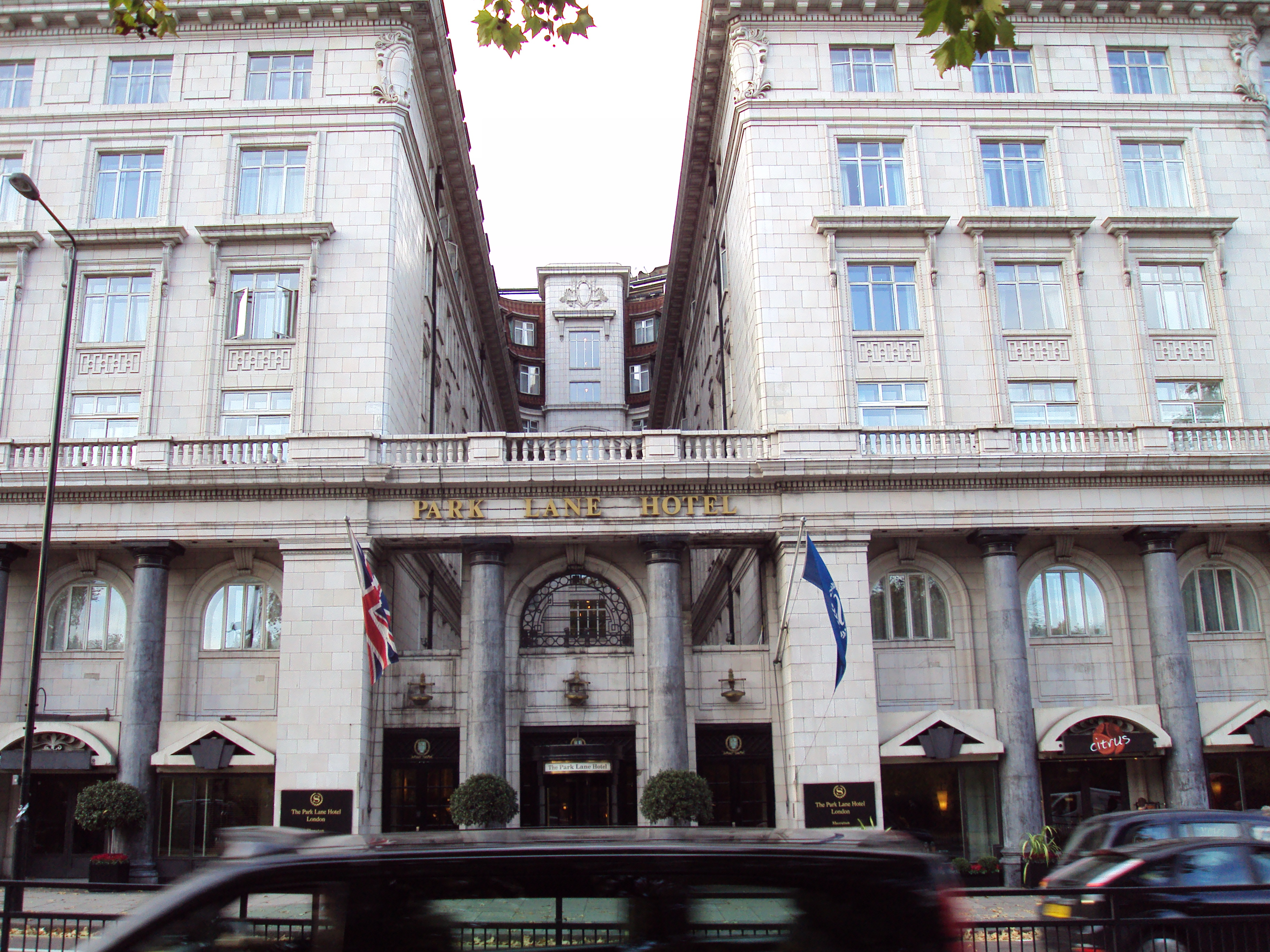

- Location within Central London

General information
- Location: Piccadilly, London, England, UK
- Coordinates: 51°30′17.5″N 0°08′50″W
- Opening: 1927 (99 years ago)
- Owner: Sir Richard Sutton's Settled Estates
- Operator: Sheraton

Technical details
- Floor count: 8

Design and construction
- Architects: C. W. Stephens; Adie, Button and Partners
- Developer: Sir Bracewell Smith

Other information
- Number of rooms: 302

Website
- Official website

The Sheraton Grand London Park Lane is a 5-star hotel on Piccadilly, London.

The hotel opened in 1927 as The Park Lane Hotel to designs by architects Adie, Button and Partners, in a grand Art Deco style, and was constructed by the developer Sir Bracewell Smith. The original architect had been C. W. Stephens, who designed Harrods, but work had stopped at the outbreak of the First World War, and Stephens died in 1917. The building is a fine example with a mansard roof and Portland stone facade. The building is Grade II listed and has 303 bedrooms on eight floors with the front overlooking Green Park towards Buckingham Palace.

The hotel was bought by ITT Sheraton in April 1996 for $70 million. ITT Sheraton was acquired by Starwood in 1998. Starwood sold its leasehold on the hotel to Sir Richard Sutton's Settled Estates in 2014, but continues to operate the property, under a long-term management contract. Though the hotel was a Sheraton property from 1996 on, it did not actually begin using the Sheraton name for twenty years, until 19 July 2016, when it was renamed Sheraton Grand London Park Lane upon the completion of a major renovation.

The hotel is featured in the films The End of the Affair (1999), The Golden Compass (2007), and the television miniseries The Winds of War (1983).
