= Gautam Thapar =

Indian businessman

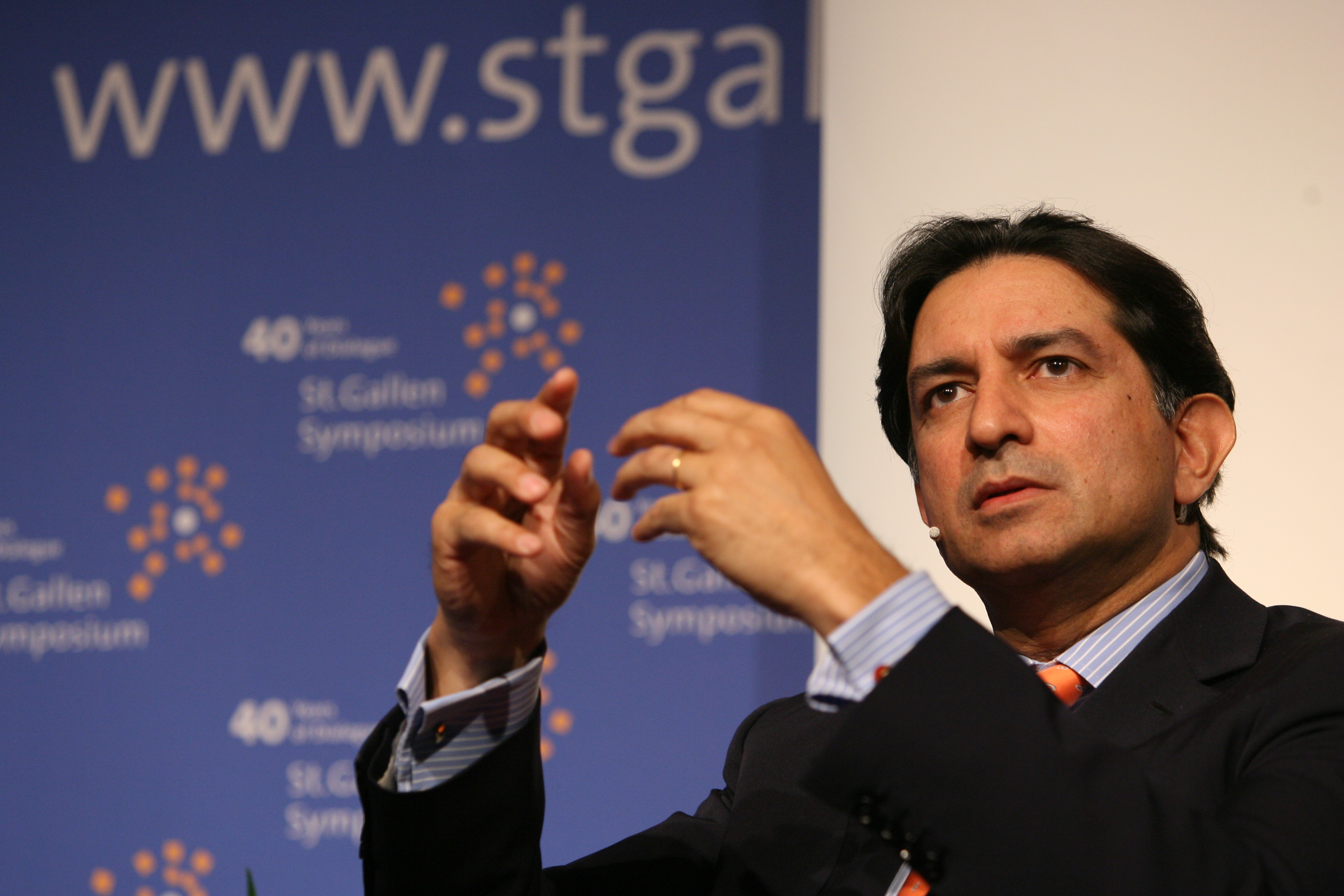
- St. Gallen Symposium, 2010
- Born: 7 December 1960 (age 65); Calcutta, West Bengal, India
- Education: The Doon School
- Alma mater: St. Stephen's College, Delhi; Pratt Institute
- Occupation: Businessman
- Organization: Avantha Group
- Spouse: Stephanie
- Children: 4
- Parent: Brij Mohan Thapar (father)
- Relatives: K. C. Thapar (grandfather); L. M. Thapar (uncle)
- Family: Thapar family

Gautam Thapar (born 7 December 1960) is an Indian businessman who is the chairman of Avantha Group and a member of the Thapar family. Thapar was noted as an industrialist; however, in 2019, he faced allegations of financial fraud which negatively impacted his businesses and included Thapar losing control of his largest company.

== Early life and background ==
Gautam Thapar belongs to the third generation of the Thapar family, founded by his grandfather Karam Chand Thapar, in Kolkata. Karam Chand had initially offered the reins of the family business to Gautum's father, Brij Mohan Thapar, bypassing his oldest son Inder Mohan Thapar. However, Brij Mohan passed on the chance to his younger brother Lalit Mohan Thapar, giving lack of desire and inability to shoulder the responsibility as the reasons.

=== Education ===
Thapar was educated at The Doon School and obtained his undergraduate degree from St. Stephen's College (at Delhi University). He later studied for an advanced degree in chemical engineering at the Pratt Institute in the United States. Failing to find a suitable job and with US visa nearing expiry, he returned to India.

== Business career ==
Early in his career, in 1985, Thapar first worked in KCTB 's manufacturing plant in Yamunanagar and then he moved to Andhra Pradesh Rayons, where he fixed the business relationship between the company and Grasim Industries. In 1997, Thapar had responsibility to turn around the BILT's chemical division, which was suffering losses due to management-labour conflicts and shortage of water and power. Gautam showed profits within a year, by scrapping the company's expansion plans, selling off a few assets and trying to resolve labour concerns. The family's assets were divided into four in 1999, with Gautam's older brother Karan parting ways in 2005. Gautam became the Chairman of Crompton Greaves on 22 July 2004.

When Lalit Mohan Thapar retired, he chose his nephew Thapar over Vikram. In 2005, Lalit Mohan handed over the reins of the business empire to Thapar along with his voting rights, shares and most of his personal effects in his will. Thapar became the Chairman of the Group on 1 July 2006. Thapar was not initially Lalit Mohan's choice of heir and eventually gained control of his share of the Thapar Group businesses through a power struggle with his other family members. In 2007, he renamed his corporate group to Avantha Group.

=== Allegations of fraud ===
On 29 August 2019, Thapar was sacked as Chairman of CG Power and Industrial Solutions with immediate effect after an investigation that unearthed a multi crore financial scam at the firm. On 20 August 2019, the company had stated that an investigation instituted by its board had found major governance and financial lapses in the company. In August 2021, the Enforcement Directorate (ED) is probing 3 cases of money laundering involving Thapar and the Yes Bank. Thapar, the promoter of the Avantha Group, was arrested by the ED in connection with an alleged money laundering case. Thapar was arrested by authorities under the Prevention of Money Laundering Act (PMLA) on August 3 following raids that were conducted by the ED in Mumbai and Delhi according to a report by PTI.

In 2022, he was granted bail by the Bombay High Court and he was also granted interim bail by the Delhi High Court on medical grounds. In December 2022, the CBI filed a charge sheet against Thapar as well as former CEO and Managing Director of Yes Bank Rana Kapoor for their alleged bank fraud. In August 2024, the ED, as part of their investigations into the PMLA case against Thapar, attached Rs 678 core worth of assets of the Avantha Group. In September 2024, the ED, as part of the probe into the alleged bank fraud, attached 24 properties worth Rs 78 crore of a company beneficially owned by Thapar.

== Non-business activities ==
Thapar is the President of Thapar University and former Chairman of the Ananta Aspen Centre. He was also on the Board of Governors of his alma mater, the Doon School. In 2010, he took over as the chairman of the board of governors of the Mumbai-based business school NITIE, for a 4-year period. He also promotes golf and is president of the Professional Golf Tour of India. The EUR 1.8m Avantha Masters, tri-sanctioned by the European Tour, the Asian Tour and the Professional Golf Tour of India, is India's richest golf event and synonymous with professional international golf in India.

== Awards ==
He received the Ernst & Young Entrepreneur of the Year Award for Manufacturing in 2008.

== Personal life ==
Thapar has been married twice. His second wife is Stephanie. Thapar has 4 children.

== See also ==
- Avantha Group
