= Frank Parkinson =

British businessman (1887–1946)

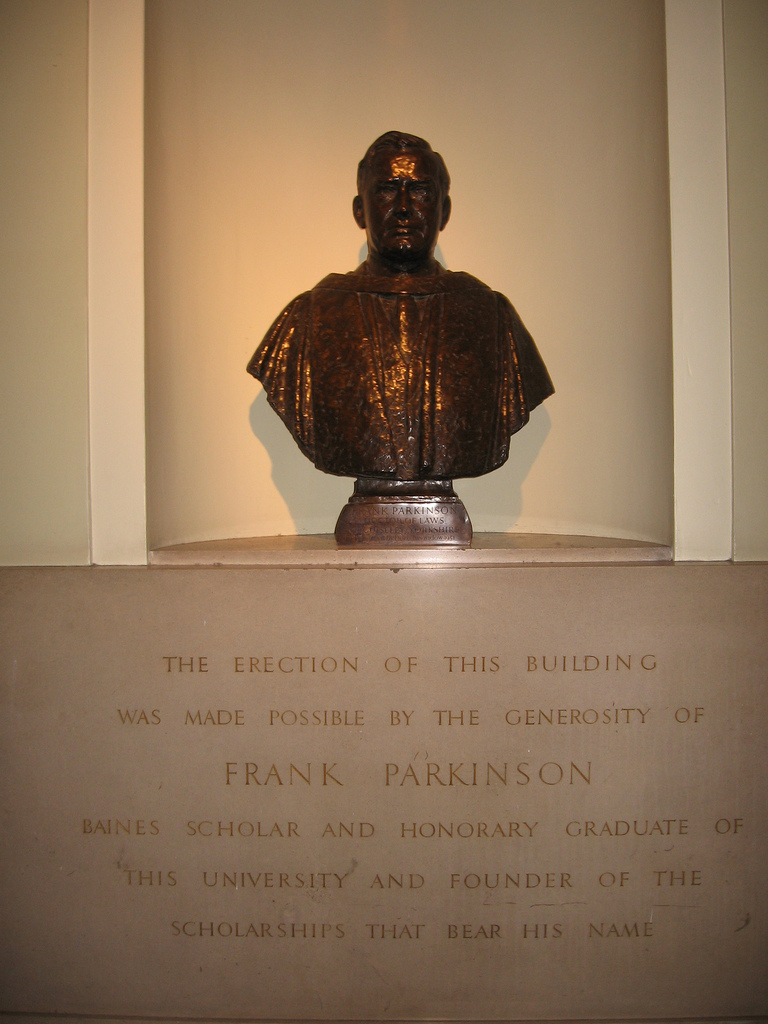
- Born: 7 February 1887; Guiseley, West Riding of Yorkshire
- Died: 28 January 1946 (aged 58); Sunninghill, Berkshire
- Engineering career
- Practice name: Crompton Parkinson

Frank Parkinson (7 February 1887 – 28 January 1946) was a British electrical engineer, most notable for early electric lighting installations, such as light bulbs and electric motors. He was a major benefactor to the University of Leeds with the landmark tower (appearing on the university logo) named in his honour.

== Life ==
The son of a stonemason, originally from Guiseley, he began his studies in electrical engineering in 1908 at Leeds University. He first worked for local firm Rhodes Motors before setting up F & A. Parkinson and Company in partnership with his brother Albert. The firm continued to grow making Frank "Yorkshire's quietest millionaire."

In 1927 he took over Crompton and Co. to form Crompton Parkinson. Crompton and Co. was one of the oldest lighting companies in the world, founded in 1878 by Colonel REB Crompton, a multi-talented entrepreneur who designed and installed some of the earliest recorded electric lighting installations at buildings such as Windsor Castle and Holyrood Palace. Established as an industry leader, Crompton Parkinson was taken over by the Hawker Siddeley aerospace group in 1968 and the Crompton range continued to be further diversified to incorporate cable, fuses, batteries and metering instruments in addition to lamps and luminaires. On 17 May 2002, the factory in his home town closed down.

After seeing plans for the new Leeds University buildings in 1936, Parkinson, by then one of West Yorkshire's most successful businessmen, offered to pay for the entrance hall and tower. The Parkinson Building and Tower has been a major landmark in Leeds and a defining feature of the University since its opening on 9 November 1951.

He lived at Charters near Ascot, in an art deco home which has since been converted into flats. After Parkinson's death, the house was loaned to the Duke and Duchess of Windsor when they returned to England in 1947 and two years later it was bought by Sir Montague Burton, boss of the Leeds tailoring empire. Since 1959 it has been owned by Vickers Research and the DeBeers diamond mining company.

There is a picture of him at the National Portrait Gallery

== Legacy ==
The Frank Parkinson Scholarship was established in 1936 for students at Leeds University. In announcing his gift, he stated, “I have long cherished the ambition to do something to ensure that the kind of assistance which was extended to me as a student should be available to a larger number of Yorkshire students, especially those who might otherwise be unable to contemplate a University career, or who, in spite of proved ability, might be unable to carry on postgraduate research work through lack of means.” In 2009 it was available for full-time post-graduate research and was worth £8000.

Two trusts were set up following his death from the proceeds of his estate: the Frank Parkinson Yorkshire Trust and the smaller Frank Parkinson Agricultural Trust.

The Yorkshire Trust contributes towards a complex of 43 flats and bungalows offering sheltered accommodation in Guiseley. It has a long waiting list, with potential residents waiting 10 years prior to entry. The complex was valued at nearly £5 million in 2005.

In 2001, £100,000 was donated by his trust to fund work at the Frank Parkinson Tissue Engineering Laboratory at Leeds University. In 2004 the trust donated £223,000 to Wharfedale hospital in order that it could purchase a new fluoroscopy suite. In addition, there are many other smaller donations made annually.

The Frank Parkinson Agricultural Trust Deed dated 4 May 1943, has as its principal objective the improvement and welfare of British agriculture. The managers of this fund try to produce an income of £50,000 annually and helped to fund the new library at Harper Adams University College.

There are two roads named after him: Frank Parkinson Court in Guiseley (the location of the alms houses) and Parkinson Drive (the location of the former Crompton Parkinson factory). There is also a centre at Hartpury College which bears his name.

The student halls of residence at Seale-Hayne Agricultural College also bear his name (Frank Parkinson Hall). They are now a part of Hannahs at Seale-Hayne operated by The Dame Hannah Rogers Trust.
