= Karam Chand Thapar =

Indian businessman (1900–1962)

- Born: 1900; Chandigarh, British India
- Died: 1962 (aged 61–62); Calcutta, India
- Occupation: Founder of Thapar Group
- Children: 7: Inder Mohan; Brij Mohan; L. M. Thapar; Man Mohan; Raj; Prem; Janak
- Relatives: Thapar family

Karam Chand Thapar (1900–1962) was the founder of the Thapar Group of companies.

He was originally from Punjab. He started his career in 1920 as a coal trader in Calcutta, and built up the family fortune through Karam Chand Thapar and Bros. He then started JCT Limited which is into textiles as well as molasses and alcohol. He also took over the Oriental Bank of Commerce, and ventured into paper manufacturing with the Ballarpur Industries Limited.

In 1956, he started Thapar Institute of Engineering and Technology which was given the status of Deemed University in 1985 and renamed as Thapar University.

== Biography ==
Thapar established Karam Chand Thapar & Bros. Ltd., the holding company of Karam Chand Thapar & Bros. (Coal Sales) Ltd. (KCT). Having gained some experience of the coal industry in his youth, Thapar set out to establish his own coal trading business based out of the Jharia coalfields in 1919. Soon thereafter, he realized that the epicenter of the coal business was not where the mines were located, but in Calcutta, the then established base of all the large European owned mining companies.

A year later, in 1920, he set out for Calcutta, the erstwhile capital of India. That same year, he started a successful coal distribution business based out of Calcutta. As a leader, Thapar managed to consolidate a diverse group of investors and contractors, and incorporate them into his coal distribution network.

Thapar did not focus on coal alone but also ventured into other fields like paper, textiles, chemicals, sugar as well as banking (Oriental Bank of Commerce) and insurance (United Indian Insurance). In 1929, the flagship parent company of the Thapar Group, Karam Chand Thapar & Bros. Ltd., was formed. In the course of time, various companies owned and/or managed by K Thapar were brought under its umbrella.

== Personal life ==
Born in 1900, Thapar died in 1963 and was survived by four sons: Inder Mohan Thapar, Brij Mohan Thapar, Lalit Mohan Thapar, and Man Mohan Thapar.

Following Thapar's death, his third son Lalit was made head of the business, with the undertaking that the latter would ensure that Inder Mohan's son would be given the reins after Lalit turns 65, and that all of Lalit's brothers would be given their due share of the family business.

Lalit stood by his word to his dying father and did over the years divide the group among his brothers; the fact that he was a life-long bachelor with no children was helpful in this. However, Lalit gave the reins of the bigger part of the company to Gautam Thapar, son of Brij Mohan, and gave the chemicals division to Vikram Thapar, the son of Inder Mohan.

Karam Chand was survived by four sons, named above, and by at least one daughter, Mrs. Surinder Lal. The latter is the mother of two daughters: former bank CEO Naina Lal Kidwai, a former bank CEO, and of Nonita Lal Qureishi, whose husband, Faisal Qureishi, is a Pakistani golf champion.
