= Thapar Group =

Indian conglomerate

The Thapar Group is an Indian conglomerate founded by Karam Chand Thapar. The following companies are or have been a part of the group: Greaves Cotton, The Pioneer, Sohna Stud Farm Pvt Limited, TT & G Trading Pvt Limited, Built Middle East Pvt Limited, Himalayan Hideaways Pvt Limited, Karam Chand Thapar & Bros Limited, Lavasa Corporation Limited and KCT Papers Limited.

== Divisions ==
Inder Mohan Thapar's son Vikram Thapar and grandson Varun Thapar look after the KCT group which includes KCT Coal Sales (KCT Bros), the Calcutta-based coal trading business. Vikram M. Thapar started Waterbase Ltd in the 90s with primary business of aquaculture including prawn farms for exports. After Lalit Mohan Thapar's death in 2007, his nephew Gautam Thapar (son of Brij Mohan Thapar and grandson of Karam Chand Thapar) formed Avantha Group and took the reins of BILT, which was the flagship company of the group.

Gautam's brother Karan took over the holding company Karun Carpets Private Limited which took over DBH International (including Kaolin India), Bharat Starch Products, DBH Investments and which got the majority of Greaves Cotton, Premium Transmission, DBH Holding, Greaves Leasing, Dee Greaves, DBH Consulting and Ampere Vehicles.

JCT Mills FC was the football club of JCT Mills till it was disbanded in 2011. The club has competed in top tier leagues of India, National Football League (India) alongside Punjab State Super Football League.
