= Fortis Healthcare =

Indian multinational chain of private hospitals pvt ltd

Fortis Healthcare Limited

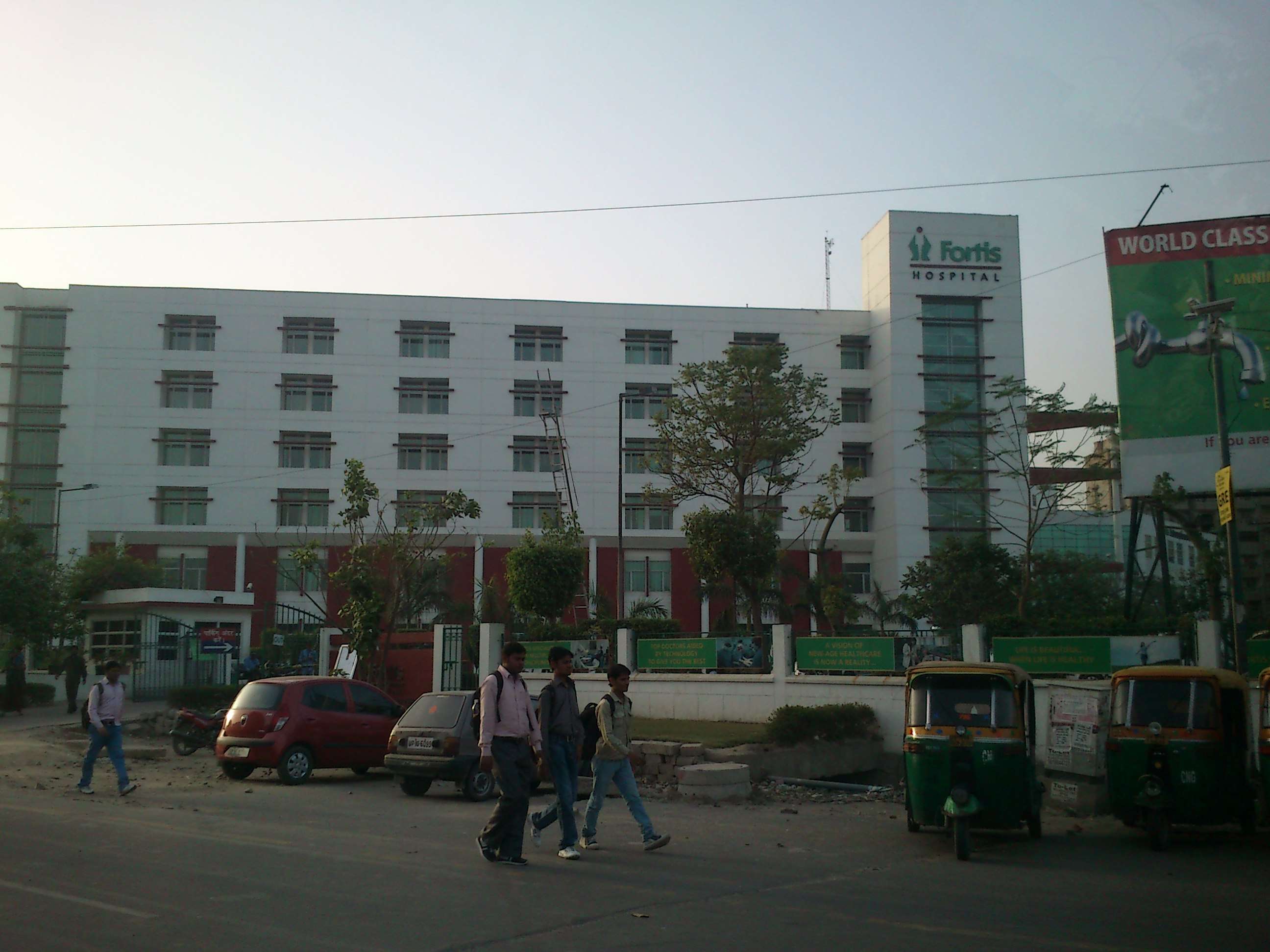
- Fortis Hospital, Noida
- Type: Public
- Traded as: BSE: 532843; NSE: FORTIS
- Industry: Healthcare
- Founded: 1996; 30 years ago
- Headquarters: Gurgaon, India
- Area served: Worldwide
- Key people: Ravi Rajagopal (Chairman)
- Products: Hospitals, Pharmacy, Diagnostic centres
- Revenue: ▲₹7,783 crore (US$810 million) (2025)
- Operating income: ▲₹1,588 crore (US$160 million) (2025)
- Net income: ▲₹809 crore (US$84 million) (2025)
- Owner: IHH Healthcare (31.1%)
- Number of employees: 23,000 (2023)
- Subsidiaries: Agilus Diagnostics
- Website: www.fortishealthcare.com
- Footnotes; Financials as of 31 March 2025.

Fortis Healthcare Limited is an Indian for-profit private hospital network headquartered in Gurgaon.

The Fortis Memorial Research Institute (FMRI) in Gurgaon serves as the headquarters for Fortis Healthcare. In addition to its Gurgaon facility, Fortis Healthcare operates hospitals in the Delhi NCR, including locations in Faridabad, Noida, Vasant Kunj, and Shalimar Bagh, along with other facilities across India, Dubai, and Sri Lanka. The company currently manages 36 healthcare facilities.

== History ==
Fortis Healthcare was founded in 1996 as an offshoot of the pharmaceutical company Ranbaxy Laboratories. It began operating in Mohali, Punjab, where its first hospital was established. It later expanded by acquiring the healthcare division of Escorts Group, including the Escorts Heart and Research Center, Okhla, Delhi.

In February 2018, founders Malvinder Singh and Shivinder Singh resigned from the board of Fortis Healthcare following allegations that they had siphoned $78 million out of the company. A month earlier, the Delhi High Court had upheld a 2016 Singapore arbitration tribunal order against the Singh brothers to pay ₹3,500 crore ($550 million) in damages to Daiichi Sankyo for misrepresenting information during the sale of Ranbaxy Laboratories.

In March 2018, Manipal Hospitals and TPG Capital offered to buy out Singh brothers' stake in Fortis Healthcare for ₹3,900 crore. After a bidding war, Malaysia's IHH Healthcare completed the acquisition of a 31.1% controlling stake for ₹4,000 crore. Representatives from IHH Healthcare were appointed to the board of Fortis. Later that year, IHH Healthcare halted its tender offer to buy an additional 26% stake from public shareholders after the Supreme Court ordered a status quo in response to Daiichi Sankyo's contempt plea against the Singh brothers over the stake sale.

In 2019, Fortis Healthcare announced the acquisition of RHT Health Trust (RHT) assets for an enterprise value of ₹4,650 crore.

In August 2023, Fortis announced the completion of its acquisition of Medeor Hospital in Manesar from VPS Healthcare for $27.23 million.

In 2024, Fortis Healthcare announced that it would acquire a 31% stake held by private equity firms in its diagnostics subsidiary, Agilus Diagnostics, for ₹1,780 crore.

In 2025, IHH Healthcare announced that the operations & management (O&M) of its other Indian subsidiary, Gleneagles Hospitals, will be taken over by Fortis Healthcare.

== See also ==
- Healthcare in India
- Medanta
