= G.S.K. Velu =

Indian healthcare entrepreneur

Gomathy Babu Sadacharam Kulandaivelu
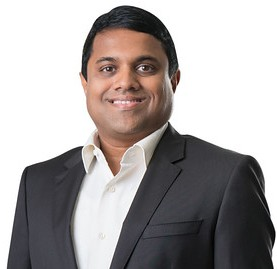
- Born: Aralvaimozhy, Kanyakumari district, Tamil Nadu, India
- Education: BITS Pilani (B.Pharm); LIBA (MBA)
- Occupations: Healthcare entrepreneur, business executive
- Title: Honorary Consul of the Republic of Estonia

Gomathy Babu Sadacharam Kulandaivelu Velu (also known as G. S. K. Velu) is an Indian healthcare entrepreneur. He is the founder of Trivitron Healthcare and Neuberg Diagnostics, companies operating in the medical technology and diagnostics sectors in India and abroad.

== Early life and education ==
Velu was born in Aralvaimozhy, Kanyakumari district, Tamil Nadu. He attended a Tamil‑medium school near Madurai before earning a pharmacy degree from BITS Pilani in 1988 and an MBA from Loyola Institute of Business Administration, Chennai. He later completed doctoral studies in pharmacology at IBAM, Kolkata, and was later awarded an honorary doctorate by Vel's University.

== Career ==
Velu began his career in the medical devices and diagnostics sector in the late 1980s, working in technical and regional roles with companies involved in medical equipment and laboratory diagnostics in India and Southeast Asia.

In 1997, he founded Trivitron Healthcare in Chennai. The company initially operated as a distributor for international medical equipment brands before moving into manufacturing. In the mid-2010s, Trivitron established a medical technology park in Chennai as part of its manufacturing expansion.

In 1999 Velu acquired a 50% stake in a pathology laboratory business in Mumbai, which was later corporatized as Metropolis Healthcare. His family retained a significant minority shareholding alongside the founding promoters and financial investors. He exited the company in 2015 by selling his remaining stake to private equity firm The Carlyle Group, following a shareholder dispute relating to management control and stake dilution.

=== Neuberg Diagnostics ===
In 2017, Velu re-entered the diagnostic sector by founding Neuberg Diagnostics, an alliance of pathology laboratories operating across India and selected international markets. By the mid-2020s, Neuberg Diagnostics had established laboratory operations in India, the United Arab Emirates, and South Africa.

=== Maxivision Eye Hospitals and other ventures ===
Velu partnered with ophthalmologist Kasu Prasad Reddy in the expansion of Maxivision Eye Hospitals, which operates a network of specialty eye hospitals and clinics across multiple regions in India. In 2016, Velu invested in Kauvery Hospital, a Chennai-based hospital chain, where he holds a minority stake and serves on the board of directors. The group operates hospitals across Tamil Nadu and Karnataka. He has also entered into joint venture arrangements with Apollo Hospitals, resulting in minority shareholdings in Apollo Dialysis Clinics and Apollo Dental Ventures, which operate specialty dialysis and dental clinic networks in India.

== Public and diplomatic roles ==
Velu has been active in industry advocacy, serving as the chairperson of the Tamil Nadu State Council for the Federation of Indian Chambers of Commerce & Industry (FICCI) in 2021. In 2023, he was appointed as the Honorary Consul of the Republic of Estonia for the South Indian states of Tamil Nadu, Kerala, Andhra Pradesh, and Telangana.

== Awards and recognition ==
In 2017, Velu received the Industry Achievement Award in Medical Technology from Hurun Report India. He was later conferred the Cross of Merit by the Republic of Estonia for contributions to bilateral engagement. In 2024, he received an honorary doctorate from VISTAS.

== Challenges and controversies ==
=== Metropolis Healthcare boardroom dispute ===
In 2015, a public boardroom dispute arose between Velu and the Shah family, in which Velu held a stake. The dispute followed a transaction in which the Shah family, led by managing director Ameera Shah, increased their stake from 36% to 63% by purchasing the 27% shareholding held by private equity firm Warburg Pincus, resulting in a shift in management control. Velu alleged that the transaction had been carried out without adequate consultation and that his rights as a co-promoter had been bypassed.

In September 2015, the matter concluded when Velu divested his remaining stake in Metropolis Healthcare to private equity firm The Carlyle Group for an estimated ₹850–900 crore, marking his exit from the company.

=== Non-compete allegations ===
In 2017, The Carlyle Group issued a notice to Velu concerning potential breach of a non-compete agreement associated with Velu's 2015 exit from Metropolis Healthcare. The concerns were linked to his subsequent investments in the diagnostics sector through Neuberg Diagnostics. Velu denied any contractual violation, stating that he had complied with the terms of his exit agreement and that no legal proceedings were pending at the time.
