= Agilus Diagnostics =

Indian diagnostics chain

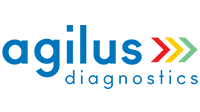
- Formerly: SRL Limited
- Type: Public
- Industry: Diagnostics
- Founded: 7 July 1995; 31 years ago
- Headquarters: Gurgaon, Haryana, India
- Number of locations: 418+
- Area served: India, Dubai, Afghanistan and Nepal
- Key people: Vijender Singh (MD & CEO)
- Services: Pathology, Radiology
- Revenue: ▲₹1,605 crore (US$170 million) (FY22)
- Operating income: ▲₹425 crore (US$45 million) (FY22)
- Owners: Fortis Healthcare (57.68%); NYLIM (15.86%); Resurgence PE (8.05%); IFC (7.61%)
- Subsidiaries: Agilus Pathlabs Reach Limited; DDRC Agilus Pathlabs Limited
- Website: agilusdiagnostics.com

Agilus Diagnostics Limited (formerly known as SRL Limited) is an Indian multinational diagnostics company providing diagnostic services in pathology and radiology. Agilus Diagnostics has its headquarters and corporate office in Gurgaon.

== History ==
The company was founded in 1995 by Dr. Parvinder Singh, Chairman and Managing Director of Ranbaxy Laboratories and James B. Peter, M.D., Ph.D., Chairman and CEO of Specialty Laboratories, Inc., Santa Monica, CA, USA, as Specialty Ranbaxy Limited (SRL), a 50:50 joint venture between Ranbaxy Laboratories and US-based Specialty Laboratories. It became the first pathology company in India to receive accreditation from National Accreditation Board.

In 2001, SRL became a wholly owned subsidiary of Ranbaxy Laboratories after Ranbaxy bought out Specialty Laboratories' stake; the company was subsequently renamed SRL Ranbaxy.

In 2008, SRL Ranbaxy was renamed as Super Religare Laboratories.

In 2010, Super Religare Laboratories acquired Piramal Diagnostic Services and its network of 107 laboratories from Piramal Healthcare for ₹600 crore.

In 2011, Fortis Healthcare completed the acquisition of 74.59% stake in Super Religare Laboratories. After being acquired by Fortis, the company rebranded itself as SRL Diagnostics.

In 2021, SRL Diagnostics acquired the remaining stake in its Kerala-based joint venture, DDRC, for ₹350 crore. With the addition of DDRC's 220 labs to its lab network, SRL became the biggest pathology lab chain in India with a total of 430 labs.

In 2023, SRL Diagnostics changed its name to Agilus Diagnostics.

== Arrest ==
In 2019, the founder of the company Shivinder Mohan Singh and Malvinder Mohan Singh were arrested for reported perceived crimes to the Delhi police Economic Offences Wing.
