= Kevin Kelly =

Kevin Kelly may refer to:

== Entertainment ==
- Kevin Kelly (publisher) (born 1937), Irish publisher and editor
- Kevin Kelly (editor) (born 1952), editor of Wired magazine and former editor of Whole Earth Catalog
- Kevin Kelly (announcer) (born 1967), American wrestling announcer and manager

== Politics ==
- Kevin Kelly (politician) (born 1953), American politician from Maryland
- Kevin C. Kelly, member of the Connecticut Senate

== Sports ==
=== American football ===
- Kevin Kelly (American football coach) (born c. 1960), American college football coach
- Kevin Kelly (placekicker) (born 1987), American college football placekicker

=== Other sports ===
- Kevin Kelly (Gaelic footballer) (1945–2024), Irish Gaelic footballer
- Kevin Kelly (boxer) (born 1969), Australian boxer
- Kevin Kelly (pitcher, born 1990), Dutch baseball player
- Kevin Kelly (pitcher, born 1997), American baseball player
- Kevin Kelly (hurler) (born 1993), Irish hurler
- Kevin Kelly (rugby league) (born 1960), Australian rugby league player
- Kevin Wacholz (born 1958), American professional wrestler also known as Kevin Kelly

== Other ==
- Kevin T. Kelly (1933–2018), British Roman Catholic priest and moral theologian
- L. Kevin Kelly, (born c. 1965), chief executive officer of Heidrick & Struggles

== See also ==
- Kevin Kelley (disambiguation)
