= The Vault (TV series) =

- Genre: Reality television
- Created by: Jatin Goel
- Starring: Rahul Singh; Vivek Bhargava; Mohit Geol; Ameera Shah; Sudip Bandyopadhyay; Anupam Mittal; Devansh Jain
- Country of origin: India
- Original languages: Hindi and English
- No. of seasons: 1
- No. of episodes: 12

Production
- Camera setup: Multiple-camera
- Running time: 30 minutes

Original release
- Network: ET Now; Times Now
- Release: 2016 – 2017

The Vault is an Indian Hindi and English business reality television series that airs on ET Now and Times Now. The show's first season featured 43 Indian start-ups that catered to multiple industry verticals. Of these, 16 start-ups received investments summing up to 11 crores Indian rupees at varying equity rates.

It shows budding entrepreneurs pitching their business or business ideas to a panel of investors called Vault Keepers and seeking funding for their ventures. The Vault Keepers decide whether to invest in their company.

== Series overview ==
Season	Episodes	Originally aired	
Season	Episodes	First aired	Last aired
1	12	October 2016	March 2018
2	TBA	TBA	TBA

== Investors ==
Vault Keepers	Company
Anupam Mittal	Founder and CEO of Shaadi.com and People Group
Rahul Singh	Founder and CEO of The Beer Cafe
Vivek Bhargava	CEO of iProspect India
Sudip Bandopadhyay	Chairman of Inditrade Capital
Ameera Shah	Managing director of Metropolis Healthcare
Devansh Jain	Director of Inox Wind
Mohit Goel	CEO of Omaxe

== See also ==
- Shark Tank India
- Dragons' Den (British TV programme)
