= Shivinder Mohan Singh =

Indian businessman

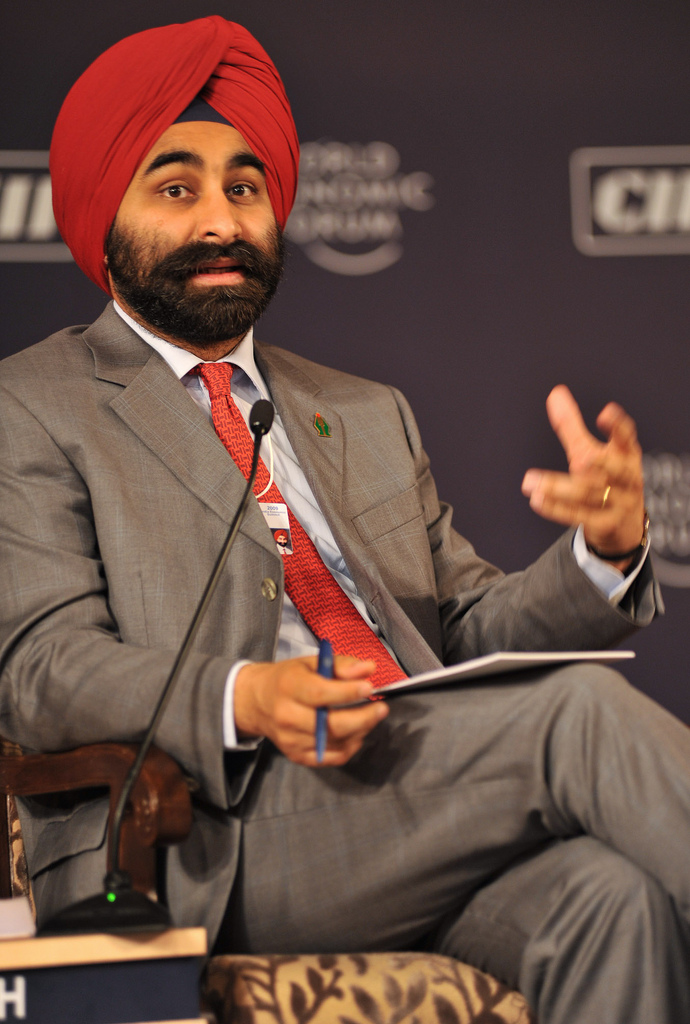
- Singh in 2009
- Education: St Stephen's College (BA); Duke University (MBA)
- Occupation: Businessman
- Criminal charges: Criminal breach of trust
- Criminal penalty: House arrest
- Children: 4
- Relatives: Malvinder Mohan Singh (brother); Bhai Mohan Singh (grandfather)

Shivinder Mohan Singh is an Indian businessman and erstwhile billionaire with Fortis Healthcare, Religare, and Ranbaxy Laboratories. Singh was the non-executive vice chairman of Fortis Healthcare. He is currently under arrest for criminal breach of trust along with his brother Malvinder Mohan Singh. The two have many cases of fraud registered against them. He was granted bail in June 2023 by the Delhi High Court.

== Early life ==
Singh is the son of Dr. Pravinder Singh, and grandson of Bhai Mohan Singh, the founder of Ranbaxy Laboratories, since merged with Sun Pharmaceuticals Ltd (it was earlier a unit of the Japanese drug maker Daiichi Sankyo).

== Business career ==
Singh and his brother Malvinder Mohan Singh inherited their family's 33.5% stake in Ranbaxy after the death of their father in 1999. In April 2015, they were the thirty-fifth richest Indians, with a net worth of $2.5 billion.

== Education ==
Singh attended The Doon School, and then graduated with a BA (hons.) in mathematics from St. Stephen's College, Delhi; he holds an MBA with specialization in health sector management from the Fuqua School of Business of Duke University in the United States.

== Personal life ==
Singh lives in New Delhi with his wife Aditi S. Singh and their four sons. On 24 September, during the AGM of Fortis Hospitals, Singh announced his resignation and handed control of the hospital chain to his brother.

== Arrest ==
As of 1 November 2019, Singh, along with his brother, remained under arrest, as his judicial custody has been extended until 14 November 2019. On 12 December 2019, a Delhi court rejected his bail plea in a case related to alleged misappropriation of funds at Religare Finvest Limited. He was granted bail in June 2023 by the Delhi High Court.
