= Kevin Kelley =

Kevin Kelley may refer to:

- Kevin Kelley (American football) (born 1969), American high school and college football coach
- Kevin Kelley (boxer) (born 1967), American boxer
- Kevin Kelley (musician) (1943–2002), American drummer for the Rising Sons and The Byrds
- Kevin J. Kelley, President of Cleveland City Council

== See also ==
- Kevin Kelly (disambiguation)
