= Ron Nicol =

American businessman (born 1948)

Ron L. Nicol
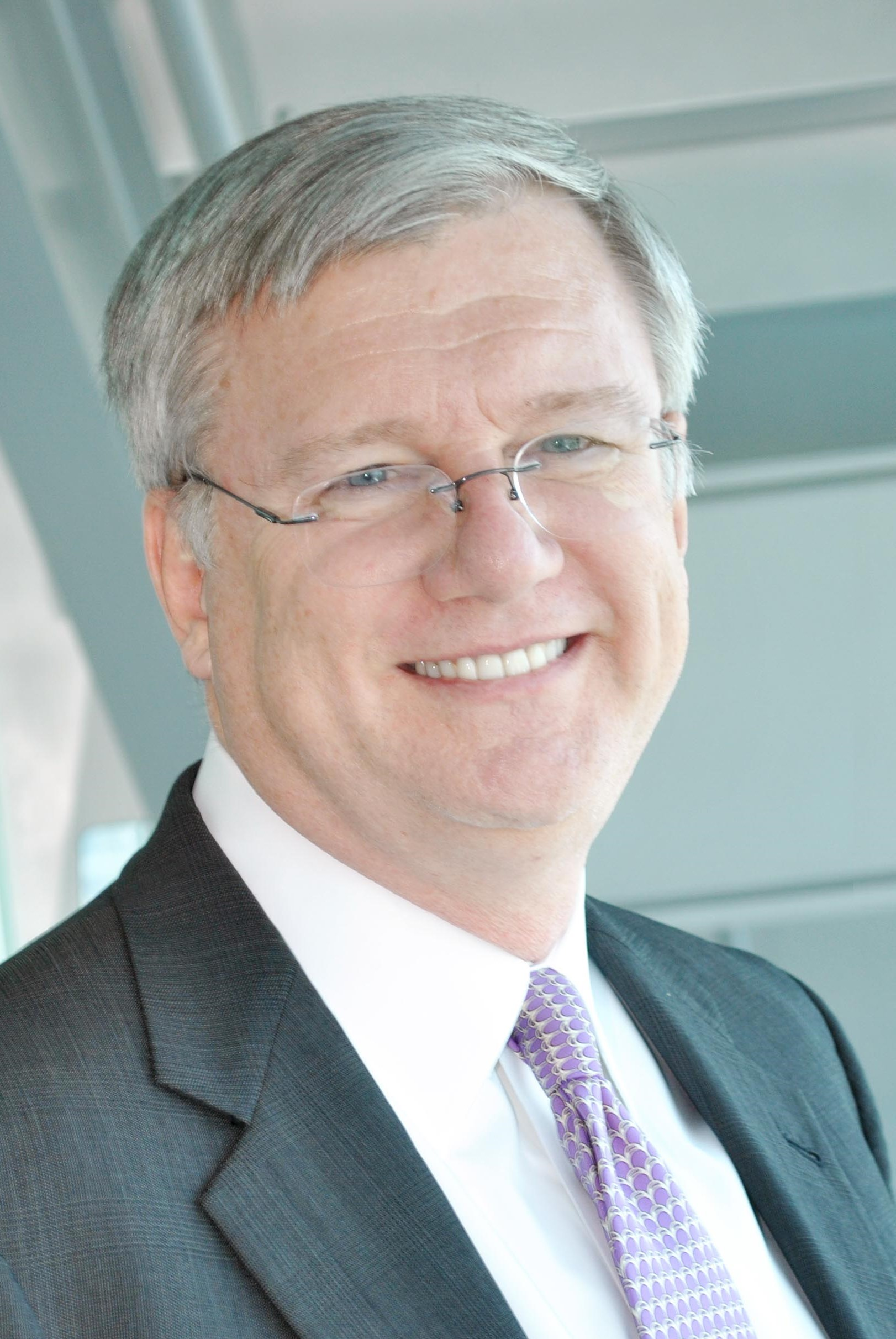
- Born: Ronald L. Nicol; June 30, 1953 (age 73); Frostburg, Maryland
- Education: United States Naval Academy; Fuqua School of Business, Duke University
- Occupation: Management consultant
- Employer(s): Babcock & Wilcox; Boston Consulting Group
- Spouse: Liane
- Children: 2
- Military Service – U.S. Submarine Naval Officer
- Branch: United States Navy
- Service years: 1975–1982 (Active Duty), 1982–1995 (Reserves)
- Rank: Lieutenant Commander
- Awards: Navy Achievement Medal awarded by Secretary of Navy; Commendation from Commander, Submarine Squadron Sixteen

Ronald L. Nicol (born June 30, 1953) is an American business executive, management consultant, and former submarine naval officer. Between 1987 and 2019, he was employed by Boston Consulting Group, most recently the global leader of the firms technology, media, and communications practice. In 2016, he was the director of the agency action team in President-elect Donald Trump's administration transition.

== Early life and education ==
Nicol grew up in Maryland and attended Beall High School in Frostburg, Maryland. He received his BS in physics from the United States Naval Academy. Nicol was on active duty for seven years, teaching nuclear engineering and serving aboard a ballistic missile submarine. He attended Duke University's Fuqua School of Business with financial assistance from his employer and the G.I. Bill, graduating with an MBA in 1986. He later served in the Naval Reserve and attained the rank of lieutenant commander.

== United States Naval Academy career and naval career ==
Nicol graduated from the United States Naval Academy in 1975 with honors. He ranked #7 in the class with a 3.88/4.00 (GPA) in physics. He was a recipient of the Congressional Medal of Honor Society Prize for outstanding academic work at the academy. After graduation, he conducted research in plasma physics at the United States Naval Research Laboratory.

Nicol was assigned to the USS Mariano G. Vallejo (SSBN-658) following nuclear power school. While on board he was qualified as officer of the deck (OOD), engineering officer of the watch (EOOW), engineering duty officer (EDO), and command duty officer. His final assignment was as main propulsion assistant (MPA) on the submarine. He successfully completed the Chief Engineers Exam and was so designated by Naval Reactors.

Nicol was detailed to the Nuclear Power School where he served as an instructor. Nicol departed active duty in 1982 and then remained in the Naval Reserves, assigned to COMSUBLANT. Nicol entered retired Reserve status in 1995.

Nicol was named a 2023 Distinguished Graduate of the United States Naval Academy. This award is given to 5 living alumni from the more than 50,000 living alumni on an annual basis.

== Career ==
Nicol's first civilian job was with Babcock & Wilcox, an energy company based in Lynchburg, Virginia, where he later was responsible for manufacturing in the Naval Nuclear Fuel Division.

=== Boston Consulting Group ===
Nicol joined the Boston Consulting Group, a management consulting firm, in 1987. He worked out of their Chicago office and was elected partner four years later. In 1993, he opened the firm's Dallas office. In 2006, Nicol was named one of the top 25 Global Consultants by Consulting Magazine. He served as a senior partner and managing director before becoming a senior advisor in January 2016. His areas of focus have been technology and organization. He is also a Special Advisor at Tritium Partners and Anzu Industrial Capital Partners.

=== Trump transition ===
In 2016, Nicol was selected to direct the agency action team in charge of President-elect Donald Trump's transition. The team was responsible for the successful turnover of all agencies of the federal government.

Subsequent to the Trump Transition, Nicol returned to the world of business by joining a number of corporate boards, becoming an advisor to private equity and venture capital firms and becoming a senior advisor at The Boston Consulting Group.

=== Board memberships ===
In November 2012, Nicol became the chairman, Board of Visitors Fuqua School of Business, Duke University. During his tenure Fuqua, was rated number one U.S. business school by Business Week. Nicol currently is Chairman Emeritus, Board of Visitors.

In March 2018, Nicol took a position on the board of Austin Industries, a United States-based diversified construction company.

From July 2019 through October 2020, Nicol was a board member for Top Aces US, who provide advanced airborne training to major air forces globally.

In March 2020, Nicol became a board member for the United States Naval Academy Foundation, a not for profit organization that supports the Naval Academy and its mission.

In March 2021, Nicol became a trustee for the United States Naval Academy Athletic and Scholarship Program.

NUBURU, an Industrial high power blue laser manufacturer, named Nicol the Executive Chairman in early December 2021. he will also sit on the board of the Centennial, Colorado based company.

== Personal life ==
Nicol is married to Liane S. Nicol. They have two daughters and five grandchildren. In 2012, the Nicols set up a $1 million charitable lead annuity trust (CLAT) to benefit their daughters and the Ronald L. and Liane S. Nicol Scholarship Endowment of Duke University's Fuqua School of Business.
