= Michael Lamach =

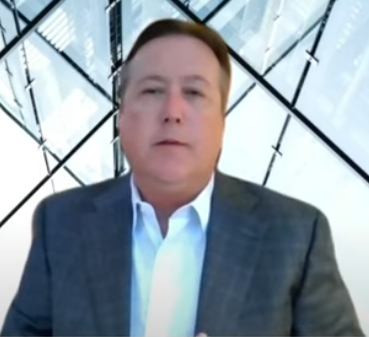
- Speaking at the 2021 World Economic Forum
- Occupation: Business executive

Michael W. Lamach is the former chairman and CEO of Trane Technologies.

== Early life and career ==
Lamach received a Bachelor in Engineering from Michigan State University and a Master in Business Administration from Duke University's Fuqua School of Business.

He grew up in Clinton Township, Michigan. He also has 2 sisters, one younger and one older. He is married and has 3 children.

Lamach joined Ingersoll Rand in 2004, became CEO and Chairman in 2010.

He received the Michigan State University's 2019 Alumni Grand Award.
