= David Gibbs (businessman) =

American business executive

David Gibbs is an American business executive, formerly known for serving as the chief executive officer of Yum! Brands Inc., and the holding company of KFC, Taco Bell, and Pizza Hut.

== Career ==
Gibbs became the chief executive officer of Yum! Brands Inc. on January 1, 2020. Prior to that appointment, he served as the company's president and chief operating officer beginning in January 2019, and earlier as president and chief financial officer. He joined the company's board of directors in November 2019. Gibbs resigned as CEO on October 1, 2025.

He previously held several leadership roles within the company's global restaurant divisions, including chief executive officer of Pizza Hut, president, and chief financial officer of Yum! Restaurants International, and chief strategy officer of Yum! Brands. Earlier in his career, he worked in real estate and restaurant development roles in KFC, Pizza Hut, and Taco Bell.

In 2021, Gibbs's total compensation from Yum! Brands was $27.6 million, reflecting a CEO-to-median worker pay ratio of 2,108-to-1. In 2023, his total compensation was reported as $21.2 million.

== Professional Distinction ==
In 2021, after he was appointed CEO of Yum! Brands Inc., he became a member of The Business Council.

== Education ==
Following his graduation from high school, Gibbs attended Johns Hopkins University, where he graduated with a B.S in mathematics. A year later, he entered graduate school and received an MBA in finance from the Fuqua School of Business at Duke University.
