= The Truth Pill =

2022 book by Dinesh Thakur and Prashant Reddy

The Truth Pill: The Myth of Drug Regulation in India
- Authors: Dinesh Singh Thakur; Prashant Reddy Thikkavarapu
- Language: English
- Subjects: Bioethics; Drug policy; Health law
- Genre: Nonfiction
- Publisher: Simon & Schuster India
- Publication date: 10 October 2022
- Publication place: India
- Media type: Print (hardback), Digital
- Pages: 508
- ISBN: 9789392099175
- Website: thetruthpill.in

The Truth Pill: The Myth of Drug Regulation in India is a 2022 book by whistleblower Dinesh Thakur and lawyer Prashant Reddy. The book highlights the problems in India's drug regulatory framework, and the government oversight relating to poor manufacturing practices and clinical trials of drugs by Indian pharmaceutical companies.

The authors advocate for greater transparency and reforms in India's drug regulation and enforcement system.

== Context ==
In 2007, the U.S. Food and Drug Administration, had begun criminal investigation of Ranbaxy Laboratories after whistleblowers including Dinesh Thakur informed the FDA of serious quality-related issues at the company. By 25 February 2009, the FDA said it had halted reviews of all drug applications from India because of a practice of falsification of data and test results in approved and pending drug applications. In May 2013, Ranbaxy pleaded guilty and paid US$500 million in fines for felony charges relating to the manufacture and distribution of adulterated drugs and misrepresenting clinical generic drug data.

== Summary ==
The book details and analyses several incidents of deaths having occurred due to malpractices by Indian pharmaceutical companies, and the judicial laxity in such cases. One of these incidents details the death of 12 children in Jammu and Kashmir due to consumption of a cough syrup containing diethylene glycol.

The book also critiques the practice of Ayurveda in India. Authors argue that Ayurvedic cures, unlike modern medicine, can be administered in India without the prescription of a qualified doctor and Ayurvedic medicines are known to contain harmful heavy metals. They also raise concern that the regulatory framework for Ayurvedic and other traditional medicine contains no requirement to prove its safety and efficacy.

== Aftermath ==
Reddy and Thakur received legal notice from Central Drugs Standard Control Organisation (CDSCO) after commenting on the deaths of more than 66 children in Gambia caused by Indian-made cough syrups. The deaths had occurred after the release of their book. CDSCO accused the authors of trying to malign the image of the institution and of the nation.

== See also ==
- Drugs and Cosmetics Act, 1940
- Pharmaceutical fraud
- Pharmaceutical industry in India
- Lists of pharmaceutical industry topics
