= Jonathan Browning (UK businessman) =

British businessman (born 1959)

- Born: 21 June 1959 (age 67); Taunton, England
- Education: University of Nottingham; Duke University's Fuqua School of Business

Jonathan Browning (born 21 June 1959) was the president and CEO of Volkswagen Group of America. He stepped down in December 2013 stating personal reasons.

== Career ==
He was General Motors Europe Vice President, Sales, Marketing and Aftersales and the chairman of Vauxhall Motors. He served as the chairman of Vauxhall Motors Ltd. from May 2005 until 2008. He previously worked for Ford, where he was the Managing Director of Jaguar Cars between 1999 and 2001. On 4 June 2010 Volkswagen Group announced that Jonathan Browning assumed responsibility for the global directing of the Volkswagen Group’s National Sales Companies (NSC) with effect from 1 June 2010. He became the president and CEO of Volkswagen Group of America on 1 October 2010 and resigned on 12 December 2013. He is currently Chairman of the Coventry and Warwickshire Local Enterprise Partnership.

== Early life ==
Browning was born in Taunton, England. He obtained a BS from the University of Nottingham and an MBA from Duke University's Fuqua School of Business
