= Metropolis Healthcare =

Indian multinational diagnostic lab company

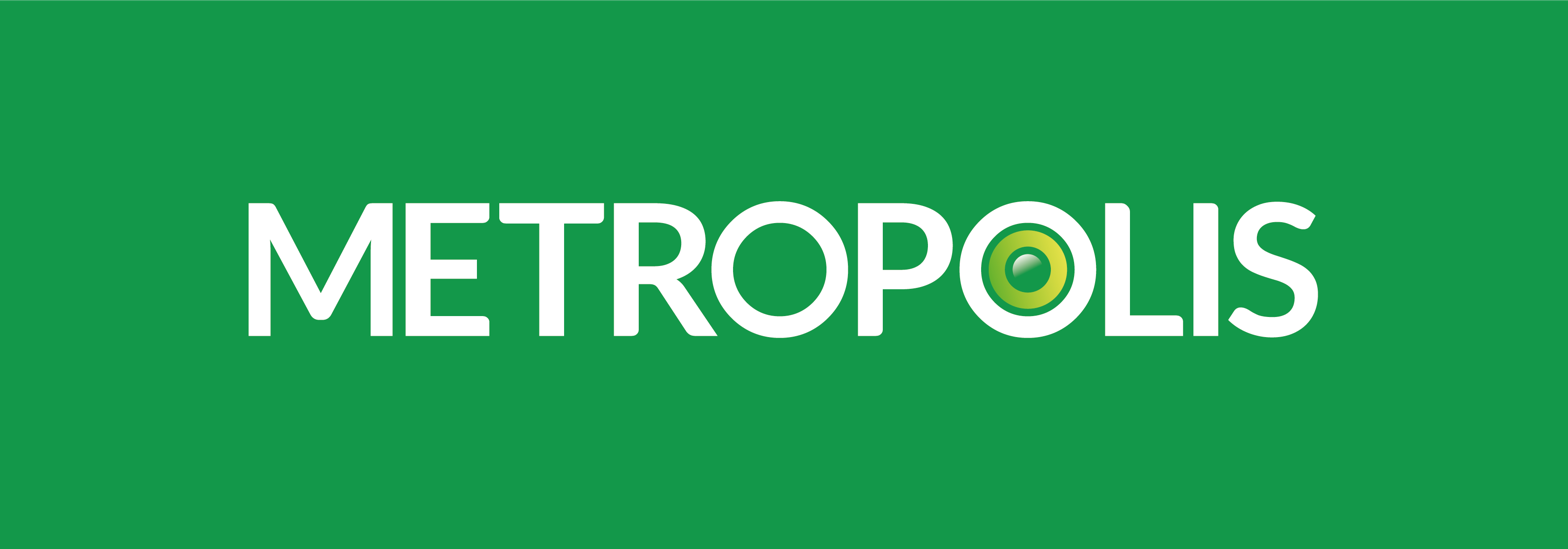
- Type: Public
- Traded as: NSE: METROPOLIS; BSE: 542650
- ISIN: INE112L01020
- Industry: Health and Medical Services
- Founded: 1980
- Founder: Dr. Sushil Kanubhai Shah
- Headquarters: Mumbai, Maharashtra, India
- Number of locations: 124 clinical laboratories across 7 countries
- Area served: India; Sri Lanka; Uganda; Zambia; Kenya; Mauritius; Ghana
- Key people: Dr. Sushil Kanubhai Shah (Chairman); Ameera Shah (Managing Director); Surendran Chemmenkotil (CEO)
- Services: Health care management
- Revenue: ▲₹1,228 crore (US$130 million) (FY22)
- Net income: ▲₹214 crore (US$22 million) (FY22)
- Number of employees: 4600+ (2021)
- Website: www.metropolisindia.com

Metropolis Healthcare, also known as Metropolis Labs, is an Indian multinational chain of diagnostic labs, with its central laboratory in Mumbai, Maharashtra. Metropolis Healthcare has a chain of 124 clinical laboratories and 2400 collection centers across 7 countries including India. The healthcare company was founded in 1980. The company went public in April 2019.

== History ==
Metropolis was founded by Dr. Sushil Kanubhai Shah in 1980. The healthcare company was started as a single diagnostic laboratory in Mumbai. Shah's daughter, Ameera Shah, took over the pathology business in 2001. The company started out by partnering with local and regional diagnostic chains, thereby spreading its reach across the country. Metropolis Healthcare has expanded into new service areas, like Clinical Research, Hospital Lab Management and Wellness Solutions, in the past decade. Metropolis Healthcare began its international expansion in 2005 with Sri Lanka being the first market. It further expanded to UAE in 2006, followed by Kenya in 2013 and Mauritius and Ghana in 2014.

In February 2018, Metropolis partnered with National Aids Control Organisation (NACO) for a three-year project for diagnosis of HIV at 560 locations in India. As of 2018, the diagnostic chain consists of 124 clinical laboratories and 2400 blood collection centers across India, Ghana, Kenya, Zambia, Uganda, Mauritius and Sri Lanka.

In October 2019, Metropolis Healthcare acquired four individual laboratories, Doctor's Clinical Laboratory, Iyer Pathology Laboratory, Nagar Pathology Laboratory and Yash Clinical Laboratory, a subsidiary of Dr Lal PathLabs in Surat, Gujarat, for INR 18 crore. The acquisition was done in order to expand the penetration of Metropolis's wholly owned subsidiary Desai Laboratories.

In October 2021, Metropolis completed the acquisition of South Indian diagnostic chain Hitech Diagnostic Centre and its subsidiary Centralab Healthcare Services for ₹636 crore.

== Funding ==
ICICI Venture invested 35 crore in Metropolis in the year 2006 through its India Advantage Fund. In 2010, Warburg Pincus invested about $85 Million in Metropolis, paving a way for ICICI to exit. The Shah family purchased the exiting stake from Warburg Pincus for a healthy return on investment. The company is backed by several investors including Carlyle Group, CA Lotus Investments and Kohlberg Kravis Roberts (KKR). In 2015, KKR backed Ameera Shah through ₹5.6 billion (equivalent to ₹8.5 billion or US$88 million in 2023) promoter debt funding.

In April 2019, the company raised Rs 530 crore from 26 anchor investors, including Small Cap World Fund, Neuberger Berman Emerging Market Equity Fund, Fundsmith Emerging Equities Trust PLC and First State Indian Sub Continent Fund, among others.

== Awards and recognition ==
Metropolis was awarded the Diagnostic Services Company of the Year by Frost & Sullivan in 2010. In 2014, it was awarded India's Most Promising Brand by the World Consulting and Research Corporation, which was evaluated by Ernst & Young. In 2018 and 2017, MD of Metropolis, Ameera Shah was ranked 36th and 46th respectively, in "India's Most Powerful Women in Business" by Fortune India Magazine. in 2015, Shah was awarded as one of the Asia's Power Business Women by Forbes.

== Philanthropy ==
In April 2017, Metropolis launched a scholarship and mentorship program, called "Medengage", for undergraduate and postgraduate medical students across India. In July 2017, Metropolis and the PCOS Society of India launched a Polycystic Ovarian Syndrome (PCOS) awareness campaign called "Conquer PCOS". In August 2018, Metropolis initiated an "Umbrella Handshake" campaign to create awareness about health. The company donated ₹2 million (equivalent to ₹2.7 million or US$28,000 in 2023) towards this and other social welfare initiatives. Metropolis partnered with We Foundation and Red FM, to help in public outreach and campaign awareness.

== See also ==
- Dr Lal PathLabs
- SRL Diagnostics
- Thyrocare
