= Kevin Kelly (rugby league) =

Australian rugby league footballer

Personal information
- Full name: Kevin Condon Kelly
- Born: 2 December 1960 (age 64); Sydney, New South Wales, Australia

Playing information
- Position: Halfback
Club
Years	Team	Pld	T	G	FG	P
1981–82	St. George Dragons	13	4	1	1	15
1984–86	Illawarra Steelers	40	10	1	0	42
	Total	53	14	2	1	57
- Source: As of 6 February 2023

Kevin Kelly nicknamed 'Two K's' is an Australian former professional rugby league footballer who played in the 1980s. He played for Illawarra and St. George in the New South Wales Rugby League (NSWRL) competition.

== Playing career ==
Kelly made his first grade debut for St. George in round 5 of the 1981 NSWRFL season against Penrith at Kogarah Oval. Kelly started at five-eighth in the clubs 23–15 victory. Kelly played 13 games for the Red V over two years.

In 1984, Kelly joined Illawarra and was the clubs first choice halfback over two seasons. Kelly's final game for the club was in round 12 of the 1986 NSWRL season against Eastern Suburbs at the Wollongong Showground.
