= Malvinder Mohan Singh =

Indian businessman

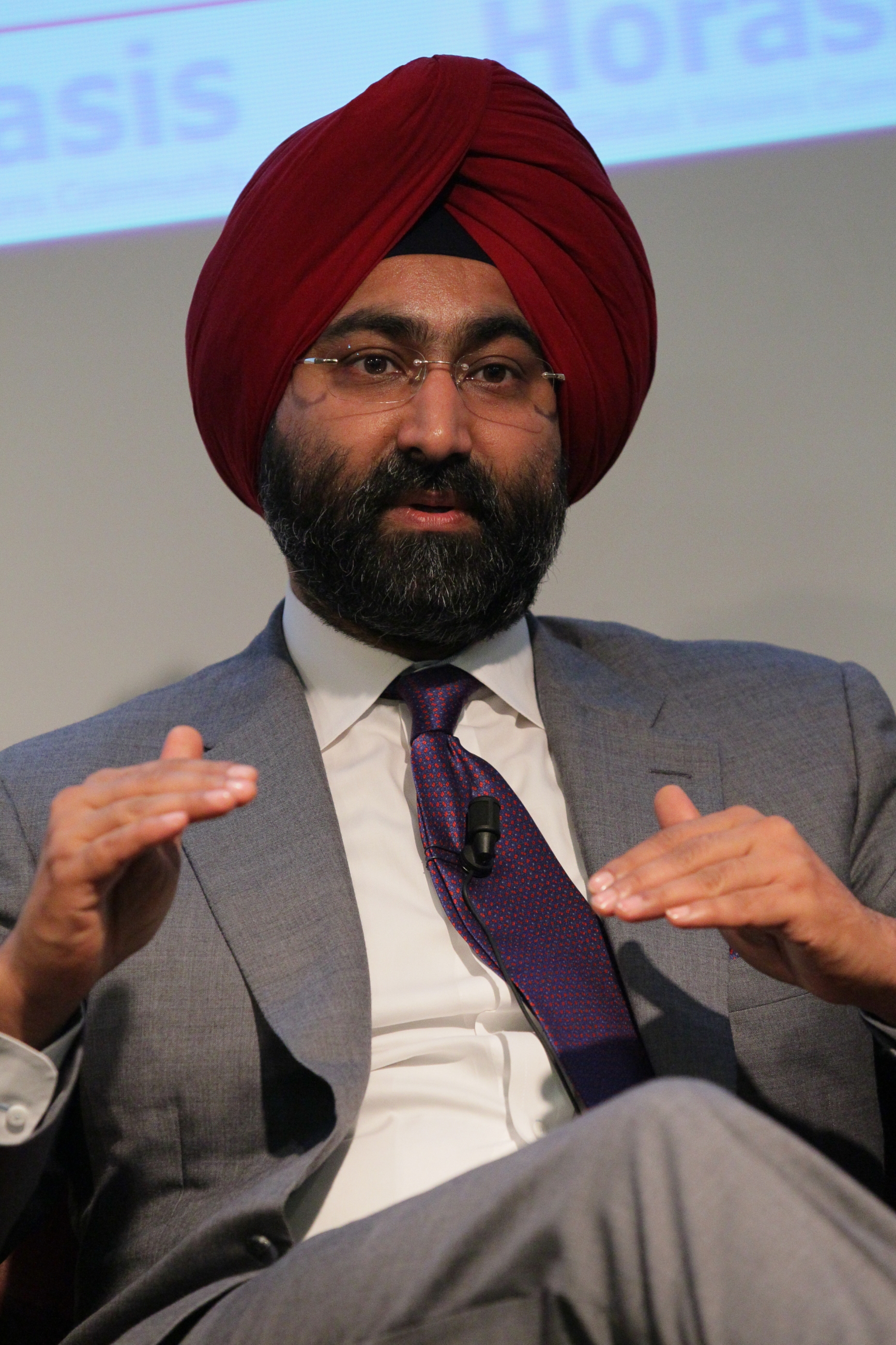
- Malvinder Mohan Singh
- Education: Duke University (MBA)
- Occupation: Businessman
- Known for: Chairman and CEO of Ranbaxy Laboratories
- Relatives: Shivinder Mohan Singh (brother); Bhai Mohan Singh (grandfather)

Malvinder Mohan Singh is an Indian businessman. He was formerly the CEO of the now-defunct pharmaceutical firm Ranbaxy Laboratories. Along with his brother, Shivinder Mohan Singh, he has been charged in numerous cases of fraud related to his handling of the company.

As the head of Ranbaxy, Singh oversaw both a massively fraudulent operation aimed at deceiving the U.S. Food and Drug Administration (FDA) and other international health organisations as to the quality of the company's generic drug products, as well as the deception of the company's buyers when he mediated its sale to the Japanese drugmaker Daiichi Sankyo, in 2008. Singh, who had been kept on as CEO by the purchasing company, resigned in 2009, as the deceit became apparent and as Ranbaxy began posting losses due to FDA-imposed restrictions on its products.

In an unrelated incident, Singh was arrested in the early hours of 11 October 2019 near Ludhiana, pursuant to a further fraud case against him and his brother, who was also placed under arrest.

== Early life and education ==
Malvinder Mohan Singh is the grandson of Bhai Mohan Singh, who bought Ranbaxy Laboratories from its original founders in 1952.

Singh and his brother, Shivinder, attended the Doon School in Dehradun and later St. Stephen's College in Delhi. He went on to study at Duke University's Fuqua School of Business in Durham, North Carolina, where he earned his MBA.

== Career ==
Singh and his brother inherited their father's 33.5% stake in Ranbaxy upon his death in 1999, which placed them among the richest individuals in India. During his time with the company, Singh held the position of president of pharmaceuticals and eventually became CEO and managing director, in 2006. His tenure as head of the firm coincided with a period of intense, whistleblower-driven fraud investigations by the FDA, other world health organisations, as well as the U.S. Department of Justice (DOJ). In 2006, the FDA restricted abbreviated new drug applications from specific Ranbaxy plants. In November, Singh led a failed delegation to FDA headquarters to try to reverse this decision. In 2008, Singh orchestrated the fraudulent sale of Ranbaxy to the Japanese pharmaceutical Daiichi Sankyo for U.S.$2-billion, which included the 33.5% stake owned by him and his brother. This was followed by further events implicating Singh in illegal activity while at the Ranbaxy helm, including a fraud prosecution of the company by the DOJ that resulted in a corporate guilty plea and a U.S.$500,000,000 fine in May 2013; Daiichi Sankyo launched a legal case against the Singhs at the International Court of Arbitration in Singapore, which directed the brothers in April 2016 to pay U.S.$550,000,000 to the Japanese company. The corporate culture of deceit prevalent at Ranbaxy prior and during Singh's leadership, along with its subsequent illicit activities and fraudulent sale, ultimately resulted in fines to the company and to the Singhs in excess of U.S.$1 billion.

== Arrest ==
In October 2019, a separate company owned by the Singh brothers, Religare Finvest, reported perceived crimes to the Delhi police Economic Offences Wing, alleging embezzlement; the brothers were subsequently arrested. Both brothers have denied the charges.

As of 9 February 2021, both Singh brothers remained under arrest.
