= Ameera Shah =

Indian entrepreneur

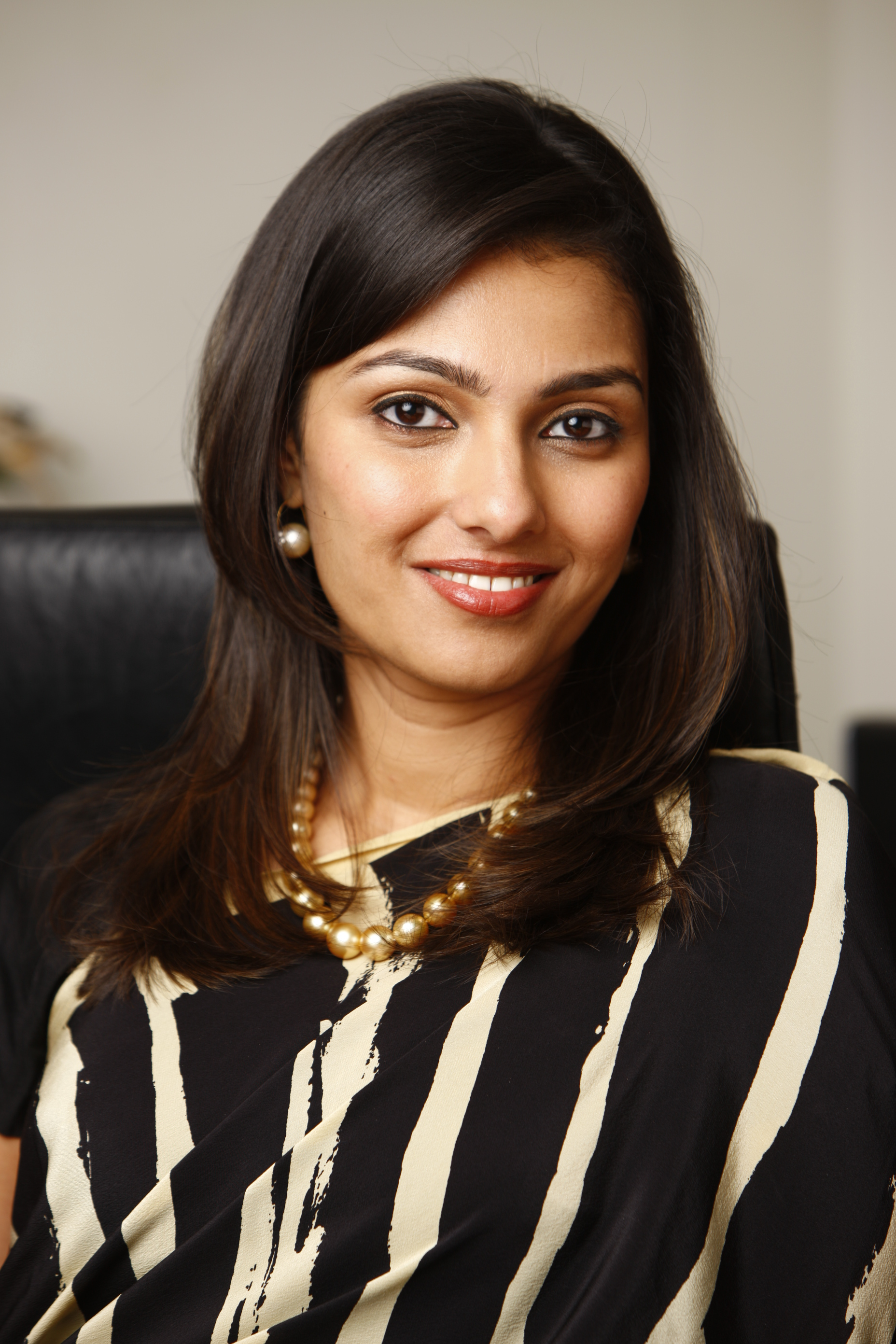
- Born: 24 September 1979 (age 46); Mumbai, Maharashtra, India
- Education: University of Texas at Austin
- Occupations: Executive Chairperson and Whole-time Director, Metropolis Healthcare
- Website: Website of Metropolis Healthcare

Ameera Shah (born 24 September 1979) is an Indian entrepreneur. She is Executive Chairperson and Whole-time Director of Metropolis Healthcare, a leading diagnostic chain with presence in India and Africa. She is the daughter of Dr Sushil Shah, the founder of Metropolis Healthcare.

She has been honored as a 2015 Young Global Leader by the World Economic Forum. She was named to Fortune India's "Most Powerful Women in Business" list in 2017, 2018, 2019, 2020, and 2021. Shah was featured in the list of Forbes India's Tycoons of Tomorrow 2018. She also received the Ernst & Young ‘Entrepreneur of the Year’ Award in healthcare for 2021.

Currently, she serves as Sr. Vice-President of NATHealth (Healthcare Federation of India). She is also an Independent Director on the boards of Torrent Pharma and the ACC limited, which is a part of Adani Group. She was also an advisor to Baylor College of Medicine and the global advisory board of AXA.

== Early life ==
She studied commerce at junior college in H.R. College of Commerce and Economics. She obtained a degree in finance from the University of Texas at Austin.

She used to work with Goldman Sachs in New York. Later, she completed the Owner-President Management Program at Harvard Business School. Shah is an industry spokesperson and has been featured as a speaker in various National and International forums, industry events and conclaves. She has spoken at events organized by Indian Institute of Management Ahmedabad, Harvard Business School, TED, and CII.

== Career ==
=== Metropolis Healthcare ===
She took over her father's pathology business- Metropolis Lab in 2001. She subsequently transformed a single diagnostic lab which had a revenue of about $1.5 million and 40 employees, to Metropolis Healthcare, a multinational chain of 125 diagnostic labs with $90 million in revenue and 4,500 employees. She successfully led the listing of the company in April 2019.

=== Board memberships and affiliations ===
She serves as a Board Member of Marico Kaya Enterprises Limited and the Managing Director of Metropolis Healthcare Limited. She is presently the Independent Director at Torrent Pharmaceuticals Limited., Shoppers Stop Limited and Kaya Limited She is an advisor to Baylor College of Medicine. She is also on the global advisory board of AXA.

Shah has also served as secretary of the Indian Association of Pathology Laboratories (IAPL) and co-chairperson of Federation of Indian Chambers of Commerce and Industry (FICCI) Health Services Committee in 2012.

=== Other ventures ===
Between 2016 and 2017, she starred in and was an investor on the startup reality television show The Vault.

In 2017, Shah founded Empoweress, a not-for-profit initiative for women-led businesses to find advice, mentorship and micro-funding.

== Honours and awards ==
- CNBC-AWAAZ CEO Awards 2019
- Business Today's Most Powerful Women list, 2018, 2019
- Tycoons of Tomorrow by Forbes India, 2018
- India's Most Powerful Women in Business (ranked at no. 28) by Fortune India Magazine, 2019
- India's Most Powerful Women in Business (ranked at no. 36) by Fortune India Magazine, 2018
- India's Most Powerful Women in Business (ranked at no. 46) by Fortune India Magazine, 2017
- Asia's Power Business Women 2015, Forbes
- Young Global Leader, World Economic Forum, 2015
- Women Leadership Award at the CMO Asia Awards, 2015
- Exemplary Women Leadership Award, World Women Leadership Congress & Awards, 2014
- 40 Under 40 Business Leaders by The Economic Times
- Young Achiever of the Year, CMO Asia Awards, 2011
- Young Entrepreneur of the Year Award, 2011 by Entrepreneur India & Bloomberg

== Personal life ==
Ameera Shah was born to Dr. Sushil Shah, a pathologist, and Dr. Duru Shah, a gynaecologist. Her elder sister Aparna Rajadhyaksha is a geneticist. Ameera is married to Hemant Sachdev, an Indian retail entrepreneur, who serves as a non-executive director of Metropolis Healthcare. In March 2020, she gave birth to a baby boy named Karma. In April 2025, she gave birth to twins (boy and girl) with the names of Jahaan and Nandi.
