= Fuqua School of Business =

Business school of Duke University in Durham, North Carolina, US

Coordinates: 35.9992°N 78.9471°W

Duke University Fuqua School of Business
- Type: Private business school
- Established: 1969
- Parent institution: Duke University
- Endowment: $267 million (2015)
- Dean: Mary Frances Luce
- Postgraduates: 861 full time MBA; 503 executive MBA; 130 MMS:FOB
- Doctoral students: 78
- Location: Durham, North Carolina, United States
- Website: fuqua.duke.edu

The Duke University Fuqua School of Business (pronounced /ˈfjuːkwə/) is the business school of Duke University, a private research university in Durham, North Carolina. It enrolls more than 1,800 students in degree-seeking programs. Duke Executive Education also offers non-degree business education and professional development programs.

== History ==
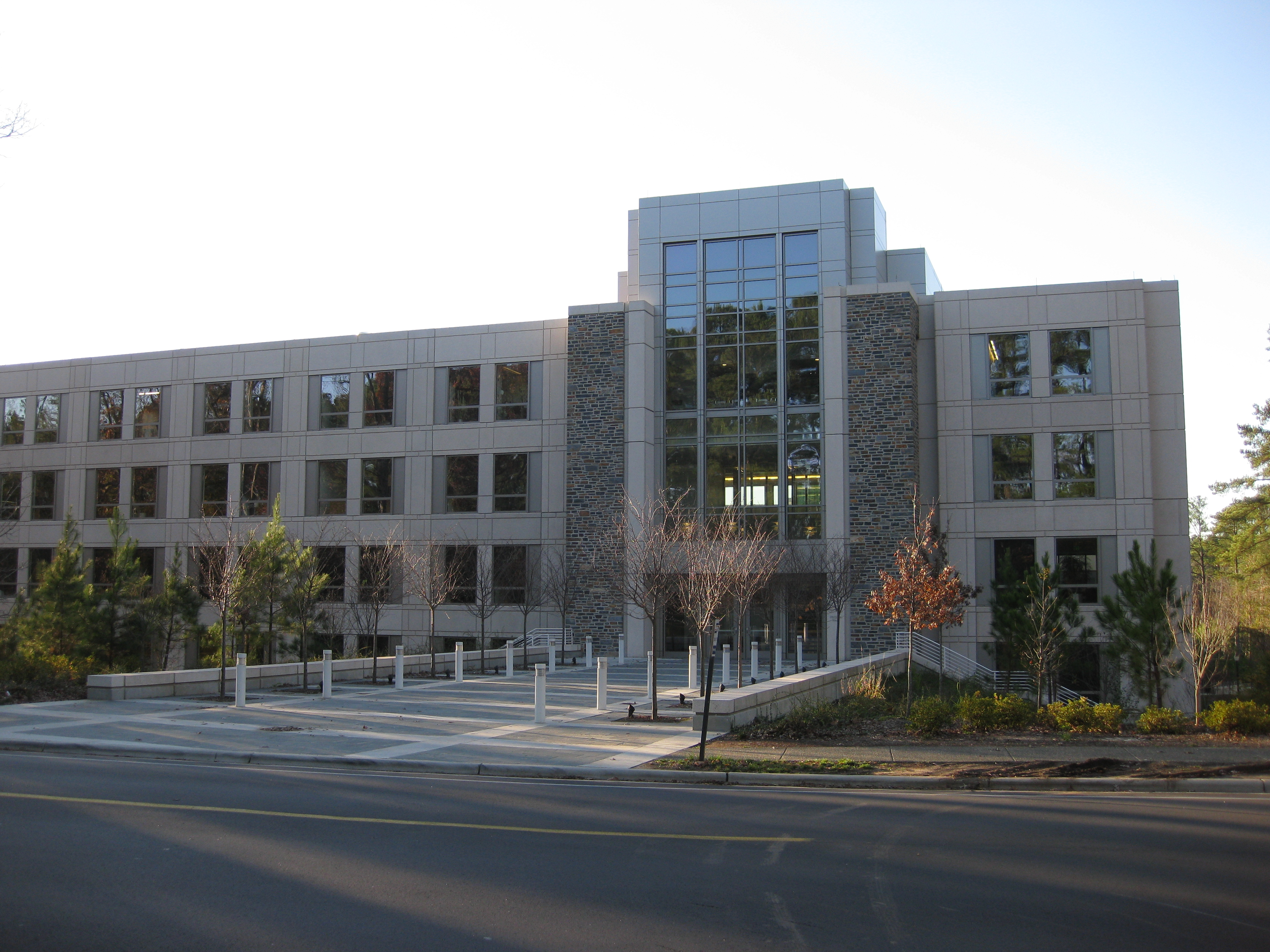
Breeden Hall, The Fuqua School of Business

Formed in 1969, the Graduate School of Business Administration enrolled its first class of 20 students in 1970. In 1974, Thomas F. Keller, a 1953 Duke graduate, became the graduate school's new dean. In three years, Keller's capital campaign raised $24 million, $10 million of which came from businessman and philanthropist J. B. Fuqua. The graduate school's name was then changed to the Fuqua School of Business.

J. B. Fuqua was raised by his grandparents on a tobacco farm in Prince Edward County, Virginia. Fuqua began his relationship with Duke University when he borrowed books by mail from the Duke library. J. B. Fuqua's cumulative giving to Duke was nearly $40 million at the time of his death on April 5, 2006.

== Admissions ==
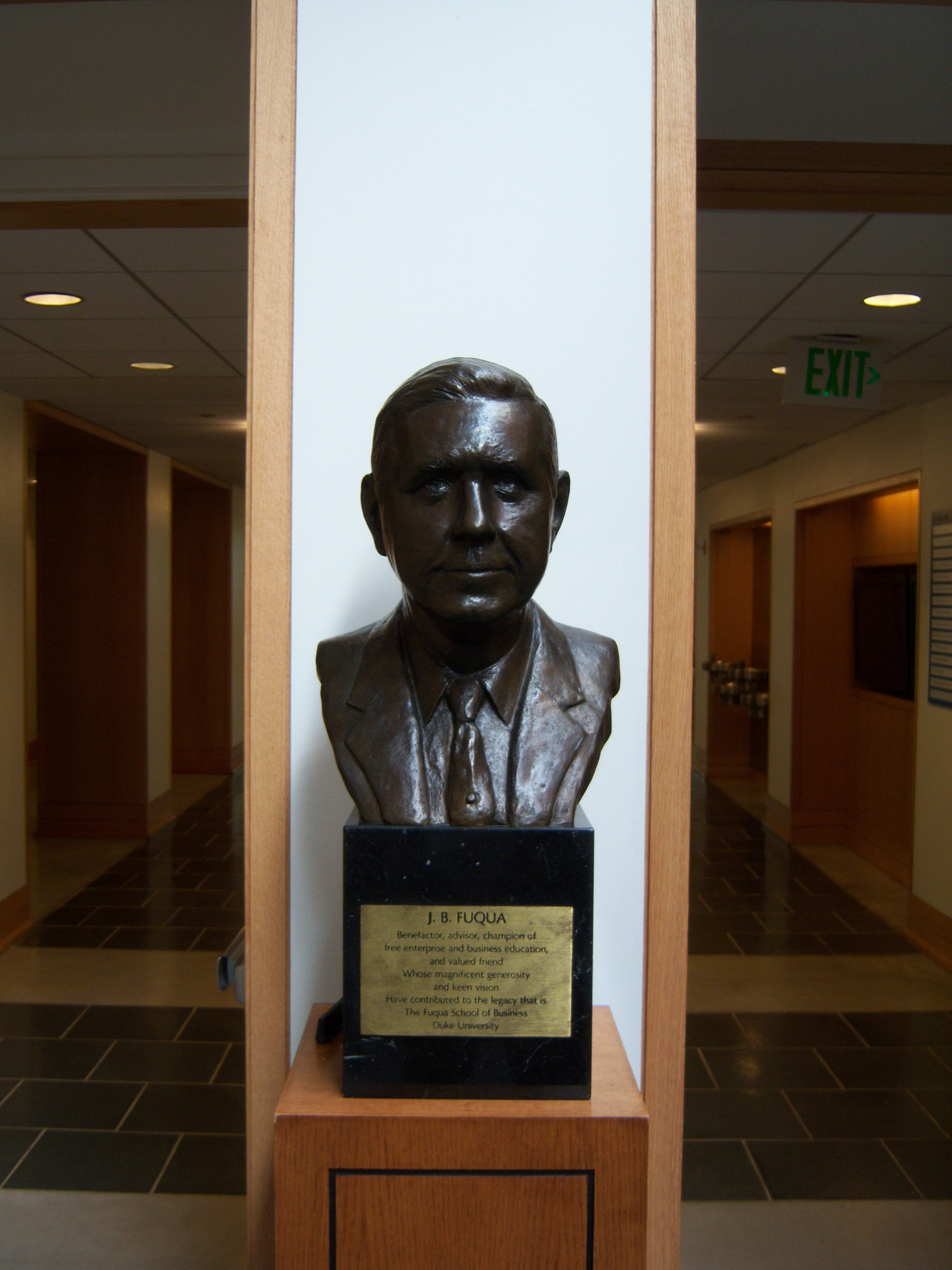
A bust of J. B. Fuqua in the Hall of Flags at the Fuqua School of Business

For the Daytime MBA Class of 2027, Fuqua had a 24.0% acceptance rate with 4,032 applications received. Approximately 44% of those accepted into the MBA program enrolled to fill a class of 426. The median GMAT score was 720. Fuqua reports an 80% GMAT range of 680–770, with 35% international and 47% female students.

== Academics ==
The school's faculty is organized into ten disciplines, including Accounting, Marketing, Decision Sciences, Economics, Finance, Management, Health Sector Management, Management Communication, Operations Management, and Strategy.

While working at Duke University, former Professor Robert E. Whaley developed the Chicago Board Options Exchange Volatility Index (ticker symbol: VIX), a measure of the implied market volatility. Another notable faculty member is Dan Ariely, an Israeli-American professor of psychology and behavioral economics.

=== Dual degrees ===
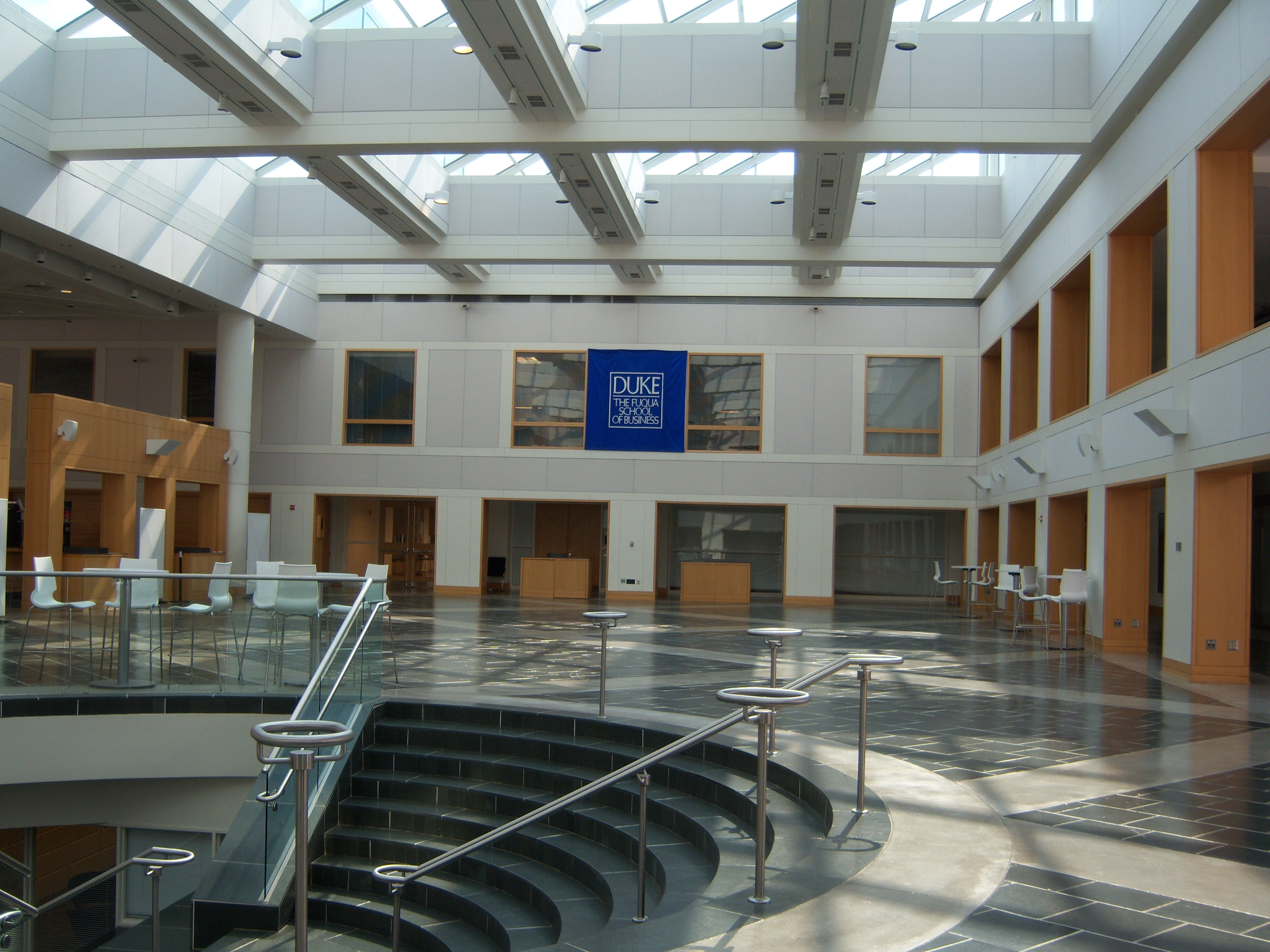
Fox Student Center

The Duke MBA offers several dual degree programs in conjunction with other graduate and professional programs at Duke. These programs allow students to earn two degrees in less time than if they pursued the two separately. Dual degrees are offered with Duke University School of Medicine, Duke University School of Law, Nicholas School of the Environment and Earth Sciences, Sanford School of Public Policy, and the Duke University School of Nursing.

=== Rankings ===
In 2025, U.S. News & World Report ranked Duke University Fuqua School of Business as a tie for #13 out of 133 in Best Business Schools and ranked the school in Business School Specialty Rankings as #12 in Business Analytics, #5 in Executive MBA, #9 in Management, #5 in Marketing, and #6 in Nonprofit.

Fuqua School of Business was ranked #15 out of 100 in the Poets & Quants 2025-2026 MBA Programs rankings.

== Careers ==
Poets&Quants 2024 ranking of MBA compensation indicated that Fuqua ranked 10th in the US for average starting pay (salary and bonus) at a total of $193,557. Additionally, Fuqua's MBA program ranked 8th in the US for the percentage of students who had jobs 3 months after graduating.

In 2018-2019, the top five hiring companies for full time graduates and first-year interns include: McKinsey & Co. (45), Amazon (38), BCG (37), Microsoft (23), Dell (18), and Google (18).

== Research centers ==
Business school rankings

United States
- QS MBA: 13
- Financial Times MBA: 7
- Bloomberg MBA: 18
- USNWR MBA: 14
- THE Business: 12

Global
- QS MBA: 25
- Financial Times MBA: 16
- THE Business: 19

Research centers at the Fuqua School of Business further specific academic interests of the business school. Such research centers include:

- The Fuqua/Coach K Center of Leadership & Ethics (COLE) is a collaboration between Fuqua, Duke Athletics, and The Kenan Institute for Ethics to advance leadership through research and education.
- The Center for the Advancement of Social Entrepreneurship (CASE) encourages entrepreneurial approaches to improving social conditions through education and research.
- The Center of Entrepreneurship and Innovation (CEI) seeks to strengthen scholarship in the areas of entrepreneurship and innovation.
- The Center for Energy, Development and the Global Environment (EDGE) pursues education, research, and outreach focusing on Global Energy and Corporate Sustainability.
- The Center of Health Sector Management aims to improve healthcare services.

== Buildings ==
Fuqua School of Business spans several buildings. They include:

- Thomas F. Keller Center has several classrooms and support offices and was named for former Dean Thomas F. Keller.
- Wesley Alexander Magat Academic Center was built in 1999. The majority of faculty offices and smaller meeting rooms are located here.
- Lafe P. and Rita D. Fox Student Center has a student lounge, dining facilities, student communications center, and additional office space.
- Breeden Hall was named in honor of Dean Douglas Breeden and his wife Josie. It was built in 2008 and holds classrooms and auditoriums, the Ford Library, team rooms, meeting space, and MBA admissions and operations offices.
- JB Duke Hotel opened in 2017 and includes the R. David Thomas Executive Conference Center, and guest rooms and suites.

== Notable alumni ==
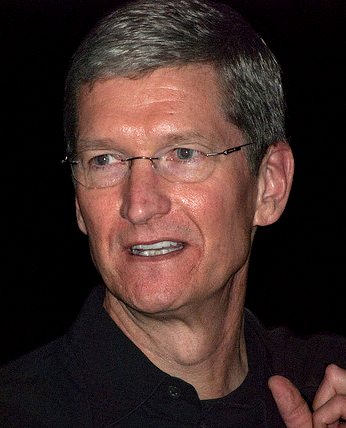
Tim Cook, CEO, Apple Inc.

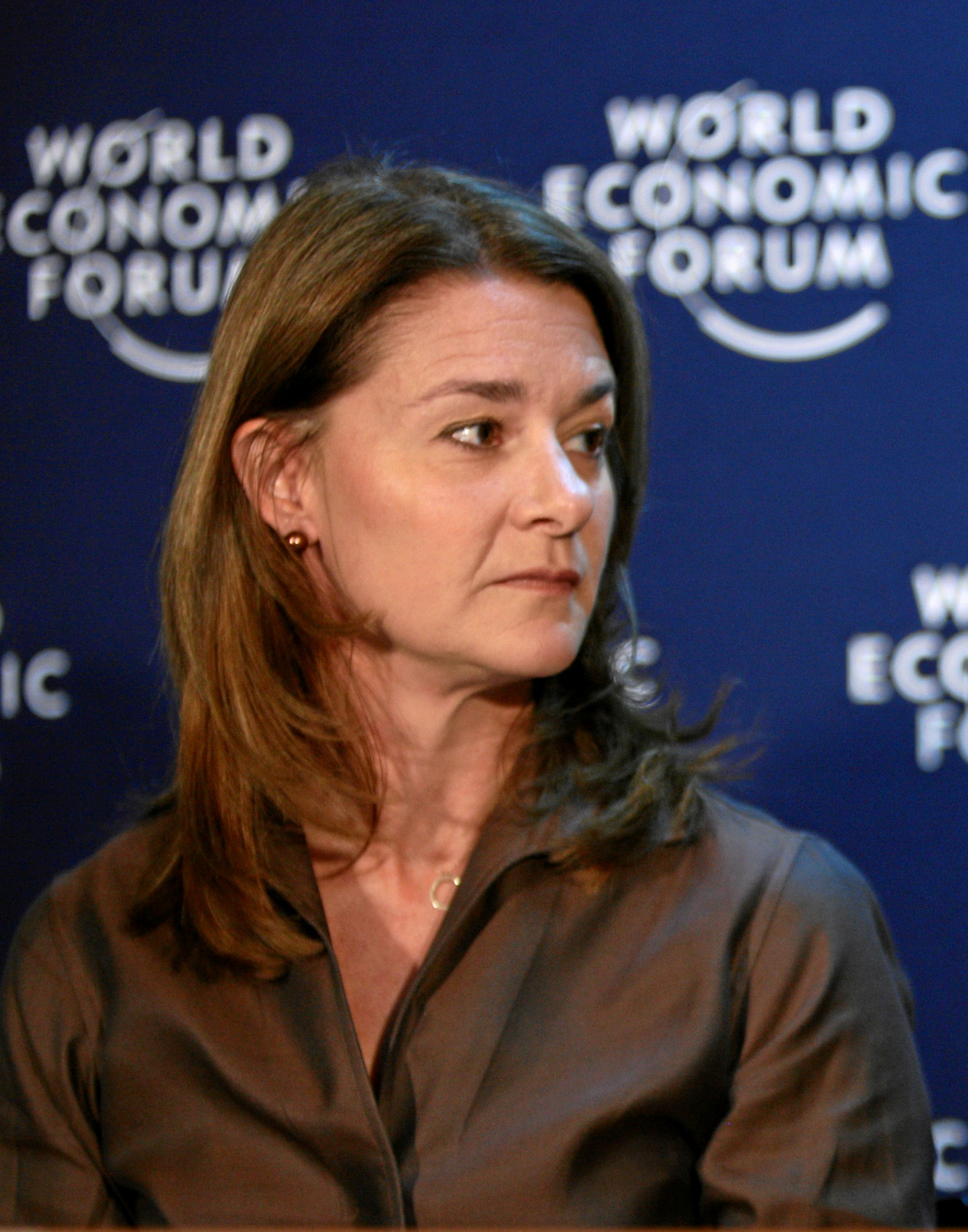
Melinda Gates, Co-Founder of the Gates Foundation

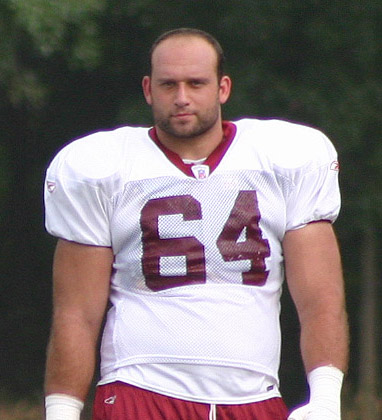
Lennie Friedman, NFL player

- John A. Allison IV (M.B.A. 1974), head of the Cato Institute; former chairman and CEO, BB&T
- Jack O. Bovender Jr. (M.H.A. 1969), former chairman and CEO, HCA
- Jonathan Browning (Global Executive M.B.A. 1997) former U.S. CEO, Volkswagen Group of America
- Jessica Faye Carter (J.D. 2002, M.B.A. 2002), author, columnist, social media entrepreneur
- Tim Cook (M.B.A. 1988), CEO, Apple Inc.
- Eddy Cue (Computer Science and Economics), Senior Vice President of Services, Apple Inc.
- Joe Euteneuer, CFO of Sprint Nextel
- Lennie Friedman (M.B.A. 2011), NFL offensive lineman
- Melinda Gates (A.B. 1986, M.B.A. 1987), co-founder, Gates Foundation
- Pat Garrity, (M.B.A. 2011), former NBA basketball player; assistant general manager, Detroit Pistons
- David Gibbs, (M.B.A. 1988), CEO, Yum! Brands
- Brian Hamilton (M.B.A. 1990), co-founder and former chairman, Sageworks; founder Inmates to Entrepreneurs
- W. Bruce Johnson (B.A., J.D., M.B.A. 1977), former interim CEO and president, Sears Holdings Corporation
- L. Kevin Kelly (Executive M.B.A. 1999), CEO of Heidrick & Struggles
- Michael Lamach (MS, Global Executive M.B.A. 2001), president, chairman, and CEO, Ingersoll Rand
- Alison Levine (M.B.A. 2000), Mount Everest climber, author (On the Edge); documentary executive producer (The Glass Ceiling)
- Ron Nicol (M.B.A. 1986), Senior Partner and Managing Director, Boston Consulting Group
- Hilda Pinnix-Ragland (M.B.A. 1986), Chairwoman of the Board of Trustees at North Carolina A&T State University
- Mark Reuss (M.B.A. 1990), President of General Motors
- Ahmad Sharaf, chairman of the Dubai Mercantile Exchange
- Namita Thapar (M.B.A. 2001), Shark Tank India Judge and Executive Director, Emcure Pharmaceuticals
- Christian Van Thillo (M.B.A. 1989), CEO, De Persgroep
- Brett Velicovich, (M.B.A. 2012), Fox News contributor and former United States Army intelligence.
- Jeff Williams (Apple), (M.B.A. 1998), COO, Apple Inc.
- Lynn Perry Wooten, (M.B.A. 1990), 9th President of Simmons University

== See also ==
- List of United States business school rankings
- List of business schools in the United States
