= L. Kevin Kelly =

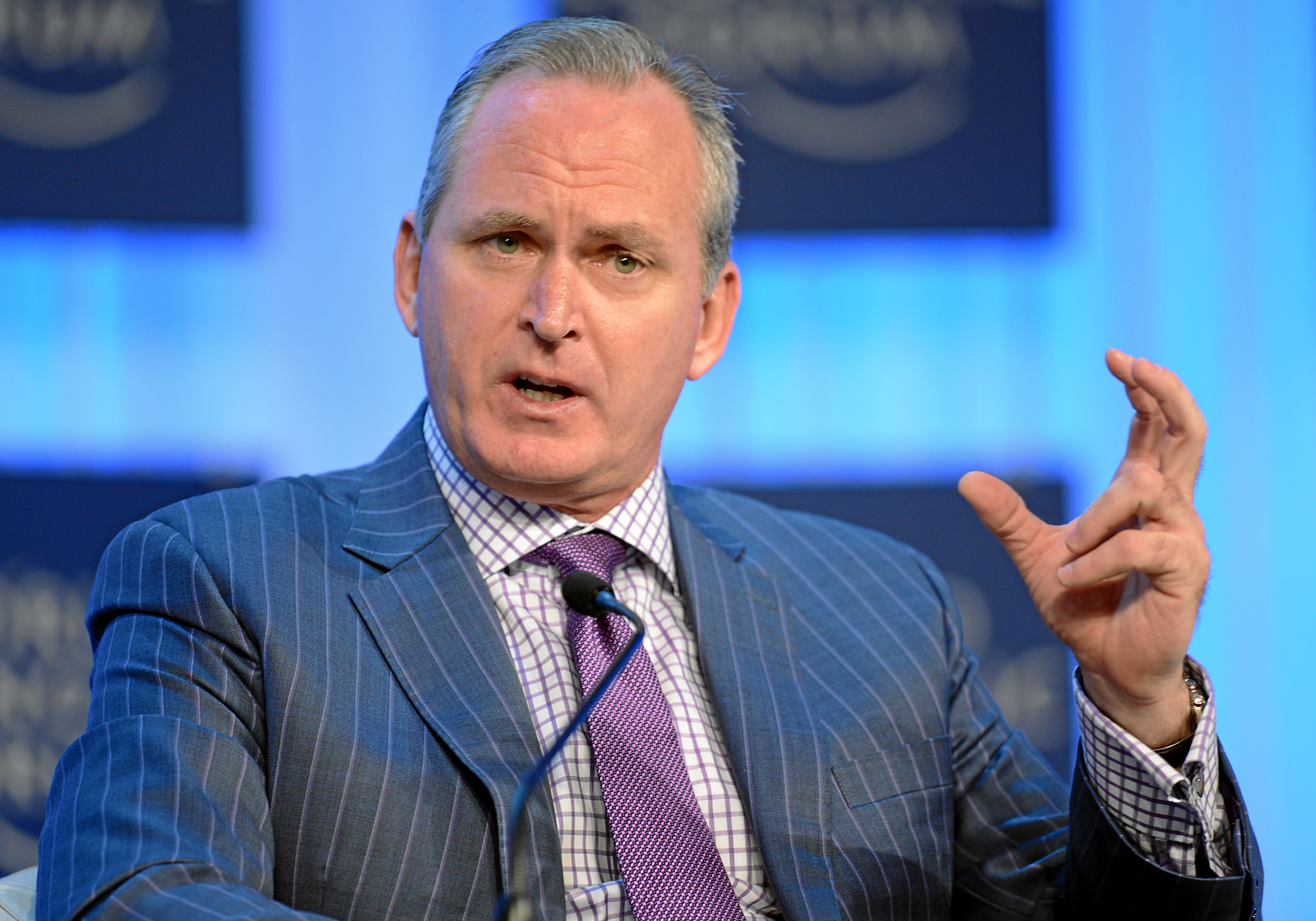
- Kelly at the World Economic Forum annual meeting in Davos, 2013
- Born: L. Kevin Kelly
- Education: George Mason University; Duke University
- Known for: Chief Executive Officer Public and Private Organizations

L. Kevin Kelly is currently the chairman and CEO Cycurion Nasdaq (CYCU).

== Early life and career ==
Kevin was raised in Virginia and received a Bachelor of Science from George Mason University and an MBA from Duke University. Kevin has lived and worked all over the world, including Tokyo, London, New York, and Chicago.

Kevin began what would become his pivotal role in leadership consultancy at the executive search firm, Heidrick & Struggles. Kelly joined the Heidrick & Struggles' Tokyo office in 1997. He later served as regional managing partner of Asia Pacific and then Europe, the Middle East, and Africa from 2001 to 2006. He became chief executive officer in 2006.

Throughout his career, he has focused on the challenges of leadership and has authored four books on the subject: “CEO-The Low Down on the Top Job” (2008); “Top Jobs – How They are Different and What You Need to Succeed” (2009); and “Leading in Turbulent Times” (2010) and "Paragraph 3" (2023)

After Heidrick & Struggles, Kevin became the president and CEO of Asia Pulp and Paper NA.
