= Ranbaxy Laboratories =

Defunct Indian pharmaceutical manufacturer

Ranbaxy Laboratories Limited
- Type: Subsidiary
- Industry: Pharmaceuticals
- Founded: 1961
- Founders: Ranbir Singh; Gurbax Singh
- Defunct: 2014; 12 years ago
- Fate: Acquired by Sun Pharma
- Successor: Sun Pharmaceuticals
- Headquarters: Gurgaon, Haryana, India
- Key people: Arun Sawhney (CEO, Ranbaxy Laboratories); Joji Nakayama(CEO, Daiichi Sankyo)
- Number of employees: 10,983 (2012)
- Parent: Sun Pharmaceuticals

Ranbaxy Laboratories Limited was an Indian multinational pharmaceutical company that was incorporated in India in 1961 and remained an entity until 2014. The company went public in 1973. Ownership of Ranbaxy changed twice over the course of its history.

In 2008, Japanese pharmaceutical company Daiichi Sankyo acquired a controlling share in Ranbaxy and in 2014, Sun Pharma acquired 100% of Ranbaxy in an all-stock deal. The Sun Pharma acquisition brought all new management to Ranbaxy, which had been laden with controversy. Sun is the world's fifth largest specialty generic pharmaceutical company.

== History ==
=== Formation ===
Ranbaxy was started by Ranbir Singh and Gurbax Singh in 1937 as a distributor for Japanese company Shionogi. The name Ranbaxy blends the names of its founders: Ranbir and Gurbax. In 1952, Bhai Mohan Singh bought the company from his cousins, Ranbir and Gurbax. After Bhai Mohan Singh's son Parvinder Singh joined the company in 1967, the company saw an increase in scale.

In the late 1990s, Ranbaxy formed Ranbaxy Pharmaceuticals as its American affiliate to supply the United States' demand for cheaper generic drugs. Parvinder helped manage this expansion by partnering with American businesswoman Agnes Varis.

=== Research and drug discovery ===
In April 2012, Ranbaxy received approval from the Central Drugs Standard Control Organisation (CDSCO) to market Synriam, a fixed-dose combination of arterolane maleate and piperaquine phosphate for treating uncomplicated Plasmodium falciparum malaria in adults. Developed in part with support from the Department of Science and Technology, Synriam was the first New Chemical Entity (NCE) developed in India.

=== Trading ===
For the twelve months ending on 31 December 2005, the company's global sales were US$1,178 million, with overseas markets accounting for 75% of global sales (USA: 28%, Europe: 17%, Brazil, Russia, and China: 29%).

In December 2005, Ranbaxy's share price was hit by a patent ruling disallowing production of its own version of Pfizer's cholesterol-cutting drug Lipitor, which had annual sales of more than $10 billion.

In June 2008, Ranbaxy settled the patent dispute with Pfizer, allowing them to sell atorvastatin calcium, the generic version of Lipitor and atorvastatin calcium-amlodipine besylate, the generic version of Pfizer's Caduet, in the US, starting on 30 November 2011.

On 23 June 2006, the US Food & Drug Administration granted Ranbaxy a 180-day exclusivity period to sell simvastatin (Zocor) in the US as a generic drug at 80 mg strength. Ranbaxy competed with the maker of brand-name Zocor, Merck & Co.; IVAX Corporation (which was acquired by and merged into Teva Pharmaceuticals), which has 180-day exclusivity at strengths other than 80 mg; and Dr. Reddy's Laboratories and India, whose authorized generic version (licensed by Merck) is exempt from exclusivity.

On 1 December 2011, Ranbaxy got approval from the FDA to launch the generic version of Lipitor in the United States after the drug's patent expired.

=== Acquisition by Daiichi Sankyo ===
In June 2008, Daiichi Sankyo purchased a 34.8% stake in Ranbaxy from CEO Malvinder Mohan Singh for ₹ 10,000 crore (US$2.4 billion) at ₹737 per share. By November 2008, Daiichi Sankyo completed its takeover by spending an additional $2.2 billion to become Ranbaxy's majority shareholder. Singh was initially contracted to remain as CEO for five years but was fired in May 2009 over a perceived indifference to quality control issues. He was replaced by former Novartis Senior Vice-President Yugal Sikri.

In 2011, Ranbaxy Global Consumer Health Care received the OTC Company of the year award. In 2012, 2013, and 2014 Brand Trust Reports, Ranbaxy was ranked 161st, 225th, and 184th, respectively, among India's most trusted brands.

In 2016, the Singapore International Court of Arbitration ordered former Ranbaxy shareholders to pay $525 million to Daiichi Sankyo for intentionally misleading the severity of regulatory scrutiny that the company was experiencing.

=== Acquisition by Sun Pharmaceutical ===
On 7 April 2014, India-based Sun Pharmaceutical and Japan-based Daiichi Sankyo jointly announced the sale of the entire 63.4% share of Ranbaxy from Daiichi Sankyo to Sun Pharmaceutical in a $4 billion all-share deal. Under these agreements, shareholders of Ranbaxy were to receive a 0.8 share of Sun Pharmaceutical for each share of Ranbaxy. After this acquisition, the partner Daiichi-Sankyo was to hold a stake of 9% in Sun Pharmaceutical.

== Controversies ==
In October 2003, Ranbaxy hired Lachman Consultant Services to audit the company. The investigation found that Ranbaxy's Patient Safety Department did not seriously investigate patient reports of ineffectiveness or harmful side effects, much less report such claims to the Food and Drug Administration (FDA). Lachman also identified poor record-keeping in Ranbaxy's manufacturing plants. In October 2004, Rajinder Kumar resigned as director of Ranbaxy's research and development after the board of directors refused to recall drugs that he had shown were approved using fraudulent testing. Dinesh Thakur, who had compiled the fraudulent data as Ranbaxy's director of Research Information & Portfolio Management, also resigned after the company tried planting pornography on his computer to initiate a for-cause firing. Kumar and Thakur's whistleblower reports prompted the FDA to issue an Import Alert for generic drugs produced from two of Ranbaxy's manufacturing plants in September 2008.

In February 2009, the FDA halted reviews of all Ranbaxy drug applications after finding that its manufacturing plant in Paonta Sahib frequently falsified data in approved and pending drug applications. When Ranbaxy sought approval of its Batamandi plant only 2.5 miles (4.0 km) away from the Paonta Sahib plant the prior year, FDA investigators proved that the company was merely pretending that products developed in Paonta Sahib were produced at this cleaner facility.

On 8 February 2012, three batches of the proton-pump inhibitor pantoprazole were recalled in the Netherlands due to the presence of impurities. On 9 November 2012, Ranbaxy halted production and recalled 41 lots of atorvastatin due to glass particles being found in some bottles. Also in 2012, an apparent dosage mistake was reported in which 20 mg tablets were found in a bottle of atorvastatin labeled as containing 10 mg tablets; this led in 2014 to the voluntary recall in the United States of some 64,000 bottles.

In May 2013, Ranbaxy pleaded guilty and paid $500 million in fines, for felony charges relating to the manufacture and distribution of certain adulterated drugs made at two of Ranbaxy's manufacturing facilities in India, and misrepresenting clinical generic drug data. Ranbaxy pleaded guilty to three felony violations of the Federal Food, Drug, and Cosmetic Act of 1938 and another four felony counts of knowingly making false statements to the FDA. Included in the adulterated products were antiretroviral (ARV) drugs destined for treatment of HIV/AIDS in Africa.

In September 2013, further problems were reported, including apparent human hair in a tablet, oil spots on other tablets, toilet facilities without running water, and a failure to instruct employees to wash their hands after using the toilet. Ranbaxy was prohibited from manufacturing FDA-regulated drugs at the Mohali facility until it complied with United States drug manufacturing requirements.

In 2014, the FDA notified Ranbaxy Laboratories, that it was prohibited from manufacturing and distributing active pharmaceutical ingredients (APIs) from its facility in Toansa, India, for FDA-regulated drug products. The FDA's inspection of the Toansa facility, which concluded on 11 January 2014, identified significant cGMP violations. These included Toansa staff retesting raw materials, intermediate drug products, and finished API after those items failed analytical testing and specifications, in order to produce acceptable findings, and subsequently not reporting or investigating these failures.

In 2019, investigative journalist Katherine Eban published Bottle of Lies, an in-depth investigation of generic drug manufactures. Aside from recounting the Ranbaxy scandals described above, Eban noted that FDA leaders suppressed internal awareness of Ranbaxy's fraud to maintain the supply of cheap generic drugs.

== See also ==
- The Truth Pill

== Works cited ==
- Eban, Katherine (2019). Bottle of Lies. HarperCollins. ISBN 9780062338785.
