= Bajpai =

Bajpai (variously spelt Bajpeyi, Vajpeyi, Vajpayee) is a Hindu Brahmin surname of Hindustani origin. It was a title given to a Vedic priest who had conducted a Vajapeya ritual.

Notable individuals with this surname include:

- Ambika Prasad Bajpai (1880–1968), Indian writer, news editor and scholar
- Amitabh Bajpai (born 1974), Indian politician
- Ananya Vajpeyi, Indian academic and writer
- Anil Kumar Bajpai (born 1957), Indian politician
- Arjun Vajpai (born 1993), Indian mountaineer
- Ashok Vajpeyi (born 1941), Indian poet and writer
- Ashok Bajpai (born 1949), Indian politician
- Atal Bihari Vajpayee (1924–2018), Prime Minister of India
- Bhagwati Dhar Vajpayee (died 2021), Indian journalist
- Ganesh Shankar Bajpai, Indian politician
- Gangadhara Vajapeyi, 18th-century Vedic scholar
- Girija Shankar Bajpai (1891–1954), knighted, first Minister of External Affairs
- G. S. Bajpai, Indian professor of law
- Harshvardhan Bajpai (born 1980), Indian politician
- Himanshu Bajpai (born 1987), Indian musician
- Indrani Bajpai (1930–1999), Indian classical dancer
- Katyayani Shankar Bajpai (1928–2020), Indian diplomat
- Kailash Vajpeyi (1936–2015), Indian Hindi poet, writer and lyricist
- Kanti Bajpai, Indian academic-analyst and former headmaster of The Doon School
- Laxmikant Bajpai (born 1951), Indian politician
- Laxmi Shankar Bajpai (born 1955), Indian poet
- Manikchandra Vajpayee (1919–2005), Indian journalist and writer
- Manoj Bajpayee (also Bajpai; born 1969), Indian actor
- Nand Dulare Bajpai (1906–1967), Indian literary critic
- Nandini Bajpai (born 1968), children's book author
- Nirupam Bajpai, Indian economist
- Pia Bajpiee (born 1992), Indian film actress and model, who appears primarily in South Indian films
- Punya Prasun Bajpai (born 1964), Indian journalist and TV anchor
- Rajendra Kumari Bajpai (1925–1998), Indian politician, represented Sitapur
- Sahana Bajpaie (born 1987), Indian singer and songwriter
- Sunil Bajpai (born 1961), Indian professor and paleontologist
- Swati Bajpai, Indian actress
- Tia Bajpai (born 1989), Indian singer, television and film actress
- Uma Shankar Bajpai (1921/1922–2005), Indian diplomat and journalist
- Vidya Dhar Bajpai, Indian politician
- Vineet Bajpai, Indian entrepreneur and author
