= The Doon School Weekly =

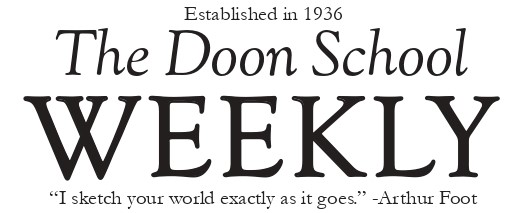

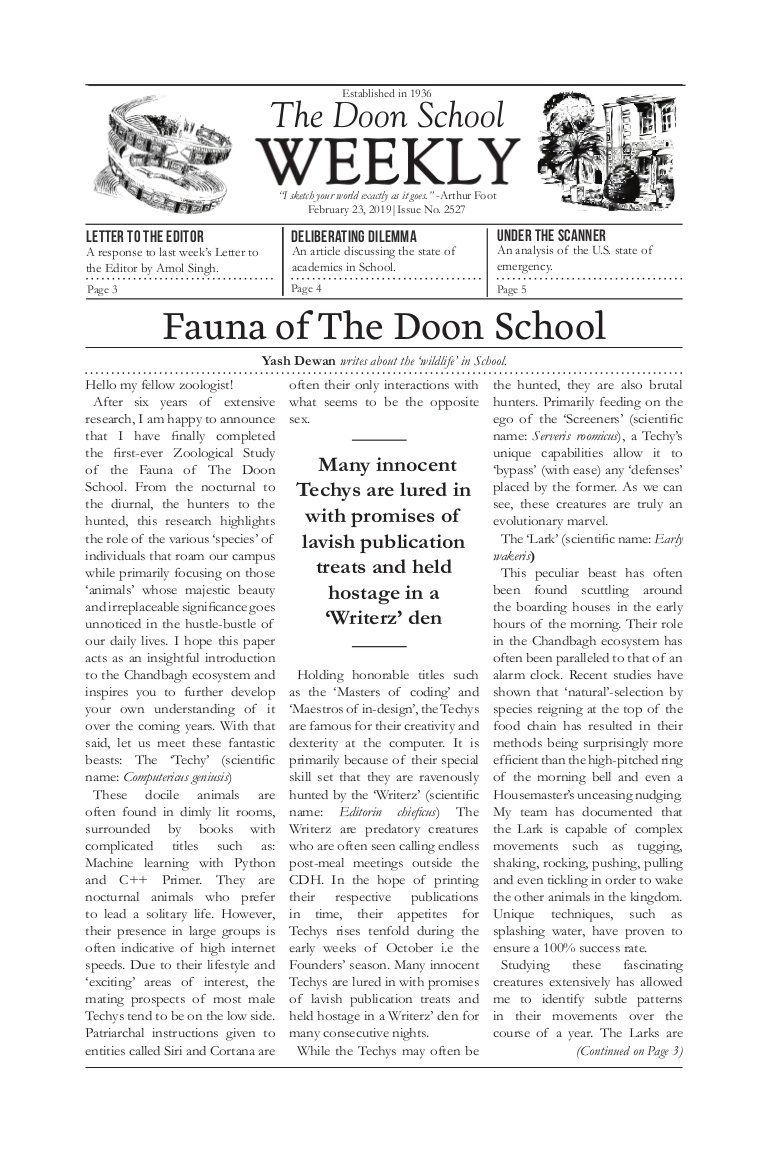
- Front page of The Doon School Weekly (February 23, 2019)
- Type: Weekly student newspaper
- Format: Compact
- Owner: The Doon School
- Publisher: Indian Public Schools' Society
- Editor-in-chief: Rehhan Chadha
- Founded: 1936 by Arthur Foot
- Political alignment: None
- Language: English
- Headquarters: Publications Room, Arts and Media Centre; The Doon School; Dehradun-248001; India
- Circulation: c. 1000 print issues
- Website: https://www.doonschool.com/the-doon-school-weekly/

The Doon School Weekly (informally The Weekly) is a student newspaper produced by and for the students of The Doon School. It was established in 1936, a year after the school's founding, by the first headmaster Arthur Foot. The Weekly is the oldest and flagship publication of the school.

The paper, distributed every Saturday morning, carries a mix of reports on school activities, trips or expeditions, opinion pieces, critique of school policies, interviews of visiting speakers, student polls, puzzles, cartoons (known as 'Dosco Doodle'), and creative writing, including short stories, poetry, satire or personal essays. The alumni keep up to date with the developments at school through the newspaper, which is also published online on The Doon School's official website.

Notable alumni in the fields of literature, journalism, politics and academia, including Vikram Seth, Amitav Ghosh, Ramachandra Guha, Karan Thapar, have been former editors of the publication. The Weekly's sister publications at the school include The Infinity, The Doon School Information Review, The Circle, and The Yearbook.

== History ==
Founded by Arthur Foot in 1936, The Doon School Weekly is owned by Indian Public Schools' Society, the governing society of The Doon School. For the first three years of its existence, the newspaper was produced using a cyclostyle, and then moved to a printing press. A number of the Weekly's contributors or editors are today working as authors, journalists, academics or politicians. The list includes Booker Prize-nominee Amitav Ghosh (class of 1972); playwright, poet and novelist Vikram Seth (class of 1970); editors, reporters and columnists for The Economic Times, Forbes, The Wall Street Journal, Hindustan Times, The Washington Post and The New York Times; a number of staff writers for The Times of India newspaper such as Swaminathan Aiyar and veteran editor B G Verghese, including broadcaster Karan Thapar (class of 1971), historian Ramchandra Guha (class of 1973), and politician Mani Shankar Aiyar (class of 1967); and Hindi language writer Vishvjit Singh (class of 1964); Foreign Secretary Uma Shankar Bajpai (class of 1936); Wajahat Habibullah (class of 1963) and Inder Pal Khosla (class of 1954); television-presenter Prannoy Roy and Tejeshwar Singh (class of 1965); and Mahmood Farooqui (class of 1979). On April 14, 2018, the Weekly published its 2,500th edition, commemorating 82 years of its existence. The edition includes contributions from previous chief-editors such as Karan Thapar, Kanti Bajpai, Rahul Bhagat and Govind Dhar.

== Structure and operations ==
The Weekly's editorial board is staffed by boys between year groups 9 and 12 at the school, with students in their final year leading the publication and taking key decisions. The selection process for the editorial board is competitive and consists of a written examination and personal interview with the board's leadership. The editor-in-chief, appointed by the school's administration, is the publication's chief executive and is responsible for content and day-to-day operations. He is assisted by the editors, the second-highest positions on the Editorial Board, who are also students in their final year of school. The length of a standard issue of the Weekly is 6-8 pages on legal-size ivory white paper. A special edition, released on the day of the school's annual Founder's Day, is printed in the form of a magazine. The Weekly is accessible in print on the school's premises, and is also available online.

== Notable former members ==
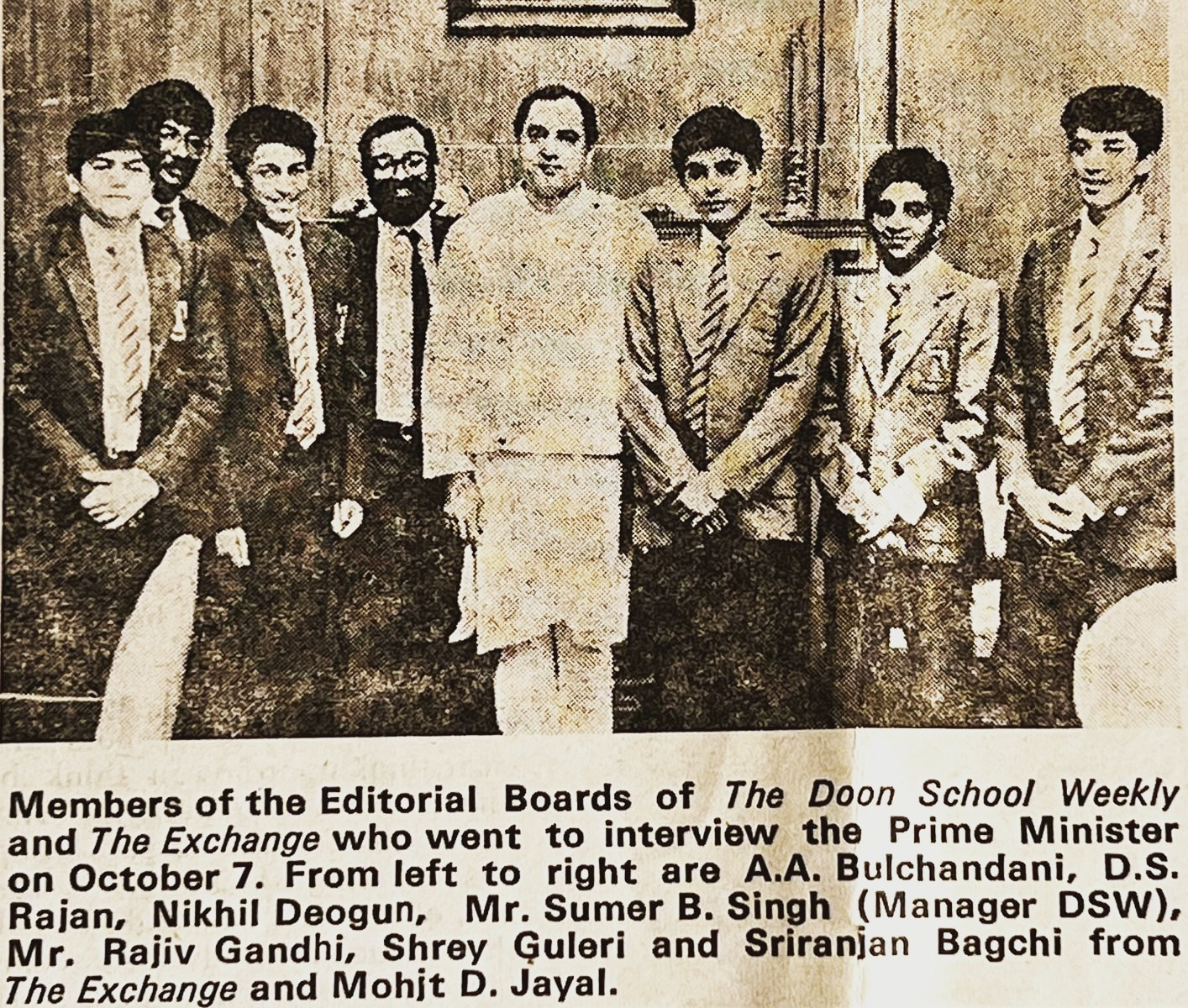
Editorial Board of the Weekly with the then Prime Minister Rajiv Gandhi, a Doon alumnus.

- Vikram Seth ('69, editor-in-chief) – Novelist, poet, librettist and playwright
- Swaminathan Aiyar ('60, editor-in-chief) – former India correspondent of The Economist; editor of The Economic Times and The Times of India
- Amitav Ghosh ('73, editor) – Novelist, former editor of Indian Express
- Ramchandra Guha ('73, contributor) – Historian
- Karan Thapar ('71, editor-in-chief) – Broadcaster for CNBC, BBC & CNN-IBN
- Prannoy Roy ('64, editor) – Founder of New Delhi Television
- Mani Shankar Aiyar ('58, editor) – former Union Cabinet minister for Congress
- Karan Singh ('49, contributor) – Rajya Sabha member
- Naveen Patnaik ('64, contributor) – Chief Minister of Odisha
- Vishvjit Singh ('64, contributor) – Poet and member of Indian National Congress
- Wajahat Habibullah ('63, contributor) – Chief Information Commissioner of India and chairman of the National Minorities Commission
- B G Verghese ('58, contributor) – Editor of Indian Express (1982–86) and The Times of India (1986–2005); Ramon Magsaysay Award winner
- Tejeshwar Singh ('65, editor) – Indian publisher, newscaster
- Vikram Chandra ('83, editor) – Broadcaster, news-presenter for New Delhi Television (NDTV)
- Ardashir Vakil ('78, editor) – Novelist
- Kanti Bajpai ('72, editor-in-chief) – Former headmaster of The Doon School and vice dean of the Lee Kuan Yew School of Public Policy
- Nikhil Deogun ('87, contributor) – Former deputy managing editor of The Wall Street Journal
