= Vikram Chandra =

Vikram Chandra may refer to:

- Vikram Chandra (novelist) (born 1961), Indian-American writer
- Vikram Chandra (journalist) (born 1967), Indian television journalist
