= Vyavahāra =

Concept of Hindu law denoting legal procedure

Vyavahāra (Sanskrit: व्यवहार) is an important concept of Hindu law denoting legal procedure. The term is analyzed by Kātyāyana as follows: "Vi means ‘various,’ ava means ‘doubt,’ hara is ‘removal’; legal procedure is called by the term vyavahāra because ‘it removes various doubts.’” Kane defines it as follows: "When the ramifications of right conduct, that are together called dharma and that can be established with efforts (of various kinds such as truthful speech, etc.) have been violated, the dispute (in a court between parties) which springs from what is sought to be proved (such as debt), is said to be vyavahāra." According to Donald Davis, “There are two basic meanings of vyavahāra. The first is a general sense of practice, business, or everyday transactions. The other, specific sense is legal procedure, the processes of litigation including a trial.” Legal procedure according to the dharmaśāstras includes: court, listening to and assessing witnesses and their testimony, deciding and enforcing punishment, and the pursuit of Justice in the face of Injustice. Davis later quotes the Nāradasmṛti in an attempt to answer the question why legal procedure came about in the Hindu tradition. The text states, “When men had dharma as their only focus and were speakers of the truth, there was no legal procedure, no enmity, and no (selfish) conflict. Legal procedure came into being when dharma was lost among men."

== Courts ==
According to the Smṛti of Bṛhaspati there are four different kinds of courts of justice. The pratiṣṭhitā is a court established in a fixed place such as a town, the apratiṣṭhitā is not fixed in one place, but moving from place to place as on a circuit, the mudritā is the court of a judge appointed by the king, who is authorized to uses the royal seal, and the śāsitā is the court in which the king himself presides. The court assignment of a case was also very influenced by the situation of the litigants. "For those who stay in the forest the session should be held in the forest, for the soldiers in the army, and for the merchants in the caravans." Furthermore, “[t]he court-house should be decorated with flowers, statues, paintings, idols of gods and should be furnished with incense, throne or seat (for the king or judge), seeds, fires and water." There is also differentiation among the different grades of courts. The king's courts are the highest grade, “but other tribunals were recognized in the smṛtis and digests." It appears there were no court fees in ancient India, except for fines imposed by the king, and texts such as the Viṣṇudharmasūtra, NāradaSmṛti, Yājñavalkya Smṛti, and Kauṭilya’s Arthaśāstra prescribe rules for payment after a suit was decided.

=== The King's Role ===
The King or Kṣatriya has the responsibility of overseeing legal procedure and then enforcing their results. According to Nārada, "The king is the assistant of the sacred law when two people are engaged in a lawsuit; he should investigate cases accurately, free from affection or hatred." For the King, vyavahāra is part of his personal caste dharma. In the section on laws for the king, the Manu-Smṛti states, “Arranging in this manner for the discharge of all his obligations, he should protect these subjects with care and vigilance. When bandits abduct from his realm subjects screaming for help, while he and men in his service stand by—he is surely dead, he is not alive. For a Kṣatriya, the protection of his subjects is the highest Law; the enjoyment of the specified rewards binds the king to this Law.” The king's personal dharma is inextricably linked to legal proceedings and his dharma is determined by the merits and demerits of his subjects, therefore it is crucial he bring about justice. This is why it is stressed in the dharmaśāstras how important it is for the king to be fair and righteous and to appoint learned Brahmins to counsel and help him in legal matters. If the king cannot be present at a legal proceeding, he appoints a Brahmin to take his place. In the absence of a Brahmin, a kşatriya should be appointed; in the absence of a kşatriya, a vaiśya.

=== Judges ===
Cases were examined by either the king or by the chief judge. The chief judge collaborated with the other judges to devise the questions necessary for investigation, and "[i]n a lawsuit he puts question and counter-question; he speaks first in a friendly way. Therefore he is said to be the prādvivāka (=chief judge)." The Smṛti of Kātyāyana states that, “ The chief judge and the sabhyas were not to hold conversation in private with any one of the litigants while the suit was pending and if they did so they were liable to be fined.” . If a decision is given that is against the smṛti and usage, through friendship, greed or fear, each was liable to be fined twice as much as the fine to be paid by the defeated party. Kane states, “it was believed that when a just decision was given, the king and his sabhyas became free from sin, the sin only reaches him when he is guilty (whether plaintiff or defendant); but where an unjust decision is rendered a quarter of the sin falls on the litigant (plaintiff or defendant) who is guilty of adharma (that which is not in accord with the law), one quarter each on the witnesses, the sabhyas and the kings. Additionally, a judge were to be banished (1) if they utter injustice, (2) if they live on bribery, or (3) if they betray other people’s confidence. “A false judge, a false witness, and the murderer of a brahmana are said to be equally deep in guilt.”

== Legal Proceedings ==
There are four parts of Hindu legal procedure:

1. The Plaint
2. The Reply
3. The Trial
4. The Decision

=== The Plaint ===
A plaint is a probandum, i.e. “of something that deserves to be proved, of a quality-bearer characterized by qualities that deserve to be demonstrated. Thus, it means: a valid plaint is an utterance of (the plaintiff’s) own opinion.” The valid plaint must be 1) free from the defects of the statement, 2) provided with a valid cause, 3) definite, 4) in accordance with common practice, 5) concisely worded, 6) explicit, 7) free from doubts, 8) free from contradictory causes, 9) capable of meeting opposing arguments. Therefore, the king should reject a plaint if it is “1) unknown (not made by anybody), 2) defective, 3) meaningless, 4) purposeless, 5) unprovable, or 6) adverse.” A plaint is unknown if it is not made by anybody, and it is adverse if it is directed against the chief judge, the king, a town, or the kingdom. According to Nārada, “The statement (of the plaint) is considered to be the fundamental part of legal procedures; if the plaintiff falls short of it, he is lost; if he carries it through, he is successful.” Once a plaint is made, the plaintiff cannot change it (i.e. changing the amount of money the plaintiff believes another man owes him). Additionally, the plaint needs to be written down, with all minute details of the situation recorded, or it is considered invalid. Most plaints included one of the eighteen Hindu titles of law, called the Vyavahārapadas.

==== Vyavahārapadas ====
Vyavahārapada means "the topic or subject matter of litigation or dispute." Manu (Hinduism) divided the vyavahārapadas into eighteen titles of law. Manu acknowledged that "the enumeration of the 18 vyavahārapadas was a matter of a convenient arrangement and that the number 18 did not embrace all disputes whatever but only the largest number of disputes and the most important among them." The eighteen titles of law include "(i) the first is the non-payment of debts; (ii) deposits; (iii) sale without ownership; (iv) partnerships; (v) delivery and non-delivery of gifts; (vi) non-payment of wages; (vii) breach of contract; (viii) cancellation of a sale or purchase; (ix) disputes between owners and herdsman; (x) the Law on boundary disputes; (xi) verbal assault; (xii) physical assault; (xiii) theft; (xiv) violence; (xv) sexual crimes against women; (xvi) Law concerning husband and wife; (xvii) partition of inheritance; and (xviii) gambling and betting.”

==== Wagers ====
The plaint is also sometimes accompanied by a legal wager, or paņa. A legal proceeding is attended with a wager if “before writing down the plaint, a wager is placed like this: ‘The one who is defeated here will give so much to the winner by way of punishment.’" If the litigant who places a wager loses the case, he must pay both the wager amount they placed and the punishment for the crime. However, if one litigant places a wager and the opposing party does not, and the waging litigant is successful in the case, the defeated litigant need only pay the fine for the crime, not the wager. In a sense, a wager can be seen as a form of evidence; if a defendant wages his entire estate in his defense, he must be certain of his innocence. Additionally, a wager is only considered legitimate if it is articulated in a written agreement between the litigants. The specific logistics of wager-placing are unclear; “it is uncertain whether the paņa is made by one or both of the parties, whether it is paid to the ‘winner’ of the suit or to the king, and what size the paņa must be.”. The Mitākṣarā of Vijñāneśvara on Yājñavalkya 2.18 explains the wager payment in the following way: “There in that legal proceeding which includes a ‘wager,’ the king should make the loser, the defeated one, pay the aforementioned fine and his wager to the king, and the amount under litigation to the plaintiff.”

=== The Reply ===
After a valid plaint has been made, the king should order the reply to be given. The amount of time given to a defendant to produce his reply is based upon a few things, including when the act in question was committed and the strength of the case. According to Kātyāna, “[a] reply is not valid when it is not connected with the subject, when it is too concise, when it is too broad, and when it pervades only part of the thesis.” There are four types of reply in Hindu law procedure:

1. Confession
2. Reply by Way of Denial
3. Reply by Way of Exception
4. Reply by Way of Former Judgment

==== Confession ====
A reply by confession is when the defendant agrees with the plaint, i.e. if the plaint is, “You owe me a hundred coins” and the reply is, “Yes I do.” Some argue that a confession makes the plaint invalid; if someone is trying to prove something that the defendant agrees to be true, the plaintiff's statement suffers from the defect of siddha-sādhana (proving what is proved) Others, such as Vācaspati, disagree, arguing that the point of judicial procedure is the establishment of truth, and a plaint responded to with a confession serves this purpose.

==== Reply by Way of Denial ====
Following with the previous plaint example of “You owe me a hundred coins because you borrowed them from me” a reply by way of denial would respond with, “I do not owe you a hundred coins.” In this circumstance, the defendant is denying that he ever borrowed the coins at all.

==== Reply by Way of Exception ====
A reply by way of exception to the plaint, “You owe me a hundred coins because you borrowed them from me” would be “I do not owe you a hundred coins, since I paid them back,” or “I do not owe you a hundred coins, since I received them as a gift.” In the first instance, the defendant is agreeing with the plaint that he had borrowed a hundred coins, but he raises an exception (“I paid them back”), and therefore does not owe the plaintiff the money. In the second example, the defendant denies that he ever borrowed a hundred coins but received them in another way and thus does not owe them.

==== Reply by Way of Former Judgment ====
If the plaint “You owe me a hundred coins because you borrowed them from me” was responded to with “I do not owe you a hundred coins, since this matter has been decided in the court before,” or “I do not owe you a hundred coins, because I never borrowed them, and that matter has been previously settled in court” that would be an example by reply by way of former judgment. In these cases, the defendant either agrees or disagrees he had previously borrowed the money, but due to the intervening fact that “this matter has been decided in the court before,” he does not owe the money regardless.

=== The Trial ===
If the reply is found to be valid, a trial is granted. Unlike the leniency given for the time to produce a reply, “[n]o delay should be granted in producing witnesses and making them depose.” There are two kinds of trial: human and divine.

==== The Burden of Proof ====
If the reply is by way of exception or by way of former judgment, the burden of proof is upon the defendant. In the case of a denial, it's upon the plaintiff, and if there was a confession, there is no burden. The burden is on the plaintiff in the case of a denial because asking the defendant to prove this would be asking him to prove a negative, i.e. prove he did NOT borrow the coins. The burden should be upon a party to prove a positive aspect, i.e. proving the defendant DID borrow the coins.

==== Human Evidence ====
Human trials produce evidence including witnesses, documents, and possession, and divine trials involve oaths and ordeals administered to the defendant.

===== Witnesses =====
In a trial, there can be a minimum of three witnesses and a maximum of nine. A competent witness is explained by Manu: “Householders, those who have a son, those born of an indigenous family, whether satriyas, vaishyas, or shudras, are competent witnesses if they are produced by a party.” Yājñavalkya elaborates, explaining “[w]itnesses should be ascetics, liberally disposed, of good family, speaking truth, eminent in the sacred law, honest, having a son, well to do.” A witness can be considered incompetent in a number of ways including: on account of a text (brāhmanas, devotees, ascetics, and aged people should not be summoned as witnesses due to their figuring in authoritative texts), because of viciousness (no truth can be found in witnesses who are thieves, violent people, etc.), because of discord (if witnesses’ statements are contradictory), a deposition suo motu (witness comes and speaks on his own accord without having been appointed), and a witness of intervening death (witness died before trial).

Once a witness is determined to be competent, the chief judge should question them one-by-one, in front of the plaintiff and defendant, beginning with the plaintiff's witnesses. Manu explains the proceedings as follows: Manu: “In the morning (the judge), after being purified himself, shall ask the twice-born people to deliver true evidence. They too, shall be purified, face eastward of northward, and stand close to gods or brāhamaņas. The chief judge….should address them in the following terms: ‘Declare everything you know about how these people have mutually behaved with regard to this case; for you are a witness to it.’”

The truth-telling of witnesses is considered of extremely high importance. “When a witness speaks the truth in s deposition, he reaches the most magnificent worlds, and here he obtains an unsurpassed fame; such a speech is created by Brahman.” Witnesses who give false statements on the stand, however, reach “the same worlds as the perpetrators of sins and minor sins, incendiaries, and the murderers of women and children.” Additionally, false witnesses should serve a punishment twice as high as the subject-matter of the lawsuit.

Expert witness testimony should be respected in all cases. According to Rocher, "each and every case must be decided in association with persons who are experts in that field." For example, if a merchant were being charged with a crime, a decision is not possible without the expert testimony of other merchants. Furthermore, the cases of ascetics should not be decided without experts acquainted with the three Vedas.

===== Documents =====
The second mode of human evidence is documents. As helpful as witnesses are in trials, “[t]he ancient authors have been fully aware of the extreme weakness of human memory: if made after a certain lapse of time, the deposition of witnesses loses its validity because they are likely to have forgotten many an important detail.” Therefore, a second form of evidence that may be presented at trial is that of a document, which is considered more reliable evidence than witness testimony. There are two types of documents as prescribed by vyavahāra: public and private documents. The two major forms of public documents (although there are more) are official grants of land or the like, and documents of success (delivered by the king to the victorious party in a lawsuit). These documents, due to their official nature, do not need to meet many criterion to be taken as reliable evidence. Private documents, on the other hand, which include principal civil transactions (partitions, gifts, mortgages, debts, etc.) have to meet far more conditions. There are many possible defects of private documents that would render them illegitimate evidence. For one, the person who created the document can’t be a child or mentally insane, and they can’t have been intoxicated or under fear or misfortune when drawing up the document. Additionally, the content of the document needs to be very descriptive. It needs to clearly indicate the nature of the subject and describe details of all persons involved and bear the exact date and place of the transaction.

===== Possession =====
The third mode of human evidence is possession, and it is considered a much surer means of proof than the other two. In order for possession to serve as adequate evidence, “it must be supported by a title, it must be of longstanding, uninterrupted, not claimed by others, and held in the presence of the other party.” If a title (property) accompanies the ownership, the possession and the title need to be produced simultaneously, and if there is no title, the possession needs to be of longstanding. Although texts disagree about how much time someone has to have possession of something before they have ownership of it, the general consensus seems to be three uninterrupted generations.

==== Divine Evidence ====
===== The Oath =====
Very little is known about the oaths taken in Hindu courts. “Hindu Law only knew the oath imposed by the judge: in the absence of human modes of proof, he invites the party to swear an oath which will constitute sufficient evidence for the case to be decided upon.” The oath can take many different forms based upon a person's caste. “Witnesses should swear by gold, silver, a cow, corn, Sũrya, Agni, an elephant’s shoulder, a horse’s back, the box of a chariot, or weapons, or by their son or grandson. One should select different (oaths) according to their caste.” For example, a kșastriya would swear by his chariot or gold, a vaiśya by his cows, seeds, or gold, etc.

===== The Ordeal =====
While oaths should be administered in small cases, ordeals should be reserved for heavier crimes. According to Kātyāyana, “When the witnesses are equal, one should purge (one’s cause) by means of an ordeal; and equally so in case of a lawsuit that involves capital punishment, even if witnesses are available.” The number of ordeals is different in various texts, ranging from two listed by Manu to nine listed by Brihaspati. A few examples of ordeals are as follows: In the ordeal of the balance, the defendant is weighed twice within a short interval of time. If he weighs less the second time, he is considered innocent; if he weighs equally or more, he is declared guilty. In the ordeal of fire, the person has to walk a certain distance carrying a red-hot iron ball in his hand. If his hand is not injured at the end of the day, he is innocent. In the ordeal of the grains of rice, the person has to swallow and spit out grains of rice which have undergone a special treatment. He is declared guilty if, when spitting out the grains, his saliva is mixed with blood. The ordeal to be administered is selected “according to the nature of the crime, according to the status of the individual who is to undergo it, and according to the time when the ordeal is to be administered.”

=== The Decision ===
Vyāsa describes the following kinds of decisions: by valid means of proof (document, witnesses, possession), by motives (inferences and logical speculation), by customs (local rules established for a long time), by an oath, by a royal decree, or by reconciliation of the parties. Nārada classifies the decisions in a different way, differentiating between sacred law, positive law, custom, and royal decrees. Sacred law refers to a decision in which “a case has been duly investigated, decided in accordance with circumstance, and examined by means of oaths, it should be known as a decision by the sacred law.” Positive law, on the other hand, is a decision made based upon the prescriptions. A decision is determined by custom if it is made according to local rules and the customs of the people. A royal decree is “[w]hen kings consider a particular custom to be contrary to equity, in the same way this custom should be annulled by a royal decree.” The punishment of the defeated party is related to the reply of the accused. A defendant who lost the case after delivering a reply by way of denial, exception, or former judgment should pay the disputed amount to the plaintiff and an equal amount to the king. If the defendant wins, the plaintiff should pay a fine twice as high as the amount mentioned in the plaint. In the case of a confession, the defendant pays half the fine he would pay if he had denied the plaint and was defeated. Certain guidelines must be followed in determining the fine for the defeated party. For example, Kātyāyana explains the fines to be given in trials of ordeals: “In case of poison, water, fire, the balance, holy water, rice, and the ordeal by the hot piece of gold, he should inflict fine on the defeated according to the following gradation: a thousand, six hundred, five hundred, four, three, two, and one hundred, and less.”

All these aspects of the trial, including the statements of the plaintiff, defendant, witnesses, and decision-maker, should be written down in great detail in a document called a ‘certificate of the decree’ for future judicial reference.

== Overlap with Ācāra ==
Occasionally, the realms of ācāra and vyavahāra overlap, such as in the case of the administration of temples. The king is involved in some areas of temple administration. It is part of his duty to punish those interfere with or ruin the property of the temples. This even includes the trees that are on or near holy ground, with a fine of 40 units for cutting off a twig. The king would appoint a devatādhyakṣa, an officer who superintends the temples. In an emergency, this superintendent would gather the wealth of the temples and place it at the disposal of the king, who would presumably repay it. It is also ordained that the king should not deprive temples of their properties. Other details pertaining to the administration of temples deal with the institutions in charge of running the temples, and therefore fall more into the realm of ācāra.

== See also ==
- Classical Hindu law
- Classical Hindu law in practice
- Hindu Titles of Law
- Hinduism
- Vyavahāramālā
