= Peter McLaughlin =

Historian and education manager from Northern Ireland

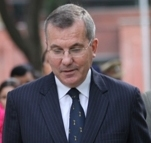
- Peter McLaughlin with Camilla, Duchess of Cornwall during her visit to The Doon School in November 2013
- Born: 1956 (age 69–70); Northern Ireland
- Education: University of Rhodesia (BA, MA); London School of Economics (PhD, PGCE)
- Occupations: Academic, writer, executive
- Spouse: Elizabeth McLaughlin
- Writing career
- Subjects: War studies, Political history, International relations, Economics
- Notable works: The Rhodesian War: A Military History; The Occupation of Mashonaland; Ragtime Soldiers: The Rhodesian experience in The Great War
- Website: www.doonschool.com/dr-peter-mclaughlin

Peter McLaughlin (born 1956) is an Irish academic, historian, and educator. He is the CEO of Max Learning Limited, the educational arm of the Max Group. He was Headmaster of The Doon School. Before joining Doon in 2009, he served as Headmaster of Douai School, and Principal of the British International School in Cairo and of Casterton School in England. McLaughlin retired from Doon in May 2016.

== Education ==
McLaughlin was born in Northern Ireland and raised in Africa. He was educated at Prince Edward School in Salisbury, Rhodesia, and at the University of Rhodesia, also in Salisbury, where he read history. He then studied for a Postgraduate Certificate in Education at the London School of Economics, United Kingdom.

== Career ==
- Lecturer in Modern history, University of Rhodesia, Salisbury, 1977–1983 (University of Zimbabwe from 1980, Harare from 1982)
- Research fellow, London School of Economics, 1980–1983
- Headmaster, Deputy Head, Housemaster and Teacher at St. George's College (HMC), Weybridge, Surrey 1983–1997
- Headmaster of Douai School (HMC), 1997–1999
- Headmaster of British International School in Cairo, Cairo, 1999–2005
- Headmaster of Casterton School (GSA), Casterton, Cumbria, 2005–2009
- Headmaster of The Doon School (HMC, IBSC), India, 2009–2016

== Work ==
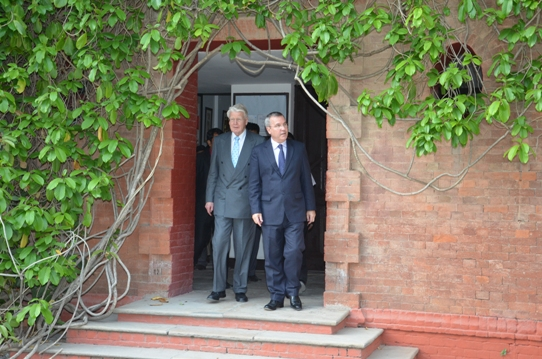
Peter McLaughlin welcoming the President of Iceland, Ólafur Ragnar Grímsson, to Doon in April 2013.

McLaughlin's doctorate was a study of the role of British Imperial defence policy in shaping the Rhodesian armed forces from the 1890s to the 1950s. During the Rhodesian Bush War, he served in operational areas as a field reservist in the British South Africa Police (BSAP). He set up the War Studies course at the University of Rhodesia (now the University of Zimbabwe) and was awarded an Association of Commonwealth Universities Post-doctoral Fellowship to the London School of Economics to study the British munitions industry in the First World War. He left the world of research and lecturing to carve out a successful career as a headmaster at major Private schools in England. From 1999 to 2005 he was the Principal of the British International School in Cairo before his departure to head Casterton School.

In 2009, McLaughlin moved to India to head an independent boarding school, The Doon School, succeeding Kanti Bajpai. He has lived in Dehradun in India ever since. In 2016, McLaughlin announced his early retirement from The Doon School with three years left on his second contract as Headmaster, and submitted his resignation to Chairman of the Board of Governors Gautam Thapar. He was succeeded by Matthew Raggett, a British educator.

== Family ==
McLaughlin is married to Elizabeth McLaughlin and has two sons.

== Bibliography ==
- Ragtime Soldiers: The Rhodesian experience in The Great War (1980), by Peter McLaughlin. Books of Zimbabwe, ISBN 978-0-86920-234-0.
- The Occupation of Mashonaland (1982), by Peter McLaughlin. Books of Zimbabwe, ISBN 978-0-86920-192-3.
- The Rhodesian War: A Military History(2008), by Peter McLaughlin. Stackpole Books, ISBN 978-0-8117-0725-1.

Academic offices
Preceded by Kanti Bajpai	Headmaster of The Doon School; 2009–2016	Succeeded by Matthew Raggett
