= Vajpayee ministry =

Vajpayee ministry may refer to:

- First Vajpayee ministry, the Indian government headed by Atal Bihari Vajpayee in 1996
- Second Vajpayee ministry, the Indian government headed by Atal Bihari Vajpayee from 1998 to 1999
- Third Vajpayee ministry, the Indian government headed by Atal Bihari Vajpayee from 1999 to 2004

== See also ==
- Bajpai or Vajpayee, an Indian surname
- Atal Bihari Vajpayee (1924–2018), the Indian prime minister heading these governments
