= Robert Lingat =

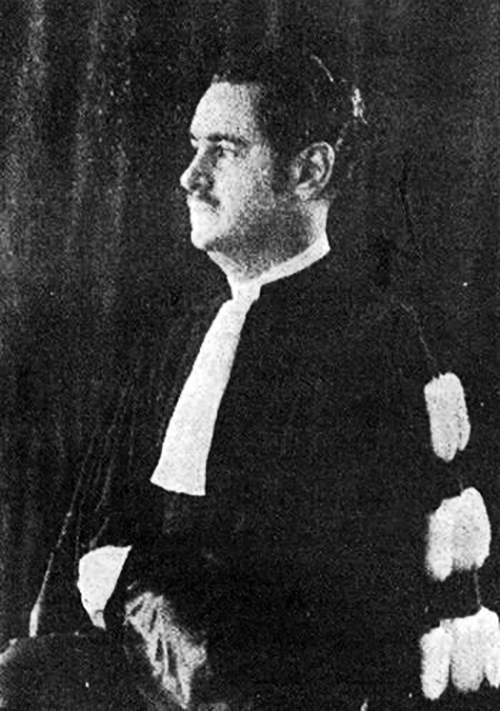
Lingat

Robert Lingat (Rō̜ Lǣngkā, Thai: โรแบร์ แลงกาต์, 1892 – 1972), was a French-born academic and legal scholar most known for his masterwork on the practice of classical Hindu Law. He died on 7 May 1972, one year before the first English translation of his work established it as the single most authoritative text on the concept of dharma in Indian legal history. This followed three decades after his three-volume Thai-language edition of Siamese laws (1939-1940) earned him recognition from renowned legal scholar John Henry Wigmore as "the greatest (and almost the only) authority on Siamese legal history," adding: "It will be a notable day when the learned editor will produce for us (as surely he is destined to do) a translation in French."

== Early life ==
Lingat was born in Charleville in 1892, and though not much is known of his personal life. After graduating from École nationale des Arts et Métiers, he received his doctorate in law in Paris in 1919. He married in 1920 Leontine Drouet and had three daughters, Pauline Vicheney (1935-2018), Liliane Bongiorni (1937-2021) and Renée Richard (born in 1939). He moved to work in Bangkok as a legal adviser between 1924 and 1940 where he became involved in the growing debate regarding the origin of the Indian legal system.

== Works ==
During his time at the Faculty of Law, Thammasat University (then known in English as University of Moral and Political Sciences), he edited a three-volume set of Siamese laws from official manuscripts of the Law Code of 1805 (1166 Chula Sakarat) promulgated in the first reign of the Chakkri dynasty, under the Three Seals. In 1941, Lingat submitted to the university a thesis on the history of Thai land tenure, later published in 1949. After the outbreak of the Franco-Thai War (October 1940 – 9 May 1941) and during the Japanese occupation of Hanoï, Lingat there published another work on Thailand. He worked at several universities in the former French colonies where, among other things, he was named Professor in the faculty of Law in Indo-China in 1941. Returning to Thammasat, he taught in French with translators rendering his instructions into Thai — a post which he held until 1955. In 1961 he left his post at a university in Cambodia to return to France where, until shortly before his death, he taught at the Center for Indian Studies at the University of Paris.

There he published the French edition of The Classical Law of India, in which he details the origin of the Indian legal system. The book draws heavily on the work of P. V. Kane and Max Müller, but is at the same time very innovative in its approach. He also used Professor Ram Sharan Sharma's works to have an idea on ancient India. It was originally published in French in 1967 and translated to English by J. Duncan M. Derrett in 1973. It has since become the standard textbook for those who wish to learn about the history of the Indian legal system. His work condenses the enormous volume of Indian literature into one fairly short book — unlike P.V Kane who published his findings in an incredibly dense and long series of books. Wigmore (1940) notes that authors of elaborate treatises represented "...mainly their own elaborations of detail as to what the law ought to be; but they did not necessarily represent what the law really was in practice." He then illustrates Lingat's approach with a quote translated from his L'Influence Indoue dans 'ancien Droit Siamois (Paris 1937) p. 18:

The dharmasastras [books of law] are not ordinary legal treatises expounding the actual law of the country. The science of law was connected with the study of Veda [religious texts]. The latter leads to the study of the rules which necessarily control human societies and are independent of human wills. It reveals to men the principles which should inspire their conduct if they wish to live the meritorious life. They are thus analogous to the European "natural law." But while the European theorists of the "natural law" seldom went beyond the vague region of generalities and the exposition of fundamental principles, the Hindus proceeded to deduce from these principles a mass of detailed and precise rules. Thus the dharmasastras, while theoretically expounding only natural (not positive) law, in fact regulated the entire legal life of man. Hence they were liable to be mistaken for genuine legal treatises.

== Journal of the Siam Society (JSS) ==
Lingat was a frequent contributor to the Journal of the Siam Society. Some of the articles that he wrote, or which refer to his published works, have been made available on line by the Siamese Heritage Protection Program.

- Lingat, R. (1933). "History of Wat Pavaranivesa" (PDF). Journal of the Siam Society. 26 (1). Siamese Heritage Trust.
- Vol. 27.1 1935 Le Culte du Bouddha d'Emeraude Lingat, R.
- Vol. 28.2 1935 Les trois Bangkok recorders (Notes) Lingat, R.
- Lingat, R. (1950). "Evolution of the Conception of Law in Burma and Siam" (PDF). Journal of the Siam Society. 38 (1). Siamese Heritage Trust: 13–24.

== Personal life ==
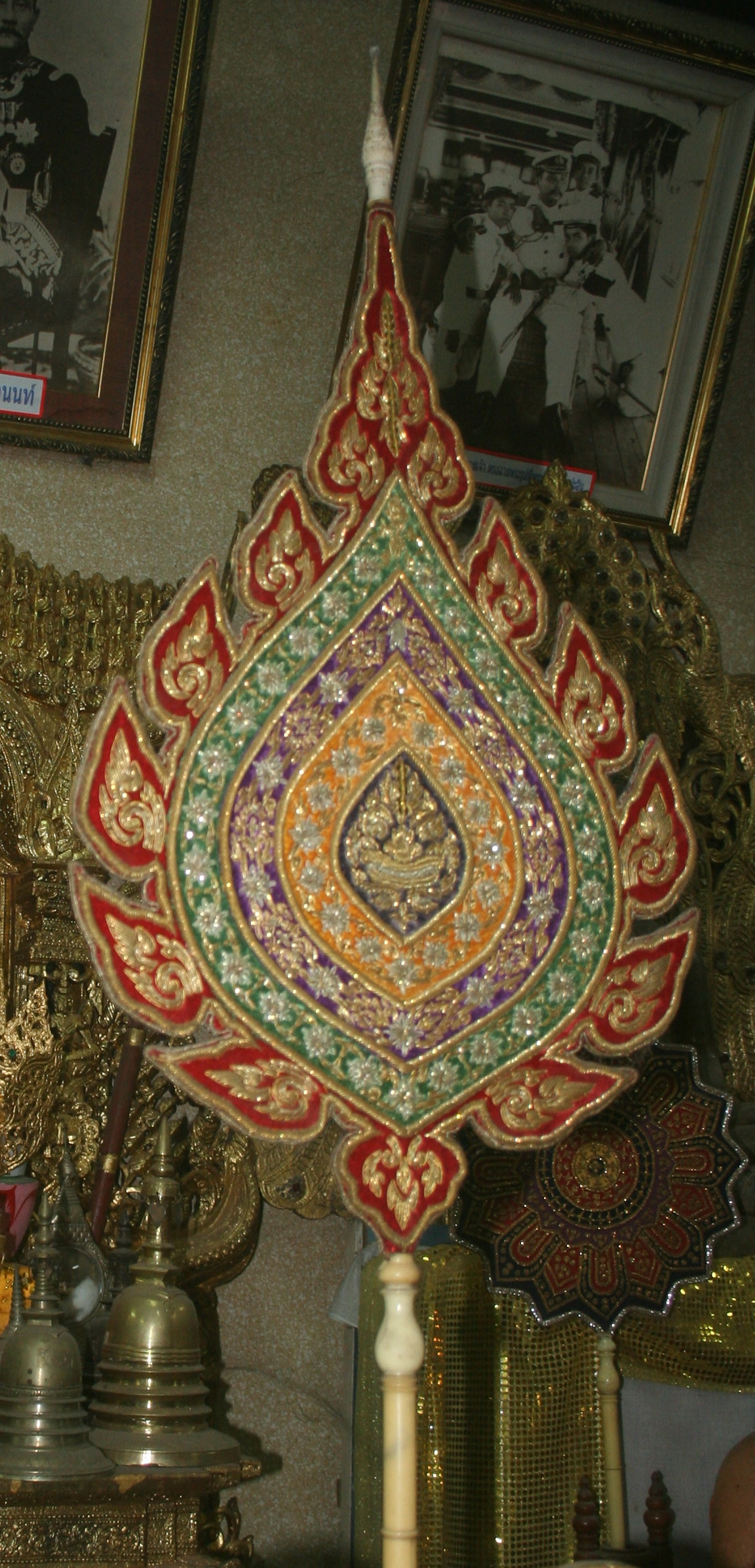
Thai Buddhist monk's fan of rank

Prince Narisara Nuwattiwong wrote that Lingat was infatuated with Buddhist fans of rank and had at his home in Bangkok a large number of fans of rank of Thai high-ranking monks, the sources of which Lingat refused to reveal.

== See also ==
- Hindu Law
- Classical Hindu law
- Classical Hindu law in practice
- Dhammasattha
- Law of Thailand
- Legal realism
- Penal Code of India
- Rta
