= Indian Summer School =

British television series

- Title card of the programme showing British boys at The Doon School
- Genre: Documentary
- Directed by: Andrew Parkin
- Presented by: Eddie Marsan
- Theme music composer: Indian Summer by Jai Wolf
- Country of origin: United Kingdom
- Original language: English
- No. of seasons: 1
- No. of episodes: 3

Production
- Executive producers: Tom O'Brien, Simon Andreae
- Running time: 138 minutes
- Production company: Naked

Original release
- Network: Channel 4
- Release: 29 March – 12 April 2018

Indian Summer School is a 2018 Channel 4 docuseries in which five British boys, who have failed their GCSEs, are invited to attend the Indian all-boys boarding school The Doon School, described in the show as the "Eton of India" (though the school eschews the label). The three-part miniseries was produced by Naked Entertainment, and originally aired in March–April 2018 on Channel 4.

== Episodes ==
In the show, five working class boys, Jack, Alfie, Jake, Ethan and Harry, are given a chance to reform their academic performance, based on the premise that an all-round education in an ethnically-diverse environment at one of the world's best schools will prove beneficial. Matthew Raggett, the school's headmaster, believes the boys' lives can be turned around in six months at the school, which has the exam pass rate of 100%.

No.	Title	Original release date
1	"Arrival"	29 March 2018
As the boys arrive at the Eton of India, Jack and Alfie adapt best, while Harry slips into old habits. Having not been in school for two years, Jake and Ethan find it hard to adjust to the new regime.
2	"A Fight and a Punishment"	5 April 2018
The five boys are six weeks into their studies at India's Doon School and progress is patchy. While Harry gets into a fight, Jake locks horns with the headmaster, with drastic results.
3	"Exams and Newspapers"	12 April 2018
After three months in India, all the boys are missing home. Ethan ruffles a few feathers when he writes an article for the school newspaper The Doon School Weekly on being the first `out' gay boy at Doon. Jack goes on a trek into the Himalayas - a trip designed to build his confidence. As the end of term approaches, the boys retake their GCSEs.
