= Hindu titles of law =

Hindu legal system

In the Dharmaśāstras and Hindu law, more generally, there are usually eighteen titles of law. The titles of law make up the grounds for litigation and the performance of the legal process, usually by the king and his Brahmin counselors. The eighteen titles of law according to Manu are: "(i) the first is the non-payment of debts; (ii) deposits; (iii) sale without ownership; (iv) partnerships; (v) delivery and non-delivery of gifts; (vi) non-payment of wages; (vii) breach of contract; (viii) cancellation of a sale or purchase; (ix) disputes between owners and herdsman; (x) the Law on boundary disputes; (xi) verbal assault; (xii) physical assault; (xiii) theft; (xiv) violence; (xv) sexual crimes against women; (xvi) Law concerning husband and wife; (xvii) partition of inheritance; and (xviii) gambling and betting." These reasons vary slightly among authors, and many of them are covered more in depth.

== 18 Titles of law ==
=== Non-payment of debts ===
Concerning the eighteen titles of law, the non-payment of debt is almost always listed first. According to Davis this is because, "A very old practice of textual organization within Dharmaśāstra and other textual genres of Sanskrit calls the first procedure or topic to be described the archetype (prakrti) and the subsequent procedures or topics the ectypes (vikrti). We saw this practice in the placement of the Brahmin as the archetype as a matter of textual concision. The Non-payment of Debts is the archetype for the other titles of law, not only because its description overlaps with and in some respects encompasses the contents of the other titles but also because debt as its thematic content pervades the subsequent titles. In terms of overlap, questions about witness, autonomy, competence, documentation, and contractual securities are all assumed in and carry over to discussions of the later titles."

=== Deposits ===
The Sanskrit word for deposits is Nikșepa, the words upanidhi and nyāsa are synonyms. Manu VIII 179 holds that deposits should be entrusted to those who have good dharma. The person who holds the deposit typically does not receive any person benefit from doing so. The misappropriation or misplacement of a deposit due to negligence is regarded as very sinful. "The idea is that no one is bound to accept a deposit, but when a person accepts it, his primary duty is to preserve it with care and the next duty is to return it at the time agreed or on demand. The obligation arises from the trust reposed in a person."

=== Sale without ownership ===
Dattāpradänika is concerned with the resumption of a gift. The Nārada-Smṛti "defines it as that title where a man desires to resume what has been given by him because it has been improperly given by him". In the History of the Dharmaśāstras Vol. III, P.V. Kane states, "According to the Nārada-Smṛti VII. 1 and the Smṛti of Bṛhaspati when a person, who holds an open deposit, a sealed deposit, an article bailed for delivery to another, stolen property, an article borrowed for some festival, a pledge, or property lost by a stranger and found (by him), sells it in secret (or behind the back of the owner) it is to be considered as a sale by one who is not the rightful owner." That which may be given must be absolutely one's own with the exception of things that are required for the maintenance of one's family.

==== Types of sale without ownership ====
A sale by a non-owner is known as asvāmi-vikraya. There are two different types of sales without ownership: pratipanna-asvāmi-vikrayah and apratipanna-asvāmi vikrayah. The first, pratipanna-asvāmi-vikrayah, occurs when the unauthorized possessor admits to being a non-owner. The second, apratipanna-asvāmi vikrayah occurs when the possessor does not admit to being a non-owner. The first types of sale is resolved without dispute because the possessor returns the possession to the rightful owner. The second type of sale results in a case because the possessor, although not the true owner, has sold, given, or pledged the property to a third party. In the case of the second type of sale "the entire process of the court has to be gone through with both parties leading evidence to buttress their respective claims, and the court then giving its judgement." It is seen as important that there is a first category of sale without ownership because it hints at how "the state was involved in the settlement of people's disputes at an informal level."

==== Liability of an innocent buyer ====
An innocent buyer is regarded as one who does not know that what he has purchased was sold by someone without ownership. Śambhu, who heavily relies on Manu and Marīci, holds that "a buyer who makes his purchase from the open market, and in the full knowledge of king's men will get a clear title to the goods so purchased irrespective of the bona fides of the seller." Devaņa refutes this and goes so far as to say that "not even a hundred citations of rules can confer ownership rights upon the buyer who buys from a non-owner. Devaņa agrees with Śambhu only insofar as the true owner fails to identify his property.

=== Partnerships ===
Partnerships in Hindu law are any venture that results in two or more people working together. The śāstras have a lot to say about the different kinds of partnerships, whom one should enter into a partnership with, and rules for governing partnerships with respect to profits, losses, and quarrels among partners. For example, the Smṛti of Bṛhaspati states regarding potential partners, "that a man should carry on a joint business with other persons of good family, that are clever, active, intelligent (or educated), familiar with cons, skilled in controlling (expenditure) and income, honest and valiant (or enterprising) and that joint undertakings like trade should not be carried on by prudent men with persons (partners) who are weak or lazy or afflicted with disease or are unlucky or destitute (of money)." Kane states, "It is interesting to note that the ancient Dharmasutras of Gautama, Āpastamba and Baudhāyana are silent about partnerships, and that Manu lay down rules about the distribution of fees among the priests at a sacrifice ad that in one verse he remarks that the same principles are to be applied in all matters where men work conjointly."

=== Delivery and non-delivery of gifts ===
Non-delivery or resumption of gift is referred to as "dattanapakarma" in the smṛtis. The Nārada-Smṛti divides the title into four categories, "what may be given, what may not be given, what are valid gifts, and what are invalid gifts." The Smṛti of Kātyāna as reconstructed by P.V. Kane, is useful in elaborating and giving insight to this title of law. It states regarding invalid gifts, "These cannot be given either because they are not one's absolute property or because the gift of them is forbidden by the sages. In the case of even those who hold that one has ownership over one's son or wife, the gift of them is not possible because it is forbidden, just as though one owns rice, yavas and masa beans, one cannot make offerings of masa because the veda prohibits their use."

=== Non-payment of wages ===
Vetana-Anapākarma is the Sanskrit word for the non payment of wages. The early smŗtis concern themselves in large part with the payment of wages to workers. The Bŗhaspati is popularly cited by many medieval authors asserting that "a worker shall not do even the slightest mischief to the master; if he does he loses his wages and proceedings (vāda) begin." Mathur contends that "Devaņa has made it clear that this verse has reference to proceedings in a court. He says that when a worker is defeated he loses his wages in proportion to the damage caused to his master." Devaņa switches the order in which litigation and losing wages occurs.

=== Breach of contract ===
The law of contracts is hugely concerned with the contract of debt, of pledge or mortgage, of bailments, of sale, of partnership, and of hire and service. The law of contracts is not found in one place. The dharmaśāstras do not lay down a general code of rules applicable to all transfers of immovable property, nor do they treat of transfers by way of sale, mortgage or gift in separate sections." Ancient writers largely commented on who was competent to enter into transactions. Those who are "dependent, minors, extremely old, charged with grave sins, devoid of a limb, and those that are addicted to vices" are considered incompetent and agreements with these people are invalid. Kauțilya holds that any contract made under the influence of intoxicants or wrath are invalid as well as those made when a person is distressed or has an unsound mind. Manu reinforces this by stating that all contracts entered into by force are invalid. Contracts that are contrary to the kings orders are regarded as invalid. According to Devaņa the king has the power to outlaw any agreements that are against śruti and smŗti or tainted by greed.

=== Cancellation of a sale or purchase ===
The Manusmṛti deals with the cancellation of a sale or purchase. "The principle rule is that the buyer or the seller may rescind the deal within ten days if he feels dissatisfied. But anyone forcing the other party to rescind it shall be punished." The Mitākșarā identifies the liability of the seller in case of a cancellation of a sale by the seller dependent on whether there is a price difference in a product. "When the price goes down the seller will have to compensate the buyer as prescribed by Nārada; where the price rises, and the buyer is likely to earn an extra profit, the liability of the seller is not extinguished, and he has to pay the buyer the value of the benefit, or the usufruct as the case may be. However, if the price remains unchanged the seller still has to pay interest at the rate of five percent per annum on the amount paid by the buyer."

=== Disputes between owners and herdsman ===
In ancient times India was a predominately agricultural society and therefore Svāmipālavivāda was a major basis of litigation. Svāmipālavivāda is the Sanskrit word that refers to the disputes between the owner of cattle and the herdsman who tends to them. According to P.V. Kane "during the day the responsibility for the safety of the cattle rests on the herdsman and during the night on the owner provided they are in the latter's house." The herdsman is liable for cattle if he does not attempt to save them or if he neglects them. Kane also states that "it is the duty of the cowherd to struggle as much as in him lies to protect the cows from accidents and if he is unable to do so he must quickly inform the owner." If a herdsman does not struggle to save the or protect the animals he is responsible for making good the value of the animals lost and for paying a fine of 12 ½ panas to the king. The herdsman is also responsible if the animal dies or is lost by theft. However, if after the theft of an animal the herdsman immediately notifies the owner he is not responsible. The herdsman's responsibility is also voided if he is seized, the village is attacked, or the country is invaded.

=== Boundary disputes ===
Boundary disputes are called "ksetrajavivāda", or disputes relating to fields. In the Dharmaśāstras the section titled Sima Vivadah deals with the determination of boundaries of fields, homes and villages. The Nāradasmṛti defines boundary disputes as, "dispute with regard to land in which questions about dikes or embankments, the boundaries of fields, ploughed land and fallow land.". There are six causes of boundary dispute in most of the sastras, and the Smṛti of Kātyāna states them as: "claiming more land, claim that a person is entitled to less than he possesses, claim to a share, denial of a share, seizing possession when previously there was none, and boundary."

=== Verbal assault ===
P.V. Kane states, "Vākpārusya, daṇḍapārusya, steya, strisangrahana, and sahāsa are five titles out of 18 that are concerned with what may be called criminal matters or crimes in modern nomenclature." They represent, respectively, abuse and defamation, assault, theft, adultery or unlawful intercourse with a woman, and violence.

The Nāradasmṛti says vākpārusya is defined as, "abusive words that loudly proclaim censure of another's country, caste, family and the like and that cause mental pain or offence to that man." The Nāradasmṛti further defines three kinds of defamation, "niṣṭhura (reproachful such as calling a man a fool or a rogue), aślīla (obscene or insulting), and tīvra (mercilessly severe such as charging a man with such grave sins as brahmāna-murder or drinking liquor) and that each punishment for each later one is more severe that for each preceding one."

=== Physical assault ===
To define Daṇḍapārusya, or assault, the Kauṭilya's Arthaśāstra begins by saying assault, "comprises touching, threatening to strike and actually striking another." Going slightly further, "The Nārada-Smṛti XVIII. 4–6 defines it as injuring the limbs of another with the hand, foot, weapon or other means (such as stones) or defiling or causing pain by (bringing) ashes and similar substances in contact with another…assault may be one of three kinds viz. mild, middling and highly punishable." It is even explained in the Yājñavalkyasmṛti that causing injury to animals and trees would fall under this category. Manu contends that the punishment should be commensurate with that of the harm caused to the victim.

=== Theft ===
Theft, or streya, is defined by the Kauṭilya's Arthaśāstra as "depriving a man of his wealth either clandestinely or openly and either by night or by day." The Nārada-Smṛti defines theft as, "derivation of wealth by various means from people that are asleep, careless or intoxicated." Like assault, there are varying degrees of theft depending on what was stolen. The three kinds are: "trifling (when earthen-ware, seats, cots, wood, hides, grass, beans in pods or cooked food is stolen), middling (when the theft relates to clothes except silken ones, animals except cows and bulls, metals except gold, rice and barley), and grave or high (when gold jewels, silken cloth, women, men, cattle, elephants, horses, and the wealth of brāhmanas or temples is stolen)." There are several texts that agree on the definition of a thief including the Manu-Smṛti, Nārada-Smṛti, and the Smṛti of Bṛhaspati. Their definition contends that, "thieves are traders who employ false weights and balances, gamblers, quacks, bribers of sabhyas, prostitutes, those who profess to arbitrate, those who manufacture imitation articles, those who subsist by prognosticating good fortune or portents or by magic or palmistry, false witnesses, etc."

=== Sexual crimes against women ===
Vas. 28. 2-3 states that, "when a woman is polluted by being raped or kidnapped by a thief, she should not be abandoned; one should wait till her monthly illness (making her undergo certain expiations till then) and she becomes pure after it." The Matsyapurāņa liberally states that a woman who is raped is innocent while a man who commits rape should be put to death. Other texts are harsher, such as those of the late smŗti writer Devala, that states that women who are raped and conceive may not be restored to social intercourse even after undergoing expiation.

=== Partition of inheritance ===
The Āpastamba principle holds that after the death of one property owner the other is entitled to the property. After the death of a husband a wife succeeds all of the husband's estate without allotting any shares for their sons. Upon the death of both parents sons are to divide ancestral estate and paternal debt equally. Partitioning during a mother's lifetime is only allowed with the mother's consent. "Traces of this rule are to be found even in IX-104 of the Manu Smrti which can be literally rendered as: brothers may take equally the ancestral wealth after the mother and the father; they have no competence so long as the mother and the father are alive"

=== Gambling and betting ===
Dyũta samāhvaya, known as 'gambling and betting games,' is a traditional title of dispute first present in the earlier smŗtis with little change in the post smŗti period. The Mitāksarā is one of the only texts that presents a change, defining gambling as "any transaction involving betting with stake money" thus expanding the definition beyond games like dice and cockfighting. According to Mathur, Manu's categorical command to the kings to completely prohibit all gambling influences many texts like the Vyavahāra Nirņaya and the Smŗti Candrikā. These texts reflect no desirability in having any law allowing gambling. However, there are other texts like the Bŗhaspati that find gambling law to be beneficial for purposes of taxation and to provide ease in the search for criminals.

== See also ==
- Classical Hindu law
- Classical Hindu law in practice
- Hindu Law
- Hinduism
- Monarchy in Ancient India
- Nāradasmṛti
- Vyavahāra
