= J. Duncan M. Derrett =

John Duncan Martin Derrett (30 August 1922 – 21 October 2012) was Professor of Oriental Laws in the University of London, from 1965 to 1982, and afterwards Emeritus Professor.

Derrett was educated at Emanuel School, London, Jesus College, Oxford and the School of Oriental and African Studies, London and was called to the bar by Gray's Inn in 1953. He is the author of a number of works on law and the history of systems of law, India, religion (particularly Christianity) and comparative religion, latterly particularly of comparisons of Christianity with Buddhism. Derrett has also translated works by others into English.

Derrett appeared briefly in Dr Robert Beckford's television documentary The Hidden Story of Jesus (premiered on Channel 4 on 25 December 2007) discussing similarities between some Christian and Buddhist teachings and possible historical reasons for those similarities. With his "A Blemmya in India" (Numen Vol. 49, No. 4 (2002), pp. 460–474) Dr. Derrett argued that the "Blemmiya" were Africans, and Buddhists, in India.

== Books ==
- The Hoysalas (1957)
- Introduction to Modern Hindu Law (1963)
- Studies in the Laws of Succession in Nigeria (1965)
- Oriental Lawyer Looks at the Trial of Jesus and the Doctrine of the Redemption (Inaugural Lectures) (1966)
- An introduction to legal systems (1968)
- Religion, Law and the State in India (Law in India) (1968, 1999)
- Law in the New Testament (1970)
- Jesus' Audience: The social and psychological environment in which He worked; prolegomena to a restatement of the teaching of Jesus. Lectures at Newquay (1972)
- Henry Swinburne (? 1551–1624), Civil Lawyer of York (Borthwick Papers) (1973)
- Dharmasastra and juridical literature (A History of Indian literature. Vol. 4, Scientific and technical literature) (1973)
- Essays in Classical and Modern Hindu Law: Dharmasastra and Related Ideas v. 1 (Asian Studies) (1976)
- Studies in the New Testament: Glimpses of the Legal and Social Presuppositions of the Authors v. 1 (1977)
- Essays in Classical and Modern Hindu Law: Consequences of the Intellectual Exchange with the Foreign Powers (1977)
- Essays in Classical and Modern Hindu Law: Anglo-Hindu Legal Problems (1977)
- Essays in Classical and Modern Hindu Law: Current Problems and the Legacy of the Past (1978)
- Studies in the New Testament: Midrash in Action and as a Literary Device v. 2 (1978)
- Beiträge zu indischem Rechtsdenken (Studien zu nichteuropäischen Rechtstheorien) (1979)
- Dr. St. John: A civil lawyer in the Indies (1980)
- Anastasis, The: Resurrection of Jesus as an Historical Event (1982)
- Making of Mark: Scriptural Bases of the Earliest Gospel (1985)
- Studies in the New Testament: Midrash, Haggadah and the Character of the Community v. 3 (1985)
- Studies in the New Testament: Midrash, the Composition of Gospels and Discipline v. 4 (Biblical Studies) (1986)
- New Resolutions of Old Conundrums: Fresh Insight into Luke's Gospel (1987)
- Studies in the New Testament: The Sea-change of the Old Testament in the New v. 5 (Studies in the New Testament) (1989)
- The Ascetic Discourse: An Explanation of the Sermon on the Mount (1989)
- The Victim : The Johannine Passion Narrative Reexamined (1993)
- Sermon on the Mount: A Manual for Living (1994)
- Prophecy in the Cotswolds 1803–1947: Joanna Southcott and Spiritual Reform (1994)
- Studies in Hindu law: Law and religion in ancient India : family law in ancient India (with an account of modern developments) (Pubblicazioni di "Indologica taurienensia" : collana di letture) (1994)
- Studies in the New Testament: Jesus Among Biblical Exegetes v. 6 (Studies in the New Testament) (1995)
- Two Masters: Buddha and Jesus (1995)
- Some Telltale Words in the New Testament (1997)
- Law and Morality (1998)
- The Bible and the Buddhists (Bibbia e Oriente. Supplementum) (2000)

== Translations ==
- The Classical Law of India by Robert Lingat (1967, in French), English translation by J Duncan M Derrett (1973)

== Reviews ==
- Review of S. Srikanta Sastri's "Early Gangas of Talakad (1952)" in Journal of the Royal Asiatic Society of Great Britain & Ireland, July 1953
