= B. G. Verghese =

Indian journalist

- Born: 21 June 1926; Maymyo, Burma
- Died: 30 December 2014 (aged 88); New Delhi, India
- Education: The Doon School; University of Cambridge
- Occupations: Journalist, former editor for Hindustan Times

Boobli George Verghese (21 June 1927 – 30 December 2014) was a senior Indian journalist. He was editor of leading newspapers the Hindustan Times (1969–75) and The Indian Express (1982–86). In 1975, he received the Ramon Magsaysay award for outstanding contribution to journalism. After 1986, he was associated with the New Delhi think-tank Centre for Policy Research.

== Early life ==
Verghese attended The Doon School. He then studied Economics at St. Stephen's College, Delhi and pursued a master's degree from Trinity College, Cambridge. While at Doon, Verghese edited The Doon School Weekly.

== Career ==
Verghese started his journalistic career in The Times of India. He was information adviser to Prime Minister Indira Gandhi in 1966-69, and wrote her speeches. Subsequently, he joined Hindustan Times as editor, but lost his post for criticising Indira Gandhi during the Emergency. His integrity in those years earned him immense respect, and he was awarded the Ramon Magsaysay award that year. Immediately afterwards, he contested Lok Sabha elections in 1977 from Mavelikkara in Kerala but lost.

Verghese was also a member of the Kargil Review Committee following the Kargil War. He was also a member of the National Security Council Advisory Board.

A crusader for civil rights, Verghese has long worked on problems of development. He was also on the Editors Guild of India Fact Finding Mission after the Gujarat riots, 2002.

He wrote extensively on developmental issues. Waters of hope (1990) and Winning the Future (1994) discuss managing the Himalayan watershed. Design for tomorrow (1965), India's North East resurgent and Reorienting India: Rage, reconciliation and security (2008) are other books with a progressive theme. He also authored Warrior of the Fourth Estate (2005), an acclaimed biography of Ramnath Goenka, owner of the Indian Express. In October 2010, he published his autobiography First Draft: Witness to Making of Modern India, which discusses the steady degradation of democratic processes during the tenures of Indira Gandhi and her son Rajiv.
