= Ambika Prasad Bajpai =

Indian writer and news editor (1880–1968)

- Born: 1880; Kanpur
- Died: 21 March 1968 (aged 87–88)
- Occupations: Writer, News editor, Scholar
- Known for: Journalism
- Notable work: Hindi Kaumudi
- Office: Member of Uttar Pradesh Legislative Council
- Awards: Sahitya Vachaspati by Hindi Sahitya Sammelan

Ambika Prasad Bajpai (also spelled Ambika Prasad Vajpayee; Hindi: अंबिका प्रसाद बाजपेयी) was an Indian writer, news editor, and scholar. He was born on 30 December 1880 in Kanpur, Uttar Pradesh to Kandarpnarayan Vajpeyee. He received his early education in Kanpur. He was the editor of the newspapers Hindi Bangvasi and Bharatmitra, published in Calcutta from 1911 to 1919. He also later edited Swatantra from 1920 to 1930.

Between 1904 and 1919, he studied grammar and wrote a book titled Hindi Kaumudi. One of his well-known essays, Persian Influence on Hindi, is widely recognized. In recognition of his service to Hindi, editorial skills, and scholarship, the Hindi Sahitya Sammelan in Kashi appointed him as its president. He also served as the member of the Uttar Pradesh Legislative Council.

In 1916, he established branches of the Tilak Home Rule League and Swarajya Sangh in Calcutta. He raised funds and organised public meetings to support Bal Gangadhar Tilak. With Bipin Chandra Pal, he also led the Swarajya movement in the city and, in 1917, was elected Vice President of the Calcutta Congress Reception Committee. He was associated with the All India Congress Committee for several years and served as Vice President of the Tilak Swarajya Sangh.

During the Non-Cooperation Movement of 1921, he was arrested along with Chittaranjan Das, Maulana Abul Kalam Azad, and Subhas Chandra Bose, and imprisoned in Presidency Jail and later in Central Jail. He also presided over sessions of the Nagpur Sammelan (1913) and the Kayastha Sammelan in Kanpur (1930).

In 1928, he was appointed as an examiner for the Hindi matriculation examination at the University of Calcutta, and by 1930, he was also serving as an examiner for the Intermediate (I.A.) and Master of Arts (M.A.) level examinations. In 1931, he presided over the 26th session of the Hindi Sahitya Sammelan held in Kashi. In 1944, he served as the President of the All India Journalists' Conference held in Kanpur.

He was honored with the title of Sahitya Vachaspati by the Hindi Sahitya Sammelan. He died on 21 March 1968 in Lucknow.

== Notable books ==
- Hindi Kaumudi
- Hindi Par Farsi Ka Prabhav
- Abhinav Hindi Vyakaran
- Shiksha
- Hindustani Ki Rajya Kalpana
- Samaachar Pat Kala, and others.
