= Ananya Vajpeyi =

Indian academic and writer

Ananya Vajpeyi is an Indian academic and writer. She is Fellow at the Centre for the Study of Developing Societies. She is the author of the book "Righteous Republic: The Political foundations of Modern India" published by the Harvard University Press. Born in 1972.

== Life and career ==
Vajpeyi is the daughter of Sahitya Akademi poet Kailash Vajpeyi.

Vajpeyi received her MA at the Jawaharlal Nehru University, M.Phil. from the University of Oxford as a Rhodes Scholar, and Ph.D. at the University of Chicago. She has taught at the University of Massachusetts and Columbia University. She is currently a visiting professor at Ashoka University.

== Works ==
Her book "Righteous Republic" won the Crossword Award for Non-Fiction (2013), jointly with "From the Ruins of Empire" by Pankaj Mishra. It also won the Thomas J Wilson Memorial Prize from Harvard University Press and the Tata First Book Award for Non-Fiction (2013). It was also featured on the Books of the year 2012 list on The Guardian and The New Republic.

She is the co-editor with Ramin Jahanbegloo of Ashis Nandy: A Life in Dissent (OUP, 2018) and with Volker Kaul of Minorities and Populism: Critical Perspectives from South Asia and Europe (Springer, 2020).

She writes regularly for The Hindu newspaper and Scroll.in. She has conceived, commissioned and guest edited several issues of Seminar magazine.

== See also ==
- Sheldon Pollock
- B. R. Ambedkar
- Hindutva
