= Bhagwati Dhar Vajpayee =

Indian journalist (1924/1925–2021)

- Born: 1924 or 1925
- Died: 6 May 2021 (aged 96)
- Occupations: Journalist, founder & editor-in-chief of Yuga Dharma
- Years active: 1952—1990
- Awards: Manikchandra Vajpayee National Journalism Award (2006)

Bhagwati Dhar Vajpayee (1924/1925 – 6 May 2021) was an Indian journalist. He was the founder and editor-in-chief of Yuga Dharma, a Hindi daily newspaper. In 2006, he was awarded the Manikchandra Vajpayee National Journalism Award by the Government of Madhya Pradesh. The award was presented by the Public Relations Minister and Chhattisgarh Culture Minister Brijmohan Agrawal.

He started his career in journalism with former Prime Minister Atal Bihari Vajpayee and Pandit Deendayal Upadhyaya in Lucknow in the 1950s. He joined Swadesh in 1952. From 1957 to 1990, he was associated with Yuga Dharma and worked as an editor-in-chief of the news publication. He also served as the president of the District Journalist Association, Jabalpur and Mahakoshal Chamber Of Commerce And Industries.

At the age of 96, he died of a heart attack on May 6, 2021. The Chief Minister Shivraj Singh Chauhan and Director General of the Indian Institute of Mass Communication, Sanjay Dwivedi, expressed deep grief on his death.
