= Matthew Raggett =

British academic and private educator

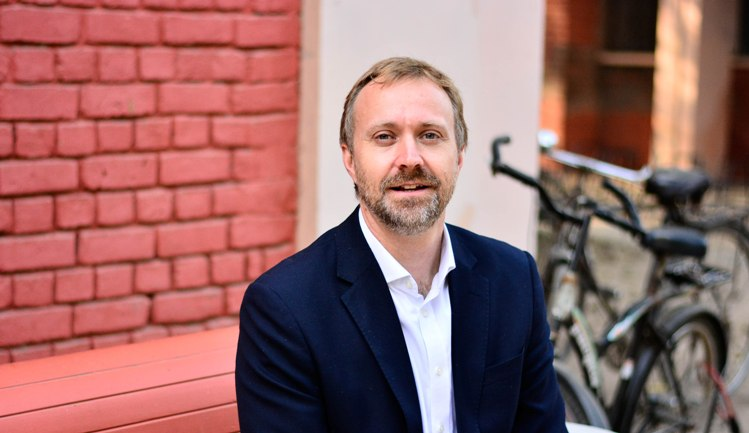
- Raggett at the IIT Delhi Dec 2017
- Born: 1972 (age 53–54); Bristol
- Education: Newcastle University (BSc); University of Worcester (PGCE); Charles Sturt University (MBA)
- Occupations: Academic, writer, former headmaster of The Doon School
- Spouse: Lindsay Raggett
- Children: 3
- Writing career
- Subjects: Mathematics, Theoretical Physics, Philosophy of Education
- Website: Official website

Matthew Jonathan Raggett (born 1972) is a British educator, writer and the former Headmaster of The Doon School, the all-boys boarding school in Dehradun, India. He succeeded Peter McLaughlin in 2016, becoming the tenth headmaster of the school. Raggett left Doon in January 2020 and returned to Germany. He was the fourth Englishman in Doon's history to head the school and was a member of The Headmasters' and Headmistresses' Conference, UK. Jagpreet Singh succeeded him as headmaster, and joined the school in June 2020. He is currently the Director of the Thuringia International School (ThIS), Weimar, DE.

== Education ==
Raggett went to the University of Newcastle and received a BSc in Physics and Applied Maths, a PGCE from the University of Worcester and then an MBA from Charles Sturt University in Australia.

== Career ==
Raggett was the Secondary Principal of Leipzig International School from 2009 – 2016. He then joined the Doon School, succeeding Peter McLaughlin as the tenth Headmaster of the all-boys Round Square school in Dehradun. In April 2018, he featured prominently in Indian Summer School, a Channel 4 documentary and educational experiment in which five working class British boys spent a six months in Doon with the purpose of improving their grades.

He wrote Your Child's First Steps Towards Success and How Your Child Can Win in Life both published by Juggernaut Books in 2019. In January 2020, he stepped down as the tenth headmaster of Doon, citing the need to return to Germany to be closer to his daughter and wife. Raggett leads an educational consultancy, MR Ed Partners, based in Leipzig, Germany, which helps global institutions improve their pedagogical practices in various ways, including better design and architecture. MR Ed Partners started working with VITALIS European Projects in 2020 to develop their offerings for students and teachers coming to Germany through the Erasmus programme. Raggett served as the Director of Education for VITALIS European Projects from 2021 to 2023.

Raggett is a member of the GRJ Education team, having met Gareth Johnson, when they were both speaking at the 2019 EduExcellence conference at IIT Delhi.

Raggett is also working with the EdTech company Dextres in India as a member of their School Success Team. Since July 2024, he has been working with Sparkl Edventure as the Chair of their Academic Council.

In July 2023 Raggett became the Director of the Thuringia International School (ThIS), Weimar, DE.

== Bibliography ==
- How Your Child Can Win in Life (2019), Juggernaut Books, ISBN 978-9353450342

Academic offices
Preceded by Peter McLaughlin	Headmaster of The Doon School; 2016–2020	Succeeded by Jagpreet Singh
