= Vikram Chandra (journalist) =

Indian businessman and journalist

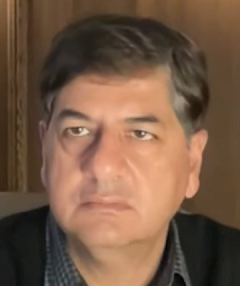
- Chandra in 2022
- Born: Vikramaditya A. Chandra; 7 January 1967 (age 59); Delhi, India
- Other name: Vikramaditya Chandra
- Education: University of Delhi; Oxford University
- Occupations: Journalist; Founder; Editorji Technologies
- Spouse: Seema Chandra

Vikram Chandra (born 7 January 1967) is an Indian journalist, who founded Editorji Technologies, a multilingual video news platform. Chandra setup Editorji in October 2018, positioning it as a disruptive offering in the digital news space.

While HT Media and Bharti Airtel were among the early investors in editorji, in July 2020, the RP-Sanjiv Goenka (RPSG) Group acquired 51 percent stake.

At editorji, Chandra hosts some of its flagship programmes, including The India Story, a weekly show that offers in-depth analysis on the big newsmakers from India. The 2021 Assembly Elections and the Covid-19 pandemic are some of the top stories that have been covered.

Prior to Editorji, Chandra was the CEO of NDTV Group from 2011 to October 2016. He is considered among the leading journalists in India today. Chandra's reputation as a journalist was built while covering the Kashmir conflict. He is the former anchor for the Nine O'Clock News and was, until recently, host of Gadget Guru and anchor of The Big Fight.

Currently Vikram Chandra is the Founder & Managing Director of Editorji Technologies.

== Early life and career ==
Chandra is the son of IAS officer Mr. Yogesh Chandra and his wife Nandini Chandra, a journalist with The Hindustan Times. He is an alumnus of The Doon School, where he was the editor of The Doon School Weekly. After his schooling, Chandra attended St. Stephen's College, Delhi and received a bachelor's degree in Economics. He later studied at Oxford on an Inlaks Scholarship. He has also done a three-month course in mass media at Stanford University. He is married to Seema Chandra.

Chandra began his career in television journalism in 1991 working with a TV news magazine called Newstrack. He has been with New Delhi Television Limited since 1994. During these years, he worked on the prime time 9 O'Clock News, Gadget Guru (with Rajiv Makhni), which was a review show about new technologies. He is best known for his award-winning anchor position on The Big Fight, which is one of India's top rated talk and current affairs shows.

In 2000 Chandra was instrumental in setting up NDTV.com, which became one of the top websites in the country. In 2007, he was named CEO of NDTV Networks, and in 2011 he was named as the CEO of the NDTV group. He resigned from NDTV in 2016 to found 'editorji' and was replaced as NDTV CEO by K V L Narayan Rao who had already had one stint as NDTV's CEO in the past. In August 2019, he was named in a FIR along with the NDTV co-founders Prannoy Roy and Radhika Roy, for alleged FDI norms violation by the CBI. NDTV called the FIR an act of vendetta against the free press, and Chandra said he seemed to have been named by mistake. Separately, Chandra was fined ₹6,67,000 by SEBI in November 2020, and was barred from the securities market, along with some other NDTV employees. He appealed the order in SAT, which stayed the SEBI order in December.

Chandra's first work of fiction, the thriller The Srinagar Conspiracy, was published in 2000 and became a best seller. Chandra received acclaim for his familiarity with Kashmir, where the book is set, and his use of the English language.

== Notable assignments ==
As a reporter, Chandra was assigned to Kashmir, where he reported on war and conflict. Chandra had an exclusive footage of the army camps at the Saltoro Heights in Siachen.

As the anchor of The Big Fight (NDTV), Chandra has interviewed King Abdullah of Saudi Arabia in 2006, Bill Gates in 2012, Shimon Peres, and Rupert Murdoch. He also interviewed Tim Cook, the CEO of Apple Inc. in May 2016, during the latter's visit to India. In 2018, he interviewed former U.S. Vice-President Al Gore during the World Economic Forum in Davos.

Chandra has been active in public interest media campaigns in India. He has worked on several "Greenathons," which is a media campaign to expand the electrical system to rural areas and finance solar lanterns to bring light to homes. He has also been active in the "Save our Tigers" campaign to stop poaching. He is also very popular among scholars for his significant contribution to various social and political themes.

== Awards ==
In 2007, Chandra received the designation "Global Leader for Tomorrow" from the World Economic Forum in Davos when he was selected as a "Young Global Leader." He has twice won the Hero Honda Indian Television Academy Award for Best Anchor for a Talk Show for The Big Fight in 2005 and 2008 and the Teacher's Achievement Award for Communication, amongst other coveted recognitions.
