= Nikhil Deogun =

Indian-American journalist

- Born: Assam, India
- Education: The Doon School; Muskingum University; University of Missouri
- Occupation: Journalist
- Years active: 1993–present
- Known for: Managing editor, CNBC; Deputy managing editor, The Wall Street Journal

Nikhil "Nik" Deogun is an Indian-born American journalist, and the former managing editor of CNBC. Prior to joining CNBC in 2010, Deogun was the deputy managing editor at The Wall Street Journal.

== Education ==
Deogun was born in Assam, India, and completed his schooling at The Doon School in Dehradun. After leaving Doon in 1987, he went to Muskingum University for a bachelor's degree in economics and English, followed by a master's degree in journalism from University of Missouri, graduating in 1993.

== Career ==
In 1994, Deogun got his first job as a staff reporter at the Atlanta bureau of The Wall Street Journal, and then moved to the paper's New York City bureau in 1999. He remained at WSJ for 15 years and later became the paper's deputy managing editor. In 2010, he joined CNBC as editor-in-chief of business news programming, and a year later was appointed the senior vice president of the channel. In October 2018, Deogun left CNBC to become the CEO of the Americas at Brunswick Group, a corporate advisory firm.
