= Girija Shankar Bajpai =

Indian civil servant and diplomat

Sir Girija Shankar Bajpai KCSI KBE CIE
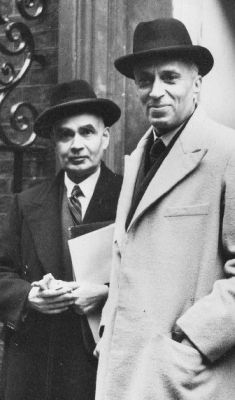
- Girja Shankar Bajpai with the Prime Minister Jawaharlal Nehru in the first Commonwealth Prime Ministers conference in 1948 in London.

1st Secretary,Ministry of External Affairs
- In office 1947–1952
- Prime Minister: Jawaharlal Nehru
- Preceded by: position established
- Succeeded by: N. R. Pillai

Personal details
- Born: 3 April 1891 Allahabad, North-Western Provinces, British India (now in Uttar Pradesh, India)
- Died: 5 December 1954 (aged 63) Bombay, Bombay State, India (now Mumbai, Maharashtra)
- Children: 7 (4 daughters; 3 sons), including Uma Shankar Bajpai and Katyayani Shankar Bajpai
- Education: University of Allahabad, Merton College, Oxford

Sir Girija Shankar Bajpai KCSI KBE CIE (3 April 1891 – 5 December 1954) was an Indian civil servant, diplomat and Governor.

== Early life and education ==
Bajpai was born in Allahabad to an orthodox Kanyakubja Brahmin family originally from Lucknow. He was the second son of Rai Bahadur Pandit Sir Seetla Prasad Bajpai CIE (1865 - 1947), who in the course of his career served as Chief Justice and Minister of Justice of Jaipur State and was knighted in 1939 and to Rukmine Shukla (18?? - 1945). He was initially educated at Muir Central College, from where he received a King's Scholarship to Oxford, taking a B.A. from Merton College, Oxford.

== Career ==
He entered the ICS on 16 October 1915. He began his career in the (then) United Provinces as an assistant collector and magistrate, receiving a promotion to joint magistrate in May 1918. In April 1921, he was appointed a secretary to V. S. Srinivasa Sastri, and served in this capacity until November 1922. He was appointed a Commander of the Order of the British Empire (CBE) in the 1923 New Year Honours list. From 1923 to 1930, Bajpai served in the Department of Education, Health and Lands, rising from under-secretary in September 1923 to deputy secretary (officiating) in March 1924 and to deputy secretary in June 1926. The secretary of a Government of India delegation to South Africa in 1926, he was appointed a Companion of the Order of the Indian Empire (CIE) in that year's Birthday Honours List. He was promoted to secretary (officiating) in the department of Education, Health and Lands in December 1927 and to joint secretary in November 1929.

From November 1930 to January 1931, Bajpai was a member of the British Indian delegation to the First Round Table Conference in London, and was promoted to the rank of collector and magistrate in October 1931. After a brief posting to South Africa from December 1931 to August 1932, he was appointed a full secretary in the Department of Education, Health and Lands, and was knighted as a Knight Commander of the Order of the British Empire (KBE) in the 1935 Birthday and Silver Jubilee Honours List. In March 1940, Sir Girija was appointed one of the six members of the Viceroy's Executive Council, the colonial version of a Cabinet, having previously served as a temporary member of the council from 1935 to 1936. In October 1941, he was appointed the Agent-General (roughly equivalent to an ambassadorial post) to the USA for India. He was appointed a Knight Commander of the Order of the Star of India (KCSI) in that year's Birthday Honours List.

Sir Girija was known for his ethics, oratory, strong will and far-reaching vision. It is said he warned Prime Minister Nehru about the potential for a Chinese invasion more than a decade before it happened. He represented India in numerous international forums in the 1930s and 1940s, including at the UN during the Kashmir debate. The American diplomat Vincent Sheean wrote in his book Nehru – The Years of Power that a technical error by the team headed by Girija Bajpai led to the Kashmir issue being considered a dispute rather than an act of aggression by Pakistan. The appeal should have been made under Chapter 7 of the UN charter rather than Chapter 6. This version is contradicted by Maharajakrishna Rasgotra, later to be Foreign Secretary, in his book A Life in Diplomacy.

Following the independence of India from the British Raj in 1947, Prime Minister Nehru retained Sir Girija as his principal foreign affairs adviser, appointing him the first Secretary General in the Ministry of External Affairs.

== Later years and death ==
Bajpai had experienced poor health for some years, and the pressures of the immediate post-Independence years took their toll. In failing health by 1952, he was appointed the Governor of Bombay State by Nehru, in part to allow him to recuperate. He recovered his health sufficiently to represent India the following year at the UN conferences on the Kashmir dispute, which were held at Geneva. Following his return to India, Sir Girija fell seriously ill in early 1954. He died in office of a cerebral haemorrhage in the early morning of 5 December 1954, aged 63. He lay in state in the audience hall of Raj Bhavan, his body draped with the tricolour as citizens, political leaders and consular officials filed past. Later that day, with thousands of people lining the streets, his body was conveyed to the crematorium in a gun carriage drawn by detachments of the army, navy, air force and the Mumbai Police. He was cremated with full ceremonial honours, including a 17-gun salute, fired as his eldest son, Uma Shankar Bajpai, lit the funeral pyre.

The (then) Vice President of India, Sarvepalli Radhakrishnan, delivered a eulogy in which he said Bajpai's life had been "an example of devotion and dedication" which would be long remembered.

== Personal life ==
Sir Girija Bajpai was known for his wealth and lifestyle. He always dressed impeccably and was considered an authority on clothes, fine wines and carpets. His ethics and strong sense of family responsibility led him to pay off his brother's debts, some of which were run up in his name, several times in an effort to preserve the family's reputation.

Bajpai was married to Rajni Misra of Kanpur, with whom he had four daughters and three sons; Uma Shankar Bajpai, Durga Shankar Bajpai and Katyayani Shankar Bajpai, all who became diplomats. Kanti Bajpai, the son of Uma Shankar, is a noted academic.

He was an early notable in Scouting and Guiding in India, and worked to unify their scattered organisations during the pre-independence era.

Preceded by Raja Maharaj Singh	Governor of Bombay; 1952–1954	Succeeded by Hare Krishna Mahtab
