= Kailash Vajpeyi =

Indian poet, writer

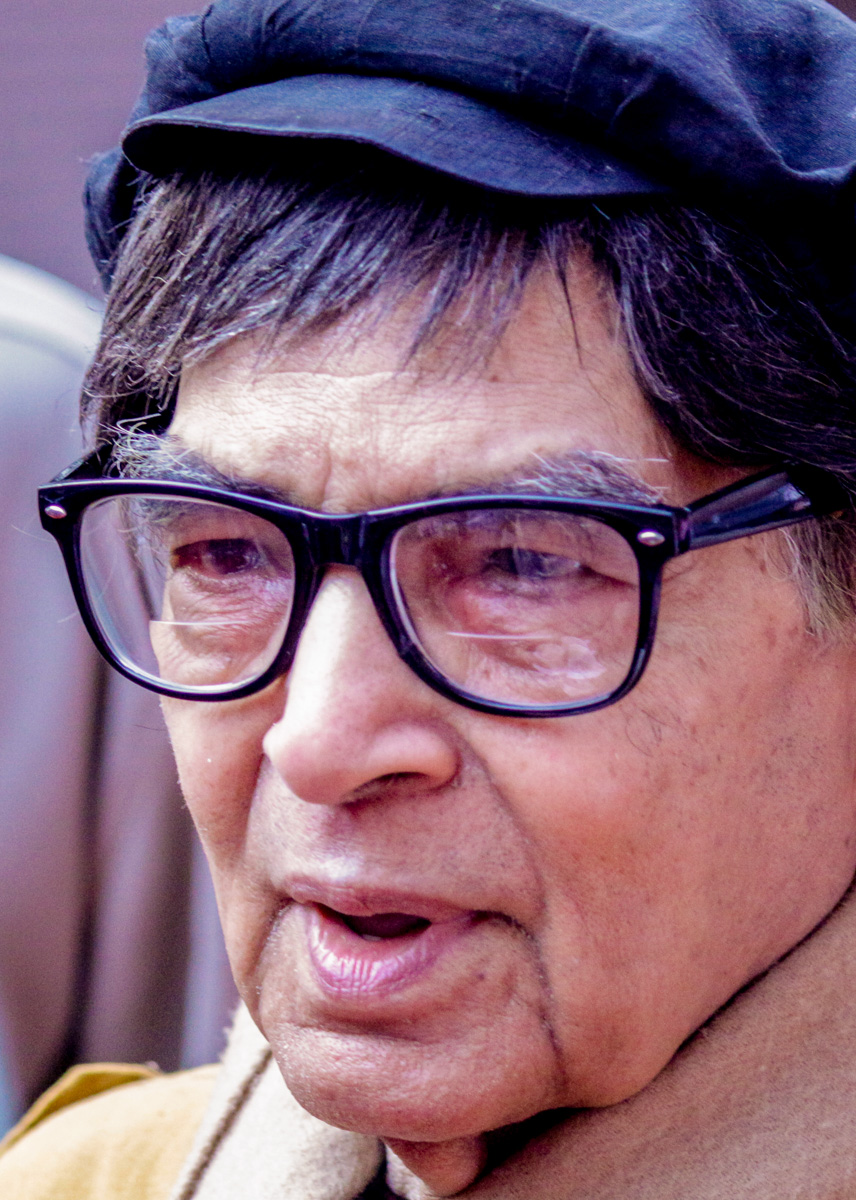
- Born: 11 November 1936; Hamirpur, United Provinces, British India
- Died: 1 April 2015 (aged 78); New Delhi, India
- Resting place: Lodhi Cremation Ground, New Delhi
- Education: Hindi literature PhD
- Alma mater: University of Lucknow
- Occupations: Poet; Writer; Lyricist
- Writing career
- Language: Hindi, Indic literature
- Years active: 1964–2015
- Subjects: Politics; Mysticism; Tradition; Spirituality
- Notable works: Sankranta, Teesra Andhera, Dehant se Hatkar, Sufinama, Hawa Mein Hastakshar
- Notable awards: Full list

Kailash Vajpeyi (IAST Kailāśa Vājapeyī 11 November 1936 – 1 April 2015) was an Indian poet, writer, and lyricist who chiefly wrote Hindi language poems throughout his literary career. He wrote more than 28 books, including one of his publications Hawa Mein Hastakshar which translates to "signature in the air" for which he was awarded a literary honour Sahitya Akademi Award in 2009. The University of Lucknow awarded him Vachaspati (Lord of speech) title in recognition of his contribution to Hindi literature.

== Early life ==
Vajpeyi was born in Hamirpur, Uttar Pradesh. He did his PhD degree in Hindi. He was initially working as a journalist and worked for different magazines. He used to teach at Shivaji College of the University of Delhi and continued until he retired in 2004. From 2008 to 2013, he served at General Council of Sahitya Akademi for five years. When he was studying at the University of Lucknow, he associated himself with Chaitanya Mahaprabhu's bhakti movement, vedas and Jayadeva's writings. Later he went to Puducherry where he created a documentary on an Indian philosopher Sri Aurobindo.

== Literary career ==
Vajpeyi began his career writing articles for magazines as a journalist, and later wrote poems on politics through his publications such as "Sankranta" in 1964, "Teesra Andhera", and "Dehant se Hatkar". His poetic work was primarily focused on political systems, mysticism, tradition and spirituality. During his last days, his poetry was themed on "death". He criticised the first prime minister of India Jawaharlal Nehru in his poem titled "Rajdhani". He wrote eponymous poems during 1970s. One of his poems was banned by the government of India for its controversial lines, stating to sing a new national anthem. Vajpeyi's prominent literal work revolved around Sufi devotional poems and sankrant. Some of his essays were translated in multiple foreign languages, including English, German and Spanish.

After he wrote some critic poems he went to Mexico and Dallas. He returned to India in 1980s with a new field of poetry and started writing about Hindu saints, musicians and with the theoretical aspects of a subject such as Jain-Buddhism, advaita vedanta, hinayana, and Sufi philosophy. His poem Rajdhani remained the subject of a dispute among the parliament members that sparked a controversy in the parliament, and later the federal government banned his numerous poems, including "Rajdhani". It is believed his poetic style was changed after visiting the U.S. He was influenced by the different mysticism and philosophical literature such as Zen Buddhism, Sufism and Vedanta. He was also involved in writing anti-establishment poetry and lyrics, and later changed his initial poetic views citing "poetry make nothing happen, it is a signature in the wind."

== Awards and recognitions ==
Vajpeyi was the recipient of numerous literary awards and honours, including Sahitya Akademi Award, S.S. Millennium Award, Vyas Samman, the World Hindi Literature Award, and Human Care Trust Award in recognition of his contribution to the Hindi and Indic literature (English).

== Death ==
In April 2015 he suffered from degenerative disease and was subsequently admitted to a hospital. He died at Max Healthcare on 1 April 2015 of heart attack.

== Bibliography ==
- Vajpeyi, Kailash (1967). Dehānta se haṭakara. Akshara Prakāśana. p. 136.
- Vajpeyi, Kailash (1972). Tīsaraā an̐dherā. Rājakamala Prakāśana. p. 120.
- Vajpeyi, Kailash (1978). Beyond the Self: Poems. Indian Literary Review Editions. p. 57.
- Vajpeyi, Kailash (1979). Visions & Myths: Contemporary Hindi Poetry. Indian Literary Review Editions. p. 132.
- Vajpeyi, Kailash (1984). Indian Horizons, Volume 33. Indian Council for Cultural Relations.
- Vajpeyi, Kailash (1998). An Anthology of Modern Hindi Poetry. Rupa & Company. p. 318.
- Vajpeyi, Kailash (2005). Havā meṃ hastākshara. Vani Prakashan. p. 112. ISBN 9788181432971.
- Vajpeyi, Kailash (2006). Shabd sansar. Bhartiya Jnanpith. p. 226. ISBN 9788126311019.
- Vajpeyi, Kailash (2006). Pr̥thvī kā kr̥shṇapaksha. Kitāba Ghara. p. 128.
