= Katyayani Shankar Bajpai =

Indian diplomat (1928–2020)

Ambassador of India to the United States
- In office 1984–1986
- Preceded by: K. R. Narayanan

Ambassador of India to China
- In office 1980–1982
- Preceded by: R. D. Sathe
- Succeeded by: K. P. S. Menon Jr.

High Commissioner of India to Pakistan
- In office 1976–1980

Personal details
- Born: 30 March 1928; Jaipur
- Died: 30 August 2020 (aged 92)

Katyayani Shankar Bajpai (30 March 1928 – 30 August 2020) was an Indian diplomat. He served as the Indian envoy to Pakistan (1976–1980), China (1980–1982) and to the United States (1984–1986). These three postings are considered to be the most important for an Indian diplomat.

== Early life and education ==
He was born on 30 March 1928 in Jaipur. His father Girija Shankar Bajpai was also a diplomat. He completed his bachelor's degree in modern history at Oxford University in 1949.

== Career ==
He joined the Indian Foreign Service in 1952, and had stints in Turkey and Pakistan. He accompanied Prime Minister Lal Bahadur Shastri for the Tashkent summit.

In 1970, he was appointed the Indian political officer in Sikkim. Bajpai served in that capacity during the Indian annexation of Sikkim, and was put in charge of the administration during the transition.

He served as Ambassador to Pakistan (1976–1980), China (1980–1982) and to the United States (1984–1986). He was the Indian ambassador to the United States during Rajiv Gandhi's state visit in 1985.

After retiring from the IFS in 1986, he taught as a visiting professor at the University of California, Los Angeles and University of California, Berkeley. He later became the first professor of non-Western studies at Brandeis University. In 1994, he founded Delhi Policy Group, an independent think tank. From 1995 to 2000, he worked as a Senior International Adviser at Merrill Lynch in New York.

He continued to be informally consulted by the Indian government on matters relating to India-United states relations. Bajpai died in 2020 at the age of 92 after contracting COVID-19. At the time of his death, he'd been working on a biography of his father.

== Personal life ==
He was married to Meera Bajpai and had two sons. His brother Uma Shankar Bajpai was a former Indian High Commissioner to Canada. Kanti Bajpai, the son of Uma Shankar, is a noted academic. His interests included poetry, films, and cooking.
