= Kanti Bajpai =

Indian academic

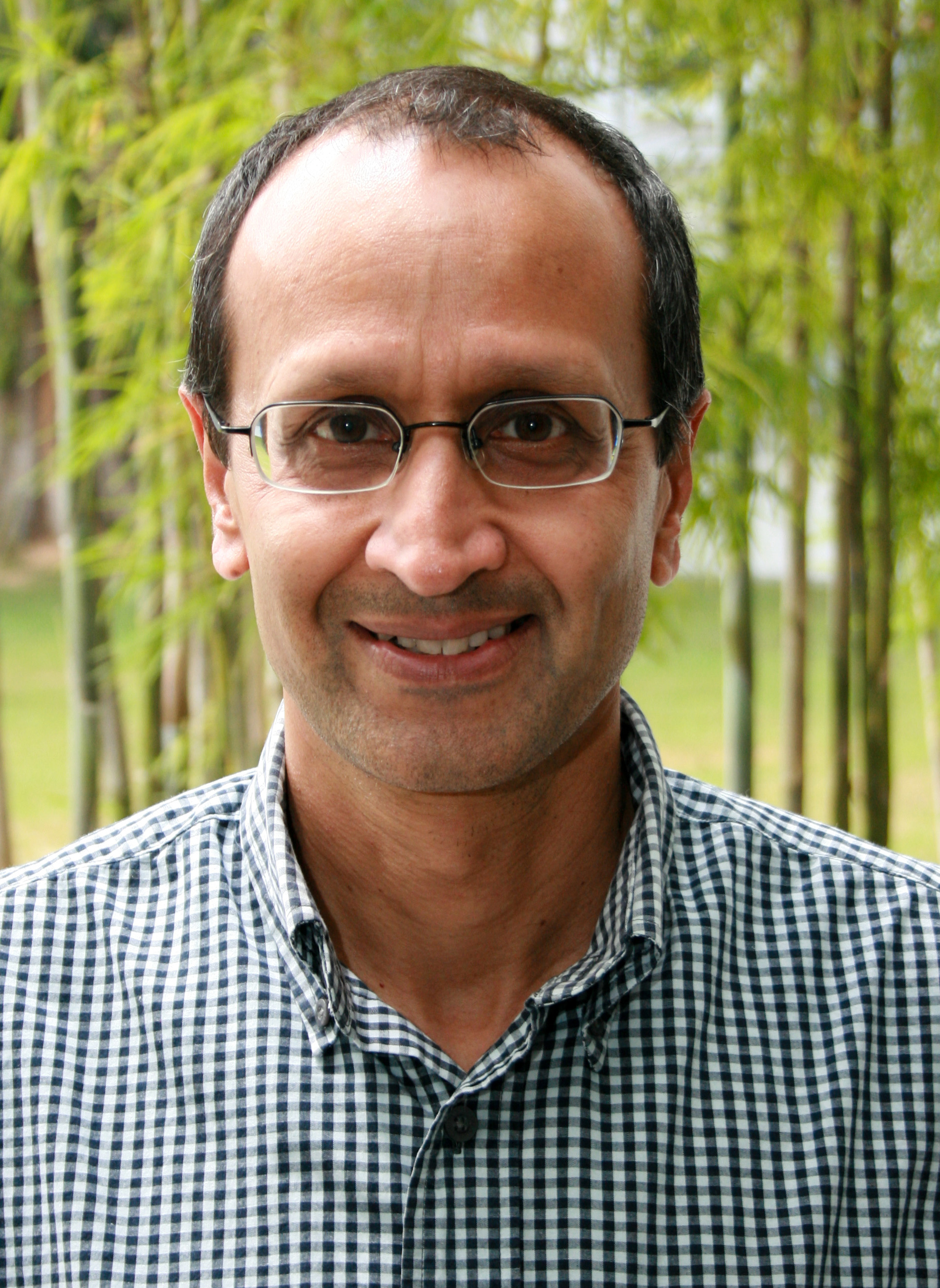
- Education: M. A, PhD
- Alma mater: University of British Columbia; University of Illinois; The Doon School
- Occupations: Political Scientist, International Relations Expert, Writer, scholar, academic, former Headmaster of Doon School
- Relatives: Uma Shankar Bajpai (father); Girija Shankar Bajpai (grandfather); Katyayani Shankar Bajpai (uncle)
- Writing career
- Subject: International relations
- Notable awards: K. Subrahmanyam Award
- Website: lkyspp.nus.edu.sg/cag/about-us/our-team/kanti-prasad-bajpai

Kanti Prasad Bajpai (born 1955) is an Indian political scientist, international affairs expert, academic and the former headmaster of The Doon School, Dehradun, India. He is known to be an expert on Indo-China relations. He is currently Vice Dean (Research and Development) and Wilmar Professor of Asian Studies at Lee Kuan Yew School of Public Policy (LKYSPP) of the National University of Singapore. Bajpai also writes a monthly column for The Times of India.

== Early life and education ==
Kanti Prasad Bajpai comes from a family of Indian diplomats: his father, Uma Shankar Bajpai was a former Indian High Commissioner to Canada; uncle, Katyayani Shankar Bajpai was a former Ambassador to United States; and his grandfather, Sir Girija Shankar Bajpai, was Agent-General for India in the United States prior to India gaining independence.

Bajpai, like most of his family before him, completed his schooling at The Doon School, where he also edited The Doon School Weekly. After leaving Doon in 1972, Bajpai obtained his Bachelor of Arts in Economics and Master of Arts in political science from the University of British Columbia in British Columbia, Canada, and returned to Doon and taught there in 1981. Bajpai went to North America to earn his PhD in political science from the University of Illinois in 1982.

== Career ==
Bajpai returned to India in 1989 and taught at Maharaja Sayajirao University of Baroda for three years, he went back to America to teach at Wesleyan University. In 1993 he returned again to India to the Institute of Contemporary Studies of the Rajiv Gandhi Foundation. In 1994, he joined Jawaharlal Nehru University as professor of international studies. In 2000, he was a visiting professor at University of Notre Dame in South Bend, Indiana. He also worked as a researcher at the Brookings Institution in Washington, D.C. the same year.

In June 2003, Bajpai was appointed the eighth Headmaster of The Doon School. During his tenure at Doon, he was instrumental in modernizing the facilities.

After completing his tenure as Headmaster in 2009, Bajpai left Doon to join the School of Inter Disciplinary Area studies, Wolfson College, Oxford. After a short stint at Oxford, he joined the Lee Kuan Yew School of Public Policy at National University of Singapore as a Senior Professor. At LKYSPP, he is currently serving his second stint as the Vice Dean (Research).

== Publications ==
- South Asia after the Cold War: international perspectives, by Kanti P. Bajpai, Stephen P. Cohen, Program in Arms Control, Disarmament and International Security. Westview Press, 1993. ISBN 0-8133-8762-0.
- Interpreting world politics: essays for A.P. Rana, by A. P. Rana, Kanti P. Bajpai, H. C. Shukul. Sage Publications, 1995. ISBN 0-8039-9210-6.
- International Relations in India: Theorising the region and nation, by Kanti P. Bajpai, Siddharth Mallavarapu. Orient Blackswan, 2005. ISBN 81-250-2640-1. Excerpts
- International Relations in India: Bringing theory back home, by Kanti P. Bajpai, Siddharth Mallavarapu. Orient Blackswan, 2005. ISBN 81-250-2639-8.
- "Chapter 2 – Pakistan's Future: Muddle Along (Book: The Future of Pakistan by Stephen P.Cohen & Others, 2011). ISBN 978-0-8157-2180-2
- India Versus China: Why They Are Not Friends. June 2021. Kanti Bajpai. Juggernaut. ISBN 978-9391165086

== Awards ==
- K Subrahmanyam Award – Award for Excellence in research and strategic security issues.

Academic offices
Preceded by John Mason	Headmaster of The Doon School; 2003–2009	Succeeded by Peter McLaughlin
