= British International School, Cairo =

School in Cairo, Egypt

The British International School, Cairo

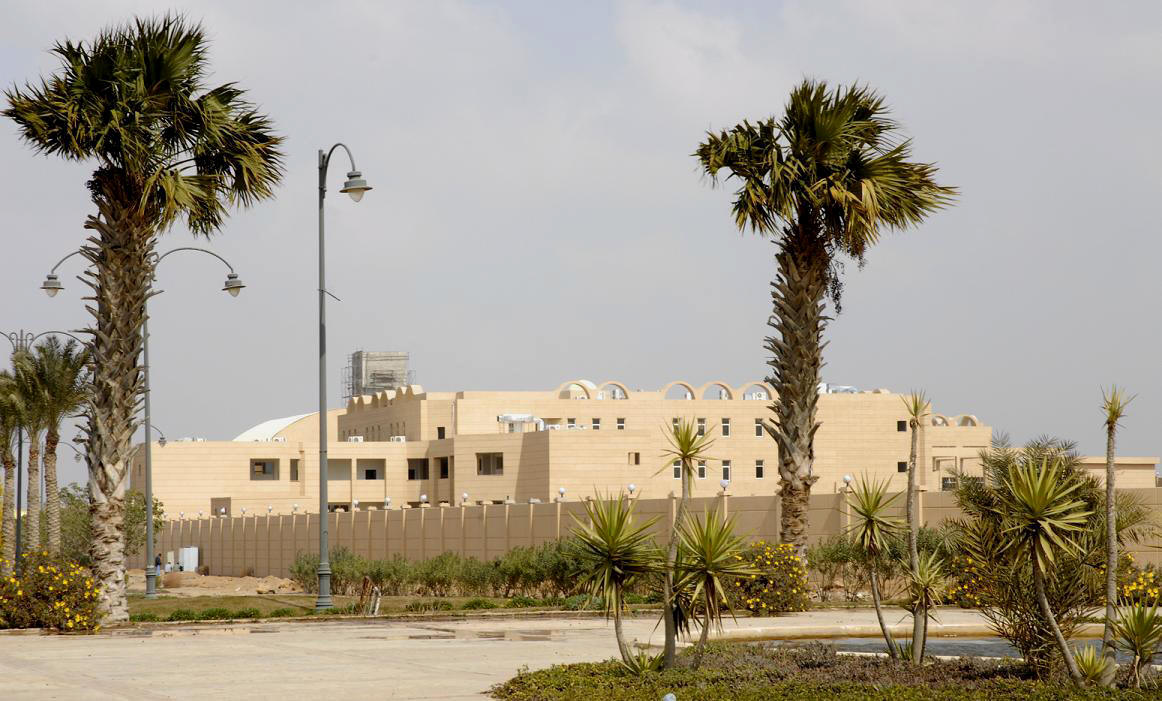
- The British International School, Cairo from behind the exterior wall
- 6th of October City, Egypt

Information
- Type: Private
- Established: 1976
- Principal: Mr. Chris Hansen
- Enrollment: 1100
- Website: bisc.edu.eg

The British International School, Cairo (BISC) is a private British school in Beverly Hills, a compound within the 6th of October City, in Greater Cairo, Egypt.

BISC was previously in Zamalek. It moved from its Zamalek location in September 2008 to its new purpose-built campus in the residential compound of Beverly Hills. BISC has an extensive campus with facilities including a theatre, Olympic swimming pool and age-appropriate learning spaces for all students.

BISC is an independent, fee-financed, not for profit school authorized by the Ministry of Education. The Good Schools Guide International states that the school "offers a world-class education – the best in Egypt – and prestige. To be a BISC IB graduate certainly says something."

The school is regularly inspected by BSO and is one of only a handful of schools certified by COBIS within Egypt.
