= Gangadhara Vajapeyi =

Vedic scholar of the Yajurveda

Gangadhara Vajapeyi/ Gangadhara Vajapeyin /Gaṅgādhara Vājapeyayāji also known by names Gangadhara Adhvarin and Gangadhara Suri was a great vedic scholar of the Yajurveda from Thiruvalangadu in Nagapattinam district of Tamil Nadu. He was son of Shri Deva Nrisimha Bhatta and Sumati, whose ancestors were connected with Appayya Dikshita. Gangadhara Vajapeyi was a grandson of Samarapungava Dikshita who had authored books like Advaita Vidyatilakam and Yatra Prabandha. Samarapungava Dikshita was a sororal nephew of Appayya Dikshita. Gangadhara was a disciple of Visvarupa. He was a Smarta brahmin belonging to the Vadhula gotra.

He was an expert in Nyaya and Tarka Shastra. He was one of the eight jewels at the court of Maratha king Serfoji I of Tanjore. He had performed the Vajapeya yagna, which was presided by the Maratha King Serfoji and such given title of Vajapeyi.

Most importantly, he is remembered as the Guru of Bhaskararaya – one of the greatest shrauta scholar and exponent of the tantra of recent times. Bhaskararaya acquired knowledge of the Nyaya sastra and Tarka sastra from Gangadhara Vajapeyin. Bhaskararaya was one of the foremost authority Shri Vidya, which he learned from Gandahara Vajapeyi . Bhaskararaya's commentary on the Lalita sahasranama (bhashya) and his commentary on the Shri Vidya mantra and worship are most well known.

Gangadhara, his disciple Bhaskararaya and Krishnananda Saraswati were all senior contemporaries of Ayyaval and Bodhendra.

Gangadhara Vajapeyin built the shrine of Utpaleshwarar and Utpalaamba, which has been looked after by his descendants. The two idols of Meru of Panchaloha and gold are preserved in this temple.

== Gangadhara Vajapeyi's Works ==
He wrote a rare commentary on Kuvalayananda in year 1700 (a book on Alankara Shastra) of Appayya Dikshitar viz: Rasikaranjani., which one of his most noted books.

He also wrote Avaidika Darsana Samgraha. The work was very popular in South India and is considered to be an important source book on Buddha-Jaina fundamentals next to Sarva-darśana-saṅ̇graha of Vidyaranya.

His other works include; Bhosalavamsavali, which deals in systems of philosophy, Kanadasidhhanta cándrika or Kanada Siddhantachandrika a work on vaisesika. and a commentary or Samhita on Dharmasastra called Dharmasamhita.
