= Tejeshwar Singh =

Indian actor (1947–2007)

Tejeshwar Singh (31 January 1947 – 15 December 2007) was an Indian publisher, journalist, newscaster and theater activist.

== Early life and background ==
Singh was the son of Indian diplomat Gurbachan Singh, who served as an envoy to Switzerland, Bhutan and Pakistan. He graduated from The Doon School and went on to study at Balliol College, University of Oxford.

== Career ==
In 1981 he founded, along with George and Sara McCune, the Indian arm of the international publishing house Sage Publishing, which is now a prominent Indian publishing house. However, Singh was most well known to Indians as a famous newsreader on the nationwide television network, Doordarshan, during the 1980s and early 1990s. He reported discontinuing reading newspapers after Indira Gandhi declared emergency in India. He reported that Indira Gandhi personally approved the footage of Operation Blue Star in Golden Temple/Harmandir Sahib for news on Doordarshan.

He also acted as a main villain Deen Dayal in the well-known 1987 Hindi film Jalwa and played Ravi Uncle in Chai Pani Etc. in 2004.

Tejeshwar Singh died of a heart attack at his home in Mussoorie, India, on 15 December 2007. He was 60 when he died.

== The Tejeshwar Singh Memorial Fellowships ==
Sage Publishing instituted the Tejeshwar Singh Memorial Fellowships in 2009 to honour Tejeshwar Singh, the managing director of Sage India for 25 years and doyen of the publishing industry in South Asia. Every year, SAGE invites applications for the award of The Tejeshwar Singh Memorial Fellowships in the following categories.

- Social Sciences
- Business & Management
- Media & Communication Studies

The duration of scholarship is one year. A stipend of rupees 50,000 a month Teje(50,000 X 12) with an additional amount of rupees 50,000 can be claimed for travel during the tenure of the fellowship. Total value of the Fellowship is rupees 6,50,000. The scholarship eligibility is open to all nationals of South Asian (SAARC) countries, including those currently resident overseas.
