= Laxmi Shankar Bajpai =

Indian poet

- Born: 10 January 1955 (age 71); Kanpur India
- Occupations: Hindi Poet; Deputy Direction of AIR Aakashwani
- Spouse: Mamta Kiran

Laxmi Shankar Bajpai (born 10 January 1955) is a poet, Gazalkaar, and communicator. He retired as a Deputy Director General from AIR Akashwani.

== Early life ==
Laxmi Shankar Bajpai is Postgraduate in Physics, He started his career as PEX from AIR Gwalior and served various stations like Bikaner, Almoda, kathua, national Channel etc. He has given new dimensions to Hindi commentary and has brought to the public Aankho Dekha Haal on many occasions on 26 January, 15 August and many other events of National and International Importance.

Laxmi Shankar Bajpai was the only poet representing India at 2013 World Poetry Festival, held at Venezuela. He has done Poetry recital in several cities of Northern Ireland, Wales and Britain, Moscow and also poetry recital as a representative of India in Poland, and Trinidad and England, in 2005. He was awarded Children's Literature Award by Delhi Hindi Academy. He has been a translator and moderator of AIR's prestigious ‘All Language Poets Conference’ several times. His Poems have been published in numerous magazines of the country and abroad. He has compared more than 100 national and international events live at AIR Akashwani like Republic Day Parade, International Film Festival in Goa, Lahore bus trip etc.

== Books ==
1. Machhar Mama Samajh Gaya Hun
2. Khushboo To Bacha Li Jaye
3. Bejubaan Dard
