= Uma Shankar Bajpai =

Indian diplomat

Uma Shankar Bajpai (1921/1922, Jaipur – 6 February 2005) was an Indian diplomat and a veteran journalist. He was also the director of India International Centre.

Kanti Bajpai, the Indian academic, is his son.

== Life and career ==
Uma Shankar Bajpai was born in Jaipur. His father was Girija Shankar Bajpai (1891–1954), an eminent Indian civil servant, diplomat and Governor. His brother Katyayani Shankar Bajpai was also a renowned diplomat who served as the Indian envoy to Pakistan, China and the United States.

Bajpai joined the Indian Foreign Service. He was posted at the Karachi Consulate, Pakistan, for some time. Bajpai's last foreign posting was as High Commissioner of Canada. He retired as the Secretary of Ministry of Foreign Affairs. After his retirement from the Indian Foreign Service, he took the role as director of India International Centre. He is credited with revamping the institution.

Uma Shankar Bajpai died on 6 February 2005 at the age of 83.

== Details ==
- Educated at Merton College, Oxford and Ecole des Hautes Etudes Universitaire.
- 1948-1952: Under Secretary, South Block.
- 1952-1955: First Secretary Indian Embassy in Rome.
- 1957-1959: First Secretary Indian Embassy in Kathmandu.
- 1959-1961: First Secretary Indian Embassy in Paris.
- 1965-1966: Minister at the Indian High Commission, London.
- 1966-1969: Deputy High Commissioner in Karachi.
- December 1969 to October 1972: ambassador to Ankara.
- October 1972-April 1977: High Commissioner to Ottawa.
- 30 June 1977 – 31 May 1978: ambassador to Bern.
- August 1979: retirement
