= Manikchandra Vajpayee =

Indian journalist and writer

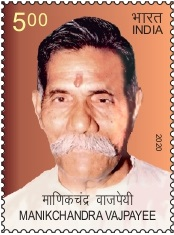
- A Commemorative postage stamp on Manikchandra Vajpayee, released in 2020
- Born: 7 October 1919; Bateshwar, United Provinces of Agra and Oudh, British India
- Died: 25 December 2005 (aged 86); Gwalior, Madhya Pradesh, India
- Other name: Mamaji
- Citizenship: India
- Education: B.A. & Law
- Occupations: Journalist, founder editor of multi-edition Hindi daily Swadesh
- Political party: Bharatiya Jana Sangh
- Family: Atal Bihari Vajpayee (nephew)

Manikchandra Vajpayee (also spelt as Manikchand Vajpayee) (7 October 1919 – 25 December 2005), also known as Mamaji, was an Indian journalist, writer, and RSS Pracharak. He is noted for his contribution to the field of journalism. He was the founder-editor of the multi-edition Hindi daily newspaper Swadesh. The Manikchandra Vajpayee National Journalism Awards, which the Government of Madhya Pradesh named after Manikchandra Vajpayee, is one of India's awards in the field of journalism.

He is credited with expanding Swadesh from a small newspaper into a multi-edition daily, which now has eight editions, and his journalism has been regarded within the Sangh as a benchmark. Apart from his work as a journalist, Vajpayee authored more than half a dozen books.

== Early life ==
Manikchandra Vajpayee was born on 7 October 1919, in Bateshwar of Agra district of Uttar Pradesh, India. Vajpayee completed his middle school examination in Gwalior and received a gold medal in the intermediate examination conducted by the Ajmer Board. He later completed his B.A. and L.L.B. degrees.

== Career ==
He started journalism as the editor of Deshmitra published from Bhind district. He worked as an RSS pracharak from 1944 to 1953, working for the organisation's expansion in the Bhind region of present-day Madhya Pradesh. He also worked as a teacher in Lahrauli, Bhind district, for ten years from 1954.

He served as the Organizing Secretary of Bharatiya Jana Sangh in 1953. He contested the assembly elections from Bhind in 1957 against Narsingh Rao Dikshit and in 1962 against Vijaya Raje Scindia from Gwalior, as directed by the Bharatiya Jana Sangh.

He served as the editor of the daily Hindi newspaper Swadesh (Indore) from 1968 to 1985. In the year 1975, Vajpayee was jailed during The Emergency, but he did not let his writing stop. He was in Indore jail for 19 months. He continued to write editorials from the jail. He was associated with Swadesh since its establishment in 1966. He also served as the advisory editor of the Bhopal, Jabalpur, Sagar, Raipur and Bilaspur editions of Swadesh. He was editor-in-chief of Gwalior, Jhansi and Guna editions of Swadesh from 1987 to 2005.

Mamaji was also the President of Indore Press Club from 1978 to 1980. During his tenure, the Indore Press Club became quite discussed for his activities. He raised the demand to eliminate the old waste laws through this press club.

In October 2020, his biography book, Shabdapurush: Manikchandra Vajpayee was launched by Sarsanghachalak Mohan Bhagwat and Minister of Information and Broadcasting Prakash Javadekar. The book was jointly published by Prabhat Prakashan and the Indira Gandhi National Centre for the Arts.

== Personal life and death ==
He died on 25 December 2005, in Indore, Madhya Pradesh. Former Prime Minister Atal Bihari Vajpayee visited Gwalior to pay his respects.

Manikchandra was married and had a son and a daughter, both of whom died before him. His wife also died before him.

== Recognition and commemoration ==
In 2005, he was honored with the Dr Hedgewar Pragya Award in Kolkata for his significant contribution in the field of journalism.

In 2006, the State Government of Madhya Pradesh, led by CM Shivraj Singh Chouhan established "Manikchandra Vajpayee National Journalism Award". Later, the award was discontinued by the Congress government. In 2020, the award was restarted by Shivraj Singh Chouhan's government.

In 2013, a biography of Vajpayee, titled Patrakarita Ke Yug Nirmata: Manikchand Vajpayee, was written by Kailash Gaur and published by Makhanlal Chaturvedi National University of Journalism and Communication, Bhopal.

In December 2020, the Government of India's postal department issued a postage stamp to commemorate Vajpayee. The postal stamp release ceremony was attended by CM Shivraj Singh Chouhan and former governor Kaptan Singh Solanki.

== Selected bibliography ==
- Keral Mein Marks Nahi Mahesh
- Rashtriya Swayamsevak Sangh: Apne Samvidhan Ke Aaine Mein
- Samay Ki Shila Par
- Pahli Agni Pariksha
- Aapatkaleen Sangharsh Ki Gaatha
- Bharatiya Naari: Vivekanand Ki Drishti Se
- Kashmir Ka Kadwa Sach
- Pope Ka Kasta Shikanka
- Jyoti Jala Nij Praan Ki
- Partition-Days The Fiery Saga of RSS

== See also ==
- List of Indian journalists
