= Classical Hindu law in practice =

Classical Hindu law in practice originates from community, not a state polity. In this way, particular groups of society began to gain influence in the creation and administration of law. Primary corporate groups, Kingships, and Brahmins were the factions, which conveyed Hindu jurisprudence in practice. Corporate groups were responsible for legislating law through the conception of social norms; kingships were responsible for the administration of punishment and the worldly Hindu system; and Brahmins were responsible for ritual, penance, and the maintenance of a spiritual Hindu system.

== Administration of Classical Hindu Law ==
=== Corporate groups ===
Corporate groups in medieval India included, but were not limited to, merchants, traders, religious specialists, soldiers, agriculturalists, pastoralists, and castes. These groups held legal prominence in classical Indian society because the primary authority and responsibility for law at the time came from the community, not a state polity. Particularly, early Dharmasūtra (dharmasutra) texts, beginning in about the 2nd BC, recognized a full-fledged theology surrounding the household institution. The texts viewed households and families as the archetype of community, "an exemplary institution of religious and legal reflection of Hindu jurisprudence". Thus, Hindu jurisprudence portrayed the household, not the state, as the primary institution of law. Connectedly, the household is the institution to which Hindu law is most applied. For example, the texts are most explicit in reference to quotidian household acts such as eating, bathing, creating a family, etc. The focus on the household and other local institutions helped to identify the shared goals and goods within society which are inherent to Hindu law. Furthermore, small-scale communities such as the household were more effective in imposing the acceptance of common values and core ideas.

Because of the social implication revolving around the importance of the household and the community in the creation and administration of law, Hindu law jurisprudentially subordinated state law to the law of castes and life-stages (varnasramadharma). In this manner, each caste and life-stage was responsible for highly localized occupations. –

Table 1. Dharmas of the Castes, showing the subordinate place of political rulership

I. Brahmin

a. six occupations – teaching and studying the Veda, offering and officiating at sacrifices, giving and accepting gifts (MDh10.74-75)

II. Kṣatriya

a. three occupations – studying the Veda, offering sacrifices, and giving gifts (MDh 10.77, 79)
b. special dharmas = rājadharma, the dharma of a ruler (MDh 10.79-80)

1. protection of the people (MDh 7.144; YS 1.323, 335)
2. promulgation of the law of castes and life-stages (MDh 7.24, 35; 8.41, 390-91, 410-418; YS 1.361; NS 12.117, 18.5)
3. punishment of the wicked (MDh 7.14-31; YS 1.338, 354-359)
4. adjudication of disputes

III. Vaiśya

a. three occupations – studying the Veda, offering sacrifices, and giving gifts (MDh 10.78-79)
b. special dharmas (MDh 9.326-333; 10.79-80)

1. trade
2. animal husbandry
3. agriculture

IV. Śūdra

a. special dharma – "obedient service to distinguished Brahmin householders who are learned in the Veda" (MDh 9.334)

Although the household and family were central to corporate groups’ influence, medieval India was a time of political integration over larger and larger core areas. During the time, corporate groups showed increased importance in the creation and administration of law. Such influence came with the development of corporate groups as intermediary tools. These intermediate-corporate groups exercised influence in two main ways:

1. they moderate legal influences of both "highly local sources (villages, families, etc)" and "elite-level political rulers", which promotes pragmatic conflict resolution and the circulation of legal standards for specific groups, and
2. they reconcile legal norms that influence local and regional customary law with esoteric Brahminical dialogue of Dharmaśāstra which establish "viable ideologies" that respect both customary and textual law.

Corporate groups also created their own laws and systems of jurisprudence. Specifically, the concept of ācāra in the Hindu legal texts (i.e. the Dharmaśāstra) legitimized these localized laws. Ācāra allowed localized corporate groups to create their own laws, especially in the situations where Hindu legal texts were vague, ambiguous, or completely silent. In particular, ācāra of specific corporate groups plays out in practice as "norms accepted and imposed by the leaders of various social institutions". The key to the legitimization of these norms created and accepted by the leaders of corporate groups is the concept of the ‘good person’ in ācāra. This principal allows for the dissemination of sastric and Vedic control over practice through the mediation of experts who are learned in the texts. Through this, the Dharmaśāstra is connected to real life in a "mediate" way. Ācāra is also recognized and validated in a legal sense through the device of paribhāṣā, which deemed the conventional rules of ācāra as technical supplementary refinements of the rules of the śāstra.

=== Kingships ===
The dharmasastras, starting with Manu, first addressed the function of the king pertaining to the administration of Hindu law. These texts define the king as ‘he who has been anointed.’ Many scholars interpret anointment as the celebration of coronation rites, and thus believe that the ceremony is necessary to invest the king with supreme authority. Although no rules lay down why or how a particular individual fits to qualify as king, Manu VII.2 indicates that only a Kṣatriya has the right to kingship. Some assume this is because the Kṣatriya possessed the force necessary to obtain obedience. However, interpreters of other dharmasastras, dispute this qualifying trait. The king was considered to have a divine nature, but not because of birth or immortality. Rather, the king encompassed god-likeness through exercising the royal function, which the texts say the gods created. This royal function is the source of the king's authority. The royal function vests the king with the power of command (kṣatra) and the mission to protect the people and give them the guarantee of security. The sastras delineate the royal function to be the king's dharma (rājadharma). Aside from physical protection from the harmful in and outside of king's jurisdiction, rājadharma protects and permits his subjects’ dharma to flourish. In this way, the king's dharma encompasses all dharma since each individual's performance of his or her personal duties is dependent on the protection secured by the king. Because of this interconnectedness between rājadharma and individual dharma (swadharma) "the salvation of the king depends on his subjects, just as the salvation of the subjects depend on the king". The king's spiritual happiness depends on his subjects, for he suffers the consequences of their sins and profits from the merits they acquire. This relation applies vice versa as well.

==== Punishment and justice ====
The royal function gives two main privileges: the right to tax and the right to punish (daṇḍa), and they are benefits outlined solely for the king. Only the king may use punishment to secure the execution of his orders. Due to his ability to punish, the king possesses an unlimited power on the temporal plane, and he may do whatever he wishes. Narada says, "whatever the king does is justified: such is the rule." Furthermore, the execution of punishment ensures justice within the king's jurisdiction, and thus the king is the sole judge of the means needed to accomplish his mission of justice. In this vein, he may act as he deems necessary for justice. Moreover, exercising the royal function to maintain justice is equivalent to the celebration of a sacrifice, which keeps the king pure no matter what actions he must commit to bring a culprit to justice. However, although a king is always justified on a temporal plane, he would suffer the consequences of poor actions in his next lives.

Punishment falls under royal authority because it pertains to accomplishing true justice—a concept only the king can judge. Thus, where there is textual silence, kings are responsible for administrating trials (vyavahāra) of criminal law as well as administering punishment (daṇḍa) for criminal acts. King's judge trials other than criminal cases too, except when parties do not wish to appear before him. When parties do not wish to bring a complaint to the king, individuals and corporate groups conduct their own trials. In these cases, although corporate groups such as castes and vocational sects have their own jurisdiction (which came from customary origins) they are still in the king's control. The king exercises this control through the recognition of a corporate group's particular jurisprudence. Recognition is important because the king's court is the only jurisdiction Dharmasastras identifies, thus the king's acceptance of other courts transfers sastric meaning to the particular jurisdictions. The king also employs danda when the Dharmasastra gives more than one penalty for a crime or when texts are contradictory. He is a source of last resort on questions of both fact and law, but once the king passes judgment it is not up for review.

==== Lawmaking ====
Kings were not very active in legislating especially for the reason that Hindu legal texts always preceded the authority of the king. In this way, kings were limited in their ability to make laws on conduct because the Veda already outlined dharma. Judgments made by the king were never law, but considered orders. These orders did not change laws or give new interpretations to texts but merely secured order and peace to the king's jurisdiction. More reasonably, the king was an administrator rather than a legislator. As an administrator, the king maintained peace between his subjects rather than made laws. In addition, royal authority did allow the king to divide tasks of administration amongst ministers and to define the scope and the powers of each ministry. Davis further attributes the lack of royal legislation or edict to the social context presumed by Hindu jurisprudence (i.e. the subordination of the state to the household). In this way, "the state is jurisprudentially part of the household dharma of the ruler"

=== Brahminical jurisprudence ===
The Brahmin was an integral part of the administration of classical Hindu law. For Gautama, the Brahmins and the king sustain the divine order of the world, the Brahmins with their council and the king by punishment. In this way, dharma cannot come to fruition without the two castes’ cooperation. The Brahmin's opinion is the only counterbalance to the king's authority in society, and because of this, the texts say that the king cannot make a decision without the advice of a Brahmin. For this reason, Brahmins have a right to participate in the court of justice. Additionally, when a king cannot preside over a case himself, a Brahmin must be appointed to take his place. The Brahmin not only gives advice on the administration of justice but also in affairs of the state. "Brahmin is master when the question is one of ritual and of penance. But his scope extends in reality over all the field of royal activity, as much on its political side as on its religious". The superiority of the Brahmin is not attached to their birth (varna) but to the fact that they are devoted to the study of the Veda, and thus are qualified to instruct other people. Because of this devotion to the Veda, the Brahmin is more closely in line with the divine than the king. Thus, Gautama says, the king is the master of all with the exception of the Brahmin. Such high ranking in the classical Hindu law system is apparent in that Brahmins are exempt from taxes, and may own land (something that is reserved for only kings and Brahmins).

== Judicial practices of Classical Hindu Law ==
There are no references of Judicial procedure in early Vedic times but there was a frequent mention of the term Rta implying that there was a divine cosmic order by which the universe was regulated. The idea of Dharma seems to have developed from Rta, since Dharma later became the word commonly used in ancient India to designate law. The Rig Veda provides little evidence of civil law. In ancient India Dharma had a religious basis and was enforced by religious threat. It changed not by the will of the king but the evolution of social custom usages and practices. During the Brahmana period, the process of giving punishments to culprits was formed and for this reason law-assistants were appointed. The full Judicial procedure came into light during the composition of the Dharmaśāstras and Smrtis. King figures appeared as the highest judicial authority with a network of courts established under him. The courts consisted of ten members King, Pravivaka, the Sabhyas, the Ganika (accountant), the Lekhaka (Clerk) and court inspector.

- Kings at the center of the court, facing the east- Sabhyas and Pradvivka on his right facing the north side, bench clerk on the left accountant opposite the bench clerk facing west. The King acted as the supreme judge and had the final decision issued under his signature and seal.
- Pradvivakas and Sabhyas- assist the king in arriving at the truth and giving correct judgment.
- Sabhyas seven, five or three in number—selected for their knowledge of the law and they had to advise the king on laws applicable to the case. Including only the people well versed in the Vedic lore and civil law.
- Bench clerk wrote down the pleading made orally in the case.
- Accountant made calculation of money involved in the suits.
- Sadhyapala preserved the order in the court, execute its decrees and see to the attendance of parties and witnesses.

The decision of a case in ancient India was based on eight sources according to brahmanical law givers. These sources are the three Pramanas (possession, documents, and witnesses) logical inference, the usages of the country, sapathas (oaths and ordeals), the king's edict and admission of the litigants. If there were cases where no possessions, documents and recourse can be provided the decision of the King became the ultimate authority.

Four parts of a trial—

- Pratijna - plaint or complaint
- Uttaram — answer of written statement
- Kriya — Trial
- Nirnaya — Decision according to Yajnavalkya

=== Ordeals ===
Ordeals also referred to as Divya were divine methods of proof. They decided what cannot be or is not to be decided by human means of proof. The general rule stated by Yājñavalkya, Narada, Brahaspati, Katyayana is that ordeals are to be retorted to only if there is no human evidence or circumstantial evidence available. Different kinds of ordeals are mentioned at different places, Manu gives only two ordeals i.e. holding of fire and plunging in water. Yet Yājñavalkya and Vishnu give a list of five, namely balance, fire, water, poison, consecrate water. Narada gives seven different types of ordeals, i.e. ordeal by balance, fire, water, poison, libration, rice, hot piece of gold. Though there has been evidence found that shows the practice of only two ordeals i.e. ordeal by rice and ordeal by sacred libation. They show up in the sources from ancient Kashmir. In the final decisions by the King human modes of proof ruled over divine modes of proof. Ordeals were only used in extraordinary circumstances. There are also more restrictions on who can perform what type of ordeal. Ordeals were generally performed in the presence of King, the judge, learned Brahmans and the public. The place and time where the ordeals could be performed also held importance. They were usually administered either at dawn or in the forenoon or sometimes even late at night. Sunday was the preferred day to administer them. They usually took place at places like temple, royal gate, public place where four roads meet and the hall of justice. The chief judge by the order of the King had to conduct all the rites like a sacrificial priest. The chief judge and the Sodhya had to take religious dips, observe a fast and convoke all deities.

Four major ordeals

- Ordeal of balance (Tula, Dhata)—mostly given to women, minors and old or disabled people. The person performing the ordeal was twice weighed on a balance. If the person weighed lighter than the previous weight they were considered innocent; if they were heavier the second time they were considered guilty.
- Ordeal of fire (Agni)—A hot ball of iron had to be carried across a certain distance in the palm of the hand using pipul leaves. If the hand did not end up getting burnt the person was declared innocent. If the hand was burnt the person was found guilty.
- Ordeal of water (Salila)—The person had to dive into a river and keep themselves under water, while at the same time an arrow was also shot into the water and was brought back by a fleet runner. If the person stayed under water till that time and no body part was visible then the person was considered innocent. If the person floated back up again before the arrow was retrieved or a body part other than the top of the head became visible the person was found guilty.
- Ordeal of Poison (Visa)—the person had to take a certain quantity of poison and was monitored for any reactions for a certain time period. If there was no visible effect of the poison the person was considered innocent.

Other types of ordeals included ordeals mentioned in the Smrtis like the ordeal of sacred libation in which an image of a deity was washed in holy water and the accused had to drink that water. If within a certain time period a misfortune occurred in his life he was found to be guilty. Ordeal of rice grains, ordeal of heated piece of gold, ordeal by ploughshare, ordeal by lot also existed within various texts. Ordeals played a significant part in the judicial administration of ancient India, even though they were not really rational and couldn't really detect guilt. As pointed out in Medhatithi ordeals were like magic and were meant to scare the guilty party and come out with the truth.

=== Oaths ===
Oaths are an affirmation of truth which can be liable to punishment for perjury if the statement given turns out to be false. Manu recommended that when human proofs failed Sapatha or oath could be applied in search of the truth. According to the Smrti oaths were intended to be used in simple cases, while ordeals were used only in serious cases. A person making an oath was to swear on his near and dear ones. He might touch the head or feet of a Brahman or his wife or his son, or the feet of an image of a deity or take sacred grass or sesamum, silver, gold, earth, fire, water according as the value of the disputed property. The waiting period on the oaths was one, three, five or more days depending on the nature of the accusation. There is a great amount of sanctity attached to Oaths as explained in Manu that if a man swears on an oath falsely even in a small matter will be lost in this world as well as the next.
