= Vācaspati =

Rigvedic deity

Vachaspati (vāchaspati "lord of Vāc (speech)") is a Rigvedic epithet/title presiding over human life. The name is applied especially to Brhaspati, the lord of eloquence, but also to Soma, Vishvakarman and Prajapati.
