= Kaur (disambiguation) =

Kaur is the surname used by Sikh women and some Hindu women

Kaur may also refer to:

== People ==
- Achint Kaur (fl. 1994–2021), Indian actress
- Amrit Kaur (1887–1964), Indian activist and politician
- Amrit Kaur (actress) (born 1993), Canadian actress
- Amrit Kaur of Mandi (1904–1948), Indian princess
- Asees Kaur (born 1988), Indian singer
- Ashnoor Kaur (born 2004), an Indian actress
- Avneet Kaur (born 2001), an Indian actress
- Chand Kaur (1802–1842), Indian Maharani
- Charmy Kaur (born 1987), Indian film producer and actress
- Datar Kaur (1784–1838), Indian Maharani, daughter of Karmo Kaur
- Gulab Kaur (c.1890–1941), Indian freedom fighter
- Gursharan Kaur (born 1937), Indian history professor, mother of Upinder Kaur
- Harmanpreet Kaur (born 1989), Indian cricketer
- Harshdeep Kaur (born 1986), Indian playback singer
- Jasleen Kaur (born 1986), Scottish artist
- Judith Kaur (born 1945), American oncologist
- Karmo Kaur (died 1806), Indian regent of Naka Misl, mother of Datar Kaur
- Larissa Kaur (born 1941), Estonian ballerina
- Man Kaur (1916–2021), Indian track-and-field athlete
- Max Kaur (born 1969), Estonian politician
- Parwinder Kaur, Indian-born biotechnologist
- Parveen Kaur (Canadian actress)
- Parveen Kaur (Indian actress)
- Rupi Kaur (born 1992), Canadian poet
- Satvir Kaur, British politician
- Surinder Kaur (1929–2006), Indian singer and songwriter
- Upinder Kaur/Singh, daughter of Gursharan Kaur
- Ash Kaur, a fictional character from EastEnders
- Kaur (given name), Estonian masculine given name

== Other uses ==
- Kaur, The Gambia, a city in The Gambia
- Kaur language, Malayic language on Sumatra
- KAUR (satellite bus), a satellite bus designed and manufactured by ISS Reshetnev
