= Amar Singh (art dealer) =

Art dealer

- Born: Kanwar Amar Jit Singh; 14 June 1989 (age 37); London, England, UK
- Known for: Art dealer, women's rights and LGBTQ+ activist

Kanwar Amar Jit Singh (born 14 June 1989) is a British art dealer and women's rights and LGBTQ+ activist. Singh is a member of the erstwhile Kapurthala royal family through his direct lineage to Raja Nihal Singh.

In addition to art dealing, Singh later included NFTs (digital art) into his dealing. Throughout his career, Singh has emphasised underrepresented female, LGBTQ+ and minority artists.

== Education ==
Singh was educated at St John's Beaumont School and Charterhouse School.

== Career ==
On 20 January 2017, Singh opened the Amar Gallery in London located close to the Central Saint Martins campus in North London. The gallery's inaugural exhibition was 'LINKS', by Howard Tangye, an artist who was the fashion illustration tutor and former head of womenswear at Central Saint Martins. The physical gallery space located between King's Cross and Islington, was closed in April 2019. In the two years the gallery space was open to the public, the Amar Gallery exhibited the work of female artists and feminists including the Guerrilla Girls, Helen Frankenthaler & Grace Hartigan The Amar Gallery also mounted LGBT+ exhibitions including 'LINKS' by Tangye and 'Section 377', an online exhibition about the road to legalise homosexuality in India. After the closure of the physical Amar Gallery space featuring traditional art, Singh moved to virtual art and NFTs. In June 2021, Singh partnered with Givenchy and VeVe to raise $128,000 for LGBT+ youth movement Le MAG Jeunes LGBT+, by collaborating with artists Rewind Collective and selling the first NFT created for a beauty brand.

In 2019, Singh had stated his next venture, set to open in October 2019, was Curated Golden Square, described as a "$100 million, 30,000 square foot apartment hotel". In a 2021 follow up interview with Vanity Fair, Singh claimed that the COVID-19 pandemic was the reason the venture did not move forward.

In March 2021, SABO Art and Amar Singh Gallery launched an art exhibition to celebrate women and Women's History Month in Lagos, Nigeria.

In 2021 Singh pledged to donate $5 million worth of art by female, LGBTQ and minority artists to museums worldwide. To date Singh or his gallery have donated works of art to museums including LACMA, Harvard, National Portrait Gallery, London, the Crocker Museum, the Studio Museum, Stedelijk Museum. and the New Orleans Museum of Art. Works of art have also been donated in Singh's honour or courtesy of Singh's gallery to the Whitney Museum, ICA Miami. and Smithsonian. In 2022, he also pledged to donate $1 million to international women's rights non-profit Vital Voices, where he was a member of the solidarity council, until October 2023.

Singh reopened his London gallery in June 2024 with a solo exhibition of works by Dora Maar, Picasso's muse and lover. Singh told the Guardian of Dora Maar: “She influenced Picasso to paint Guernica – he had never entered political painting before.” In January 2025, Singh staged the UK's first ever solo exhibition of works by artist Hélène de Beauvoir who had long been overshadowed by her more famous sister, writer Simone de Beauvoir.

== Activism ==
Since 2020, Singh has been working with Manvendra Singh Gohil, Ankita Surabhi, and human rights lawyer Ravi Kant who worked on the honor killing case Shakti Vahini vs Union of India (2018), on an Indian Supreme Court case to nationally and comprehensively make conversion therapy illegal in India. At present, the precedent set by Madras High Court's S Sushma v. Commissioner of Police (2021), prohibited conversion therapy in India, forced the Ministry of Social Justice and Empowerment to provide 'shelter homes' for LGBTQ protection, and suggested that the government create education programs 'to sensitize police and prison authorities, district and state legal service authorities, health professionals, educational institutions, and most importantly, parents of LGBTQIA+ members'. However, the only protection against conversion therapy is limited to the Mental Healthcare Act, 2017, prohibiting medical discrimination against patients on the basis of gender and sexual orientation, limiting liability to state and mental health professionals, but not prohibiting the community or parents from enacting conversion therapy on members of LGBTQIA+ members.

In July 2019, Singh spoke at the Congressional Hispanic Leadership Institute's Annual Future Leaders Conference, held at the Russell Senate Office Building, about women's rights and how communities are impacted through art and culture.

Singh has been critical of a lack of LGBT rights in Brunei, branding the country's laws punishing homosexuality with death by stoning as 'disgraceful'.

== Personal life ==
Through his father, Singh is a great-great-great-great-grandson of Raja Nihal Singh of Kapurthala.

A 2017 Los Angeles Blade article reported that Indian politician Vishvjit Singh was Singh's uncle; Vishvjit instead was Singh's first cousin once removed. Although, as stated in The Hindu newspaper, it is customary in India to refer to elder relatives or elders in general as Uncle and Aunt.

In 2018, The Independent claimed that Singh, who is heterosexual, was "driven out of India" at the age of 20, after he spoke out in support of gay rights.

Ancestors of Amar Singh (art dealer)

64. Raja Nihal Singh
32. Bikrama Singh
16. Pratap Singh
8. Jasjit Singh
4. Manjit Singh
2. Aniljit Singh
Amar Singh
6. Balram Bisram
3. Padma Bisram
