= Harnam Singh =

Kapurthalian royal (1851–1930)

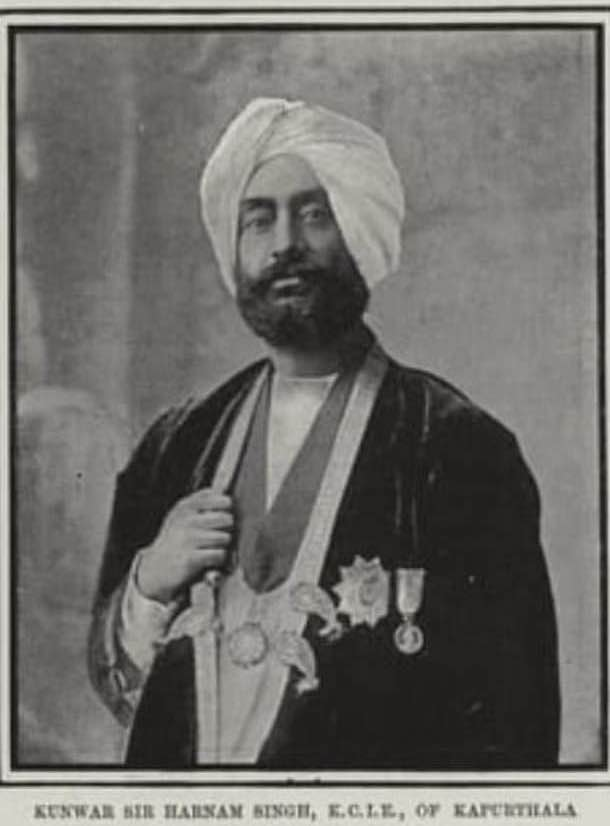
Photograph of Kunwar Sir Harnam Singh Ahluwalia of Kapurthala State, circa late 19th century

Raja Sir Harnam Singh Ahluwalia , KCIE (15 November 1851 – 20 May 1930) was a member of the Kapurthala royal family in the direct line founded by Jassa Singh Ahluwalia.

He was the first president of the All India Conference of Indian Christians, which played an important role in the Indian independence movement, advocating for swaraj and opposition to India's partition. He was also a member of the Kapurthala Council of State and one of the founder trustees of the Tribune Newspaper. He also was a 1906 founding patron of the New India Insurance company founded in Calcutta under the Swaraj movement. It was later nationalised, India's 4th largest Insurance Company National Insurance Company.

== Biography ==
Harnam Singh was the second son of Raja Sir Randhir Singh Ahluwalia, GCSI, Raja of Kapurthala, and younger brother of Raja Kharak Singh Ahluwalia. He left Kapurthala in 1878 after the premature death of his elder brother and power struggle for the succession to the Kapurthala throne. Under the influence of his English Tutor Rev. Woodside and aided by a Bengali Missionary Golaknath Chatterji, Harnam Singh converted to Christianity, renouncing his rights to succession.

Raja Harnam Singh held many dignities in his life. He was a member of the Legislative Council for the Punjab from 1900 to 1902, a Member of the Kapurthala Council of State and an honorary Fellow of Panjab University. In 1902 he and his wife were in London to attend the Coronation of King Edward VII and Queen Alexandra, as representatives of the Christian community in India.

He was appointed a Companion of the Order of the Indian Empire (CIE) in 1885 and knighted as a Knight Commander of the order (KCIE) in 1898. In 1907, Harnam Singh was given the personal title of Raja (roughly equivalent to the modern British life peerage), and he was made a hereditary Raja in 1911, thus enabling him to found a separate branch of the Ahluwalia dynasty. He was given the administration of his Awadh properties for his lifetime; objections by Jagatjit Singh were for naught.

Harnam Singh died in 1930 at the age of 78, and was succeeded in his title by his eldest son, Raghubir Singh. Raghbir dying two years later without issue resulted in continuing survival of the title upon his second surviving son, Raja Maharaj Singh.

== Family ==
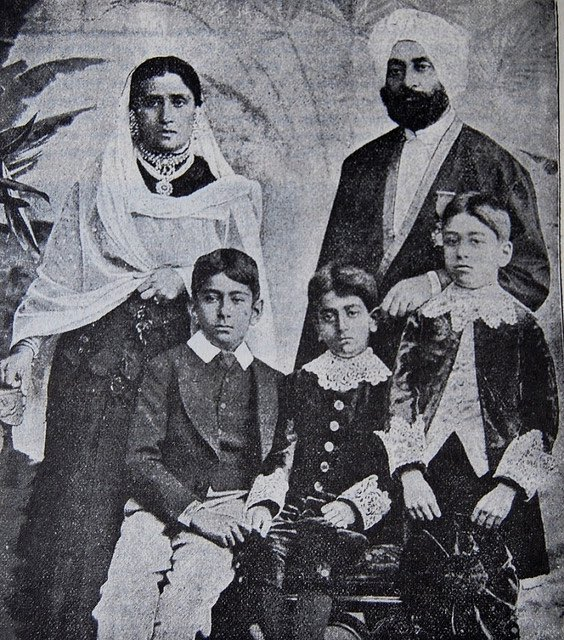
Photograph of Kunwar Sir Harnam Singh Ahluwalia of Kapurthala State with his family, circa late 19th century

In 1875, he married Rani Priscilla Kaur Sahiba (née Priscilla Golaknath), and had nine children, seven sons and two daughters:

1. Raja Raghbhir Singh, OBE (3 May 1876 – 17 November 1932)
2. Kanwar Rajendra Singh (1877–1883)
3. Raja Sir Maharaj Singh, CIE, CStJ (17 May 1878 – 6 June 1959), who had issue (see article)
4. Lieutenant Colonel Dr. Kanwar Shamsher Singh, M.D., MRCS, LRCP (21 June 1879–?)
5. Captain Dr. Kanwar Indrajit Singh, MC, M.D., MRCP (27 December 1883 – 23 November 1914) (KIA)
6. Kanwar Sir Dalip Singh (2 June 1885 – 13 January 1971)
7. Kanwar Jasbir Singh, CIE (16 June 1887 – 15 October 1942), who had issue including:
  - Air Vice Marshal Kanwar Jaswant Singh, PVSM (1915–1963)
  - Lieutenant Kanwar Billy Arjan Singh (1917–2010)
8. Rajkumari Bibiji Amrit Kaur, DStJ (2 February 1889 – 9 February 1964)
9. Bibi Raj Kaur (29 May 1882 – 29 May 1882)

== Titles ==
- 1852–1885: Kanwar Harnam Singh
- 1885–1898: Kanwar Harnam Singh, Ahluwalia, CIE
- 1898–1900: Kanwar Sir Harnam Singh Bahadur, KCIE
- 1900–1907: The Hon Kanwar Sir Harnam Singh Bahadur, KCIE
- 1907–1930: The Hon Raja Shri Sir Harnam Singh, KCIE

== Honours ==
- Knight Commander of the Order of the Indian Empire (KCIE – 1898) (CIE – 1885)
- Prince of Wales's Medal in silver – 1876
- KIH Silver Medal – 1877
- Queen Victoria Golden Jubilee Medal – 1887
- King Edward VII Coronation Medal in silver – 1902
- Delhi Durbar Medal in silver – 1903
- Personal title of Raja – 1907
- Delhi Durbar Medal in silver – 1911
- Hereditary title of Raja – 1911

== See also ==
- The Kapurthala Royal Collateral Families
- Rajkumari Bibiji Amrit Kaur
- Billy Arjan Singh
- Bikrama Singh
- Vishvjit Singh
- Pratap Singh
