= Pratap Singh of Kapurthala =

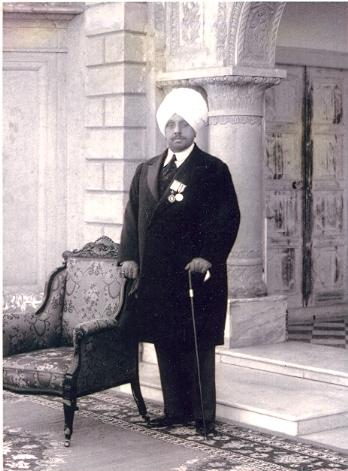
Kanwar Pratap Singh Bahadur

Colonel The Honourable Kanwar Pratap Singh Bahadur of Kapurthala (1871-5 December 1911) was a Punjabi politician and scholar.

== Biography ==
The son of Bikrama Singh of Kapurthala, Pratap Singh was an honorary magistrate and civil judge in Punjab. He served as a member of the Punjab Legislative Council from 1906 to 1911 and the Imperial Legislative Council 1910–1911. He was a founder of the Punjab Chiefs' Association.

Actively involved in the Sikh renaissance movement, Pratap Singh was a scholar of history and religion and was an eminent musicologist of his time.

== Awards ==
- 1909: Commander of the Order of the Star of India
- 1911 (posthumous): Knight Commander of Order of the Star of India

== See also ==
- Ahluwalia (misl)
- Harnam Singh
- The Kapurthala Royal Collateral Families
- Rajkumari Amrit Kaur
- Billy Arjan Singh
- Bikrama Singh
- Vishvjit Singh

== Sources ==
- Sir Lepel Grifin – Rajas of the Punjab. 1873
- Griffin & Massey – Chiefs and Families of Note in the Punjab 1909
- Challenge and response (1849–1873) by Harbans Singh published in the Sikh Spectrum.com Monthly Issue No.11, April 2003 https://web.archive.org/web/20071012010324/http://www.sikhspectrum.com/042003/challenges.htm
