= Raja Maharaj Singh =

Indian cricketer

Raja Sir Maharaj Singh CIE CStJ
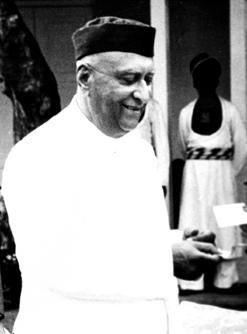
- Singh at a baseball match in Bombay in 1949

Vice Chancellor of Lucknow University
- In office 1941
- Preceded by: Bahadur Sir Sri Muhammad Habibullah Sahib
- Succeeded by: Lieutenant Colonel Raja Visheshwar Dayal Seth

Governor of Bombay
- In office 6 January 1948 – 30 May 1952
- Preceded by: John Colville (of Bombay Presidency)
- Succeeded by: Girija Shankar Bajpai

Personal details
- Born: May 17, 1878
- Died: June 6, 1959 (aged 81)
- Parent: Raja Harnam Singh
- Education: Harrow School; Balliol College, Oxford; Middle Temple
- Occupation: Administrator

Raja Sir Maharaj Singh CIE CStJ (17 May 1878, Kapurthala, Punjab – 6 June 1959, Lucknow) was the first Indian Governor of Bombay. He was also the Prime Minister of Jammu and Kashmir during Maharaja Hari Singh's rule and also the Dewan of Jodhpur for a short while. Raja Sir Maharaja Singh served as the president of the All India Conference of Indian Christians (AICIC) in the 1940s.

== Life ==
Maharaj Singh was the second son of Raja Harnam Singh of the Kapurthala royal family, a direct descendant of Jassa Singh Ahluwalia. His mother was Rani Priscilla Kaur Sahiba (née Priscilla Golaknath). Maharaj Singh's father, Harnam Singh, had converted to Christianity under the influence of his English tutor, Rev. Woodside, and with strong encouragement from the Bengali missionary Golaknath Chatterjee. After conversion, Harnam Singh had married Priscilla, daughter of Golaknath Chatterjee, who was of Bengali Brahmin heritage and a convert to Christianity. Due to his conversion, Harnam Singh was given many important government positions by the British Indian government. Maharaj Singh was one of the nine children - seven sons and two daughters - born to this couple. Among his siblings was Rajkumari Amrit Kaur, the prominent Congress politician who served as Minister of Health in the Nehru government after independence.

Maharaj Singh was educated at Harrow School and Balliol College, Oxford, where he completed his MA, and was called to Bar by the Middle Temple in 1902. Starting off as the Deputy Collector of United Provinces, he held several positions in the government of India, just like his father. He was elected as the Vice Chancellor of the esteemed University of Lucknow in 1941, where he contributed to the institution's legacy of academic excellence. Additionally, he served for a brief period as the Prime Minister of Kashmir, playing a significant role during a pivotal time in the region's history.

Raja Sir Maharaja Singh served as the president of the AICIC in the 1940s, which under his tenure championed a united India, advocated for swaraj, and demanded the release by Great Britain of Indian political prisoners. He was appointed the Governor of Bombay from 1948 to 1952. The Test cricketer Rusi Modi served as his ADC while he was the governor of Bombay. Maharaj Singh was appointed a CIE in 1915 and knighted in 1933.

Married to Gunwati Maya Das of Ferozepore, Maharaj Singh had two sons, Raja Ranbir Singh, a diplomat (died June 1995) and Kanwar Mahindar Singh, a tennis player and businessman based in Chandigarh (died August 2004), as well as a daughter, Prem Maharaj Seth (née Singh) (died September 2019).

At the age of 72, Maharaj Singh captained the Bombay Governor's XI against a touring Commonwealth XI in a cricket match starting on 25 November 1950. This makes him the oldest cricketer to make his first-class debut and the oldest player to play a first-class game. Coming in to bat at No. 9, he edged Jim Laker for 3 and one run later, was caught at first slip off the same bowler. Laker was 44 years younger than the man he dismissed. Maharaj Singh took no part in the game after the first day, and Yadavindra Singh of Patiala, another royal from Punjab, captained the side in his absence.

== Titles ==
- 1878–1915: Kanwar Maharaj Singh
- 1915–1932: Kanwar Maharaj Singh, CIE
- 1932–1933: Raja Maharaj Singh, CIE
- 1933–1937: Raja Sir Maharaj Singh, CIE
- 1937–1959: Raja Sir Maharaj Singh, CIE, CStJ
- 1948–1952: His Excellency Sri Sir Maharaj Singh, CIE, CStJ, Governor of the State of Bombay

== Honours ==
(ribbon bar, as it would look today)

- Companion of the Order of the Indian Empire (CIE)-1915
- Knight Bachelor-1933
- King George V Silver Jubilee Medal-1935
- Commander of the Order of St John (CStJ)-1937
- King George VI Coronation Medal-1937
- Indian Independence Medal-1948

Political offices
Preceded by John Colville	Governor of Bombay; 1948–1952	Succeeded by Sir Girija Shankar Bajpai
