= Andrew Maxwell Morris =

English singer, songwriter and composer

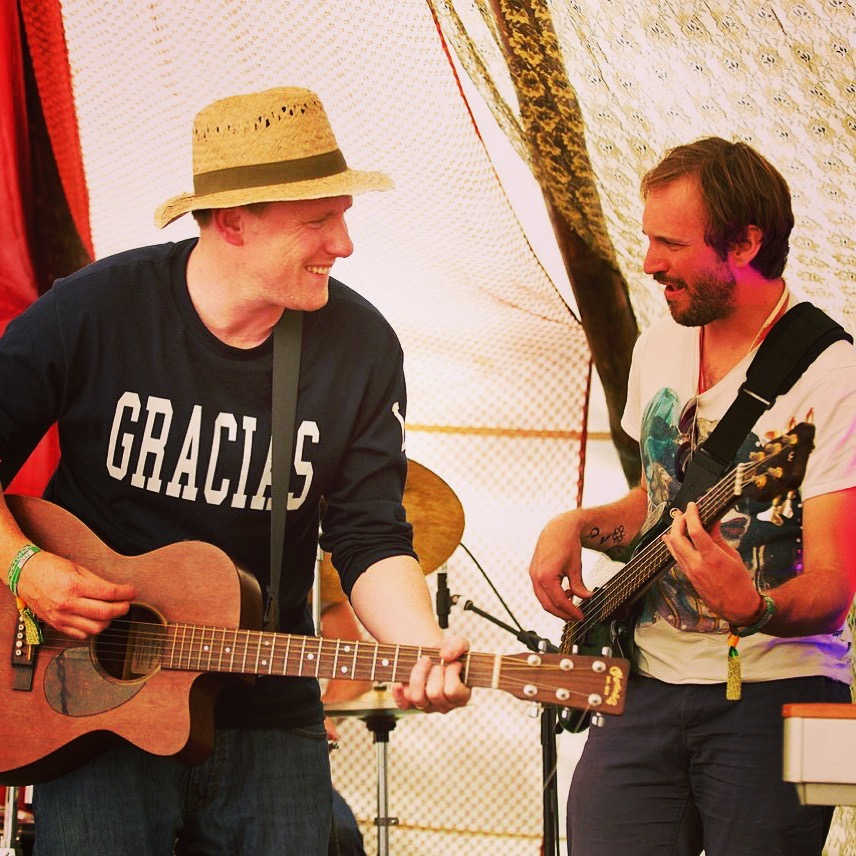
Andrew Maxwell Morris performing at Glastonbury in June 2015

Andrew Maxwell Morris is an English singer, songwriter and composer.

== Early life ==
Andrew Maxwell Morris was born in Melbourne Australia in 1980 in Sandringham Hospital. His father was a mechanical engineer who had emigrated to Australia from England in the 1960's as a Ten Pound Pom. His mother was born in Dundalk in 1950. In 1975 both his mother and father emigrated to South Africa and lived in Johannesburg where his brother was born in 1978. In 1979 his parents were forced to leave their home in South Africa and moved back to Melbourne in 1980. At the age of 4, Andrew moved with his family to Suva in Fiji where his father worked teaching refrigeration. Whilst in Fiji, Andrew attended the Suva Grammar school. At the age of 8, he returned to Melbourne with his family. The family then emigrated to England where Andrew attended St John's Beaumont School and Stonyhurst College. Andrew learnt the piano at the age of 4, and taught himself guitar and drums at the age of 13.

He performed his first live concert at the Cellar Bar in Blackburn in 1995, aged 15. The guitarist in Andrew's band 'Peregrine', Gareth Mather died at the age of 20 when on holiday in Barcelona.

Between the ages of 13 and 21 Andrew lived in a variety of countries where his father worked as a pipeline mechanical engineer where he played and recorded in various folk bands. In the 1990's he lived in Jeddah in Saudi Arabia and in Kuala Lumpur and Singapore. He spent 18 months living in Brunei on the island of Borneo and 8 years living in Muscat in Oman. He was injured in an accident in Kapas Island in Malaysia where he slipped and fell off a rock face and cut his right arm, where he was treated with 22 stitches and was rescued by local guides.

== Supporting tours ==
Morris has supported the rock band Marillion on two separate tours. Most notably a UK national tour in February 2009 and at the Marillion Convention from 20 to 23 March 2009 in Zeebrugge, Holland. He has also supported the blues guitarist Peter Green with his band Peter Green and Friends on his national UK tour in December 2009 and February/March 2010.

== Glastonbury appearances ==
Andrew Morris performed at the Glastonbury Festival every year between 2008 and 2025.

He has performed at a variety of stages at the Festival including Toad Hall, Mandala, Bimble Inn, Bread and Roses, Avalon Café, Tadpole Stage and small world stage.

His performance in 2010 was featured in The Independent.

His appearance in 2014 was nominated as a top 30 moment by Consequence of Sound.

He was nominated by Consequence of Sound for his performance in 2015.

His performance in 2016 was featured in Best New Bands.

== Music Placements ==
His song "100 Reasons" was placed by Vodafone in a television advertising campaign for 4G in March 2014 which ran for approximately one year.

His song "Dust" was placed in an ITV advert for Thatchers Cider between 2010 and 2013, the brand's first television advert.

His songs "I'll be Gone", "Dust" and "Let it go" were both used as theme songs for the hit Russian TV series Kitchen, Hotel Eleon and Grand, all of which were aired between 2012–present on STS.

== Chart Positions ==
"Let it go" and "Dust" peaked at 3 and 4 on the iTunes Singer/Songwriter Genre Chart in Russia and at number 5 on the iTunes genre chart in Ukraine. "On a Rainbow" peaked at number 5 on the iTunes Genre Chart in Taiwan.

His 2014 Album "Well Tread Roads" peaked at number 2 on the iTunes Charts in Belgium and number 4 on the iTunes chart in Switzerland in 2019.

== Releases ==
=== EPs ===
- 2007 - Upside Down
- 2009 - Long Beach

=== Albums ===
- 2014 - Well Tread Roads
- 2020 - Save The Light
- 2022 - Andrew Maxwell Morris( three tracks on this album were produced by Dave Meegan)
