= Kaur (given name) =

- Gender: Male
- Language: Estonian
- Name day: 30 September

Origin
- Region of origin: Estonia

Kaur is an Estonian masculine given name and occasional surname derived from the given name and may refer to:

- Kaur Alttoa (born 1947), Estonian historian
- Kaur Kender (born 1971), Estonian author
- Kaur Kivila (born 2003), Estonian footballer
- Kaur Kivistik (born 1991), Estonian track and field athlete
- Kaur Kuslap (born 1990), Estonian rower

Surname

- Egon Kaur (born 1987), Estonian rally driver
- Max Kaur (born 1969), Estonian politician
