= Khambra =

Village in Punjab, India

Khambra is a village situated on National Highway 71 in the Indian Punjab, 7 km from the city of Jalandhar. It covers 288 hectares, and has seen development and improvement since the early 1990s, its population increasing from 3157 in 2001. It has Government high school which also services 8 nearby villages, water supplies to each household, metalled roads, and two charitable hospitals with accident and emergency services. The Panchayat (elders) hold a strong influence over the village, with three Gurdwaras, (places of worship), that organize Kirtan Darbars (devotional singing), and Satsangs (reading and discussion of scriptures). Landmarks close to Khambra include a TV mast and the Wonderland theme park.
