= Hélène de Beauvoir =

French painter (1910 – 2001)

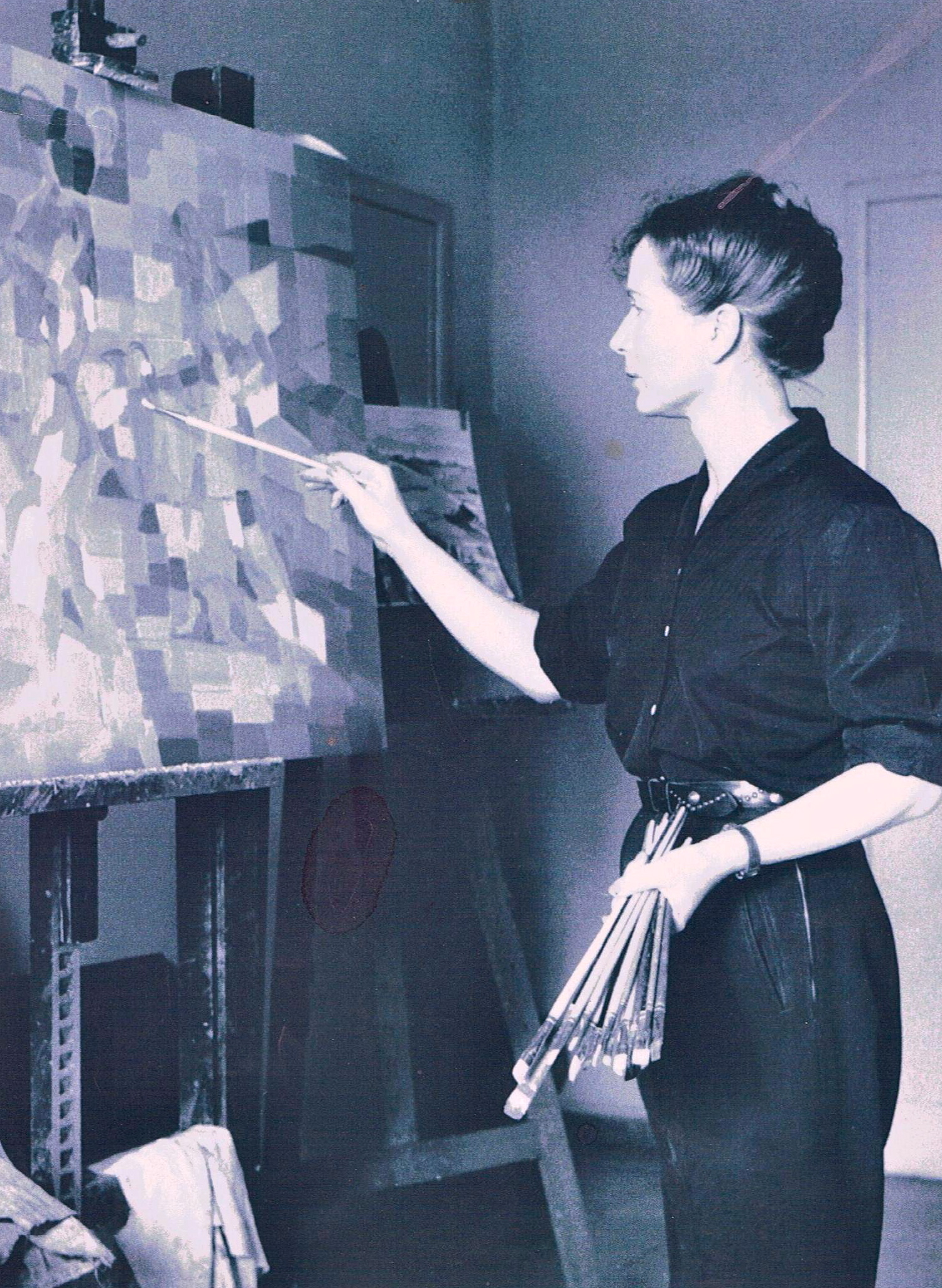
- Born: Henriette-Hélène de Beauvoir; 6 June 1910; Paris, France
- Died: 1 July 2001 (aged 91); Goxwiller, France
- Occupation: Painter
- Spouse: Lionel de Roulet
- Relatives: Simone de Beauvoir (sister)

Henriette-Hélène de Beauvoir (French pronunciation: [ɑ̃ʁjɛt elɛn də bovwaʁ]; 6 June 1910 – 1 July 2001) was a French painter. She was the younger sister of philosopher Simone de Beauvoir.

== Early Years ==
Hélène de Beauvoir was born on June 6, 1910 in Paris to an aristocratic family. Her parents, Georges Bertrand de Beauvoir and Françoise Beauvoir, had hoped for a son and often devoted more attention to her older sister, Simone. Hélène attended Cours Désir, a private Catholic school for young girls, with her sister Simone. At school, Hélène already displayed a rebellious spirit when she became editor and illustrator of “L’Écho du Cours Desir,” a student publication that made fun of classes and teachers.

== Education ==
Hélène's parents were far more lenient with Simone's intellectual pursuits, and initially refused to allow Hélène to take the agrégation. With Simone's help, however, the two sisters lobbied against their parents until they relented.

Hélène's parents enrolled her in an art school which proved unserious, teaching only decorative arts and attended by women who painted only until they found a husband. Eventually, Hélène was permitted to study at the Art et Publicité school on the rue de Fleurus, very close to her family home. Unlike her previous school, these classes were populated by students from the lower classes, who were painting to earn a living. There, she studied woodcuts, etchings, oil paintings, and life drawing with nude male models. This school was where Hélène's passion for art was solidified.

Because she was financially responsible for her own materials and courses, Hélène worked as a secretary at an art gallery, while also taking on odd jobs, such as designing labels for cans and bottles. Despite her efforts, her limited income forced her to live at home. Eventually, Hélène rented a studio in the 5th arrondissement of Paris, with Simone helping to pay the rent. Her first exhibition opened in January 1936, when she was twenty-five years old, at the Galerie Bonjean. Pablo Picasso was in attendance and praised the originality of her work.

== Middle Years ==
Hélène became involved in a relationship with the writer Jean Giraudoux. Later, she and Simone met Lionel de Roulet by chance in a compartment of the Paris-Rouen train. Lionel, a student of Jean-Paul Sartre, soon became close with Hélène and, after her relationship with Giraudoux ended, the two began a relationship of their own. Unfortunately, Lionel contracted tuberculosis of the bone (Pott's disease), so was sent to a treatment center in Berck.

When WWII broke out, Hélène went away to one of her family's country homes. When Germany invaded France, Hélène was with Lionel in Portugal as he recovered from his operation. In Portugal, Hélène taught French at a lycée, while Lionel covertly worked with the Free France forces. In December 1942, the couple married in Lisbon.

After the Liberation, the couple returned briefly to Paris before Lionel was appointed director of information in Vienna. To accompany her husband to Soviet-controlled Vienna, Hélène, now holding the rank of lieutenant, was given the post of decorator of the French Information Center in Vienna. The couple's diplomatic life then took them to Belgrade, Casablanca, and Morocco before they eventually settled in Milan for eight years. The couple returned once more to Paris before finally setting up their home in Goxwiller.

Even while moving around with Lionel, Hélène exhibited her paintings widely. In France and Germany during the 1950s and 1960s, and in New York by the 1970s. In 1968, Hélène first showed in Asia at the Natenshi Gallery in Tokyo.

== Activism ==
Hélène had long been frustrated by the sexism of the art world: women's painting was often dismissed as a hobby, women were barred from painting nude models, and the great female artists of history were rarely recognized or granted exhibitions of their own.

The turning point for Hélène's activism seems to have come during the summer of 1968. The student revolts and widespread rejection of established authority inspired her rebellious series of paintings titled “Le Joli Mois de Mai” (The Lovely Month of May).

In 1975, Hélène was further radicalized by the murders of four women in Strasbourg, who had been killed by their husbands, one of whom thrown out of a window. So while Simone was leading the MLF in Paris, Hélène became involved in feminist activism in Alsace, serving as president of the SOS Femmes Alsace association, a center for battered women. Hélène also testified in court in defense of a woman accused of killing her baby after being raped by a married man. She continued to testify in trials defending women.

Along with Simone, Hélène signed the Manifesto of the 343, a petition demanding the legalization of abortion.

== Later Years ==
Hélène and Lionel de Roulet never had children of their own, but they adopted the son of a friend named Sandro, who came to think of the Roulets as his grandparents.

On April 14, 1986, Hélène received a call from Sylvie le Bon de Beauvoir informing her that Simone had died. In mourning, Hélène painted Portrait of Simone in a Red Jacket. Lionel died a few years later in 1990.

Hélène returned to Portugal for the opening of three exhibits devoted to her paintings from the Portuguese period, organized by the University of Aveiro. She then donated many paintings to the university for the creation of a museum bearing her name.

In her final years of life, Hélène remained at her home in Goxwiller as her health declined; she died on July 1, 2001.

== Sisters ==
Simone and Hélène de Beauvoir remained close throughout their lives, influencing one another personally and creatively. In her memoirs, Simone affectionately refers to Hélène as “Poupette,” and she dedicated A Very Easy Death to her sister after the two shared the grief of their mother's painful death. Simone also named a character in The Blood of Others after Hélène. The sisters collaborated for the first time on The Women Destroyed, which was published in Elle Magazine and featured engravings by Hélène to accompany Simone's text.

== Painting ==
=== Mourning ===
After the death of her sister, Hélène entered a period of intense grief that shaped her art. One important work from this period is “Portrait de Simone de Veste Rouge” (Portrait of Simone in a Red Jacket), 1986. Hélène describes this period of grief in an interview: “Enfermée dans mon atelier, pleurant, je peignis ceux qui ont nom: mes tableaux de deuil. Le premier, celui qui me coûta le plus de larmes fut: ‘La grande séparation”. On y voit une blonde tenter de retenir une brune, mais inexorablement la brune s’éloigne, happée par le vide. Je m’arrêtais. Il m’avait épuisée."

=== Revolution ===
Hélène's political engagement is visible in her series of thirty paintings titled “Le Joli Mois de Mai” (The Lovely Month of May), which were inspired by the student revolts of May 1968 in Paris. Initially, a Right Bank gallery agreed to exhibit the series, but later withdrew after being shocked by the paintings’ violent and revolutionary spirit. The works were eventually shown at a gallery in Montmartre on the rue Véron.

=== Nature ===
In Hélène's paintings, women are often connected to the natural world and animals. As scholar Gloria Orenstein observes of the paintings, “Women tame a jaguar, sleep with ‘superb and generous’ lions, communicate with birds, goats, elephants, tigers, horses, and flowers. Women dream of animals, and encounter them in mythic and symbolic spaces.” Hélène feared the destruction of nature by technology, especially when aligned with patriarchy. Her environmental concerns led her to protest nuclear power plants.

=== Feminism ===
Hélène's feminist activism and work with SOS Femmes Alsace deeply informed her later paintings. Her experiences testifying in court on behalf of women inspired works that portray women as scapegoats in a modern continuation of the witch hunts. This theme appears in paintings such as “Les Femmes Souffrent, Les Hommes Jugent” (Women Suffer, Men Judge Them), 1977 and “La Chasse Aux Sorcières Continue” (The Witch Hunt is Still On), 1977. At the same time, Hélène's art celebrates female solidarity, as seen in works like “Hommage à la Libération des Femmes” (Tribute to Women's Liberation), 1977.

In January 2025, art dealer Amar Singh staged the first UK solo exhibition of Hélène de Beauvoir's work at Amar Gallery. Harper's Bazaar writing about the exhibition stated "The show offers a mere glimpse through the keyhole of her expansive artistry, but it's the most we’ve ever seen of de Beauvoir in this country: jewel-like landscapes, teetering on the brink of abstraction; canvases smeared with energy and passion."

== Sources ==
- Monteil Claudine, Les Sœurs Beauvoir, Editions no 1, Paris, 2003.
