= Ravi Kant (lawyer) =

Ravi Kant is an Indian Supreme Court advocate and president of the anti-trafficking non-governmental organization Shakti Vahini, named after the Hindu mother goddess who fought injustice.

He was educated at St. Vincent's High and Technical School and Delhi University.

In 2013, Kant and his two brothers received Vital Voices Solidarity Award from then Vice President Joe Biden for their work on combating sexual violence in India. The award recognizes Kant and his brothers efforts to end violence against women and was presented to them at Vital Voices' annual ceremony at the Kennedy Center in Washington, D.C. on 4 April 2013

Kant was Selected for the prestigious International Visitors Leadership Programme by the US State Department in 2013. kant also presented a paper strengthening legislations to combat Violence Against Women before the Tom Lantos Human Rights Commission, US Senate

In 2018, Kant represented Shakti Vahini in the Landmark Case Shakti Vahini vs Union of India which resulted in Supreme Court laying down guidelines to combat honor related crimes in India. In this landmark judgement the Supreme Court upheld therRight to choice of marriage.

In 2020, he began working with Amar Singh on a Supreme Court case to ban LGBTQ conversion therapy. At present, the precedent set by Madras High Court's S Sushma v. Commissioner of Police (2021), prohibited conversion therapy in India, directed the Ministry of Social Justice and Empowerment to provide 'shelter homes' for LGBTQ protection, and directed the to government create education programs 'to sensitize police and prison authorities, district and state legal service authorities, health professionals, educational institutions, and most importantly, parents of LGBTQIA+ members'.

However, the only protection against conversion therapy is limited to the Mental Healthcare Act, 2017, prohibiting medical discrimination against patients on the basis of gender and sexual orientation, limiting liability to state and mental health professionals, but not prohibiting the community or parents from enacting conversion therapy on members of LGBTQIA+ members.

Since 2022, Kant has led the Access to Justice Project in India an alliance of 250 NGOs working for the thematic areas of child abuse, child trafficking and child marriage

In February 2024, Kant was appointed as the National Convenor of Just Rights for Children Alliance

In February 2025, Kant attended the SHIELD Cyber Security Conclave where he gave a call for action to combat CSEAM cases terming it as organized crime
