= VeVe =

Digital collectible marketplace from ECOMI

- VeVe logo since 2023
- Website type: Private
- Available in: English
- Headquarters: Auckland, New Zealand
- Area served: Worldwide
- Owners: VeVe, Inc.
- Founders: David Yu; Dan Crothers
- CEO: David Yu
- Revenue: Freemium
- Website: www.veve.me
- Launched: 2018

VeVe is a New Zealand-based company specializing in licensed digital collectibles. The company has mobile apps available for Android and iOS devices, as well as a web app, where users can purchase digital collectibles and view them in AR & VR. VeVe has the distinction of being the first marketplace to offer NFTs from prominent brands such as Marvel, Disney and DC.

== History ==
VeVe was founded by Dan Crothers and David Yu in 2018.

VeVe has formed several partnerships with major licensors to offer unique digital collectibles to its users, utilizing non-fungible token (NFT) technology.

In June 2021, VeVe collaborated with Givenchy to release a series of NFT art pieces by Amar Singh to support LGBTQIA+ causes.

Later, in August 2021, VeVe partnered with Marvel Entertainment to release the first-ever NFT of Spider-Man. VeVe also partnered with Star Trek in September 2021 to offer NFTs based on iconic starships, such as the Enterprise-D and Borg Cube.

In November 2021, VeVe collaborated with the United States Postal Service to create NFT stamp collectibles commemorating the Day of the Dead holiday, followed by a Christmas-themed set released in December of the same year.

Additionally, VeVe partnered with Disney in November 2021 to release a series of NFT collectibles called "Golden Moments," featuring beloved characters from Disney, Pixar, Marvel, and Star Wars.

VeVe also teamed up with Lamborghini in February 2023 to release a set of 3D digital collectibles based on the Huracán STO line of sports cars.

In July 2023, VeVe partnered with Kartoon Studios to release digital collectibles of Stan Lee, which sold out nearly instantly.

VeVe has also partnered with brands on physical/digital collaborations ("phygitals") where customers who purchase a physical product receive a digital counterpart. In September 2023, VeVe partnered with Funko on an Iron Man collectible with a digital counterpart available via promo code. In October 2023, VeVe released a phygital collaboration with Christian Louboutin and Marvel for their "Loubiverse" collection.

At SXSW in 2024, VeVe and Marvel announced the release of a new app called VeVe Comics, where users can purchase digital versions of new comic releases on the same day that the physicals are released in store.

VeVe has also launched a sub-brand called "VeVeVibes" for IP related to the music category. In May 2024, they announced a collaboration with YG Entertainment to bring digital collectibles for Blackpink to the platform. VeVeVibes has also released several songs from the artist Ron English as digital records that can be played on a virtual jukebox.

In September 2024, VeVe brought on former Binance General Manager, Ben Rose, as Co-CEO to manage communications and user growth.

== Controversy ==
VeVe has received some criticism for their use of blockchain technology. In February 2022, Chaosium, the makers of Call of Cthulhu, suspended the production of their NFTs on VeVe following criticism from some of their user base.

VeVe also received criticism from some fans of Sesame Street in March 2023 when they partnered with Sesame Workshop to release an animated digital collectible of the Cookie Monster, with fans criticizing the environmental impact of NFTs. However, VeVe NFTs are minted on the Immutable X blockchain which purports to be 100% carbon-neutral.

== Awards ==
VeVe was recognized as one of the 2023 Deloitte Fast 50 by Deloitte for "reinventing the collectibles industry". VeVe co-founder, David Yu, was also recognized as the Entrepreneur of the Year New Zealand by Ernst & Young in 2023.
