= Daljit Singh (Sikh politician) =

Sikh politician

Raja Sir Daljit Singh

Member of the Imperial Legislative Council
- In office 1913–1915

Member of the Council of State
- In office 1915–1917

Member of the Third Council of the Lieutenant Governor of the Punjab
- In office 1913–1916

Wazir of Pratap singh
- In office 1917–1921
- Monarch: Pratap Singh of Jammu and Kashmir

Personal details
- Born: 7 December 1882 Kapurthala
- Died: 6 November 1946 (aged 63)
- Education: Aitchison College, Lahore
- Occupation: Scholar, Musician, Statesman
- Known for: Scholarly works on Sikhism, Musician, Theosophist, Prime Minister of Jammu and Kashmir

Raja Sir Daljit Singh (7 December 1882 – 6 November 1946) was a politician born in Kapurthala. He is considered as the first prime minister of Jammu and Kashmir (1917–1921) before Indian independence, while some consider Albion Rajkumar Banerjee as first prime minister.

== Early life and education ==
Singh was born in 1882 as the grandson of Maharaja Nihal Singh, who ruled the Sikh Kingdom of Kapurthala from 1836 to 1852. His father was Bikrama Singh. He received his education at Aitchison College in Lahore, where he had aristocratic classmates, including King Thibaw Min of Burma.

=== Scholarly contributions ===
Singh displayed a deep intellectual inclination, studying philosophy and scriptures. He authored several books in English, including works on Guru Nanak's life and teachings and Guru Tegh Bahadur's hymns. He also ventured into writing in "Braj bhasha" on Shri Krishna and published his work in notable publications like "Tri Dhara" and the Krishna Ank of the Gita Press Gorakhpur. Additionally, he translated the teachings of the Bhagwad Gita into his native Gurmukhi.

=== Musical prowess ===
Apart from his scholarly pursuits, Singh was a talented musician and a skilled rudra veena player. He was a disciple of Ustad Mir Kallan and his brother, Ustad Mir Rehmat Ali, who were direct descendants of the legendary musician Tansen. Despite being aristocrats, they lived with him and practiced music rigorously. He composed intricate musical compositions (gats) that continue to be played to this day. His home in Shimla was a hub for musicians and private concerts.

== Career ==
Although he preferred a private life, Singh was drawn into public service due to various circumstances. He served as a member of the Imperial Legislative Council, the Council of State, and the Third Council of the Lieutenant Governor of the Punjab during the early 20th century. He also held the position of Prime Minister of Jammu and Kashmir State for a brief period. His contributions extended to cultural endeavors as he played a pivotal role in fundraising for the construction of the Indian Memorial Gateway at the Royal Pavilion in Brighton, United Kingdom, securing donations from various Indian Maharajas.
