= Bikrama Singh's Estates Act =

Bikráma Singh's Estates Act 1883

Imperial Legislative Council
- Long title: An Act to confirm and give effect to an award made by His Excellency the Viceroy and Governor General regarding certain matters in dispute between Sardár Bikráma Singh and the Kapúrthhala State.
- Citation: Act No. X of 1883
- Assented to: 18 July 1883
- Repealed: 8 January 2018

Repealed by
- Repealing and Amending (Second) Act, 2017
- Status: Repealed

Bikrama Singh's Estates Act of 1883, was an unrepealed Act of the Government of India relating to the Awadh Estates of Kanwar Bikrama Singh of Kapurthala

ACT NO. X OF 1883 The Bikrama Singh's Estates Act came into existence after a dispute between Kaputhala State and Kanwarr Bikrama Singh. In effect, and to show commitment towards implementing this ruling in future cases, the estates act was confirmed and subsequently enacted after the ruling made by His Excellency the Viceroy who equally assumed the role of Governor General.

== Background ==
The Bikrama Singh's Estate Act was championed by Kanwar Sri Bikrama Singh Bahadur (1835-1887). He was a respected Sikh leader in the 19th century. His early life as a main progenitor of the Sikh Renaissance of the 19th century made him a highly favored and liked person. As a result, Kanwar Bikrama Singh was awarded an estate by the British Government. The estate was in form of a grant of land located in Awadh/ Oudh. The land was part of the Akauna Estate which had previously been settled and consented in the name of Raja of Kapurthala. After the British Government left India, the Raja of Kapurthala refused on the land thus denying Bikrama Singh of his reward. This led to a legal suit aimed at recovering possession of the land which formed part of the Akauna Estate.

== Ruling ==
Both Kanwar Bikrama Signh and His Highnes Raja Kurruck Singh agreed to refer the care to Sir Henry Davies who held the position of the Chief Commissioner of Oudh. Sir Henry Devies therefore assumed the role of an arbitrator. On January 6, 1871, Sir Henry Davies delivered the first award. The award read as follows: (Direct Quotation, India 1954)

"My award is that Raja Kurruck Singh of Kapurthala, his heirs executors or assigns, shall pay, within six months of the present date in trust to the Chief Commissioner and to the Financial Commissioner of Oudh for the time being, and to the Commissioner of the Faizabad Division for the time being, jointly, on behalf of Kanwar Bikrama Singh and the heirs male of his body (if any), the sum of five lakhs of rupees, to be invested, as early as practicable, by the aforementioned trustees in the purchase of land within the Province of Oudh. Such land, when purchased, shall be immediately delivered into the possession of Kanwar Bikrama Singh, and shall be held by him and by the heirs of his body, if any, in proprietary right. But in the event of Kanwar Bikrama Singh dying without heir’s male of his body, the proprietary right in all such land shall revert unconditionally to the Raja for the time being of Kapurthala.

"If the Raja of Kapurthala, his heirs, executors or assigns, fail to pay to the trustees the sum of five lakhs of rupees within six months from the present date, possession of the fifty-five hadbast circles detailed in the list hereto appended shall be given to Kanwar Bikrama Singh; and all these hadbast circles shall be held by him as mortgagee until the whole sum of five lakhs of rupees shall have been paid to the trustee.

Furthermore, the Raja of Kapurthala, his heirs, executors or assigns, shall pay to Kanwar Bikrama Singh, within one month from the present date, the sum of fifty thousand rupees in full liquidation of all claims to the means profits of past years. On the expiry of one month, such sum, if still unpaid, will bear interest at the rate of 12% per annum." Addendum to Award.

"To obviate doubts, I declare that, firstly, the words ‘heirs male’ means only the sons of a woman belonging to the ahl-i-biradiri of Kanwar Bikrama Singh; secondly, Kanwar Bikrama Singh shall, prior to the birth of an heir male of his body, have no power to mortgage or sell his interest in the estate purchased for him by the trustees without offering it in the first instance to the Raja of Kapurthala for the time being. This addendum shall be read as part of my award."

The first ward was challenged by the general public who questioned the actual meaning of the award. Given that the first award had elicited a dispute, the two parties consented to the submission of the case to His Excellency the Viceroy and Governor General of India. In accordance with the second submission, His Excellency the Viceroy and Governor General considered the matters raised in the first award. On 3 March 1881 he made a second award. The award went as follows:

"My award is that the estates already purchased and to be purchased shall (the aid of the Legislature being invoked if necessary) be so settled that they shall be the property of Bikrama Singh, subject to the following conditions and restrictions:- "First- No alienations of, or right (other than a right of tenancy subject to rent, or a right incidental to such a tenancy) created over, the estates or any part thereof by Bikrama Singha shall be valid for any period beyond his life. "Secondly – If Bikrama Singh at his death leaves a male heir of his body surviving him, the succession to the estates shall take place according to the proper law of inheritance; but the Estates shall not be chargeable with, or liable to be applied in satisfaction of, any debts incurred by Bikrama Singh, nor shall any person succeeding under this clause be liable, by reason of such succession, for any such debt.

"Thirdly – If Bikrama Singh at his death leaves no male heir of his body surviving him, the estates shall pass to the then Raja of Kapurthala. "Fourthly – If any lease or other contract fixing rent is granted to, or made with, a tenant by Bikrama Singh, for a term, and Bikrama Singh dies before the expiration of such term, or if any such lease or contract is so granted or made in perpetuity, the rent of such tenant shall, notwithstanding anything contained in such lease or contact, be subject on the death of Bikaram Singh to enhancement from time to time on the same grounds, subject to the same conditions and according to the same procedure as if such tenant were a tenant with a right of occupancy, but if the rent is enhanced under this clause, the tenant may at any time thereafter rescind such contract" (India 1954); Following these proceedings, the second ruling was made effective. In obedience to the first award, a sum specified in form of five lakhs of Rupee were then received by both the Commission of the Faizabad Division and the Financial Commissioner and Chief Commissioner of Oudh from Raja Kurruch Singh. The other settlements were made in accordance with the second award which was formalized and effected by the central government. This ruling came to form the bulk of the Bikrama Singh Estates Act of 1883.

== Bikrama Singh’s Estates Act ==
The first award had to be rescinded in order to make the second award superseding. This led to the enactment of the Bikrama Singh's Estates Act which in part read as following:-

Following this ruling, this act will henceforth be known as the Bikrama Singh's Estate Act (1883) and it shall come into force immediately. The first award has therefore been nullified and rescinded thus the trusts created herein, and in accordance with the second award shall be deemed executable, and the trustees shall be deemed as discharged.

The land estate and land specified in the case, which had been annexed shall be vested in Bikrama Signh and shall henceforth be deemed as settled by the said occupant as specific in the second award.

The Act was later on repealed after losing its significance in the modern India.

== See also ==
- Bikrama Singh
- The Kapurthala Royal Collateral Families
