= St John's Beaumont School =

Coordinates: 51.4444°N 0.5775°W

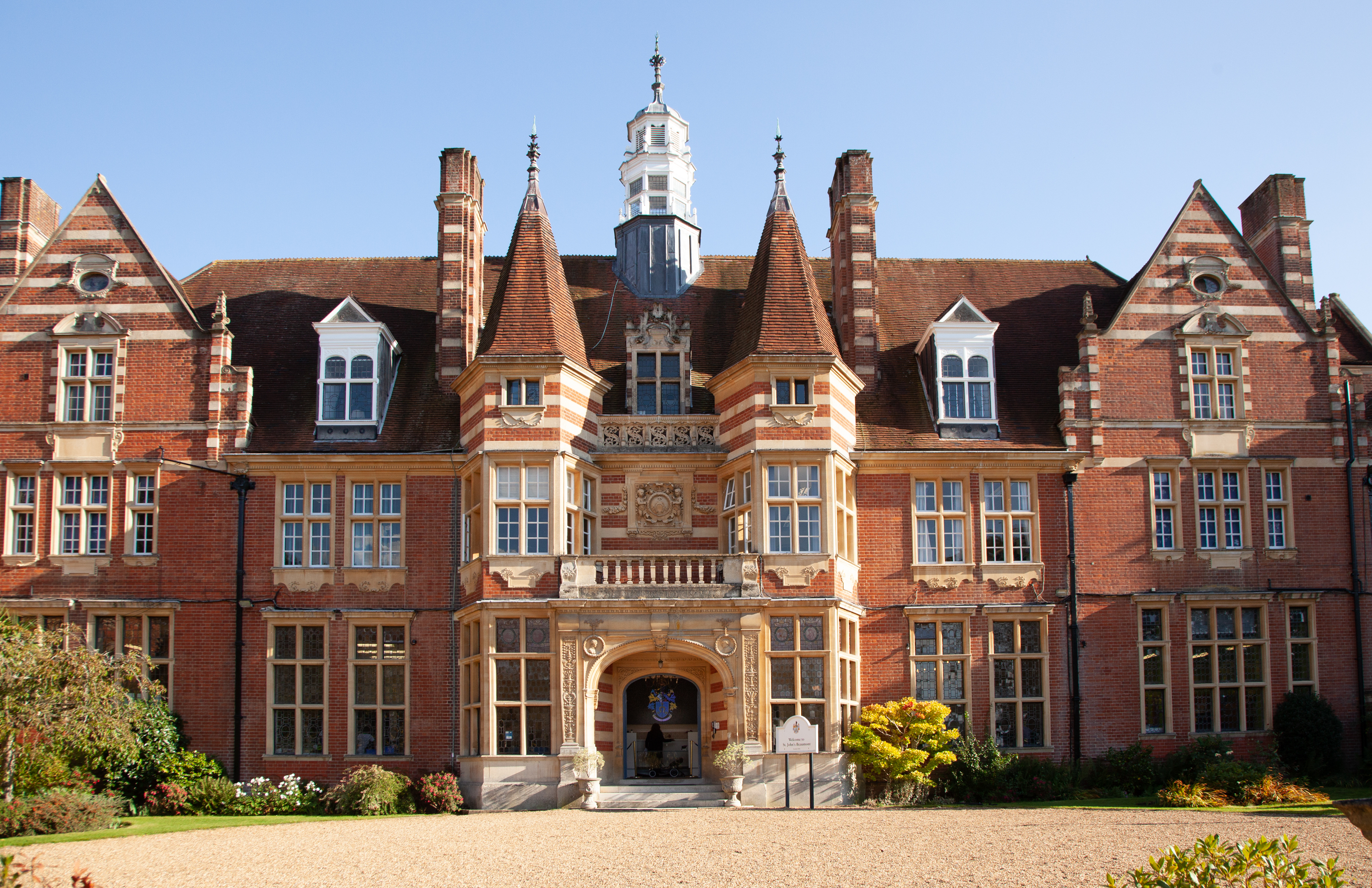
- School entrance

Location
- Priest Hill; Old Windsor, Berkshire, SL4 2JN; England

Information
- Type: Preparatory school Day & Boarding school
- Motto: Aeterna Non Caduca; Not for this life alone, but for eternity.
- Religious affiliation: Interfaith school, Catholic values
- Established: 1888
- Founder: Jesuits
- Local authority: Windsor and Maidenhead
- Head Master: Mr A De Silva
- Gender: Boys and girls
- Age: 3 to 13
- Enrolment: 200~
- Affiliation: IAPS
- Website: www.sjbwindsor.uk

St John’s Beaumont School is a private co‑educational day and boarding preparatory school for boys and girls aged 3 to 13, located on Priest's Hill, near Old Windsor on the Berkshire - Surrey border in England. Founded in 1888 by the Jesuits as the preparatory school for Beaumont College, it is widely regarded as the oldest purpose‑built preparatory school in the United Kingdom.

In 2025, the school was acquired by Intellego Education. St John's Beaumont School is part of the group's family of schools composed of Core International (Rome), Brighton College Madrid, Brighton College Rome and Brighton College Lisbon.

== History ==
St John's Beaumont was established in 1888 as a purpose-built preparatory school.

In 2009, Her Majesty Queen Elizabeth II opened the school's new purpose-built sport centre.

In 2023, the school transitioned to a fully co-educational model, welcoming girls into its Pre‑Prep and middle school years under the leadership of Headmaster Philip Barr.

In 2025, operational responsibility for St John's Beaumont was transferred from the Jesuits to Intellego Education.

== Facilities ==
The school campus occupies approximately 50 acres of woodland and playing fields on the edge of Windsor Great Park.

Facilities include specialist classrooms, a 25‑metre indoor swimming pool, floodlit all‑weather courts, an indoor sports hall with an 8‑metre climbing wall, dedicated art and music studios, science laboratories, library and ICT suites, and theatre space. Recent developments support the expansion of the pupil body and the transition to co‑education, including enhanced spaces for performing arts and sports.

== Notable alumni ==
- Zafar Ansari, Surrey and England cricketer
- William F. Buckley Jr., conservative writer and political commentator
- Andrew Maxwell Morris, singer, songwriter and composer
- Amar Singh (born 1989), art and non-fungible token (NFT) dealer, philanthropist, women's rights and LGBTQ+ activist, and film producer

== List of headmasters ==
- Fr J. Lynch SJ (1888–1894)
- Fr M. Cullen SJ (1894–1897)
- Fr J. Lynch SJ (1897–1902)
- Fr J. O'Gorman SJ (1902–1904)
- Fr T. Ellison SJ (1904–1907)
- Fr R. Dalrymple SJ (1907–1908)
- Fr F.W.Green SJ (1908–1917)
- Fr J. Manning SJ (1917–1918)
- Fr G. Sexton SJ (1918–1929)
- Fr J. Hill SJ (1929–1936)
- Fr J. Sharkey (1936–1946)
- Fr E. Basset SJ (1946–1949)
- Fr T. Dunphy SJ (1949–1964)
- Fr K. McHugh SJ (1964–1970)
- Fr. Ignatius St Lawrence SJ (1970–1974)
- Fr. Cifford Taunton SJ (1974–1978)
- Fr. Bernard Walker SJ (1978–1984)
- Mr B. Duffy (1984–1987)
- Mr D. Gogarty (1987–2005)
- Mr G. Delaney (2006–2022)
- Dr D. Smith (2022–2023)
- Mr P. Barr (2023–2026)
- Mr A. De Silva (2026—Present)
