= Billy Arjan Singh =

Indian hunter and conservationist

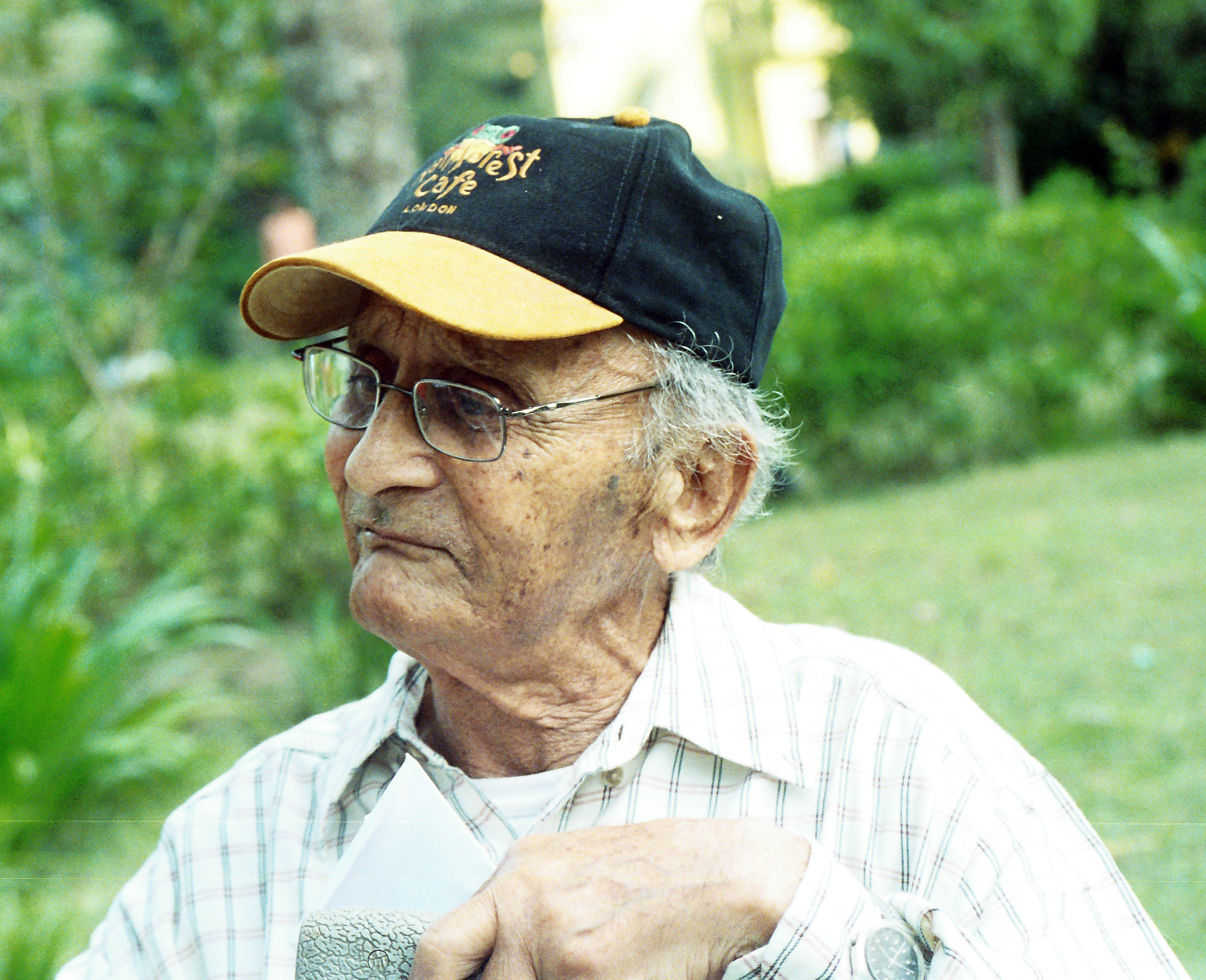
Billy Arjan Singh

Kunwar "Billy" Arjan Singh (15 August 1917 – 1 January 2010) was an Indian hunter turned conservationist and author. He was the first who tried to reintroduce tigers and leopards from captivity into the wild.

Billy Arjan Singh died at his original farmhouse Jasbir Nagar on 1 January 2010.

== Early life ==
Billy Arjan Singh was born in Gorakhpur on 15 August 1917 as the second son of Kunwar Jasbir Singh and grandson of Harnam Singh. His elder brother was Air Vice-Marshal Kunwar Jaswant Singh.

== Hunter turned conservationist ==
Singh described how in his youth he had been an insatiable hunter. However, one day having shot a young leopard in the lights of his vehicle, he dramatically changed his view of hunting, feeling nothing but revulsion for killing and vowing that from then on he would pursue the cause of conservation. His first major project was to save a herd of barasingha in the neighbouring Sathiana range of the forestry reserve at Dudhwa. In 1976, he was awarded the World Wildlife Fund's gold medal, the WWF's premier award, for his conservation work. He was also largely responsible for persuading the then Prime Minister, Indira Gandhi, to transform Dudhwa into a 200-square-mile (520 km^{2}) national park.

== Re-introduction of big cats ==
Singh's conservation efforts for wildlife are best known for his reintroduction of leopards and a tiger into the wild of Dudhwa National Park. He started by bringing up an orphaned male leopard cub named Prince, which he successfully reintroduced to the wild in 1973. To provide Prince with a mate he subsequently raised two orphaned female leopards cubs, Harriet and Juliette. In July 1976, he acquired a hand-reared female tiger cub named Tara from Twycross Zoo in the United Kingdom, and reintroduced her to the wild in the Dudhwa National Park with the permission of India's then Prime Minister Indira Gandhi.

In the 1990s, some tigers were observed in the protected area, which had a Siberian tiger phenotype of a large head, pale pelage, white complexion, and wide stripes, and were therefore suspected to be Bengal-Siberian tiger hybrids. Billy Arjan Singh sent hair samples of tigers from the area to the Centre for Cellular and Molecular Biology in Hyderabad where the samples were analysed using mitochondrial sequence analysis. Results revealed that the tigers in question had a Bengal tiger mitochondrial haplotype indicating that their mother was a Bengal tiger. Skin, hair and blood samples from 71 tigers collected in various Indian zoos, in the National Museum in Kolkata and including the two hair samples from Dudhwa National Park were prepared for microsatellite analysis that revealed that two tigers had alleles in two loci that were contributed by Bengal and Siberian tiger subspecies. However, samples of two hybrid specimens constituted a too small base to conclusively presume that Tara was the source of the Siberian tiger genes.

== Awards ==
For his contributions to conservation, Arjan Singh was widely honoured. In 1996, he was awarded the World Wildlife Gold Medal, and obtained the Order of the Golden Ark in 1997.

In 2004, Arjan Singh received the Getty Award, administered by the World Wildlife Fund, for his innovative contribution to conservation and for creating public awareness. In 2006, he received the Yash Bharati award and the Padma Bhushan two months later.

He also received the Lifetime Award for Tiger Conservation.

== Legacy ==
To ensure that his work in conservation continued, Singh established the Tiger Haven Society in 1992. The Society's aims include preserving Tiger Haven and sponsoring research into wildlife.

== Publications ==
- Tiger Haven. Macmillan, London 1973; Oxford University Press, Oxford 1999
- Tara, a tigress. Quartet Books, London and New York 1981
- Prince of cats. Jonathan Cape, London 1982; Oxford University Press, New Delhi 2000
- Tiger! Tiger!. Jonathan Cape, London 1984 and 1986
- The legend of the maneater. Orient Longman, New Delhi 1993
- Arjan Singh's tiger book. (co-author) Lotus Collection, Roli Books, New Delhi 1998
- A tiger's story. HarperCollins Publishers India, New Delhi 1999; Tara-India Research Press, New Delhi 2005
- Eelie and the big cats. Oxford University Press, New Delhi and New York 2001
- Watching India's wildlife : the anthology of a lifetime. Oxford University Press, New Delhi 2003 and 2004

=== Biographies ===
- Hart-Davies, D. 2005. Honorary tiger : the life of Billy Arjan Singh. Lotus Collection, Roli Books, New Delhi
- Shaminder Boparai, and A. Mookerjee (ed.) 2011. Billy Arjan Singh – Tiger of Dudhwa with support from WWF, Tiger Haven Society. HarperCollins, New Delhi
