= Mustvee =

Town in Estonia

- Town
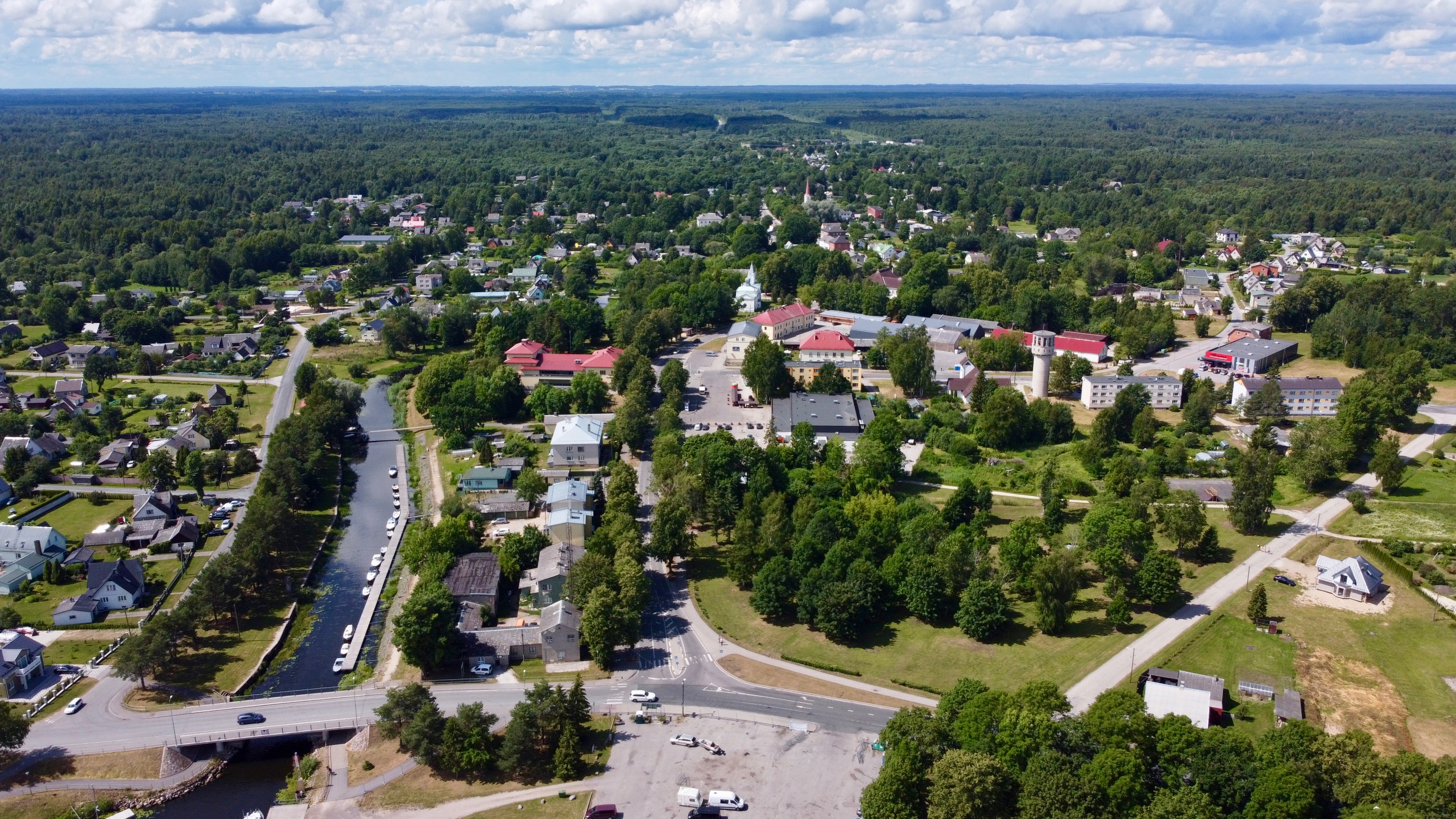
- Aerial view of Mustvee

- Location in Estonia
- Coordinates: 58°50′56″N 26°56′37″E
- Country: Estonia
- County: Jõgeva County
- Municipality: Mustvee Parish

Area
  - Total: 5.45 km^{2} (2.10 sq mi)

Population (2026)
  - Total: 1,101
  - Rank: 42nd
  - Density: 202/km^{2} (523/sq mi)
- Time zone: UTC+2 (EET)
  - Summer (DST): UTC+3 (EEST)

Mustvee is a town in Estonia. It lies on the west coast of Lake Peipus, and is administratively part of the Mustvee Parish in Jõgeva County. Ethnic Estonians and Russians both make up around half of its population of about 1,100 as of 2026.

== Name ==
Mustvee was attested in historical sources as Mustut in 1493; as folwark Mostfersth alias Czarny, Mosthffer, and wioska Musth alias Czarne in 1599; and as Mustvett in 1601, among other variations. The name literally means 'black water', from must 'black' + vee (genitive of vesi 'water'). It is believed that *Mustvesi 'black water' was probably a parallel name for Lake Peipus. Another possibility is that 'black water' referred to a river rather than the lake. In Estonian toponyms, the final element vesi 'water' is infrequent, but it is found in the names of some Finnish lakes, such as Enonvesi and Toisvesi.

== History ==
The beginning of continuous ethnic Russian settlement in what is now Estonia dates back to the late 17th century when several thousand Eastern Orthodox Old Believers, escaping religious persecution in Russia (after the Tsardom of Muscovy had declared them outlaws in 1658) settled in Mustvee and other safe haven areas then ruled by Kingdom of Sweden on the west coast of Lake Peipus.

Mustvee has held fairs for the past two centuries. Due to its position at the broadest part of the lake, this traditional fishing town is increasingly popular as a tourist centre. The new Harbour of Mustvee was opened on 18 December 2014.

== Demographics ==
Drone video of Lake Peipus and the town of Mustvee in July 2022

Ethnic composition 1922-2021
Ethnicity	1922		1934		1941		1959		1970		1979		1989		2000		2011		2021	
Ethnicity	amount	%	amount	%	amount	%	amount	%	amount	%	amount	%	amount	%	amount	%	amount	%	amount	%
Estonians	803	29.3	1006	35.4	670	35.4	1012	43.5	968	43.5	921	44.1	862	43.2	714	40.7	563	41.5	504	43.5
Russians	1937	70.6	1784	62.8	1197	63.2	-	-	1207	54.2	1123	53.8	1082	54.3	1000	57.0	-	-	617	53.2
Ukrainians	-	-	0	0.00	-	-	-	-	14	0.63	11	0.53	18	0.90	-	-	-	-	8	0.69
Belarusians	-	-	-	-	-	-	-	-	12	0.54	7	0.34	12	0.60	-	-	-	-	6	0.52
Finns	-	-	2	0.07	1	0.05	-	-	10	0.45	10	0.48	8	0.40	-	-	-	-	5	0.43
Jews	0	0.00	6	0.21	0	0.00	-	-	0	0.00	0	0.00	0	0.00	-	-	-	-	0	0.00
Latvians	-	-	0	0.00	0	0.00	-	-	1	0.04	2	0.10	2	0.10	-	-	-	-	0	0.00
Germans	1	0.04	20	0.70	-	-	-	-	-	-	8	0.38	4	0.20	-	-	-	-	3	0.26
Tatars	-	-	0	0.00	-	-	-	-	-	-	0	0.00	1	0.05	-	-	-	-	0	0.00
Poles	-	-	6	0.21	6	0.32	-	-	-	-	1	0.05	0	0.00	-	-	-	-	0	0.00
Lithuanians	-	-	1	0.04	1	0.05	-	-	2	0.09	0	0.00	0	0.00	-	-	-	-	0	0.00
unknown	0	0.00	2	0.07	5	0.26	0	0.00	0	0.00	0	0.00	0	0.00	0	0.00	1	0.00	0	0.00
other	4	0.15	14	0.49	13	0.69	1313	56.5	13	0.58	4	0.19	5	0.25	39	2.22	794	58.5	14	1.21
Total	2745	100	2841	100	1893	100	2325	100	2227	100	2087	100	1994	100	1753	100	1358	100	1159	99.8

== Climate ==
Climate data for Mustvee (located at Tiirikoja meteorological station) normals 1991–2020, extremes 1922–present
Month	Jan	Feb	Mar	Apr	May	Jun	Jul	Aug	Sep	Oct	Nov	Dec	Year
Record high °C (°F)	9.7 (49.5)	11.9 (53.4)	16.7 (62.1)	26.9 (80.4)	30.0 (86.0)	30.7 (87.3)	33.8 (92.8)	30.9 (87.6)	27.3 (81.1)	20.4 (68.7)	13.6 (56.5)	11.4 (52.5)	33.8 (92.8)
Mean daily maximum °C (°F)	−1.7 (28.9)	−1.8 (28.8)	2.6 (36.7)	9.3 (48.7)	16.1 (61.0)	20.2 (68.4)	22.8 (73.0)	21.4 (70.5)	16.2 (61.2)	9.3 (48.7)	3.4 (38.1)	0.1 (32.2)	9.8 (49.6)
Daily mean °C (°F)	−4.2 (24.4)	−5.0 (23.0)	−1.5 (29.3)	4.1 (39.4)	10.3 (50.5)	14.9 (58.8)	17.6 (63.7)	16.2 (61.2)	11.6 (52.9)	5.9 (42.6)	1.2 (34.2)	−2.0 (28.4)	5.8 (42.4)
Mean daily minimum °C (°F)	−7.1 (19.2)	−8.4 (16.9)	−5.2 (22.6)	−0.1 (31.8)	4.7 (40.5)	9.5 (49.1)	12.3 (54.1)	11.3 (52.3)	7.4 (45.3)	2.8 (37.0)	−1.1 (30.0)	−4.4 (24.1)	1.8 (35.2)
Record low °C (°F)	−37.7 (−35.9)	−38.1 (−36.6)	−31.9 (−25.4)	−23 (−9)	−7.1 (19.2)	−2.8 (27.0)	1.0 (33.8)	−0.5 (31.1)	−4.9 (23.2)	−14 (7)	−24.4 (−11.9)	−39.6 (−39.3)	−39.6 (−39.3)
Average precipitation mm (inches)	43 (1.7)	37 (1.5)	32 (1.3)	33 (1.3)	48 (1.9)	78 (3.1)	68 (2.7)	78 (3.1)	52 (2.0)	62 (2.4)	54 (2.1)	48 (1.9)	633 (24.9)
Average precipitation days (≥ 1.0 mm)	12.1	9.9	8.5	7.4	8.2	10.7	9.6	10.7	9.5	11.3	11.4	12.3	121.6
Average relative humidity (%)	89	87	81	75	72	75	79	82	84	87	90	90	82
Mean monthly sunshine hours	32.8	62.7	139.6	191.3	266.3	253.0	276.0	232.6	152.0	78.7	30.3	21.1	1,735.4
Source: Estonian Weather Service

== Mayors of Mustvee ==
*	Office	Name	Notes
1	1938–1939	Valter Kulli	Mayor, first mayor of Mustvee
2	1939–1940	Mihkel Koppel	Mayor
3	1940–1941	Nikifor Semjonov	Chairman of Executive Committee
4	1941	Nazar Lizarov	Chairman of Executive Committee
5	1941–1944	Mihkel Ots	Mayor
6	1944–1945	Sergei Kaimov	Chairman of Executive Committee
7	1945–1947	Nikolai Kussov	Chairman of Executive Committee
8	1947–1948	Vassili Tchernyshev	Chairman of Executive Committee
27	1948–1950	Hariton Bezzubov	Chairman of Executive Committee
28	1950–1952	Tihon Klimov	Chairman of Executive Committee
29	1952–1957	Luka Uleksin	Chairman of Executive Committee
30	1957–1959	Ivan Storosko	Chairman of Executive Committee
31	1959–1982	Elmar Peterson	Chairman of Executive Committee
31	1982–1984	Vello Mäesepp	Chairman of Executive Committee
31	1984–1996	Andres Rebane	Chairman of Executive Committee; Mayor
34	1996–1997	Aare Uleksin	Mayor
34	1997–2002	Pavel Kostromin	Mayor
35	2002–2007	Gennadi Kulkov	Mayor
36	2007–2009	Mati Kepp	Mayor
37	2009	Lembit Kivimurd	Mayor
38	2009–2010	Mati Kepp	Mayor
39	2010–2011	Urmas Laur	Mayor
40	2012–2013	Pavel Kostromin	Mayor
43	2013–2017	Max Kaur	Mayor, last mayor of Mustvee

== Gallery ==
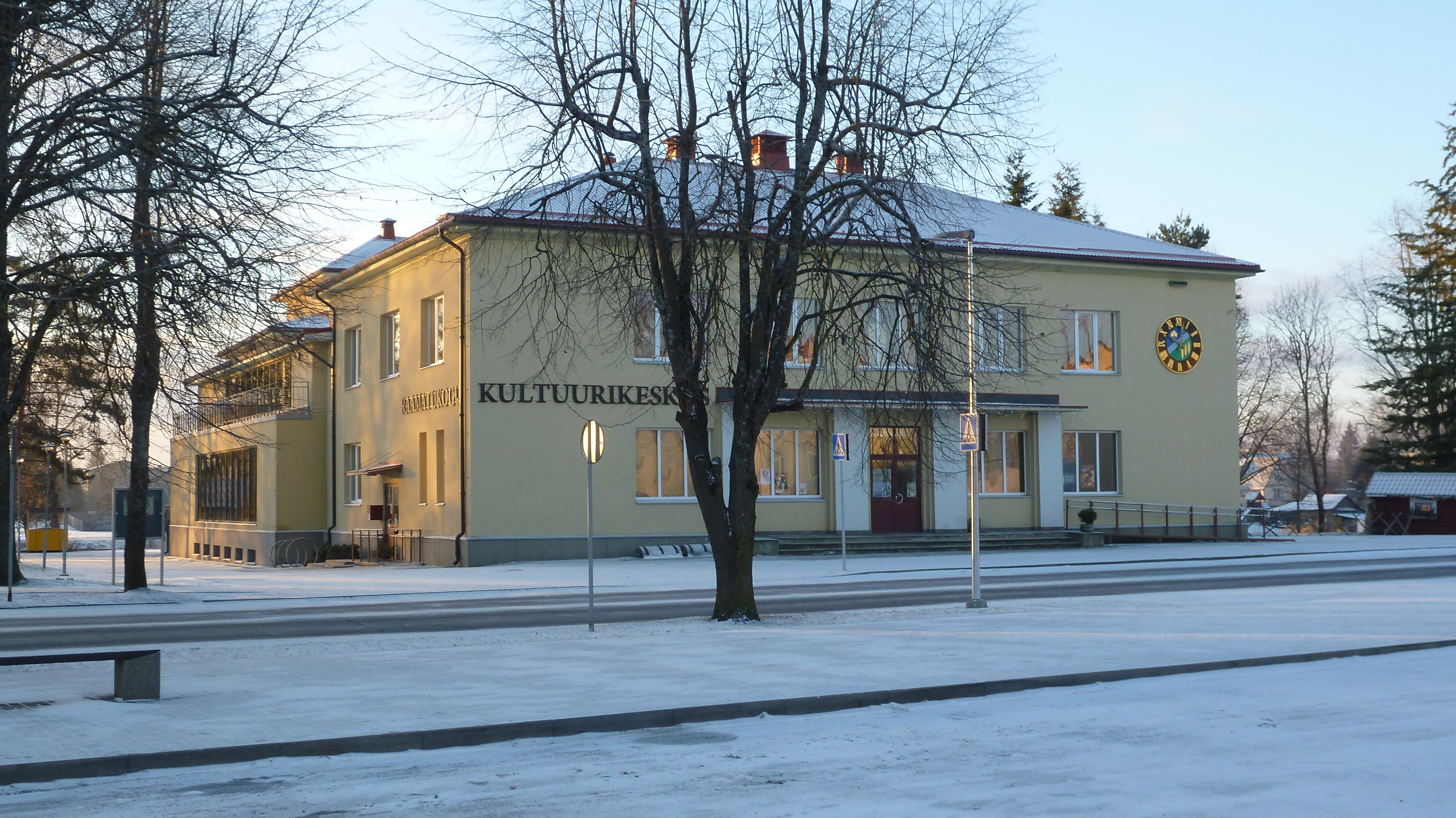
Mustvee house of culture

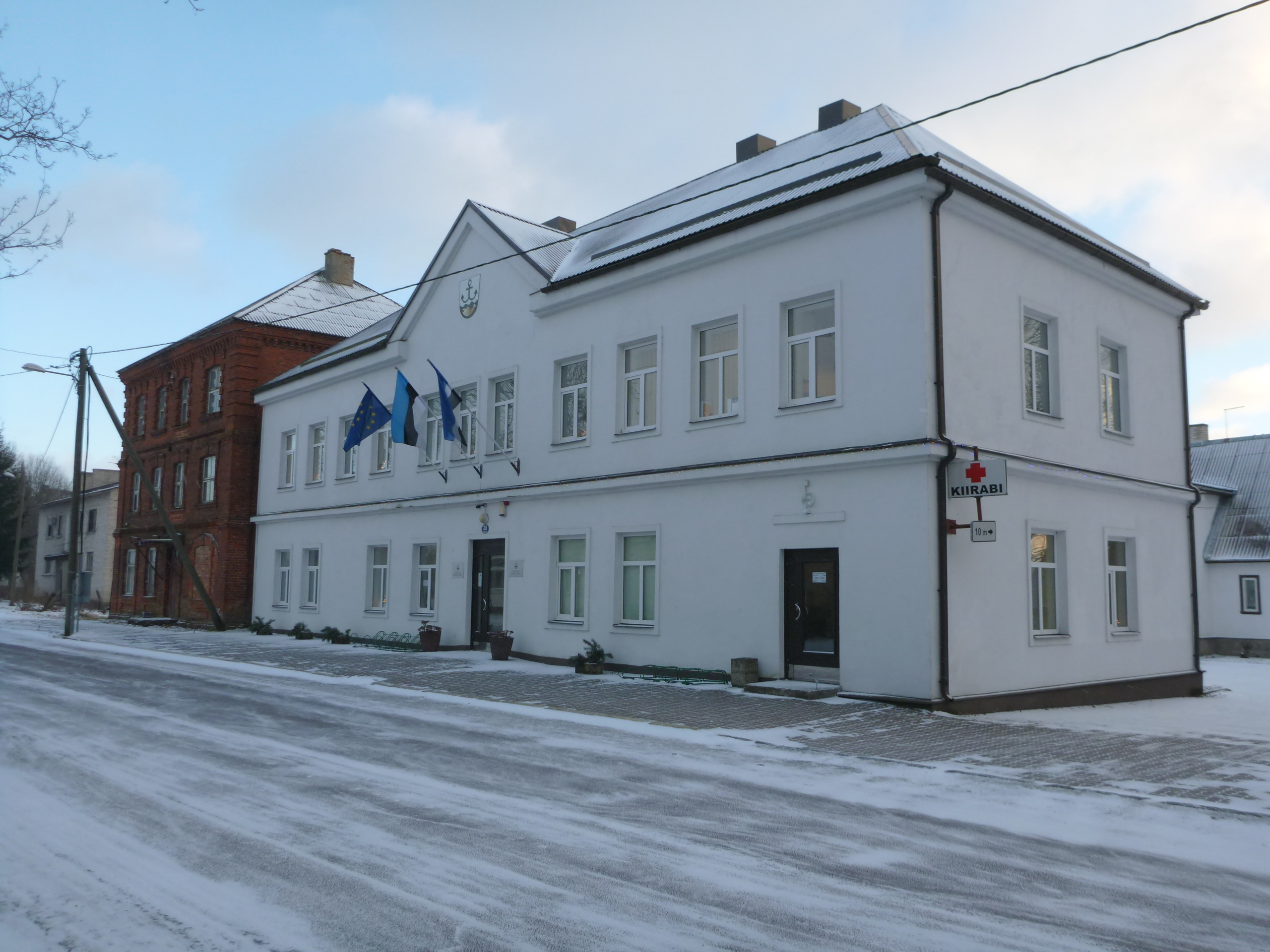
Mustvee town hall

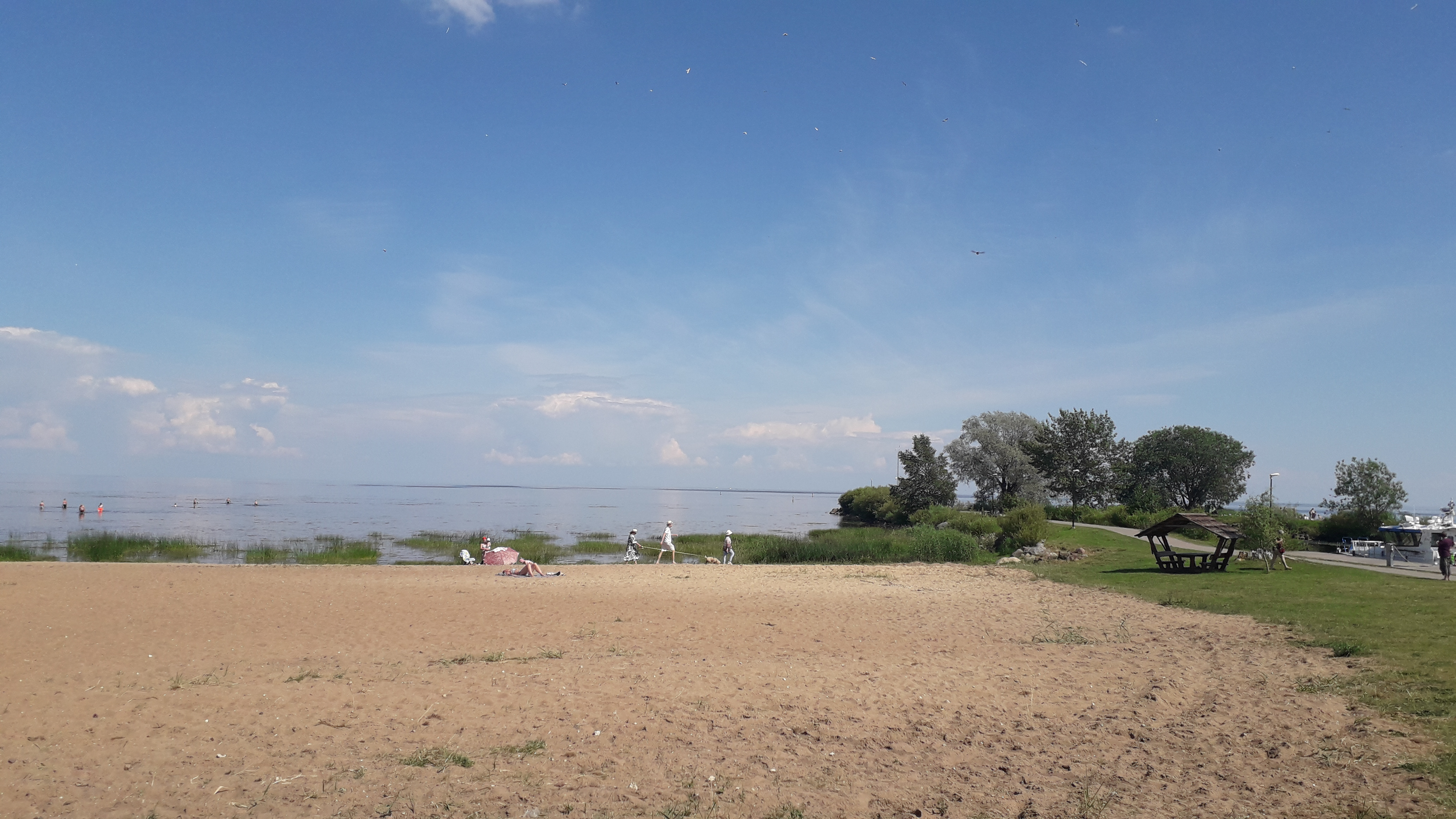
Mustvee, beach at Lake Peipus

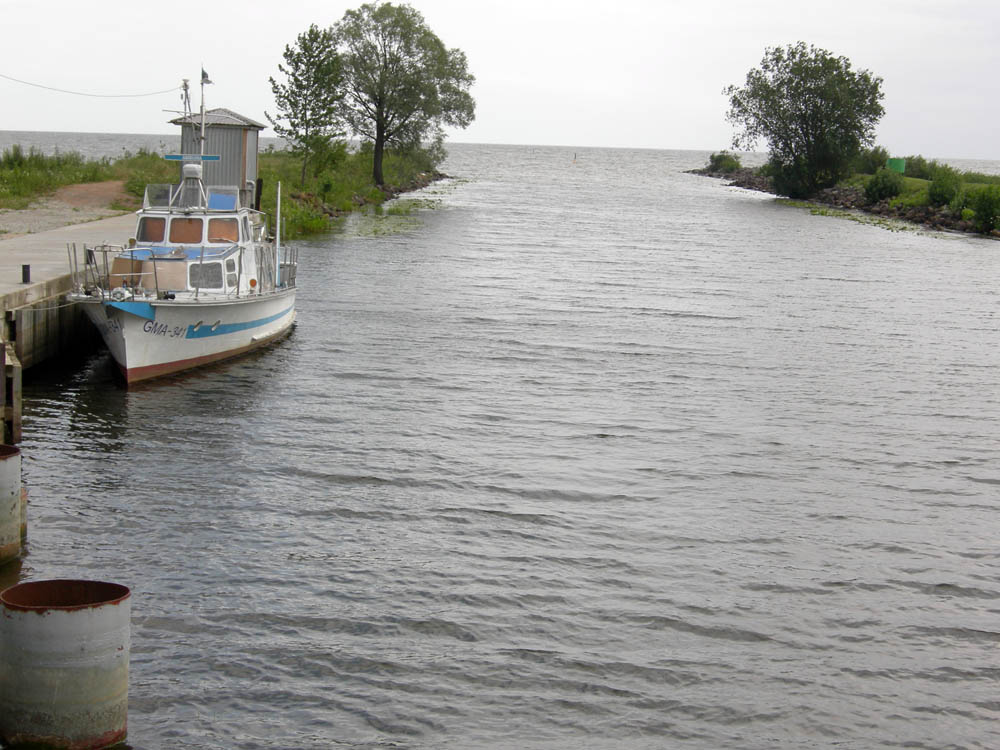
Harbor at Mustvee, on the coast of Lake Peipus

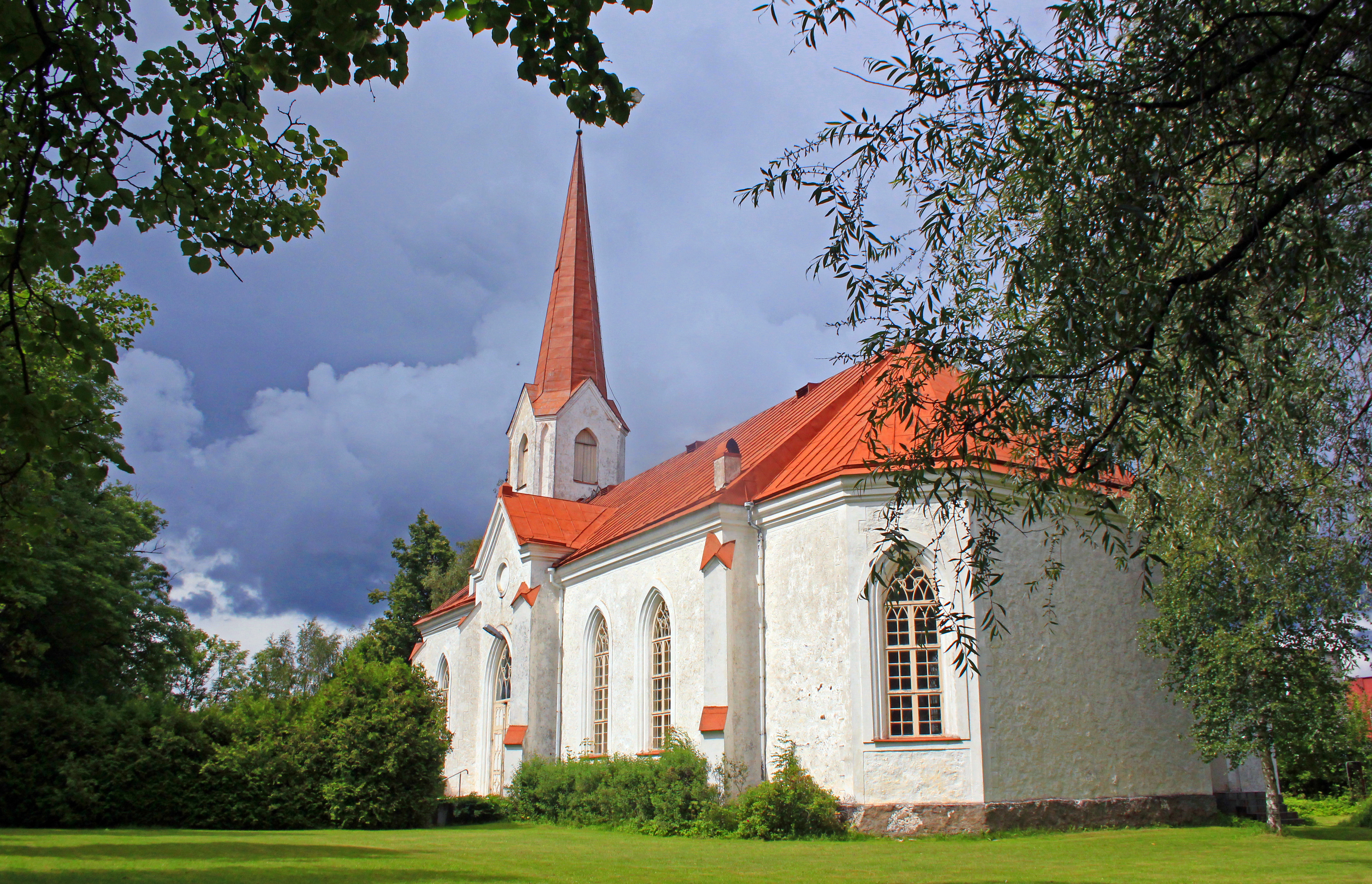
Mustvee church

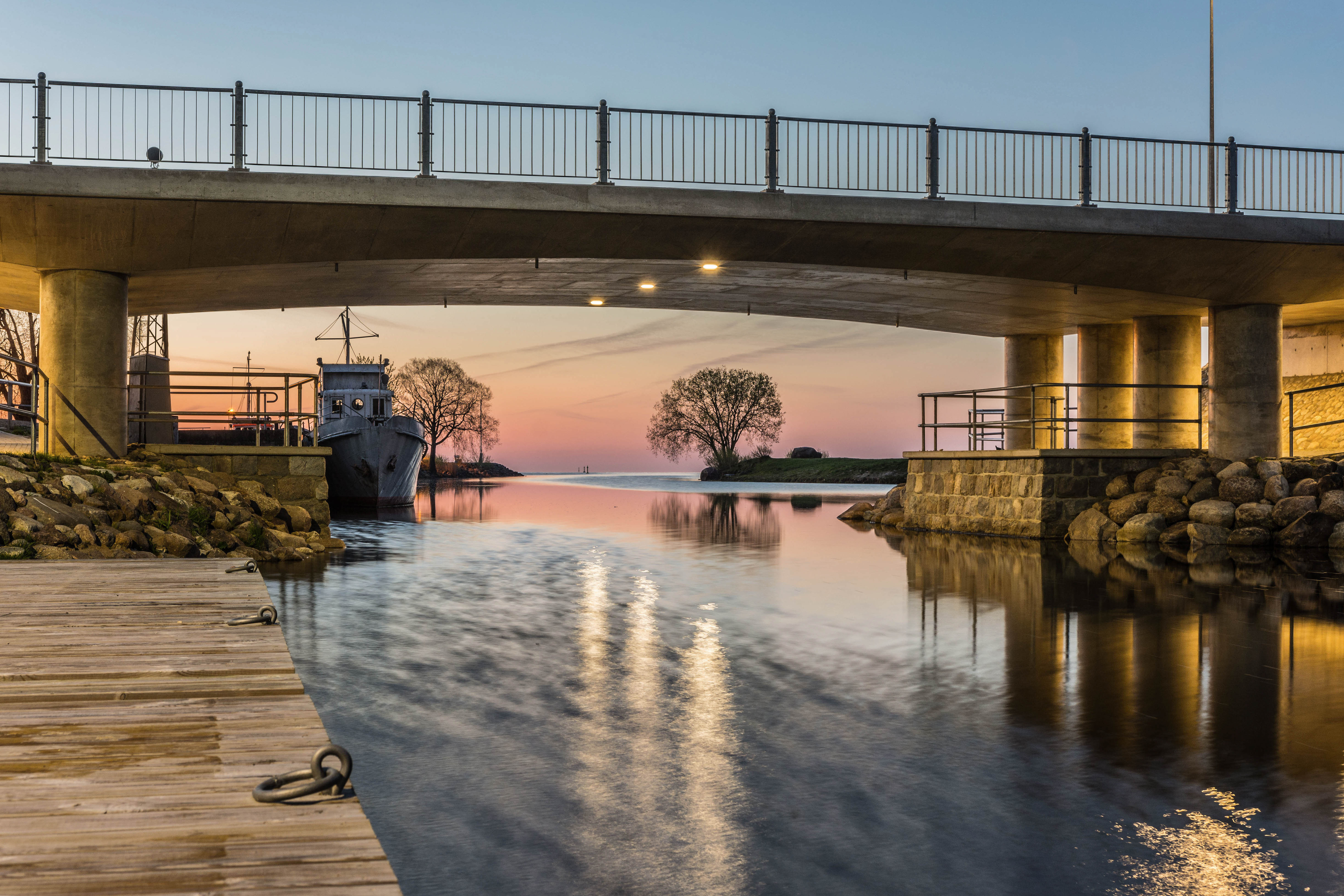
Bridge over port on the shore of Lake Peipus

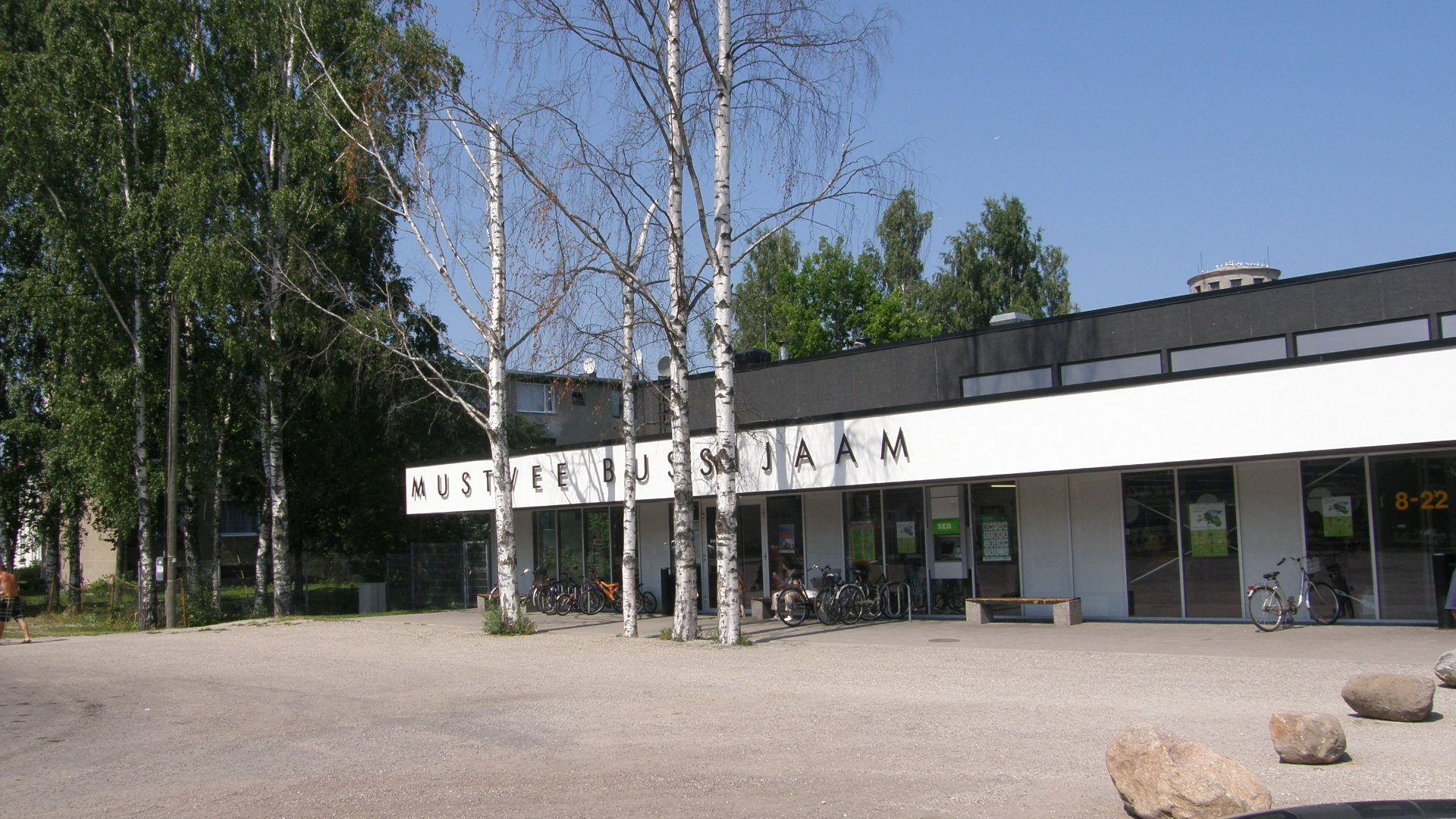
Mustvee bus station

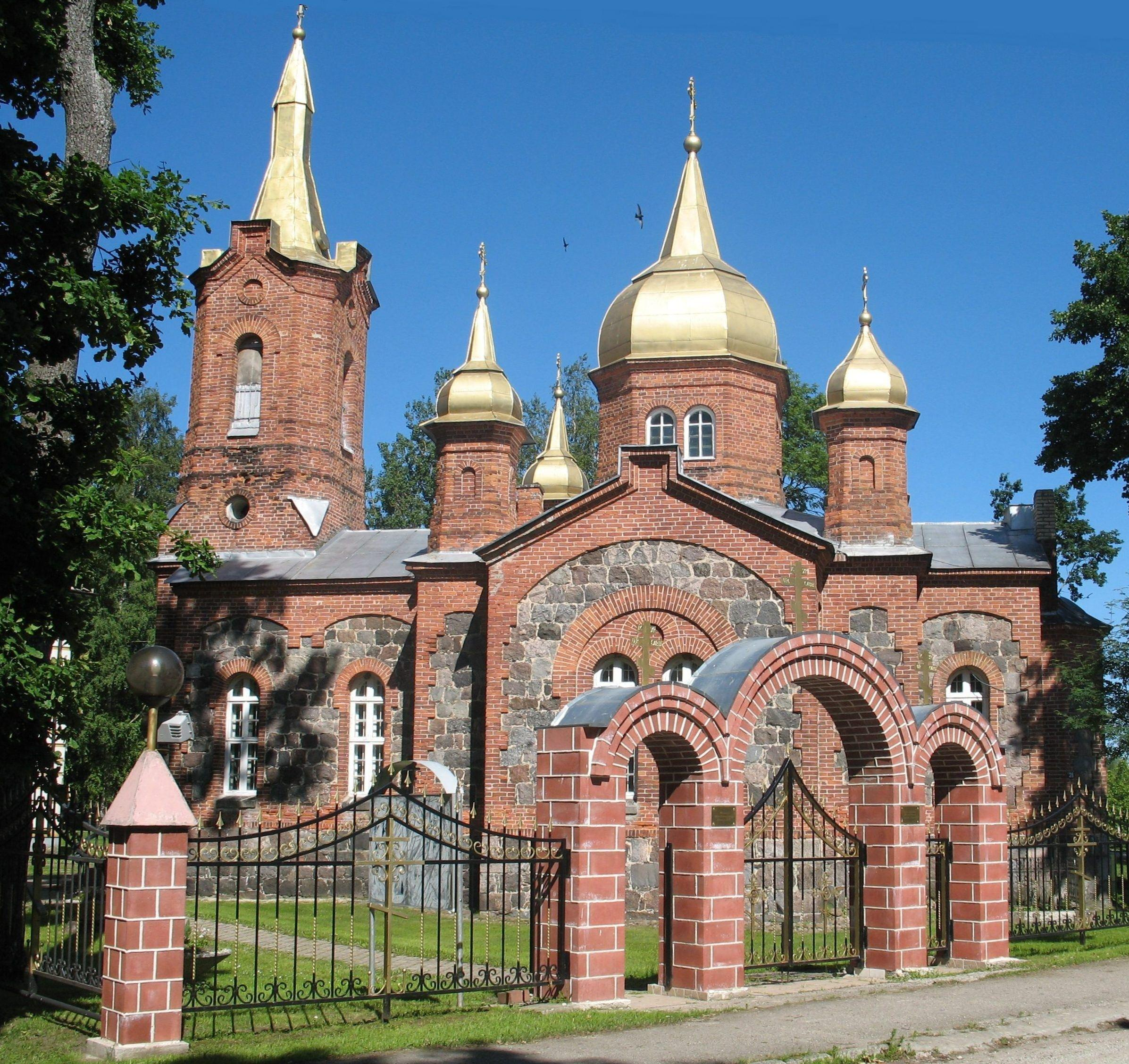
Holy Trinity Unitarian Church in Mustvee
