= Judith Kaur =

American oncologist

Judith Salmon Kaur
- Born: 1945 (age 80–81)
- Education: University of North Dakota; University of Colorado Boulder
- Scientific career
- Workplaces: Mayo Clinic

Judith Salmon Kaur (born 1945) is a Native American oncologist who is Director of the Native American Programs in the Mayo Clinic Cancer Center. According to Indian Country Today, Kaur is one of only two Native American oncologists working in the United States.

== Early life and education ==
Kaur is a citizen of the Choctaw Nation of Oklahoma, and is also of Cherokee heritage. At the age of five, her Choctaw Nation grandmother told her that she was "meant to be a healer,". She was the first member of her family to graduate from high school, and, after graduating from Augustana College, started her professional career as a teacher. Whilst working as a teacher, Kaur had a daughter and got married. Her husband would come home to see her spending her evenings reading Scientific American. Her husband eventually challenged her to apply to medical school, and in 1975 she was accepted to the University of North Dakota Indian Health Service's Indians into Medicine Program (INMED) programme, which supports Native Americans and Alaska Natives in pursuing careers in healthcare. She originally intended to earn her medical degree and move back to the reservation to work in family medicine. In her third year of medical school, Kaur decided to specialise as an oncologist. She eventually completed her medical degree at the University of Colorado School of Medicine.

== Research and career ==
Kaur is committed to ending health inequities for indigenous communities, looking to transform the medical outcomes of people suffering from cancer. She has focused on increasing participation in clinical trials and supporting indigenous students in pursuing careers in medicine. As one of the first National Cancer Institute (NCI) investigators to collect data on cancer prevalence and perceptions amongst indigenous communities, she has raised awareness of cancer amongst tribes in the Midwest United States. Before the work of Kaur, there was a misconception that cancer was a 'white people's disease'.

In particular, Kaur specialises on women's cancers, with a focus on breast and cervical cancer. She has studied the biomarkers of breast cancer in Alaska Natives and Native Americans. She also worked with Alaska Native pregnant women on smoking cessation and exposure to carcinogens. Since founding the resource centre in 1999, Kaur has served as medical director of the American Indian/Alaska Native Cancer Information Resource Center and Learning Exchange (Native CIRCLE). Alongside Native CIRCLE, Kaur leads the American Indian / Alaska Native Initiative on Cancer, Spirit of EAGLES. The programme looks to provide culturally relevant education and research. In particular, Kaur works to improve the access of indigenous communities to the Affordable Care Act.

In 2007 Kaur published the Annual Report to the Nation on the Status of Cancer, which identified that despite the progress the United States had made in reducing the prevalence of cancer, this was not reflected in indigenous populations. Kaur was named the 2017 Richard Swanson Humanitarian Award winner by her alma mater Augustana College. In 2018 she was awarded the Mayo Clinic Distinguished Alumni Award for her work with Native American communities.

== Select publications ==
- Espey, David K.; Wu, Xiao-Cheng; Swan, Judith; Wiggins, Charles; Jim, Melissa A.; Ward, Elizabeth; Wingo, Phyllis A.; Howe, Holly L.; Ries, Lynn A. G.; Miller, Barry A.; Jemal, Ahmedin (2007-11-15). "Annual report to the nation on the status of cancer, 1975–2004, featuring cancer in American Indians and Alaska Natives". Cancer. 110 (10): 2119–2152. doi:10.1002/cncr.23044. PMID 17939129. S2CID 25675721.
- Choong, Nicholas W. W.; Quevedo, J. Fernando; Kaur, Judith S. (2005-03-15). "Small cell carcinoma of the urinary bladder: The Mayo Clinic experience". Cancer. 103 (6): 1172–1178. doi:10.1002/cncr.20903. ISSN 0008-543X. PMID 15700264. S2CID 45059794.
- Burch, Patrick A.; Breen, Jami K.; Buckner, Jan C.; Gastineau, Dennis A.; Kaur, Judith A.; Laus, Reiner L.; Padley, Douglas J.; Peshwa, Madhusudan V.; Pitot, Henry C.; Richardson, Ronald L.; Smits, Bouwien J. (2000-06-01). "Priming Tissue-specific Cellular Immunity in a Phase I Trial of Autologous Dendritic Cells for Prostate Cancer". Clinical Cancer Research. 6 (6): 2175–2182. ISSN 1078-0432. PMID 10873066.
