= Larissa Kaur =

Estonian dancer

- Born: Larissa Lazareva; October 31, 1941 (age 84); Baku, Azerbaijan
- Education: Tallinn Choreography School
- Occupation: Dancer
- Years active: 1961–1979
- Children: Max Kaur (son)

Larissa Kaur (née Lazareva; born 31 October 1941) is an Estonian dancer.

Kaur was born in Baku, Azerbaijan of mixed Greek and Ukrainian heritage. She graduated from the Tallinn Choreography School (Jelena Izerovič's class) in 1959, then trained with Natalia Dudinskaya in 1960 at the Mariinsky Ballet.

Between 1961 and 1979, she danced as a prima ballerina at the Estonian SSR National Academic Opera and Ballet Theatre. She has also appeared in Viru and Astoria variety shows and was a print model for the largest and most popular fashion magazines in Estonia and Eastern Europe. Kaur posed many times as the cover girl of her local fashion magazine Siluett.

In 1965 Kaur became a member of the Estonian Theater Association.

Kaur's father was in the military, while her son is politician and local government figure Max Kaur.

== Parts ==
- Actress (Erich Wolfgang Korngold's Straussiana, 1961)
- The Yacht Owner's Girlfriend (Romualds Grīnblats' Rigonda, 1961)
- Odette/Ottilie (Tchaikovsky's Swan Lake, 1961)
- Myrtha (Adolphe Adam's Giselle, 1961)
- Mulatitar (Gara Garayev's The Path of Thunder, 1962)
- Mari (Lydia Auster's Tiina, 1966)
- Princess (Samuel Barber's Medea, 1966)
- The street dancer, Mercedes and the messenger of the Dryads (Ludwig Minkus' Don Quixote, 1968)
- Amm (Sergei Prokofiev's Romeo and Juliet, 1971)

== Literature ==
- P. Lugovskoy. The youngest Odette: [Swan Lake]. - Soviet Culture, December 16, 1961 (П. Луговской. Самая юная Одетта: [Лебединое озеро]. – Советская Культура, 16 декабря 1961)
- In the morning - "Swan Lake", in the evening - a variety show. – Youth of Estonia, April 28, 2007 (Утром – „Лебединое озеро”, вечером – варьете. – Молодежь Эстонии, 28 апреля 2007)
