= Vishvjit Singh =

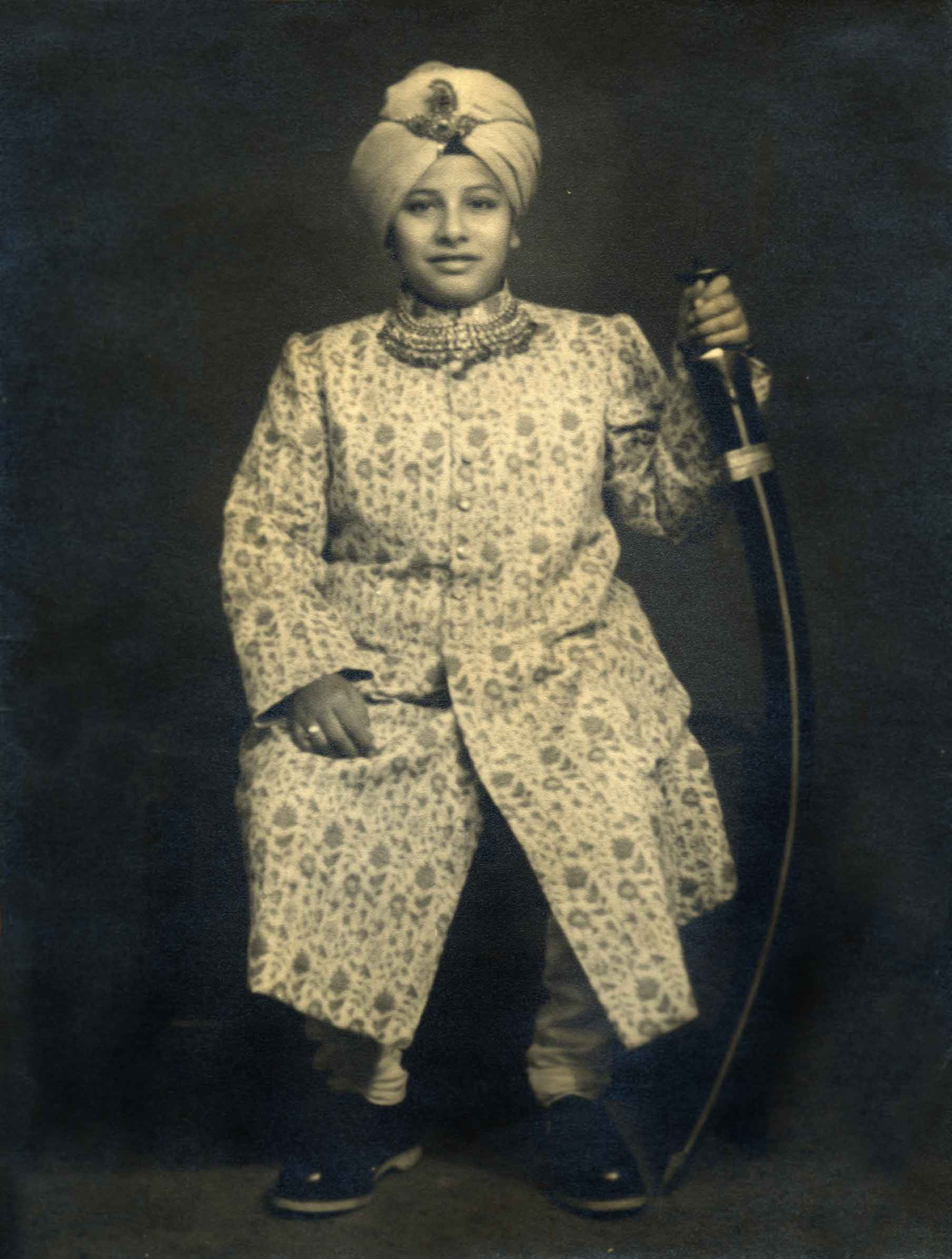

Vishvjit Prithvijit Singh (29 October 1946 - 6 August 2017) was an Indian politician with the Indian National Congress party. He is a great-grandson of Pratap Singh of Kapurthala.

== Biography ==
Singh was born on 29 October 1946 at Kapurthala House, Jalandhar, to father Kanwar Ranjit Singh and Mother Kanwarani Anjana Singh of Kapurthala, and was later adopted by Kanwarani Surjit Kaur, the widow of Captain Kanwar Prithvijit Singh of Kapurthala. He studied at The Doon School, Dehra Dun (I.S.C.). He was first elected to the Rajya Sabha (the Upper House of the Indian Parliament) in April 1982, representing the State of Maharashtra. He returned for a second term from April 1988 to April 1994.

In 1989, he married Kanwarani Vijay Thakur Singh, who is a diplomat of the Indian Foreign Service and is currently serving at the Ministry of External Affairs, India as Secretary (East).

Singh has been a delegate to several International Conferences as well as to the United Nations General Assembly a number of times. He has been a member of numerous committees of the Indian Parliament and has also done work in the field of perspective planning. He has written extensively in magazines and newspapers on issues mainly related to planning perspectives.

As chairman of his party's computer department, Singh has also driven initiatives to make more use of technology in election efforts, including putting publicity material, speeches and posters online, installing servers, setting up SMS software to facilitate the sending of bulk SMSs, and establishing a support team.

Singh supports dividing the larger Indian states into smaller units.

In 2010, he wrote a book of Hindi poetry entitled Kuch Shabd Kuch Lakeerein, published by Yatra Books, the Hindi imprint of Penguin India. The book was released at the Doon Literary Festival in April 2010.

== Controversies ==
In 1994, Singh was investigated, along with many other members of the Upper House of the Indian Parliament including the current Prime Minister of India, for seeking election from a state of which he was supposedly not a resident by Chief Election Commissioner T. N. Seshan. However, he expressed grudging admiration for the results Seshan achieved in ensuring free and fair elections in which all parties followed the rules. The matter regarding the anomaly in the law was finally settled by an amendment to the law and all these prosecutions have lapsed.

== Health issues ==
Singh has been overweight since childhood. Upon his election to Parliament, then-Prime Minister Indira Gandhi ordered Arun Nehru to help him lose weight as Singh weighed almost 160 kg; his weight dropped to as low as 108 kg once while he was hospitalised for a heart attack, but his weight increased again after the hospitalisation.

== Committee memberships ==
- Member of the Special Working Group of the Accommodation Committee for the 9th Asian Games in 1982
- Member of The Advisory Council of The Ministry of Textiles, 1984–89
- Member of The Working Group for the chapter on Textiles in the 7th Plan Document
- Member of the National Productivity Council, 1988
- Member, Public Accounts Committee (Fiscal Body of the Indian Parliament), Ninth Lok Sabha, 1990–91
- Member, Public Accounts Committee, Tenth Lok Sabha (1999–92), member of the Indian Council for Cultural Relations, 1989–90
- Member of the Indian Board of Forestry, 1990–91
- Member of the Parliament Standing Committee on Agriculture, Tenth Lok Sabha, 1992–93
- Member of the Joint Committee of Parliament for the Copyright Bill, 1992–93
- Member of the Parliament Standing Committee on Petroleum and Chemicals, Tenth Lok Sabha, 1993–94
- Ex Officio Member of the Publicity and Publication Committee, All India Congress Committee, Indian National Congress, ?-present

== Other positions ==
- Special Representative of Congress President and Prime Minister of India to The Working Group Set Up for the Elections to the Namibian Parliament, 1998
- Special Representative of Congress President and Prime Minister of India Rajiv Gandhi to Mozambique, 1989
- Special Representative of Congress President Rajiv Gandhi to Afghanistan, 1990
- Member of Indian parliamentary delegations to New Zealand −1986, Spain −1987, Colombia −1990
- Member of Indian parliamentary delegations to the International Parliamentary Union at Punta Del Este, Uruguay in 1990, New Delhi, 1994.
- Member of the Indian Delegation to the United Nations General Assembly for the 46th Session in 1991, the 47th Session in 1992, the 50th Session in 1995 and the 63rd Session in 2008
- Chairman, Computer Department, All India Congress Committee, Indian National Congress, ?-present

== Publications ==
- Author of Kuchh Shabd Kuchh Lakeerein (Hindi), (Yatra Books, 2010, ISBN 978-81-906510-4-2)
- Wrote various articles on politics, economics and perspective planning in: The Telegraph (Calcutta), The Daily (Mumbai), The Free Press Journal (Mumbai), The Hindustan Times (New Delhi), The Pioneer (New Delhi), The Tribune (Chandigarh), The Asian Age (New Delhi).
- Co-author of Congress Approach to Electoral Reforms (Congress Committee on Policy & Programmes (CCPP)), New Delhi, 1988; Power to the People. (CCPP), New Delhi, 1989; Power to the People – The Urban Imperative (CCPP), New Delhi, 1989.

== See also ==
- The Kapurthala Royal Collateral Families
- Pratap Singh of Kapurthala
- Bikrama Singh
