= Kunwar (title) =

Kunwar (also spelt Kanwar or Kuar or Kaur) is a title denoting the Prince.

The female versión is Kunwarani.

It is feudal title originating from the Indian subcontinent meaning "Son of Thakur" where Thakur means "Lord", “God” or “Master of the estate.”

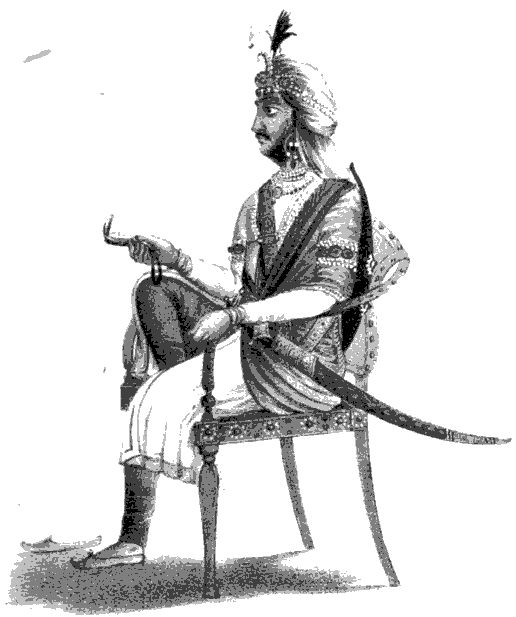
Kunwar (Prince) Nau Nihal Singh ruler of the Sikh empire.

People with title Kunwar includes:

- Kunwar Khalid Yunus (Member of National Assembly of Pakistan)
- Kunwar Amar
- Kunwar Narayan
- Kunwar Natwar Singh
- Kunwar Vikram Singh
- Kunwar Sone Singh Ponwar
- Kunwar Manvendra Singh
- Kunwar Digvijay Singh
- Kunwar Natwar Singh
- Kunwar Sarvraj Singh
- Kunwar Sarvesh Kumar Singh
- Kunwar Rewati Raman Singh
- Kunwar Singh (cricketer)
- Kunwar Jitin Prasad
- Kunwar Bhim Singh
- Kunwar Nau Nihal Singh
- Kunwar Inderjit Singh; 20th Prime Minister of Nepal. Royalty of Doti Region. Born as Indradhwoj Shahi later adopted title of Kunwar
