= Max Kaur =

Estonian politician (born 1969)

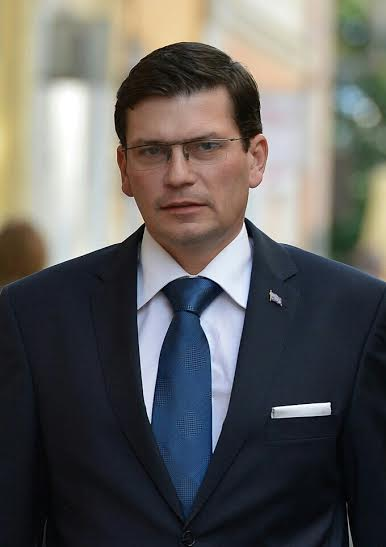
Max Kaur

Max Kaur (born Maksim Jermakov; 9 December 1969) is an Estonian politician. He is a member of the Centre Party. He was mayor of Mustvee 2013–2017. Since 2018 he was a Jõhvi municipality vice-governor. Since 2019 he was a Mayor of Jõhvi. Since 2025 he is a Mayor of Kohtla-Järve.

Max Kaur was born Maksim Jermakov in Tallinn, of mixed Jewish, Ukrainian and Greek heritage. His mother is ballerina Larissa Kaur. He studied law at Moscow International Independent University of Environmental and Political Sciences (IIUEPS), LL.B., and economics at Saint Petersburg State University of Engineering and Economics, MS in Economics. He earned his PhD in 2013 from Saint Petersburg State University of Economics.

Max Kaur was counsellor of the Mayor of Tallinn, Edgar Savisaar from 2002 to 2005. He was vice-mayor of Maardu from 2005 to 2006. Max Kaur was first elected to Tallinn City Council in the Estonian local elections 2009. He was elected Mayor of Mustvee in April 2013. He was re-elected in December 2013.

He was a founder and leader of the Estonian social movement against gambling. He is an author of the idea to create a unique sculpture in Tallinn against addiction.
