= Bikrama Singh =

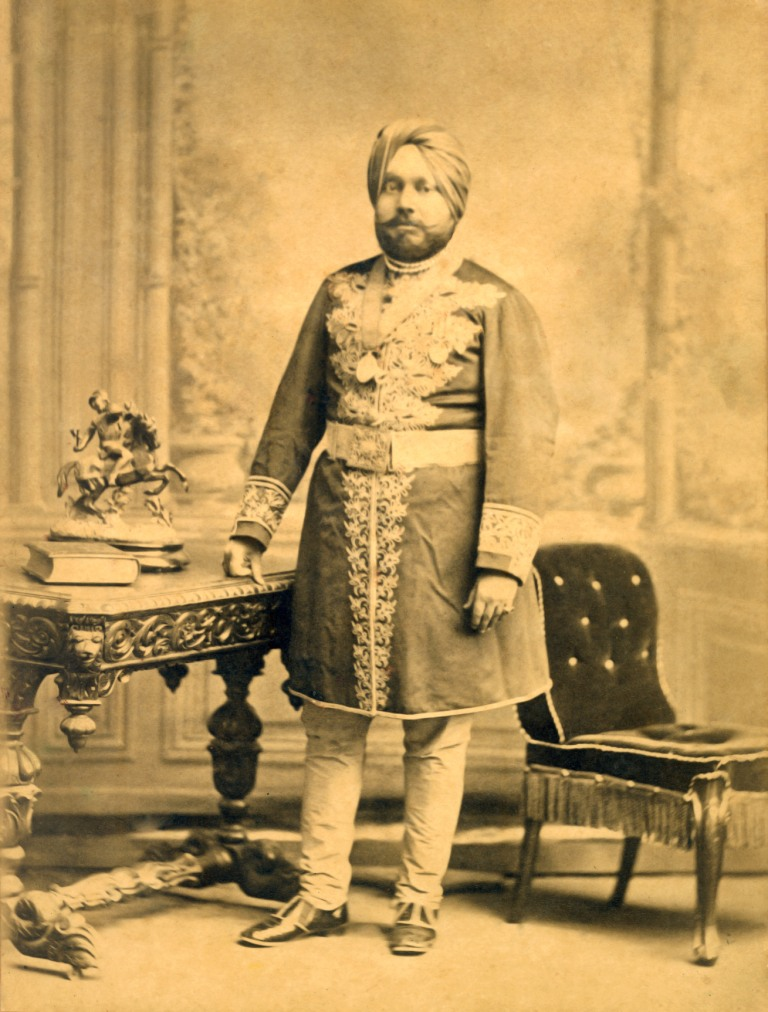
Kanwar Bikrama Singh Bahadur of Kapurthala

Kanwar Sri Bikrama Singh Bahadur (1835–8 May 1887) was a 19th-century Sikh leader. He was born in the Kapurthala ruling family as the son of Raja Nihal Singh and was passed-over in succession of his father in-favour of his brother, Randhir Singh, due to British influence. This would lead to a long-lasting dispute within the family.

== Early life and political contribution ==
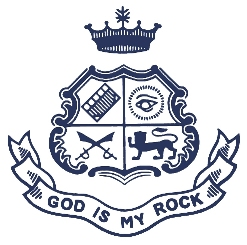
Crest of Bikrama Singh

Born in Kapurthala as the second son of Raja Nihal Singh of Kapurthala (from his second Rani, the philanthropist Mai Hiran). He was one of the main progenitors of the 19th Century Sikh Renaissance, being one of the founders of the Singh Sabha Movement aimed at a revival of the Gurudwaras as centres of worship and learning which ultimately culminated in the Gurudwara Reform movement and led to the liberation of the Gurudwaras from the clutches of the hereditary Mahants. He was married and two of his children were Pratap Singh of Kapurthala and Raja Sir Daljit Singh of Kapurthala.

He was also one of the supporters of the claims of Maharaja Duleep Singh of the Punjab, the son of the Maharaja Ranjit Singh and, along with the Sandhawalia Sardars, sought to muster support for Duleep Singh amongst the Sikh Sardars of the erstwhile Lahore Durbar.

== As patron of the arts and builder ==
He founded the Khalsa Press Lahore as well as the "Khalsa Akhbar", the first journal for the Sikhs.

He was well versed in Persian, Sanskrit, and Punjabi and a very eminent musicologist a great proponent of Modern Learning and of women's education, he was the Author of "Upma Sar Granth".

He was instrumental in saving the lives of the royal musicians at the Mughal Court of Delhi during the Indian Rebellion of 1857; he gave them shelter at his court in Kapurthala, thus laying the foundation of the Kapurthala Gharana of Hindustani Classical Music.

Bikrama Singh had constructed, as his personal residence, the first French inspired building in Kapurthala, the Elysee Palace. (His example was later followed by the francophile Maharaja Jagatjit Singh, who constructed the famous French inspired Jagatjit Palace at Kapurthala). When he relocated to Jullunder, he built for himself another residence, Bikram Hall; it has since been demolished, though the grounds, now referred to as Bikrampura, still bear his name.

== Dispute with the Raja of Kapurthala ==
His father Raja Nihal Singh wanted him to succeed to the throne but this was opposed by the British. His father's will, which entitled him to inherit large estates, was challenged by his brother, Raja Randhir Singh. After long litigation, a settlement was arrived at by which Bikrama Singh was given a pension by the state; under the terms of this settlement, Bikrama Singh left Kapurthala to settle in Jullunder.

== Settlement of estates through the Bikrama Singh Estates Act ==
He was the joint owner of the Kapurthala Estate in Awadh, Uttar Pradesh. When he sought a partition of this Estate his brother, Raja Randhir Singh opted to keep the Estate undivided and, instead, chose to compensate Bikrama Singh. A settled amount was deposited into a Trust which was used to procure a fresh Estate for Bikrama Singh. The lands finally vested in Bikrama Singh in the districts of Sitapur and Rae Bareli in the United Provinces (present day Uttar Pradesh) were formalized by the central government through the Bikrama Singh Estates Act 1883 (an unrepealed Act of the Government of India).

He died at Jullunder on 8 May 1887.

== See also ==
- Bikrama Singh's Estates Act
- The Kapurthala Royal Collateral Families
