= Amrit Kaur =

Indian politician (1889–1964)

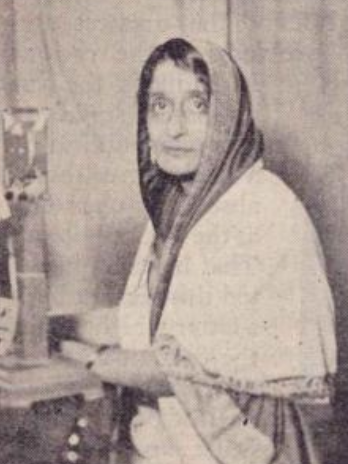
- Rajkumari Amrit Kaur, from a 1936 issue of The Indian Listener
- Born: 2 February 1887; Lucknow, North-Western Provinces, British India (present-day Uttar Pradesh, India)
- Died: 6 February 1964 (aged 77); New Delhi, India
- Organization(s): St John Ambulance, Tuberculosis Association, Indian Red Cross, All India Institute of Medical Sciences
- Political party: Indian National Congress
- Movement: Indian independence movement

Union Minister of Health and Family Welfare
- In office 16 August 1947 – 16 April 1957
- Prime Minister: Jawaharlal Nehru
- Preceded by: Post established
- Succeeded by: D. P. Karmakar (as MoS)

Personal details
- Parent(s): Harnam Singh; Priscilla Golaknath

Rajkumari Bibiji Amrit Kaur DStJ (née Ahluwalia; 2 February 1887 – 6 February 1964) was an Indian activist and politician. Following her long-lasting association with the Indian independence movement, she was appointed the first and the longest serving Health Minister of India in 1947 and remained in office until 1957. She also held the charge of Sports Minister and Urban Development Minister and was instrumental in setting up the National Institute of Sports, Patiala. During her tenure, Kaur ushered in several healthcare reforms in India and is widely remembered for her contributions to the sector and her advocacy of women's rights. Kaur was also a member of the Constituent Assembly of India, the body that framed the Constitution of India. She was the first Indian woman as a minister in central ministry.

== Life ==
Amrit Kaur was born on 2 February 1887 in Badshah Bagh, Lucknow University Campus, Lucknow, Uttar Pradesh (then North-Western Provinces), India. Kaur was born to Raja Sir Harnam Singh Ahluwalia, the younger son of the Raja Randhir Singh of Kapurthala. Harnam Singh left Kapurthala following a conflict over succession to the throne, becoming the manager of estates in the former princely state of Oudh. He later married Chatterjee's daughter, Priscilla Golaknath (later Rani Priscilla Kaur Sahiba), and they had ten children, of whom Amrit Kaur was the youngest, and their only daughter.

Kaur was raised as a Christian, and had her early education in Sherborne School for Girls in Dorset, England, and had her college education at Oxford University. After completing her education in England, she returned to India in 1918.

Kaur died in New Delhi on 6 February 1964. Although she was, at the time of her death, a practicing Christian, she was cremated according to family customs and her funeral was presided over by the SGPC. Kaur had never married, and had no children.

Today, her private papers are part of the Archives at the Nehru Memorial Museum & Library, at Teen Murti House, Delhi.

== Career ==
=== Participation in India's independence movement ===
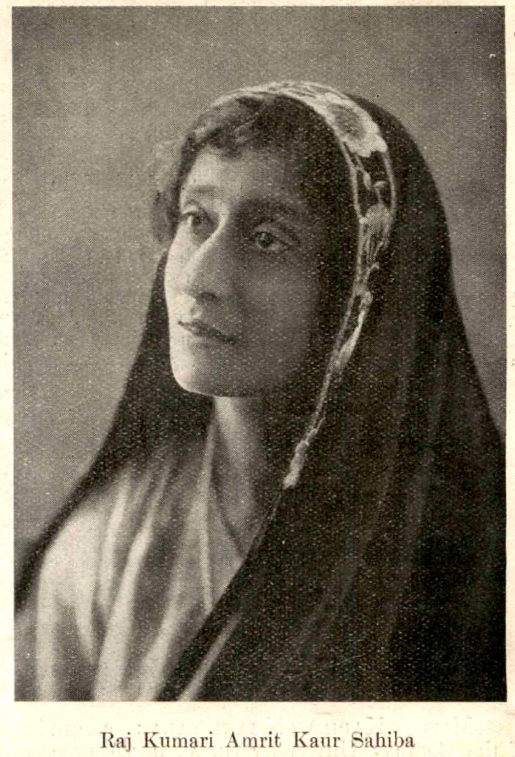
c. 1933

After her return to India from England, Kaur became interested in the Indian independence movement. Her father had shared close association with Indian National Congress leaders including Gopal Krishna Gokhale, who often visited them. Kaur was drawn to the thoughts and vision of Mahatma Gandhi, whom she met in Bombay (Mumbai) in 1919. Kaur worked as Gandhi's secretary for 16 years, and their correspondence was subsequently published as a volume of letters titled Letters to Rajkumari Amrit Kaur.

Following the Jallianwala Bagh massacre later that year, when the British forces shot and killed over 400 peaceful protestors in Amritsar, Punjab, Kaur became a strong critic of the British rule in India. She formally joined the Congress and began active participation in India's independence movement while also focusing on bringing about social reform. She was strongly opposed to the practice of purdah and to child marriage, and campaigned to abolish the devadasi system in India.

Kaur co-founded the All India Women's Conference in 1927. She was later appointed its secretary in 1930, and president in 1933. She was imprisoned by the British authorities for her participation in the Dandi March, led by Mahatama Gandhi in 1930. Kaur went to live at Gandhi's ashram in 1934 and adopted an austere lifestyle despite her aristocratic background.

As a representative of the Indian National Congress, in 1937 she went on a mission of goodwill to Bannu, North-West Frontier Province, colonial India (in the present-day Khyber-Pakhtunkhwa province of Pakistan). The British authorities charged her with sedition and imprisoned her.

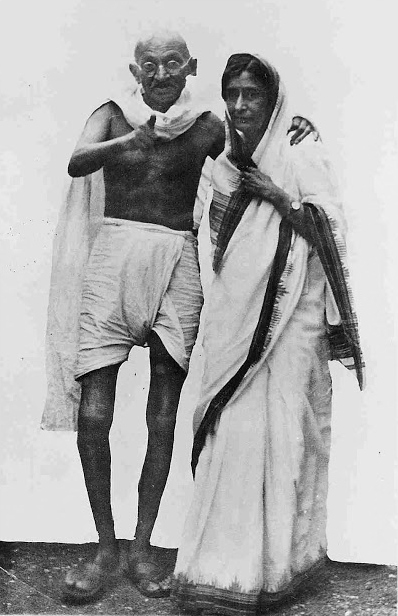
Rajkumari with Mahatma Gandhi, Shimla 1945

The British authorities appointed her as a member of the Advisory Board of Education, but she resigned from the position following her involvement with the Quit India Movement in 1942. She was imprisoned by the authorities for her actions during the time.

She championed the cause of universal suffrage, and testified before the Lothian Committee on Indian franchise and constitutional reforms, and before the Joint Select Committee of British Parliament on Indian constitutional reforms.

Kaur served as the Chairperson of the All India Women's Education Fund Association. She was a member of the Executive Committee of Lady Irwin College in New Delhi. She was sent as a member of the Indian delegation to UNESCO conferences in London and Paris in 1945 and 1946, respectively. She also served as a member of the Board of Trustees of the All India Spinners' Association.

Kaur worked to reduce illiteracy, and eradicate the custom of child marriages and the purdah system for women, which were then prevalent among some Indian communities.

=== Representative of the Christian Indian community ===
Raj Kumari Amrit Kaur was a Punjabi Christian and was linked with several Christian missionary organizations around the world. From 1947 to 1957, she served as the Minister of Health in India and as a result, she had close contact with the Prime Minister. Indian Christians thus made issues relevant to their community known to Raj Kumari Amrit Kaur, who delivered their concerns to him. Jawaharlal Nehru thus saw Raj Kumari Amrit Kaur as "a kind of representative of Christians in India". For example, in 1955, Kaur informed Nehru about the intimidation of Christians in the United Provinces' city of Meerut. Nehru then proceeded to forward two letters written by Kaur to the district magistrate there.

=== AIIMS (All India Institutes of Medical Sciences ) ===
On February 18, 1956, the then Minister of Health, Rajkumari Amrit Kaur, introduced a new bill in the Lok Sabha (House of the People). In her speech, Kaur said:

It has been one of my cherished dreams that for post graduate study and for the maintenance of high standards of medical education in our country, we should have an institute of this nature which would enable our young men and women to have their post graduate education in their own country.

The creation of a major central institute for post-graduate medical education and research had been earlier recommended by the Health survey of the government of India. By 1956, the AIIMS (All India Institutes of Medical Sciences) was formed as an autonomous institution through an Act of Parliament.

=== Member of the Constituent Assembly ===
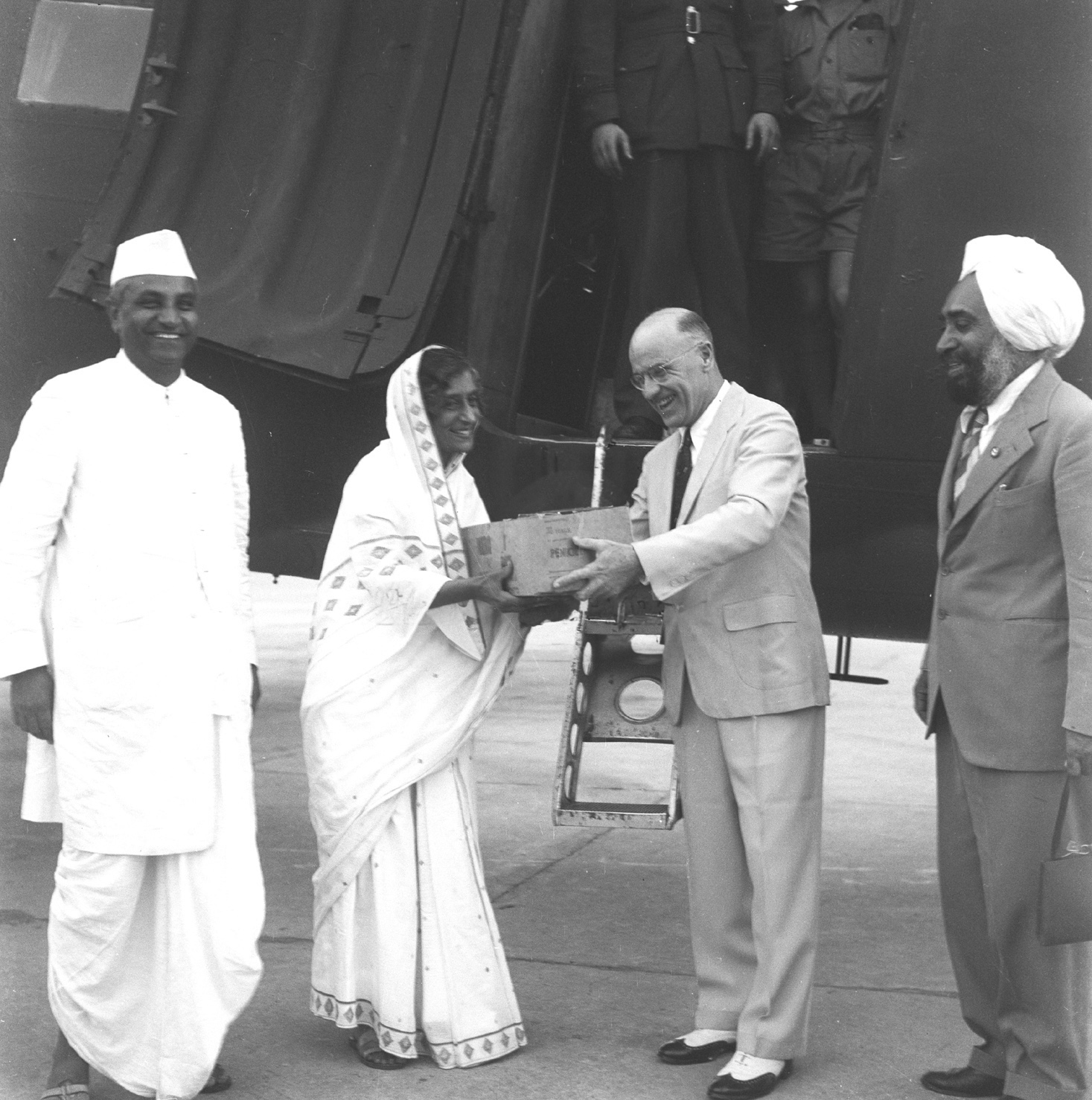
Ninety-three cases of penicillin, a gift from the Canadian Red Cross to India arrived at New Delhi in a special plane from Canada on 17 October 1947. Presenting the gift to Amrit Kaur, the then Health Minister in the Government of India at the Palam aerodrome. Jivraj Narayan Mehta, Director General of Health Services appears on the left and standing on the right is Sardar Balwant Singh Puri of the Indian Red Cross.

Following India's independence from the colonial rule in August 1947, Kaur was elected from the United Provinces to the Constituent Assembly of India, the government body that was assigned to design the Constitution of India. She was also a member of Sub-Committee on Fundamental Rights and Sub-Committee on Minorities. As a member of the Constituent Assembly, she supported a proposal for a Uniform Civil Code in India. She also advocated for universal franchise, opposed affirmative action for women, and debated the language concerning the protection of religious rights. She envisioned the idea of constructive citizenship, emphasizing the role of social service and community engagement

=== Health Minister ===
After India's independence, Amrit Kaur became part of Jawaharlal Nehru's first Cabinet; she was the first woman to hold Cabinet rank, serving for ten years. In January 1949, she was appointed a Dame of the Order of Saint John (DStJ). She was assigned the Ministry of Health. In 1950, she was elected the president of World Health Assembly. As Health Minister, Kaur led a major campaign to fight the spread of malaria in India. She also led the campaign to eradicate tuberculosis and was the driving force behind the largest B.C.G vaccination programme in the world. In 1956, Kaur was awarded an honorary degree of Doctor of Laws by the Princeton University.

Kaur believed that the only proper method of birth control was continence, and promoted the rhythm method of birth control in India. Government money was not spent on contraceptives, and instead women were given beads to keep track of "safe" days (green) and "baby" days (black). Some women refused to use the beads, believing that only cows should wear that kind of bead, while others were embarrassed or believed that the beads would guarantee against conception.

Kaur was also instrumental in founding the Indian Council of Child Welfare. Kaur served as the Chairperson of the Indian Red Cross society for fourteen years. During her leadership, the Indian Red Cross did a number of pioneering works in the hinterlands of India. She served on the boards of governmental bodies aimed at fighting tuberculosis and leprosy. She started the Amrit Kaur College of Nursing and the National Sports Club of India.

Rajkumari Amrit Kaur played a key role in the development of College of Nursing, New Delhi (established in 1946), Government of India renamed the college as Rajkumari Amrit Kaur College of Nursing in her honor.

From 1957 until her death in 1964, she remained a member of Rajya Sabha. Between 1958 and 1963 Kaur was the president of the All-India Motor Transport Congress in Delhi. Until her death, she continued to hold the presidencies of the All India Institute of Medical Sciences, the Tuberculosis Association of India, and the St. John's Ambulance Corps. She also was awarded the Rene Sand Memorial Award, and was named TIME Magazine's Woman of the Year in 1947.

=== Posthumous tribute ===
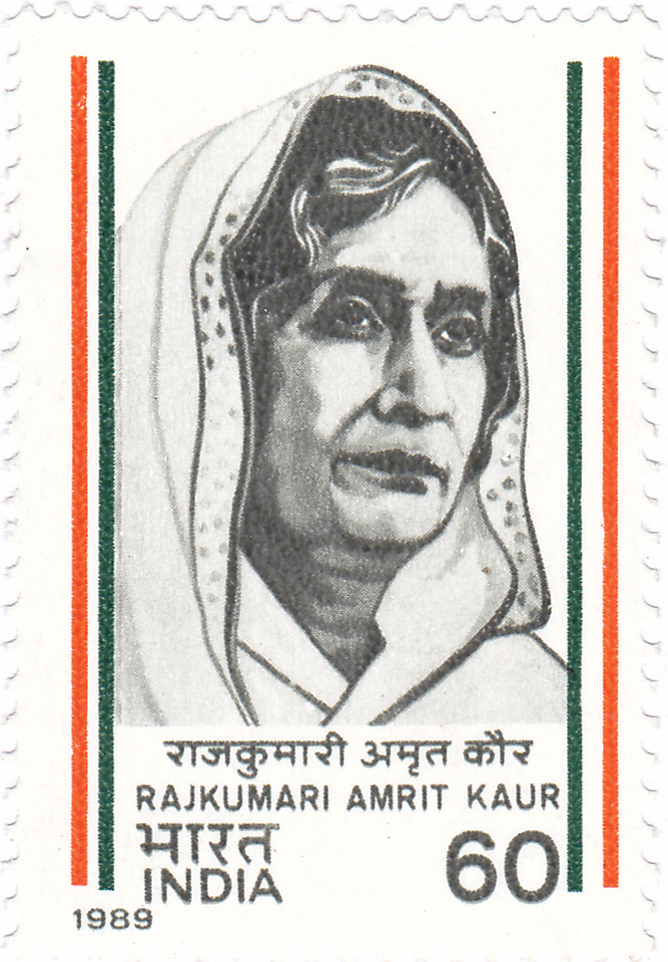
Amrit Kaur 1989 stamp of India

In 2019, Time created 89 new covers to celebrate women of the year starting from 1920; it chose Kaur for 1947.
