= Villa Buona Vista =

European-style villa in Kapurthala district

Coordinates: 1°24′45″N 75°22′46″E

- Alternative names: Villa Kothi

General information
- Type: Villa
- Architectural style: Italianate style
- Location: Kanjli, Kapurthala district, Punjab, India
- Year built: 1894–1896
- Client: Jagatjit Singh
- Owner: Sukhjit Singh

Design and construction
- Architect: J.O.S. Elmore

The Villa Buona Vista (or Villa Kothi) is a European-style villa in Kanjli in the Kapurthala district of Punjab, India.

== History ==
Jagatjit Singh, the Maharaja of Kapurthala, had a strong interest in architecture and, during his reign, commissioned a number of buildings within his dominions and outside them. He commissioned this in 1894. It was completed in 1896.

== Architecture ==
It was designed by J.O.S. Elmore in Italianate style. It was built on the Kanjli Wetland, which was a favourite resort for picnics, boating and fishing. It features a low tower in the corner with a pyramid-shaped roof.

== Features ==
Its grounds contain hundreds of fruit trees which include various varieties of mangoes and loquat. A 15-foot 10-inch stuffed gharial, which was a man-eater and was shot by Jagatjit Singh on 13 January 1913, is hung on the walls of its veranda.

== Usage ==
It was primarily used as a hunting lodge. Jagatjit Singh and Anita Delgado were married here in accordance with the Sikh rites and in the presence of the officials of the state and other guests. Following their marriage, more buildings were added to it in the Spanish style, and the villa was converted into a residence for Anita. The villa later served as the residence of Paramjit Singh, when he was Tikka Raja, and his wife, Brinda Devi. When Edward VIII, as the Prince of Wales, paid an informal visit to Kapurthala on 12 March 1922, he also visited the villa. After Brinda fell out of favour with her husband and the royal family for not producing a male heir, the villa was reserved exclusively for her residence. During her time there, Brinda entertained a number of guests, including Maria Maria Pavlovna and Charles Baskerville. It now serves as the residence of Sukhjit Singh, the grandson of Jagatjit Singh, and houses many objets d'art and items of furniture that were once held at the Jagatjit Palace.

== Gallery ==
Villa stands framed by lush trees

Exterior of the villa

Exterior of the villa

Exterior of the villa

Exterior of the villa

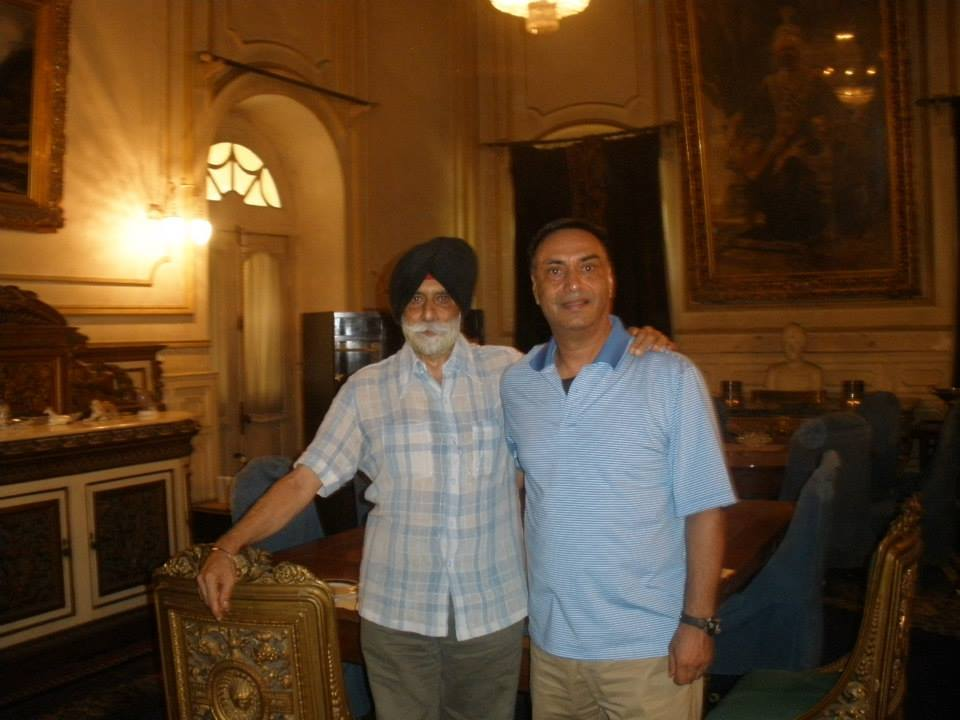
Sukhjit Singh is pictured here with his friend inside the Villa

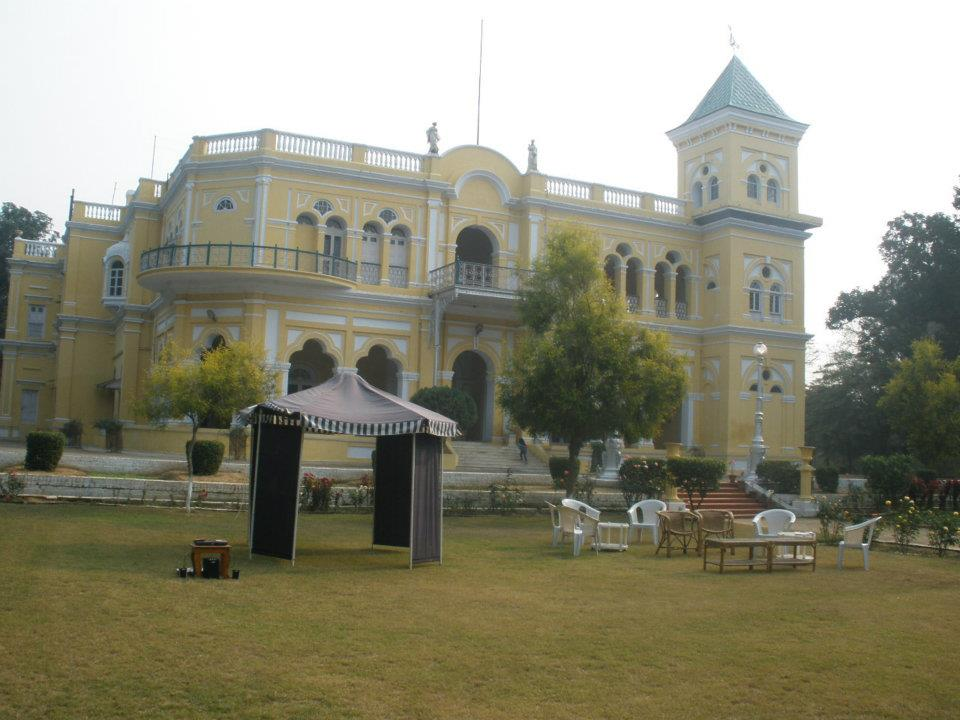
Villa from outside
