= Tara Devi of Kapurthala =

Czech-born Indian queen consort (1911–1946)

Maharani Tara Devi
- Queen consort of Kapurthala
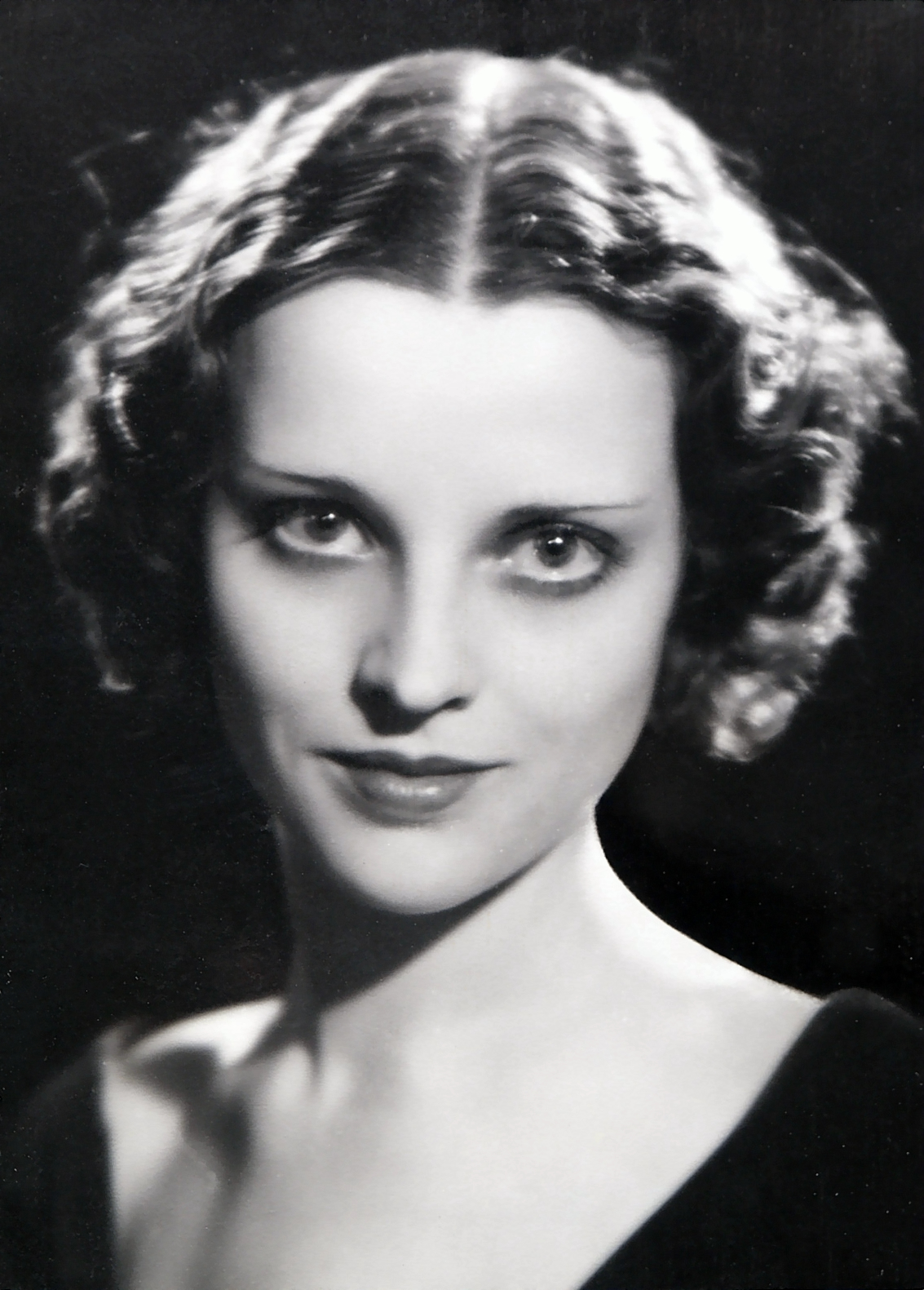
- Born: Eugenie Grosup; 22 January 1911; Vienna, Austria
- Died: 8 December 1946 (aged 35); Qutb Minar, (Note: Many sources mention that she fell from Qutb Minar. Another version is given by scholar John Butler; he says she fell from a bridge.) Delhi, India
- Burial: New Delhi, India
- Husband: Jagatjit Singh (m. 1942; sep. 1945)

Tara Devi (22 January 1911 – 8 December 1946), born Eugenie Grosup, was a Czech actress and dancer who became the sixth wife of Maharajah Jagatjit Singh of Kapurthala, India, in 1942. They had met several years earlier in Vienna, where she played Anitra in Henrik Ibsen's drama Peer Gynt at the Burgtheater.

In India, the Grosups resided in the women's quarters at the palace in Kapurthala. The maharajah's grandson Brigadier Sukkhjit Singh notes in his biography of his grandfather, that he asked Grosup to marry him after she received a deportation notice to leave India and return to Nazi-occupied Europe. Her mother persuaded her to agree to the marriage, though Tara was far from being in favour with the British in India or with the maharajah's household. Both her grandmother and mother died suddenly during a trip to Mussoorie in 1945. There, Devi became convinced that they were poisoned and she suffered a nervous breakdown. She had already been experiencing recurrent bouts of depression.

The couple separated in 1945, and subsequent plans to allow her passage to the United States were unsuccessful. On 8 December 1946, she fell to her death from the Qutb Minar, Delhi.

== Early life ==
Tara Devi, also known as Nina, was born Eugenie Grosup to actress Maria Eleanora Grosup (1889–1945) in Munzwardeingasse, Vienna. (Note: Most sources refer to Tara Devi as nicknamed Nina. Diwan Jarmani Dass, a former Kapurthala minister during Jagatjit's reign, dedicated one chapter to Devi in his book Maharani. In it, he refers to the mother as Nina and grandmother as Pura.) The Viennese Catholic Church registry baptism records of 1918 document her date of birth as 22 January 1911 and describe her as an illegitimate female. The National Archives of India hold a registration document with her name misspelled as 'Engenie' and records her year of birth as 1914. The Embassy of the Czech Republic in New Delhi names her father as the Hungarian Count Karátsonyi. Her guardian was Leon Pistol.

In 1935, she was selected to play Anitra in Henrik Ibsen's drama Peer Gynt at the Burgtheater in Vienna. According to Pistol, it was at one of her performances that Maharaja Jagatjit Singh first saw her.

== Later life ==
Grosup and her family, including her grandmother, left Prague in 1937. In May 1939, the 28-year-old Eugenie Grosup, her mother Maria Grosup, and the 66-year-old Maharajah are named in the passenger list of the Tatsuta Maru going from Yokohama, Japan, to San Francisco, US.

In India, the Grosups resided in the women's quarters at the palace in Kapurthala. The maharajah's grandson Brigadier Sukkhjit Singh notes in his biography of his grandfather, Prince, Patron and Patriarch (2019), that he asked Grosup to marry him after she received a deportation notice to leave India and return to Nazi-occupied Europe. Her mother persuaded her to agree to the marriage and in 1942, Eugenie Grosup married the maharajah at Mussoorie. She was subsequently known as Tara Devi of Kapurthala. According to Sambuy, she was far from being in favour with the British in India or with the maharajah's household; they saw her as a commoner. Both her grandmother and mother died suddenly during a trip to Mussoorie in 1945. There, Devi became convinced that they were poisoned and she suffered a nervous breakdown. According to Sukkhjit Singh, she had already been experiencing recurrent bouts of depression, made worse by news from Europe of family and friends in concentration camps. Subsequently, the couple separated and she moved into a hotel in Delhi. Plans to allow her passage to her Austrian friends in the United States failed as British authorities denied her a passport.

== Death ==
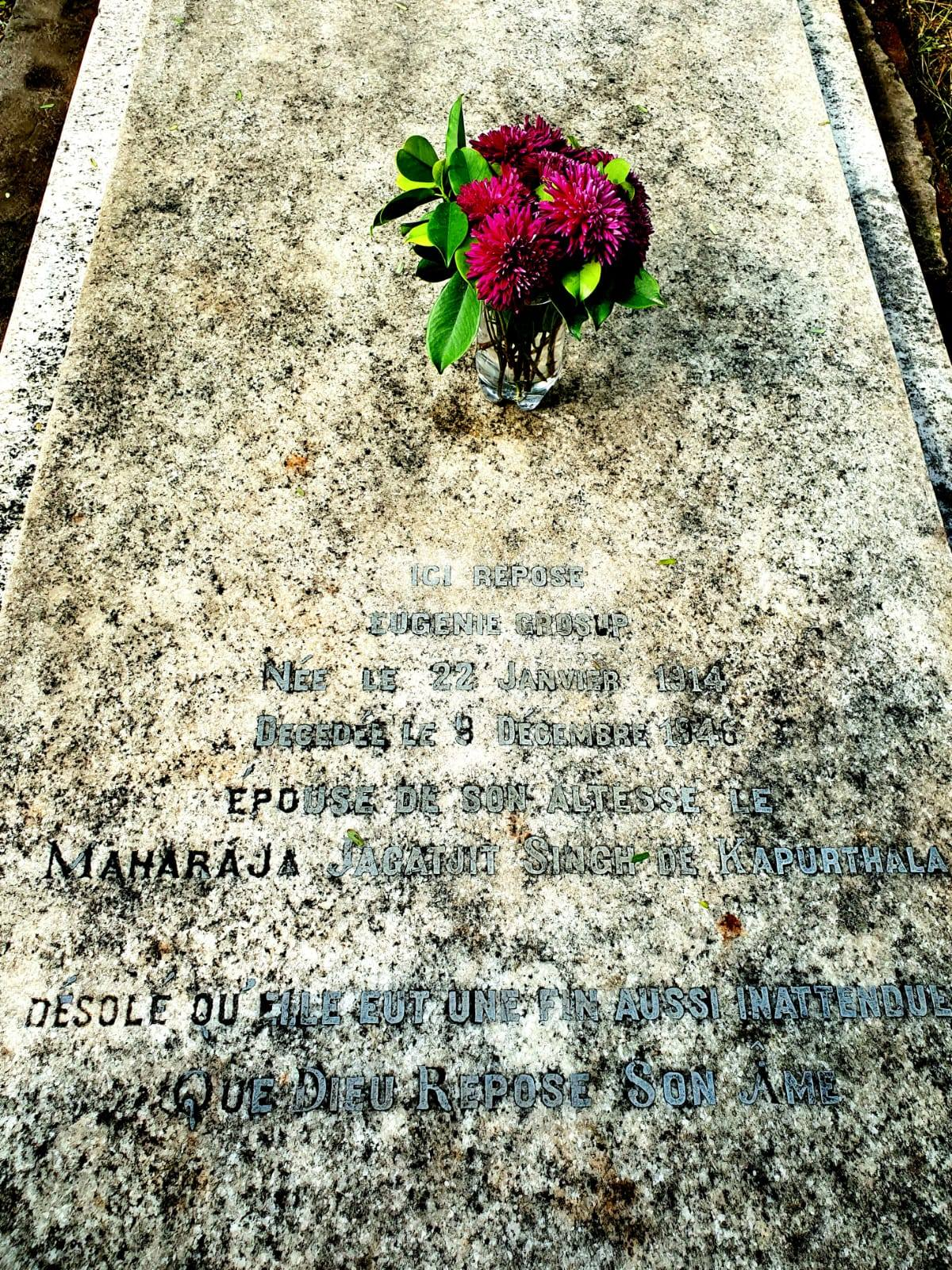
Grave at the Nicholson Cemetery, New Delhi

On 8 December 1946, she left the Maidens Hotel, where she was residing, and was driven to the Qutb Minar, from which she fell to her death with her two Pomeranian dogs. Newspapers of the time reported her death as occurring on 9 December, that state schools, colleges and offices in Kapurthala closed as a mark of respect to her memory, and that an inquest into her death was to take place. Pistol, then living in New York, had suspected "foul play" and told the press that Devi's letters to him "told of a constant fear of death, and that she planned to come to the United States". She is buried at the Nicholson Cemetery, New Delhi.
