= Jagatjit Palace =

Palace in Kapurthala

General information
- Type: Palace
- Location: Kapurthala, India
- Coordinates: 31.37425002315069°N 75.39192395767236°E
- Current tenants: Sainik School, Kapurthala
- Named for: Jagatjit Singh
- Year built: 1902–1908
- Construction started: 1902
- Completed: 1908
- Cost: 3,400,000 rupees
- Client: Jagatjit Singh
- Owner: Government of Punjab

Technical details
- Floor count: 2
- Grounds: 245 acres

Design and construction
- Architects: Alexandre Marcel; Paul Boyer
- Engineer: H.J.A. Bowden; Raghunandan Lal

Other information
- Number of rooms: 50

Jagatjit Palace was the residence of the rulers of Kapurthala from 1908 until 1961. It was commissioned by Jagatjit Singh in 1902 and was sold by his grandson Sukhjit Singh (Note: Upon the death of Paramjit Singh on 19 July 1955, Sukhjit Singh succeeded him as the Maharaja of Kapurthala, and his succession was recognised by the President of India on behalf of the Government of India.) (Note: On 6 September 1970, the President of India derecognised him as the ruler of Kapurthala on behalf of the Government of India.) to the Government of Punjab on 17 May 1961.

It now houses the Sainik School, Kapurthala.

== Design ==
Jagatjit Singh had a strong interest in French culture and language. In 1900, he began to think about a European-style residence for himself and later commissioned the French architects Alexandre Marcel and Paul Boyer to design the palace. Its design drew inspiration from the Château de Versailles and the Château de Fontainebleau.

== Construction ==
The palace construction began in 1902 and was completed in 1908. The work was supervised by H. J. A. Bowden, an executive engineer whose services were lent to Kapurthala by the Government of India on 7 April 1902, and Raghunandan Lal, the state engineer. The palace cost 3,400,000 rupees to build. It was considered an important project of the time because it provided employment to local workers and artisans during a prolonged period of famine and hardship, and enabled them to learn European methods of building and decoration which subsequently helped many of them to secure work on similar projects elsewhere in India.

== Architecture and interior ==
The palace has two storeys built over a high basement. The ground floor contained reception rooms and a large hall leading to the throne room, while the upper floor housed the private apartments of the royal family. The principal façade was decorated with sculptures by French artists.

The palace contained 50 rooms, including reception halls, guest suites, a library, smoking rooms and billiard rooms. Their decoration drew on the Louis XIV style, the Louis XV style and the Georgian style. The Grand Salon was decorated in the Louis XV style, with white and gold ornamentation, gilt furniture and Aubusson tapestries. The Great Banqueting Hall followed the Louis XIV style and featured a painted ceiling. The principal salons were decorated with paintings by French artists, and the Grand Salon had a full ceremonial portrait of Jagatjit Singh by Théobald Chartran.

The palace's decorative works were produced in Paris under the supervision of Marcel and Boyer before being shipped to India. Its interiors were furnished by the London-based firm Waring & Gillow, while the baths were fitted with pink marble sourced from Carrara in Italy.

== Sale ==
On 17 May 1961, Sukhjit Singh sold the palace and 245 acres of adjoining land to the Government of Punjab for 1,610,000 rupees. Following the sale, a number of the palace's works of art and items of furniture were transferred to Villa Buona Vista. The mutation of the property in favour of the state government was not completed until 28 May 1980.

== Subsequent use ==
In 1961, the palace and 100 acres of its surrounding land were leased to the Sainik Schools Society, which established Sainik School, Kapurthala on the premises.

== Dispute ==
On 26 November 2008, Sukhjit Singh's grandson, Suryajit Singh, issued legal notices to the state and central governments and other authorities, seeking the cancellation of the 1961 sale deed and the return of the palace to his family. He argued that the palace and its adjoining 245 acres constituted ancestral joint-family property governed by the Mitakshara school of Hindu law. He also raised concerns over a proposed sale of the palace to a private company for conversion into a hotel.
