= Amarjit =

Amarjit or Amarjeet is an Indian given name meaning "eternal triumph". Notable people with the given name include:

- Amarjit Singh Bal (1940–2010), Indian Army officer
- Amarjeet Singh Bedi (fl. 1981–present), Indian commander
- Amarjeet Bhagat (born 1968), Indian politician
- Amarjit Chandan (born 1946), British-Punjabi writer
- Amarjit Chopra (fl. 2010), Indian chartered accountant
- Amarjeet Dhanda (fl. 2019–present), Indian politician
- Amarjit Singh Dulat (born 1940), Indian intelligence officer
- Amarjeet Gill, Canadian politician
- Amarjeet Kaur (born 1952), Indian politician
- Amarjit Kaur (born 1939), Indian politician
- Amarjeet Kushwaha (born 1973), Indian activist, lawyer and politician
- Amarjit Kaypee (born 1960), Indian cricketer
- Amarjit Singh Kiyam (born 2001), Indian footballer
- Amarjeet Singh Marwa (born 1947), Kenyan field hockey player
- Amarjeet Singh Nagi (born 1993), Indian track cyclist
- Amarjeet Shukla (born 1982), Indian actor
- Amarjit Singh (born 1970), British wrestler
- Amarjit Singh Rana (born 1960), Indian field hockey player
- Amarjit Singh Sahi (c. 1957–2012), Indian politician
- Amarjit Singh Samra (born 1943), Indian politician
- Amarjit Singh Sandhu (born 1954), Ugandan field hockey player
- Amarjeet Sohi (born 1964), Canadian politician
- Amarjit Singh Ahluwalia (1940–2010), Maharajkumar of Kapurthala
