= Amarjit Singh Ahluwalia =

Maharajkumar of Kapurthala

Amarjit Singh
- Maharajkumar of Kapurthala
- Born: 5 August 1893
- Died: 14 September 1944 (aged 51); Srinagar
- Spouse: Sophie Adjemoff (m. 1922)
Names
- Amarjit Singh
- House: Kapurthala
- Dynasty: Ahluwalia
- Father: Jagatjit Singh
- Mother: Parvati Kaur
- Education: Collège de Normandie; Theresian Military Academy; Christ Church, Oxford
- Military career
- Allegiance: British Raj
- Branch: British Indian Army
- Rank: Lieutenant colonel

Amarjit Singh (5 August 1893 – 14 September 1944) was a member of the royal house of Kapurthala. He saw action in the First World War and later held several senior civil and military appointments in the State's administration.

== Early life and education ==
Singh with his father and brothers.

Amarjit was born on 5 August 1893. His parents were Jagatjit Singh, the Maharaja of Kapurthala, and his second wife, Parvati Kaur, who was from a Katoch family and hailed from Kangra. In 1922, he married Sophie Adjemoff in Paris. He had three brothers, Paramjit Singh, Mahijit Singh and Ajit Singh, and a sister, Amrit Kaur. He was educated at the Collège de Normandie in Clères, the Theresian Military Academy and Christ Church, Oxford.

== Military career ==
Upon the outbreak of the First World War, his father was one of the first Indian rulers who placed the resources of his state at the disposal of the Crown. On 31 December 1914, George V appointed Amarjit as a temporary and honorary Second Lieutenant in the Indian Army. During the war, he served with the Indian Corps with distinction for more than a year in France and Flanders. He served in France with the 3rd (Lahore) Division. He was promoted to the honorary rank of Captain in 1918. He also served as a recruiting officer. He served as an aide-de-camp to Baron Birdwood, the Commander-in-Chief of India. When Henri Gouraud visited India in 1928, Baron Birdwood assigned Amarjit to accompany him on his tour of the country. This was because Gouraud spoke neither English nor any Indian languages, and Amarjit spoke fluent French. Before leaving India, Gouraud personally commended Amarjit Singh to Birdwood and praised him for his excellent service as a Staff Officer. He was promoted to the honorary rank of Major on 18 January 1930. On 3 April 1942, George VI promoted him to the honorary rank of Lieutenant colonel.

== Career ==
During his father's reign, he was associated with high positions in the civil and military administration of the Kapurthala. He served as the Secretary of Education and of Police. Later, his father appointed him Director of the state's Department of Education. During his tenure, he took an active and personal interest in the educational advancement of the State's children. He provided scholarships to students from his private purse and introduced organised aquatic sports. He also served as Director of Police. Later on, he served as Inspector-General of Police. He also served as Household Minister and the commandant of the state forces. He also served as vice-president and Army Member of the State Council of Kapurthala.

== Death ==
He died on 14 September 1944 after a brief illness at Srinagar.

== Titles and honours ==
=== Titles ===
Amarjit, being a son of the ruler of Kapurthala, was initially known as Rajkumar. On 12 December 1911, when his father was granted the title of Maharaja, Amarjit's title was changed to Maharajkumar, which he held until his death. His titles are listed below: where two dates are shown, the first indicates the date of receiving the title, and the second indicates the date of its loss or renunciation.

- 5 August 1893 – 12 December 1911: Rajkumar Sri Amarjit Singh of Kapurthala.
- 12 December 1911 – 14 September 1944: Maharajkumar Sri Amarjit Singh of Kapurthala.

=== Honours ===
He was awarded the 1914–15 Star, the British War Medal and the Victory Medal. He was also awarded the King's Indian Recruiting Medal. He was made a Companion of the Order of the Indian Empire on 3 June 1935. He was also a recipient of the King George V Silver Jubilee Medal and the King George VI Coronation Medal. In 1938, he was appointed Commandeur of the Legion of Honour.
