= Jagatjit Singh Diamond Jubilee Medal =

Award

The Jagatjit Singh Diamond Jubilee Medal, commonly referred to as the Diamond Jubilee Medal, was a commemorative decoration instituted in 1937 to mark the sixtieth anniversary of Jagatjit Singh’s accession to the throne of the princely state of Kapurthala in 1877.

== Background ==
Upon the death of his father, Kharak Singh, in September 1877, Jagatjit Singh, then aged five, succeeded to the throne as the Maharaja of Kapurthala. His formal installation took place on 16 October 1877 and was officiated by Robert Egerton, the then Lieutenant-Governor of the Punjab. In 1937, following his sixty years on the throne of Kapurthala, he celebrated his Diamond Jubilee. To commemorate the occasion, this medal was issued.

== Design ==
- On the obverse, it features a full-face bust of Jagatjit Singh, depicted wearing a high-necked tunic, a turban, a sash, and his medals. Along the surrounding border, the following inscription appears: H.H. MAHARAJA JAGATJIT SINGH OF KAPURTHALA.
- On the reverse, the medal bears a four-line inscription. The first line, in Urdu, reads Akal Sahai (transl. With God's Grace); the second, in Gurmukhi, reads Ek Onkar (transl. one God); the third, in Persian, reads Jublee Ilmas (transl. Diamond Jubilee); and the fourth states Maharaja Jagatjit Singh Wali-i-Riyasat-i-Kapurthala (transl. Maharaja Jagatjit Singh, Ruler of the State of Kapurthala).
- The medal measures 33 mm in diameter and is made of silver.
- The ribbon is 38 mm wide and features white stripes at the centre and edges, each measuring 4 mm. Between the outermost blue edges, which are 2 mm wide, there are two dark blue stripes, each measuring 11 mm.
- The ribbon is suspended from a plain bar.

== See also ==
- Nishan-i-Iftikhar (Kapurthala)
