= Prince, Patron and Patriarch =

2019 book about an Indian Maharajah

- Author: Brigadier Sukhjit Singh, Cynthia Meera Frederick
- Language: English
- Genre: History
- Publisher: Roli Books
- Publication date: 2019
- Publication place: India
- Pages: 255
- ISBN: 978-81-938608-5-4

Prince, Patron and Patriarch: Maharaja Jagatjit Singh of Kapurthala is a book about Jagatjit Singh (1872-1949), the last ruling Maharajah of the princely state of Kapurthala during British rule in India. It is authored by his grandson Brigadier Sukhjit Singh, in collaboration with conservation architect Cynthia Meera Frederick, who conceived and seeded the idea for the book. Brig Sukhjit says Cynthia persuaded him to co-author the book to do justice to this exceptional royal. It was published by Roli Books in 2019. Pramod Kumar K G is the consulting editor. The book gives detailed account of the building of the Palace at Kapurthala by Alexandre Marcel and Paul Boyer.

== Publication ==
Prince, Patron and Patriarch: Maharaja Jagatjit Singh of Kapurthala was published by Roli Books in 2019.

== Content ==
The book has 255 pages, beginning with an introduction and preface, followed by 22 chapters, and ends with an epilogue, notes and a bibliography. There is no index. It is interspersed throughout with photographs which include rare archival images alongside contemporary photography by Karam K. Puri.
