= Nishan-i-Iftikhar (Kapurthala) =

Award

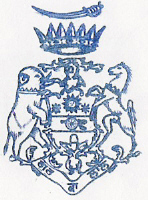
Awarded by the Maharaja of Kapurthala
- Type: Order
- Established: 1914; 112 years ago
- Country: Kapurthala
- Motto: Pro rege et patria
- Status: Dormant since 1947
- Founder: Jagatjit Singh
- Sovereign: Sukhjit Singh

The Nishan-i-Iftikhar (Urdu: نشانِ افتخار, lit. 'Order of Glory/Pride') was a military and civilian decoration of the Indian princely state of Kapurthala.

== Description ==
This order was instituted in 1914 by Jagatjit Singh, Maharaja of Kapurthala.

It was awarded in three classes: first, second, and third. The First Class was awarded to premier state officials and members of the household staff. The Second Class was conferred upon First Class state officials and commissioned officers of the state forces. The Third Class was reserved for other deserving individuals.

All three classes of the Order were likely designed by the Paris-based firm Arthus-Bertrand. The Order motto was Pro Rege et Patria (Latin for "For the King and Country").

== See also ==
- Jagatjit Singh Diamond Jubilee Medal
