= Kanjli Wetland =

Lake in India

Kanjli Wetland and Kanjli Lake
- Location within Punjab
- Location: Punjab
- Coordinates: 31.42°N 75.37°E
- Type: Freshwater
- Primary inflows: Kali Bein rivulet
- Basin countries: India
- Surface area: 490 ha (1,200 acres)
- Average depth: 3.05 m (10.0 ft)
- Max. depth: 7.62 m (25.0 ft)
- Surface elevation: 210 m (690 ft)
- Settlements: Kapurthala

Ramsar Wetland
- Official name: Kanjli
- Designated: 22 January 2002
- Reference no.: 1160

Kanjli Wetland is a man-made Wetland that subsumes the Kanjli Lake, and is located in the Kapurthala district of Punjab state in India. It was created in 1870 by constructing the headworks across the perennial Bien River, a tributary of the Beas River to provide irrigation facilities to the hinterland. The rich biodiversity of the wetland comprising aquatic, mesophytic and terrestrial flora and fauna including some important species of plants and animals was recognized internationally by the Ramsar Convention in 2002 by designating the Kanjli Lake in the List of Wetlands of International Importance. In this context, it is reported that the Punjab State which has 14 wetlands covering an area of 225.76 km^{2} (2% of the geographical area of the State) has the unique position of three of its wetlands viz., the Kanjli Wetland covering an area of 490 ha of which the Kanjli Lake water spread is 184 ha), the Harike Wetland (4100 ha) and the Ropar Wetland (1365 ha) chosen by the Ministry of Environment and Forest (MoE&F), Government of India for their conservation and management are now also included in the Ramsar list covering a total area of 5650 ha; Kanjli is upstream of Harike wetland located in the Beas river basin while the Ropar wetland is in the Roopnagar district.

== Wetland ==
The Kanjli Wetland is one of the manmade wetlands in India identified by the Government of India, as per the Expert Group's (set up in 1983 by the Ministry of Environment and Forests) report published in 1990. Since the main article on Wetland does not cover the aspects of Indian wetlands, the work done in this regard in India is explained. The Expert Group has based its directory on the basis of the definition enunciated by the Ramsar International Convention on Wetlands:

" areas of marsh, fen, peatland, or water whether natural or artificial, permanent or temporary, with water that is static or flowing, fresh, brackish or salt, including areas of marine water the depth of which at low tide does not exceed six metres".

Further, considering the definition of wetlands given by Cowden in 1979 for classification of wetlands in the US, three key attributes of hydrology (the degree of flooding or soil saturation), wetland vegetation (hydrophytes) and hydric soils have also been considered for identification. In this list, mangroves are not included since it falls under a separate category.

The Expert Group's directory has made a distinction between Natural and Man-Made wetlands (including wetlands of less than 100 ha area). In India, in its 24 states and two union territories (as per the 1990 report), there are 2167 nos of natural wetlands with a total area of 1.45 million ha and Man-Made wetlands of 65,254 nos with total area of 2.59 million ha. The inland water bodies listed in the report covers lakes, tanks, reservoirs etc.

== Royal patronage ==
The erstwhile Maharaja of Kapurthala (Raja Randhir Singh - 1862 to 1870), built the headworks on the river Kali Bein which resulted in the creation of the Kanjli Wetland which subsumes the sparkling lake by the same name. The Maharaja also built a retreat, in the French architectural style, in the forest set in lovely natural scenery, on the banks of the Lake, which was named "The Villa" or the "Villa Buona Vista". His royal successors live in this retreat even now. The lake has been developed as a tourist destination with facilities for fishing and boating. A traditional Mela or exhibition is held here during Depavali festival.

== Access ==
The Kanjli ecological Wetland region around the village Kanjli is 4 km (2.5 mi) from the Kapurthala town, also the district headquarters, and is thus well connected by road network to all parts of the state and rest of the country.

== Hydrology ==
The Kali Bein River, originating near village Dhanoa, upstream of Budho Bark Regulator in Hoshiarpur District, formerly a main tributary of the Beas River feeds the Wetland and the Lake. The Bien has now become an independent river due to siltation and westward swing of the Beas River. Agricultural development dominates the catchment of the wetland. The Bien river has contributed to the formation of fertile plains by bringing down large sediment loads during floods. Depth of water in the Lake has a seasonal variation of 3.05 m (10 feet) to 7.62 m (25 feet) depending on the season and inflow discharge. Catchment area is mainly under agriculture. The wetland is in the semi-arid zone and receives an average annual rainfall of about 620 mm. The temperature varies from a maximum of 45^{0} C in summer to an average of 6^{0}C during winter with occasionally freezing temperatures.

The Kali Bein and its wetland provide water supply for agriculture in the Kapurthala district, recharges the ground water, drains excessive rainwater from sensitive crops like wheat, potato, etc. and acts as a sponge by absorbing the flood waters.

== Water quality ==
The water and sludge quality of the Wetland has been studied by the Punjab Pollution Control Board Their report indicates that quality generally conforms to Class 'B' with some degree of quality degradation to Class 'D' sometimes during December.

From a satellite imagery study of the wetland it has been inferred that Kanjli Lake could be categorised under low turbidity class (dark blue hue) during pre-monsoon period and moderate turbidity class (medium blue) during post monsoon season which is indicative of regimentation occurring in the lake during post monsoon season.

== Flora and fauna ==
The flora and fauna recorded in the Wetland and the Kanjli Lake within it (Some of them are pictured in the gallery) are the following.

=== Flora ===
- Twelve varieties of trees recorded in the wetland are Acacia arabica, Albizia lebbeck, Azadirachta indica, Dalbergia sissoo, Eucalyptus hybrid, Ficus bengalensis, Mangifera indica, Melia azedarach, Morus alba, Prosopis juliflora, Syzygium cumini and Ziziphus mauritiana.
- Shrubs recorded are: Calotropis procera, Ipomoea crassicaulis and Tamarix dioca
- Herbs noted are Saccharum spontaneum, Tripidium bengalense (synonym Saccharum munja), Scirpus sp. and other common herbs.

=== Aqua flora ===
11 species of aquaflora, 34 species of zooplankton and 15 species of macro invertebrates have been reported.

=== Aqua fauna ===
According to the District Gazetteer and the study done by the National Environmental Engineering Research Institute (NEERI), 17 fish species (in Bein river and the lake) have been reported which includes the common fish species of Catla catla, Channa marulius (great snakehead), Cythus striatus, Cirrhinus mrigala, Labeo calbasu and Labeo rohita.

The tortoise is the common reptile reported in the area.

=== AviFauna ===
Over 40 resident bird species and 16 migratory species have been reported from the area. The migratory birds include various species of goose, white-eyed pochard, wigeon, Tufted Duck, common teal, large whistling teal, pintail, mallard, White Wagtail, Citrine Wagtail, Red-breasted Flycatcher, Black-winged Stilt, Common Chiffchaff, and shoveller.

Resident bird species include Gray Francolin, Indian Spot-billed Duck, Alexandrine Parakeet, Indian Thick-knee, White-browed Wagtail, Gray-throated Martin, and Red-naped Ibis.

=== Fauna ===
The mammals in the wetland are the Indian civet, mongoose, Indian porcupine, squirrel and common Indian Hare.

== Problems in the wetland ==
In the Wetland, the ecological status of the Kanjli lake, in particular, has been threatened on account of the following issues.

- Extensive growth of water hyacinth due to nutrients and pesticides from adjoining agricultural fields
- Anthropogenic pressure and consequent land encroachment
- Eutrophication, particularly due to in-situ decay of hyacinth
- Conversion of wetland for agriculture, human habitation, industrial expansion, and recreational activities
- Illegal and indiscriminate fishing causing disturbance to birdlife

== Conservation measures ==
The conservation and management measures undertaken with assistance provided by the Ministry of Environment & Forests, Govt. of India (MoEF, GOI) by the Environment Division of the Punjab State Council for Science & Technology under the directive of the State Level Steering Committee are the following.

- Detailed mapping of the wetland for declaring and notifying the Kanjli Wetland as protected area under the Environment Protection Act, 1986.
- Judicious hyacinth (weed) control by the irrigation department, district police, and even army units, by manual methods. Conveyor belt system as a mechanical method to clear the weeds is also being tried.
- Hyacinth control through biological control by releasing two weevil species (which have proved been found effective worldwide and introduced in the downstream in the Harike Wetland Ecosystem) of Neochetina bruchi and N. eichorniae. Release of the moth Sameodes albiguittal is also being considered as an option.
- Introduction of more fish species in the lake judiciously to avoid any adverse effects of exotic species.
- Afforestation measures around the lake area and in the small islands, with mixed indigenous species of trees to prevent soil erosion resulting in siltation reduction in the lake, to attract large species of birds to nest and roost and to enhance the ecosystem.
- Selective Fencing of the Wetland to prevent excessive grazing to preservation of important pockets provide habitat for wading birds and to check encroachments
- Monitoring of water quality continuously to check the degree of external nutrient loading of the lake waters and to evolve appropriate preventive and curative steps
- Public awareness campaigns through mass-media, educational material, camps, etc. of the wetland ecosystem with the help of Voluntary Organizations
- Continued scientific research on Biological and hydrological components, and Productivity potential with respect of economic value, social aspects of heritage and to rate the significance of the wetland.

== Sikh tradition ==
Sikh tradition states that at the age of thirty, Nanak went missing and was presumed to have drowned after going for one of his morning baths to a local stream called the Kali Bein. Three days later he reappeared and would give the same answer to any question posed to him: "There is no Hindu, there is no Muslim" (in Punjabi, "nā kōi hindū nā kōi musalmān"). It was from this moment that Nanak would begin to spread the teachings of what was then the beginning of Sikhism.

== Gallery ==
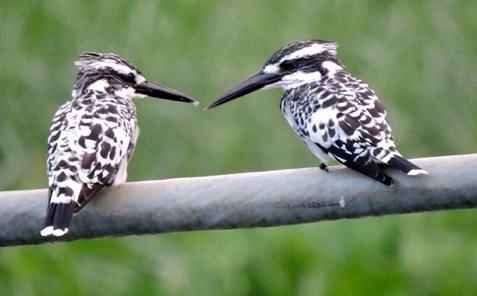
Pied kingfisher, Kanjli wetland, Punjab, India

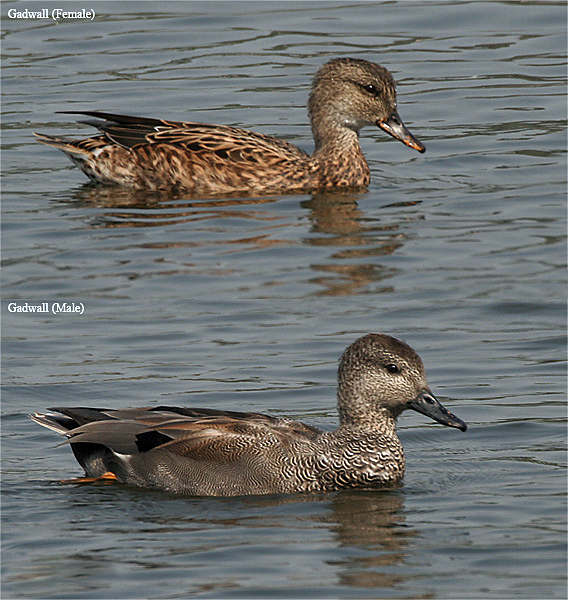
Wigeon

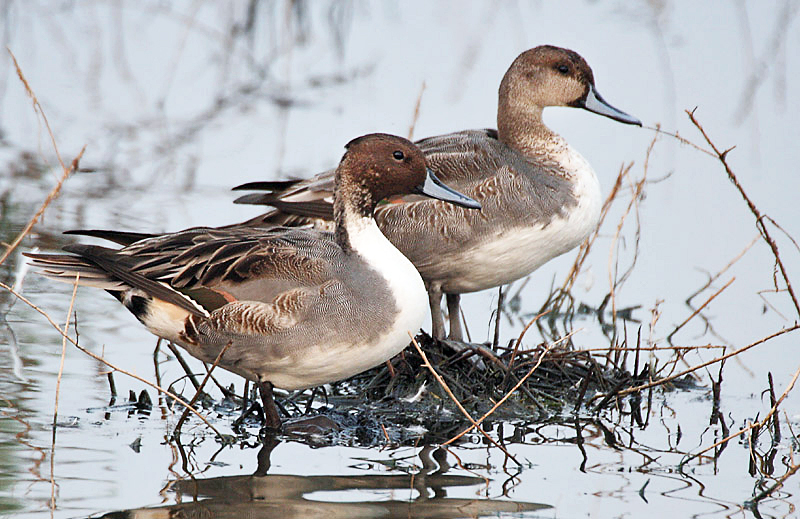
Northern pintail (Anas acuta)

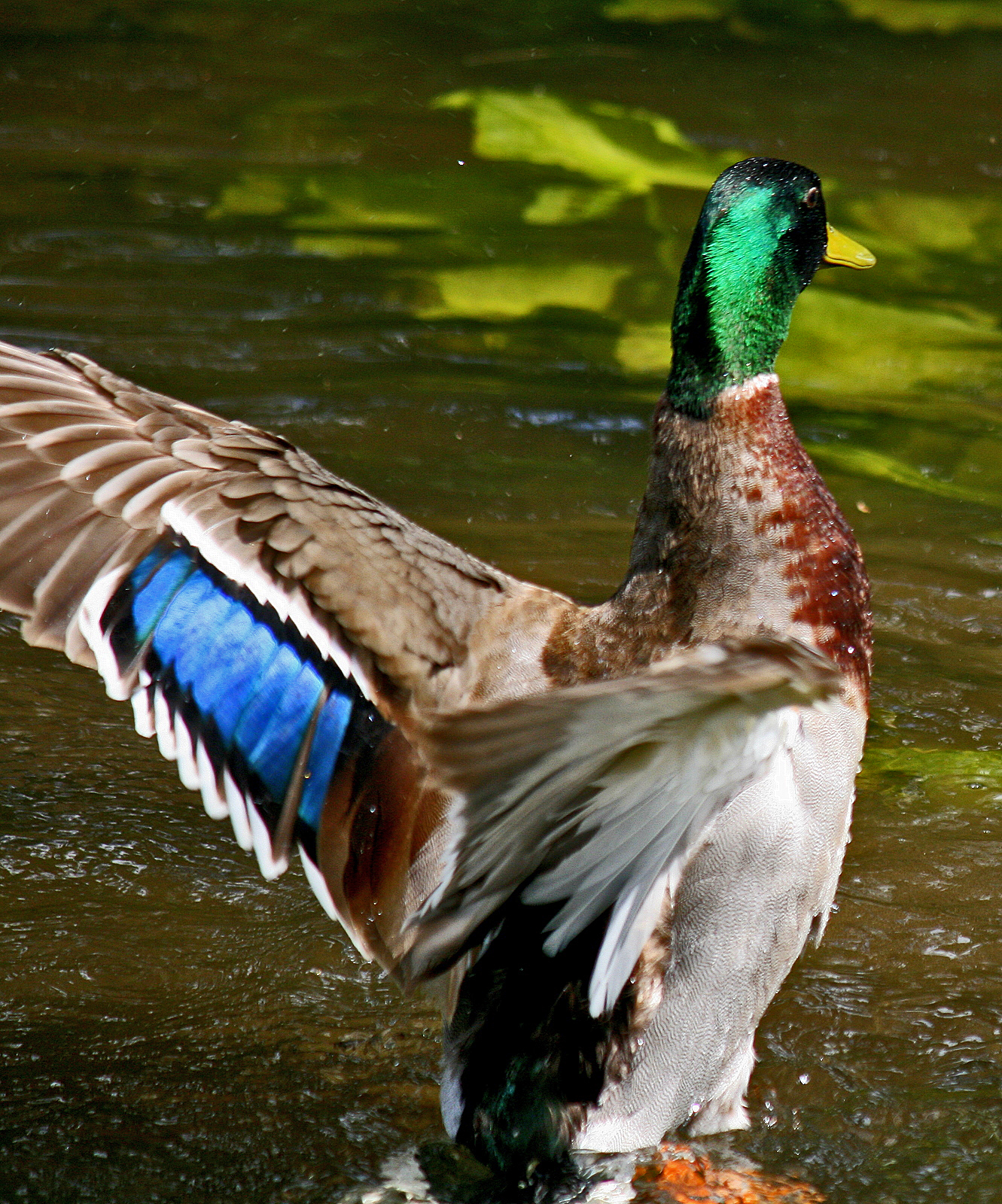
Speculum feathers of a male mallard

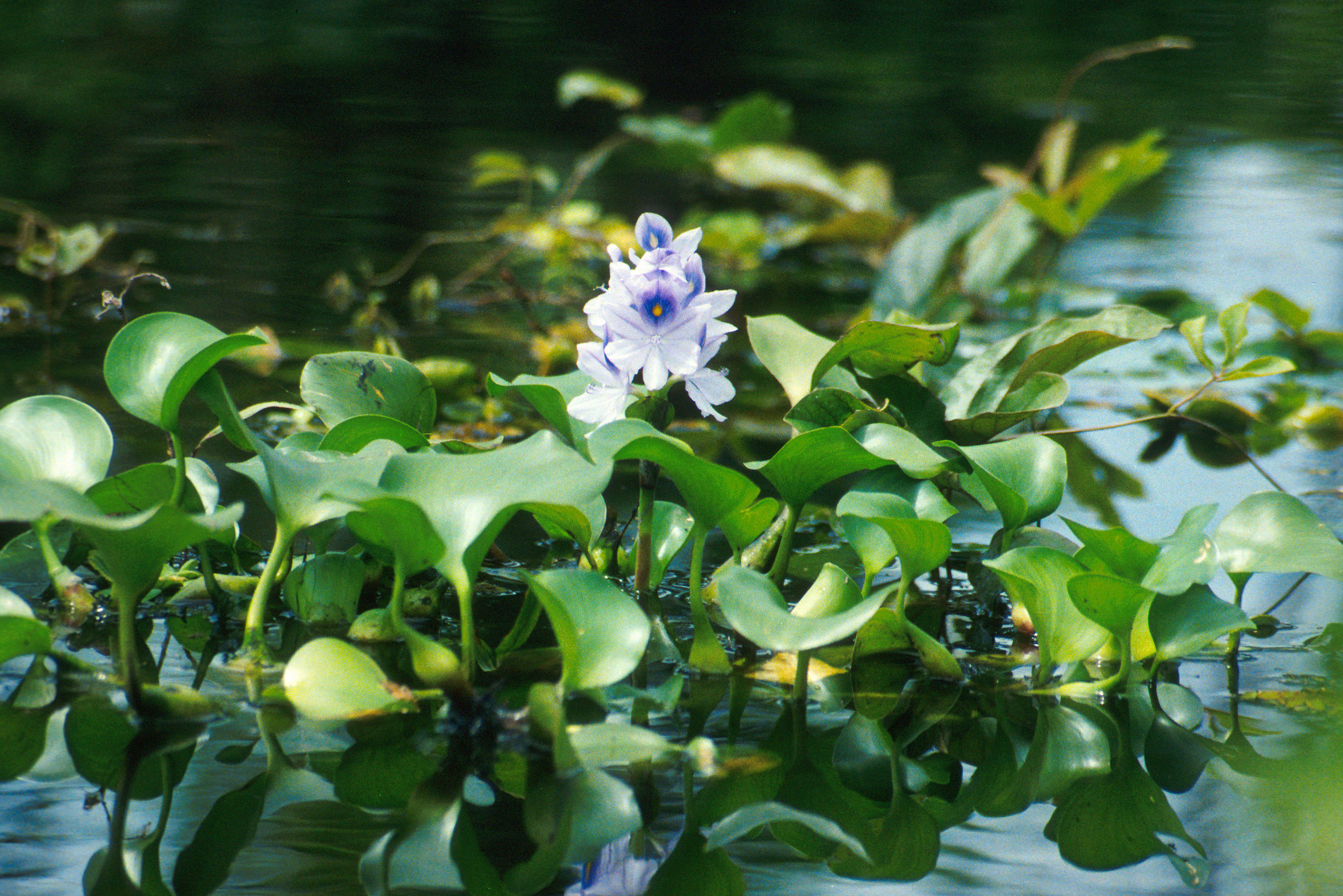
Common hyacinth in flower

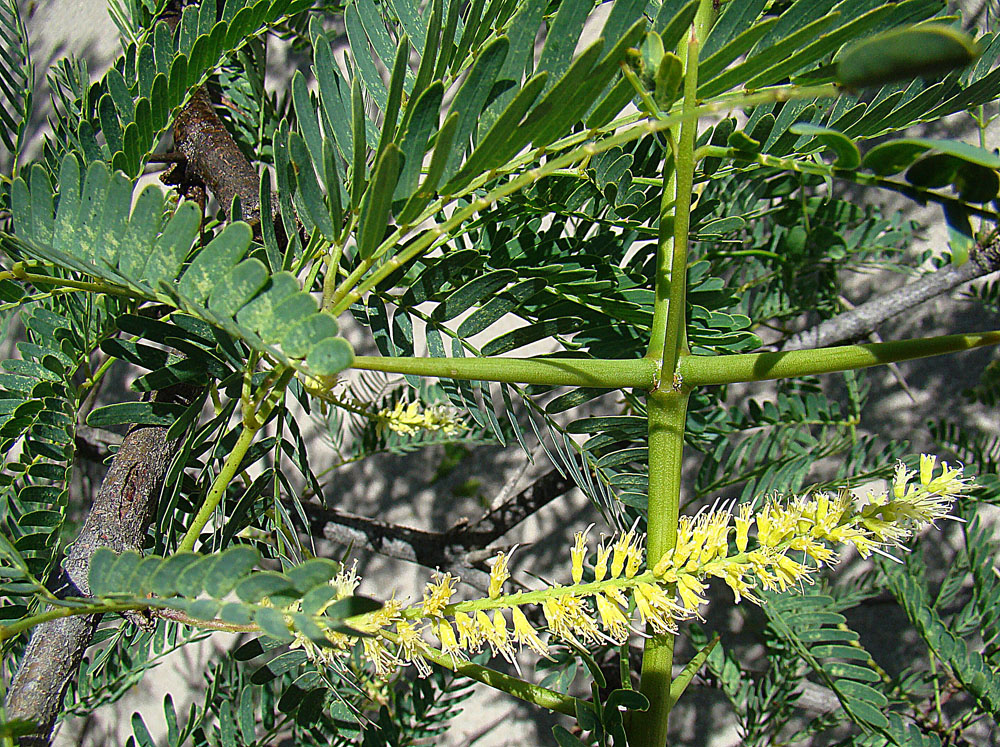
Prosopis juliflora

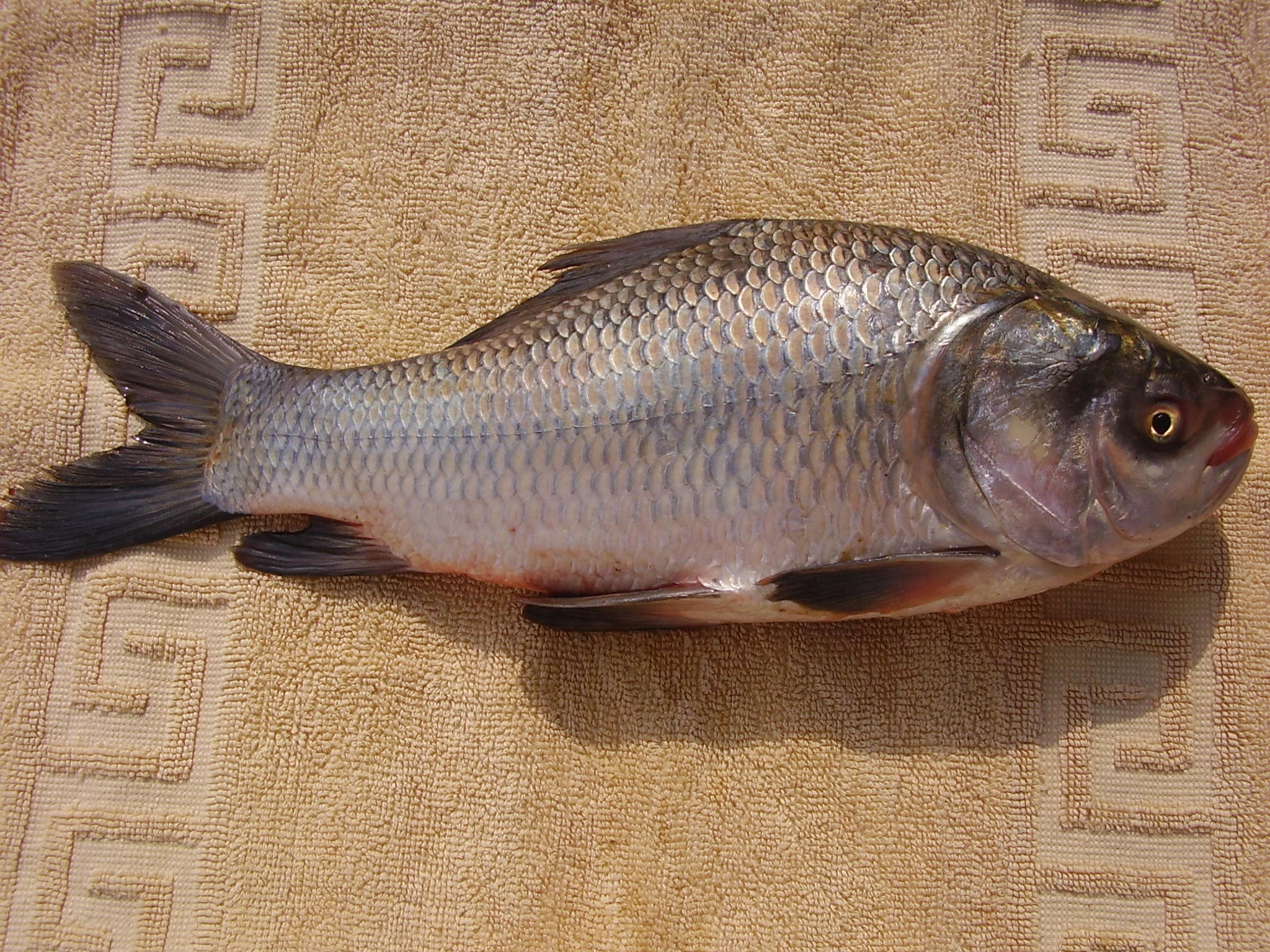
Catla

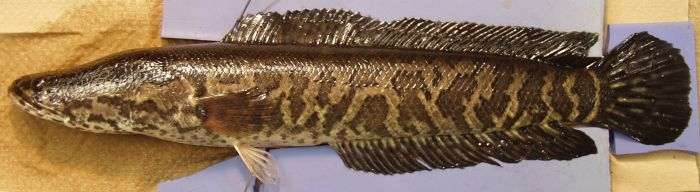
Channa marulius (northern snakehead)

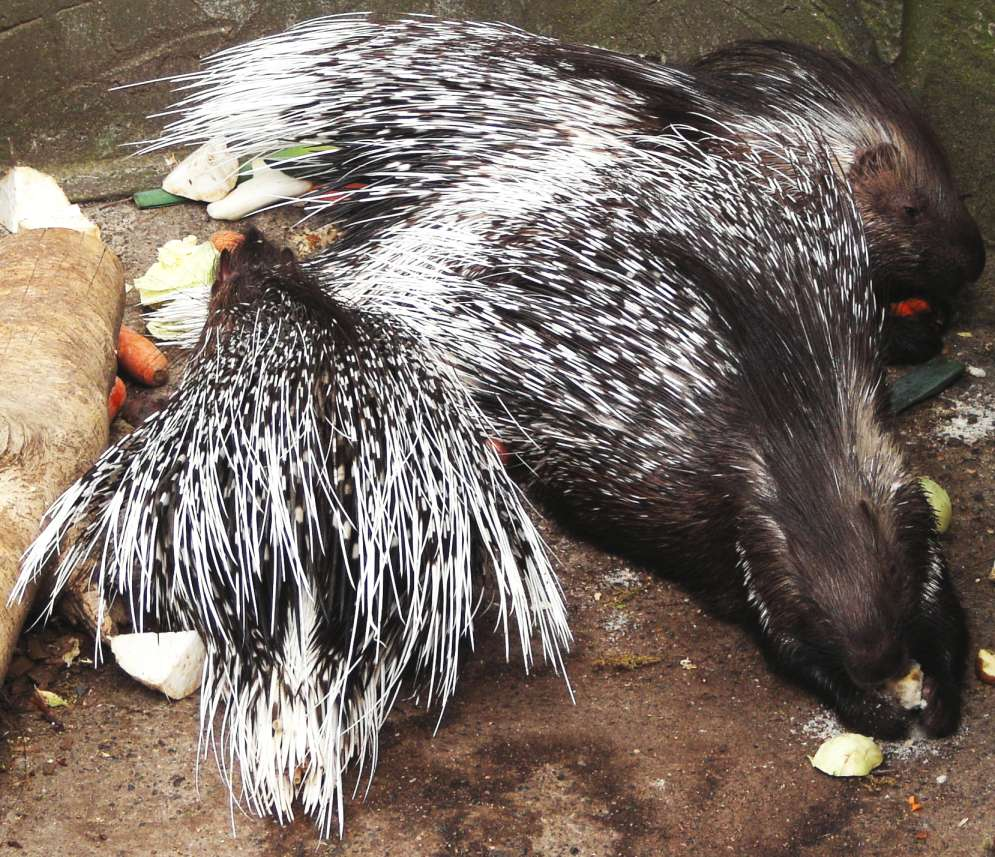
Indian porcupine
