= Nicholson Cemetery, Delhi =

Cemetery in Delhi, India

Nicholson Cemetery
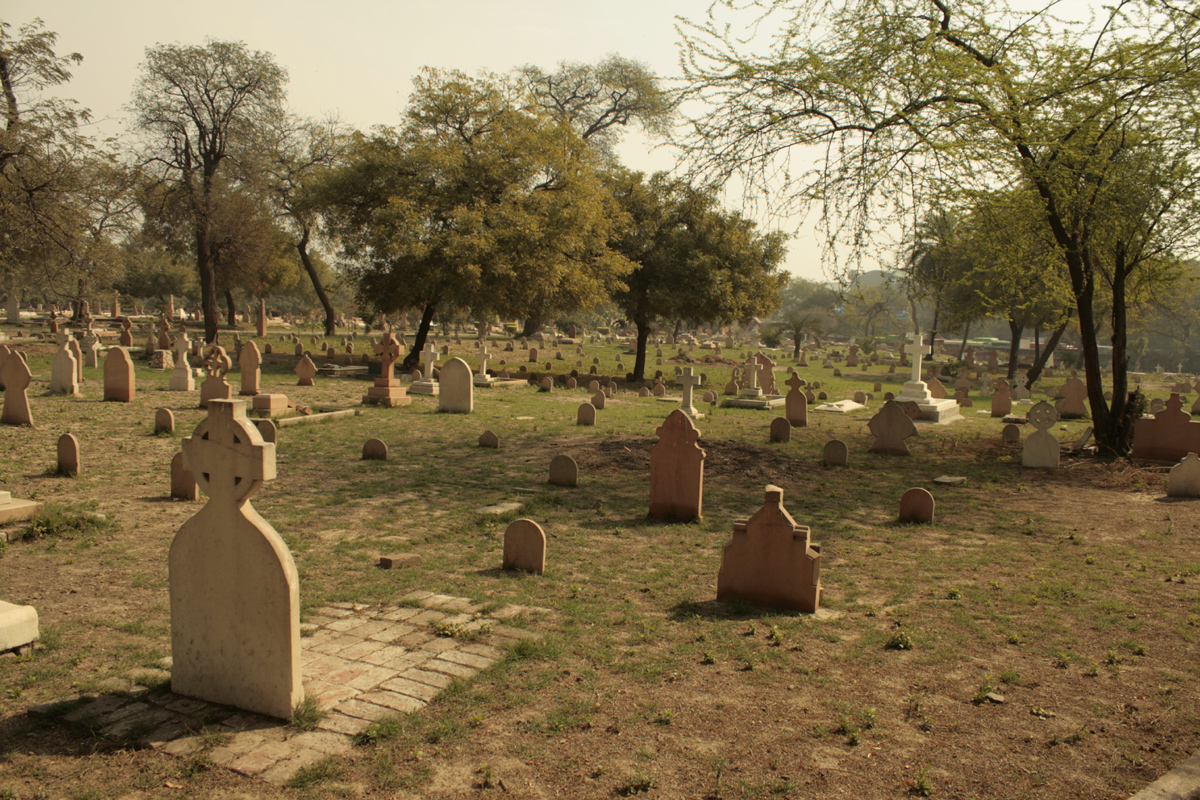
- Nicholson Cemetery
- Interactive map of Nicholson Cemetery

Details
- Established: 1857
- Location: Delhi
- Country: India
- Coordinates: 28.66919°N 77.22519°E
- Type: Christian
- Owned by: St. James Church

Nicholson Cemetery, formerly known as the Old Delhi Military Cemetery and the Kashmere Gate Cemetery, is a Christian cemetery located in Kashmere Gate, Delhi, India inside the Civil lines area just outside Old Delhi. It is located near the Kashmere Gate Metro Station and west of the Inter State Bus Terminal. It is the site of the earliest known Christian burials in Delhi NCR. The cemetery was established in 1857 and is named after Brigadier-General John Nicholson, a Victorian era military officer who played a pivotal role during the Indian Rebellion of 1857. The St. James' Church, who owns the cemetery, is the oldest place of worship for the Christian community of Delhi. The church, along with the cemetery and the Victorian-era buildings and houses built during the 1800s in the Kashmere Gate neighbourhood, was once considered to be a "centripetal" part of Christians in Delhi.

According to the Indian Paranormal Society the headless apparition of John Nicholson haunts the place. There are also other speculations that the ghosts of Europeans haunt the place.

== History ==
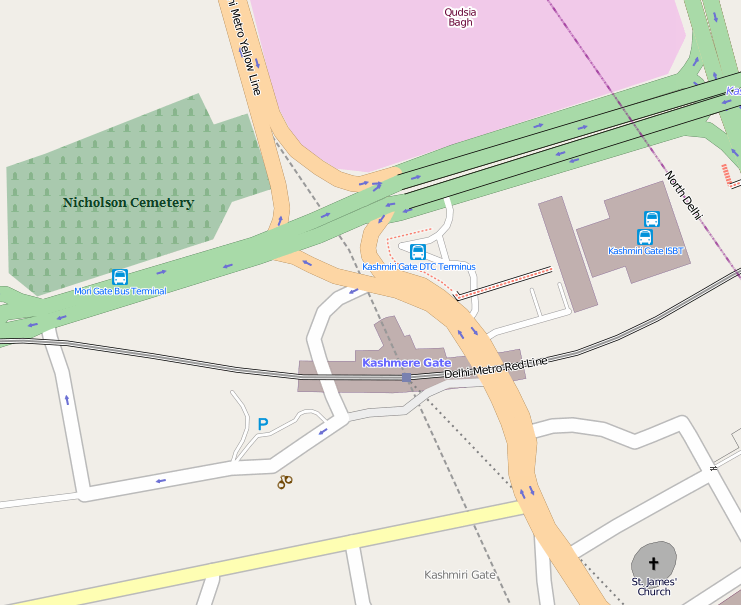
Location of Nicholson Cemetery in Kashmere Gate, St. James Church is shown at right bottom corner.

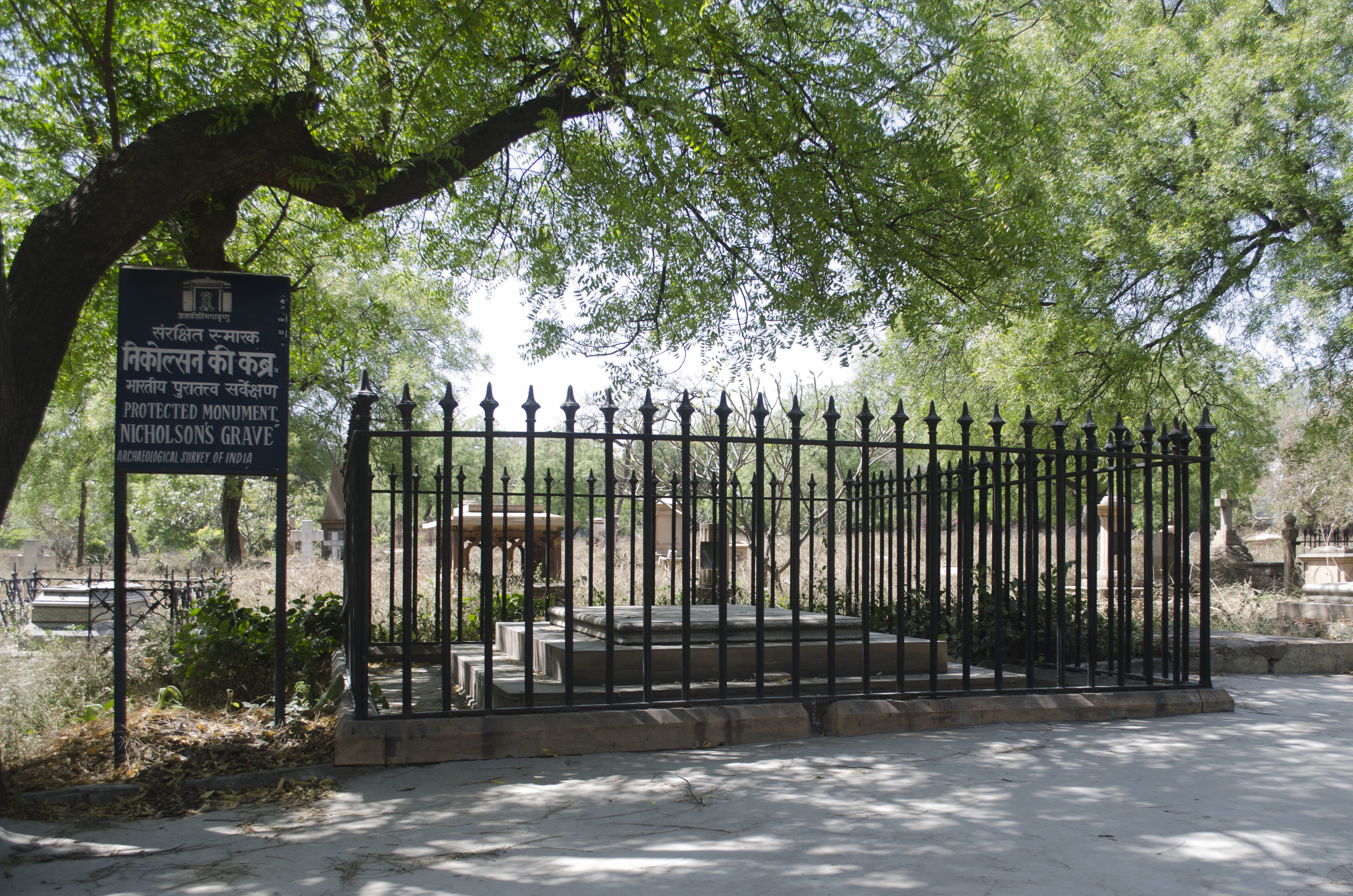
Grave of John Nicholson

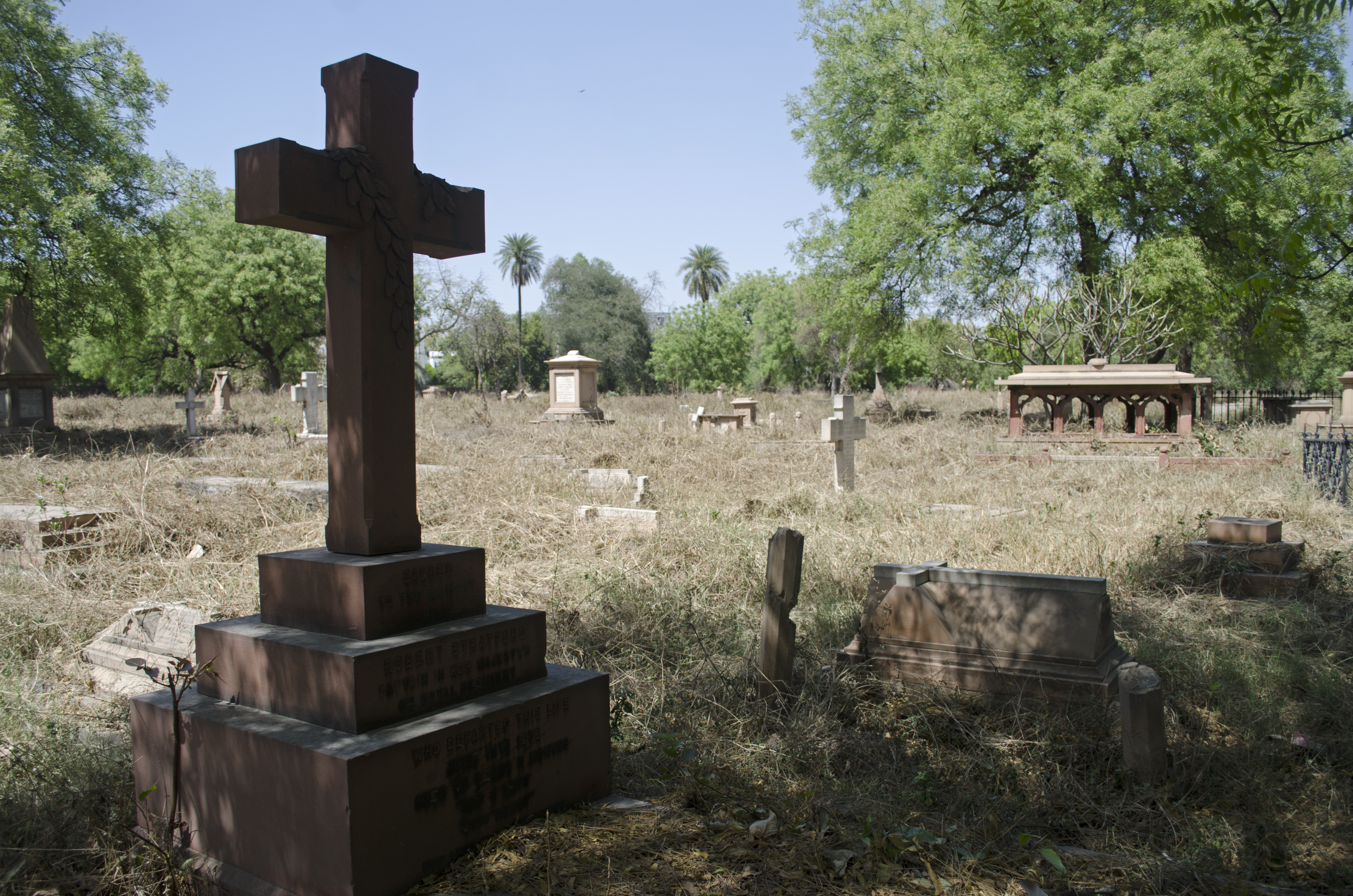
Scattered graves at Nicholson Cemetery

Nicholson Cemetery is located near the Kashmere Gate area near metro station and west of Inter State Bus Terminal. Established in 1857, Nicholson Cemetery is the oldest Christian cemetery in Delhi NCR. It was known as the Old Delhi Military Cemetery or Kashmere Gate Cemetery (because of being just outside of Old Delhi) until the early 1900s, when it was named after John Nicholson, a brigadier-general in the British Army.

John Nicholson was born on 11 December 1822 in Dublin, Ireland. His father, Alexander Nicholson, was a physician. The Nicholson family moved to Lisburn, after the demise of Alexander in 1830. Nicholson was afterwards sent to the college at Dungannon. His maternal uncle, Sir James Weir Hogg, obtained a cadetship for him in the Bengal Infantry. He joined for duty at Banaras, and was attached to the 41st native infantry. In December 1839, he was posted to the 27th native infantry at Firozpur. He served in the First Anglo-Afghan War (1839–1842) and First Anglo-Sikh War (1845-1846), but he was best known for his pivotal role in the Indian Mutiny of 1857 especially during the Siege of Delhi.

The Indian Rebellion of 1857 began as a mutiny of sepoys of the East India Company's army on 10 May 1857, in the town of Meerut, and soon escalated into other mutinies and civilian rebellions largely in the upper Gangetic plain and central India, with the major hostilities confined to present-day Uttar Pradesh, Bihar, northern Madhya Pradesh, and the Delhi region. Nicholson was deputy-commissioner at Peshawar during that time. He played an instrumental role during the Siege of Delhi, one of the decisive conflicts of the rebellion. The assault of Delhi took place on 14 September 1857, and Nicholson was selected to command the main storming party. He was shot in chest by a sepoy of rebellions. He was carried to a hospital tent, but after lingering a few days he died of his wounds on 23 September.

The number of casualties resulted from the Siege of Delhi created the rising demand for a Christian cemetery in the area. A new burial-ground was opened in front of the Kashmere Gate, near to Ludlow Castle. Nicholson was among the first people who were buried there. A white marble slab from the Red Fort was taken to build his tombstone and epitaph on it reads:

The grave of Brigadier General John Nicholson who led the assault of Delhi but fell in the hour of victory mortally wounded and died 23rd September 1857 aged 35

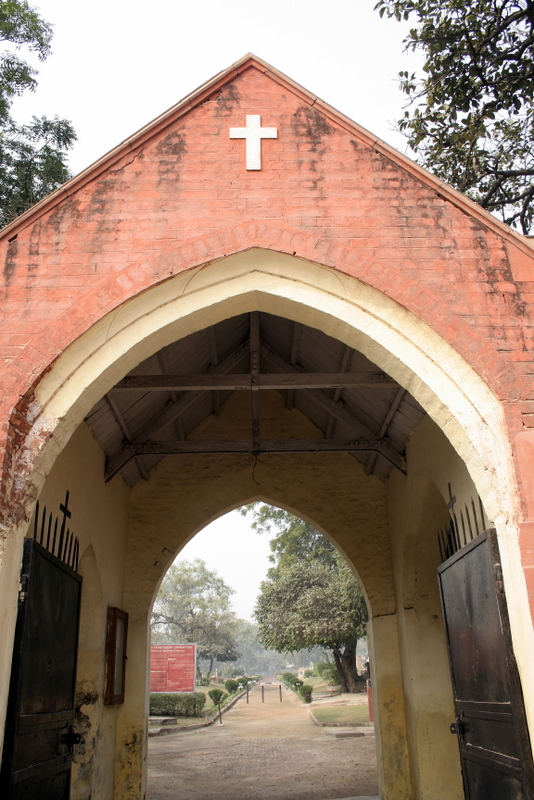
Entrance to Nicholson Cemetery

== Renovation ==
The British High Commission in India renovated the cemetery in 2006. It hired British multinational security services company G4S (formerly Group 4 Securicor) to provide security.

== Notable graves ==
- Camille Bulcke
- Everard Lisle-Phillipps
- John Nicholson
- John Purcell
- Philip Salkeld
- Anil Wilson
- Eugenie Grosup

== See also ==
- Delhi War Cemetery
- Lothian Cemetery
- Victory Tunnel

== Bibliography ==
- Bose, Sugata; Jalal, Ayesha (2003), Modern South Asia: History, Culture, Political Economy (2nd ed.), London: Routledge, p. 253, ISBN 0-415-30787-2
- Metcalf, Barbara D.; Metcalf, Thomas R. (2006), A Concise History of Modern India (2nd ed.), Cambridge University Press, p. 337, ISBN 0-521-68225-8
- Bandyopadhyay, Sekhara (2004), From Plassey to Partition: A History of Modern India, New Delhi: Orient Longman, p. 523, ISBN 81-250-2596-0
- Brown, Judith M. (1994), Modern India: The Origins of an Asian Democracy (2nd ed.), Oxford University Press, p. 480, ISBN 0-19-873113-2
