= Everard Aloysius Lisle Phillipps =

Recipient of the Victoria Cross

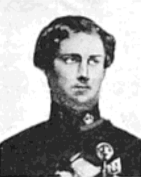
- Born: 28 May 1835; Coleorton, Leicestershire
- Died: 17 September 1857 (aged 22); Delhi, British India
- Burial place: Old Delhi Military Cemetery
- Military career
- Allegiance: United Kingdom
- Branch: Bengal Army
- Rank: Ensign
- Units: 11th Bengal Native Infantry; 60th Rifles
- Conflicts: Indian Mutiny
- Awards: Victoria Cross

Everard Aloysius Lisle Phillipps VC (28 May 1835 – 17 September 1857) was an English recipient of the Victoria Cross, the highest and most prestigious award for gallantry in the face of the enemy that can be awarded to British and Commonwealth forces.

== Details ==
After attending St Edmund's College, Ware, in 1854 Everard Phillipps sailed for India to join the 11th Bengal Native Infantry. When the Indian Mutiny broke out in 1857, Phillipps' regiment was amongst the first to revolt. When the Queen's proclamation against the insurgents came, he had to read it out as he could speak the native tongue. Riding boldly forward while the bullets whistled round him, he began to read the proclamation, but before he got to the end of the first sentence his horse was shot from under him, and he fell to the ground, himself wounded by a stray bullet. Undeterred, he sprang to his feet and read through the whole proclamation from beginning to end before taking cover.

On the desertion of the Bengal Infantry, he then joined the 60th Rifles. He performed many gallant deeds, and in the months before his death he was wounded three times. At the Siege of Delhi, he captured the Water Bastion with a small party and was killed in the streets on 17 September 1857. His death was recorded in The London Gazette on 18 September.

Ensign Phillipps was awarded the Victoria Cross fifty years after his death. His citation reads:

London Gazette, 21st October, 1859. "Ensign Everard Aloysius Lisle Phillipps, of the 11th Regiment of Bengal Native Infantry, would have been recommended to Her Majesty for the decoration of the Victoria Cross, had he survived, for many gallant deeds which he performed during the Siege of Delhi, during which he was wounded three times. At the assault of that city he captured the Water Bastion with a small party of men, and was finally killed in the streets of Delhi on the 18th of September."

His VC is on display in the Lord Ashcroft Gallery at the Imperial War Museum, London.
