= Paramjit Singh (ruler) =

Maharaja of Kapurthala (1949 –1955)

- Maharaja
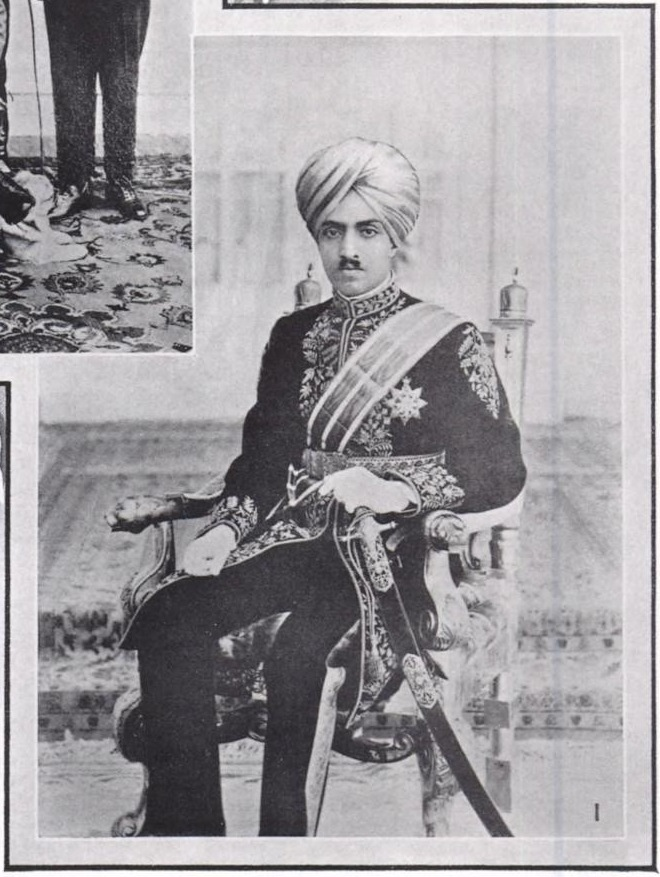
- Photograph of Paramjit Singh that was published in 'Indian States, A Biographical, Historical, and Administrative Survey' (1922)

Maharaja of Kapurthala
- Reign: 19 June 1949 – 19 July 1955
- Predecessor: Jagatjit Singh
- Successor: Sukhjit Singh
- Born: 19 May 1892
- Died: 19 July 1955 (aged 63)
- Wives: Brinda Devi; Lilawati Devi; Stella Mudge
- Issue: Indira Devi; Sushila Devi; Ourmilla Devi; Aas Kaur; Sukhjit Singh
- House: Kapurthala
- Dynasty: Ahluwalia
- Father: Jagatjit Singh
- Mother: Harbans Kaur
- Religion: Sikhism
- Education: Cheam School; Harrow School; Lycée Janson-de-Sailly; St Paul's School

Paramjit Singh (19 May 1892 – 19 July 1955) was the Maharaja of Kapurthala from 19 June 1949 until his death in 1955. He was the heir-apparent to his father, Jagatjit Singh, the Maharaja of Kapurthala, from his birth in 1892 until 19 June 1949.

== Early life ==
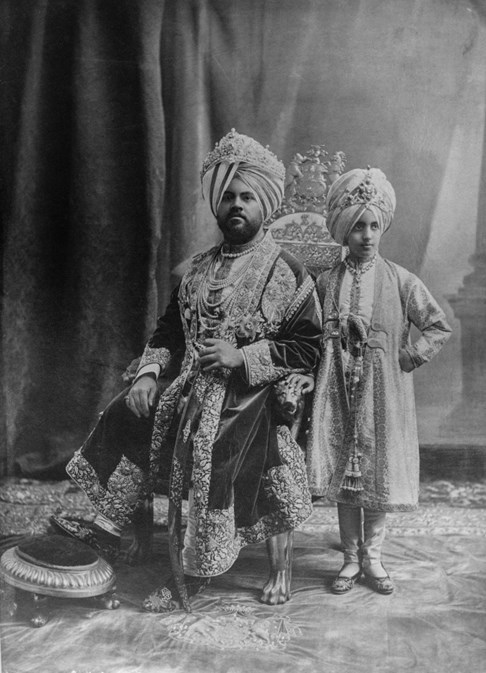
Photograph of Maharaja Jagatjit Singh of Kapurthala with his son, Kunwar Paramjit Singh, ca.1900.

He was born on 19 May 1892 to Jagatjit Singh and his wife Harbans Kaur. His birth was celebrated in Kapurthala with great festivities and rejoicings. For his elementary education, he was first placed under the tuition of English and French governesses and tutors in Kapurthala, following which he went to Europe in 1905 to complete his education. There he first attended Cheam School in Surrey, then Harrow School in Harrow for a year, and then Lycée Janson de Sailly in Paris for two years, and then St. Paul's School in London. Upon his return to Kapurthala in 1909, he received thorough training in both the executive and judicial departments of the state to better understand the management of state affairs. He married firstly to Brinda Devi, a daughter of Kanwar Gambhir Chand of Jubbal, in 1911. Their wedding was celebrated with great zeal and was attended by a large number of guests from across the world, including Aga Khan III, Antoine d'Orléans, Amédée de Broglie and his wife, and rulers of Jammu and Kashmir, Jhalawar, Poonch, Kangra (Lambragaon), Nurpur and Jaswan. To mark this occasion, his father made primary education free in the state and abolished the begar. He attended the Delhi Durbar of 1911. He married secondly in 1932 to Lilawati Devi, from Kangra, and thirdly to Stella Mudge, on 3 July 1937. By his first wife, he had three daughters: Indira Devi, Sushila Devi, and Ourmilla Devi. By his second wife, he had a daughter, Ash Kaur, and a son, Sukhjit Singh.

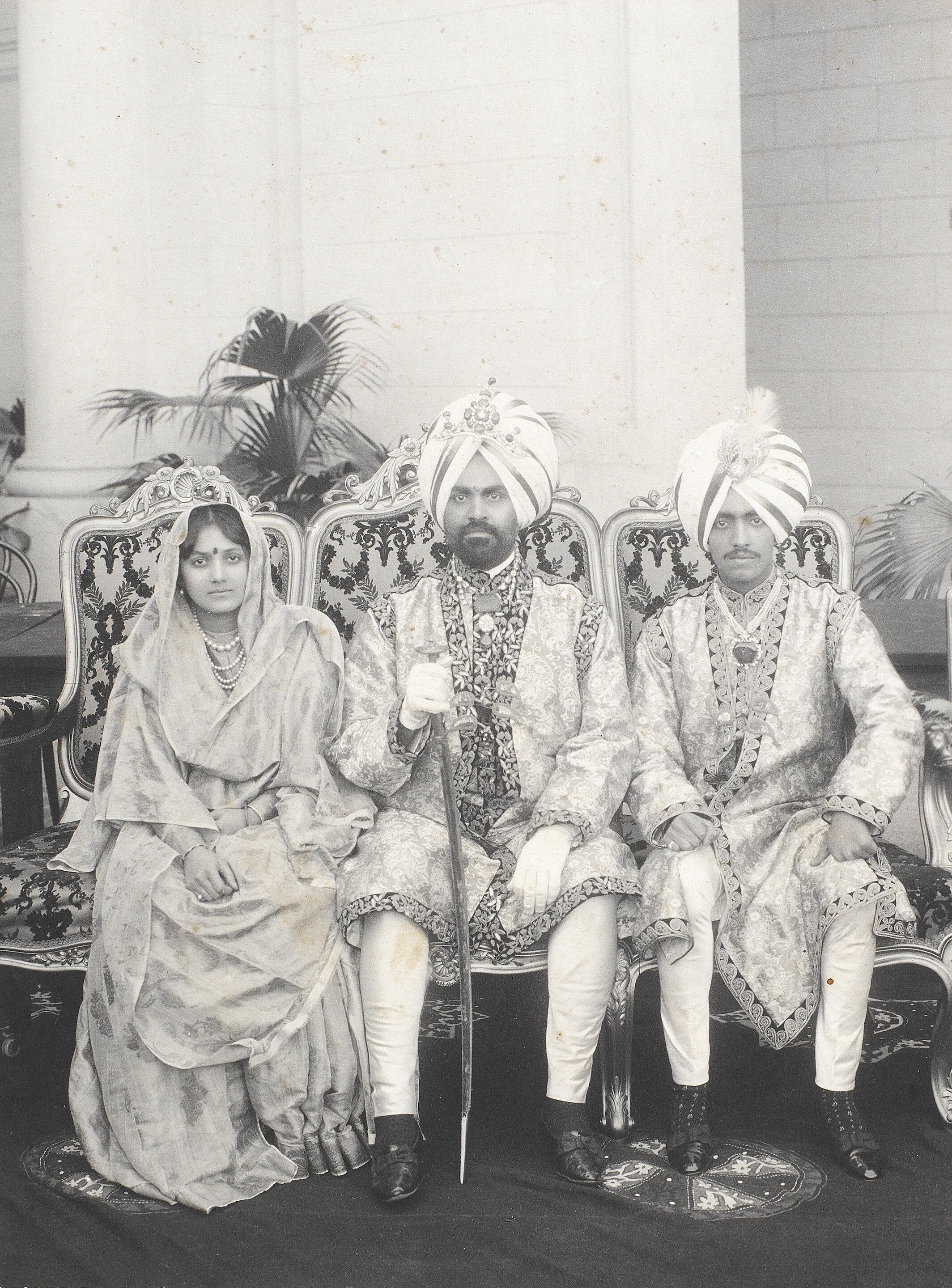
Photograph of Maharaja Jagatjit Singh of Kapurthala with his son Kunwar Paramjit Singh and daughter-in-law Maharani Brinda Devi Sahiba of Jubbal, ca.1911

During the absence of his father from Kapurthala, firstly in 1915, secondly in 1919, and thirdly in 1922, he conducted the administration of state affairs in his stead. Again, in 1930, when his father was away from the state, he acted as President of the State Council of Administration from April to November 1930. He served as President of the Executive Council of state, Household Minister and Commandant of the forces of state. In 1935, when the Chief Minister of state, Sir Abdul Hamid, retired, he took charge of state administration for a few months. He attended the silver jubilee of George V in 1935, and the coronation of George VI and Elizabeth in 1937.

== Succession ==
Upon the death of his father on 19 June 1949, he succeeded him on the throne of Kapurthala. In 1950, while he was in England, he held a reception at the Dorchester Hotel in London and there conferred the Nishan-i-Iftikhar on Sardar Karam Singh.

== Personal interests ==
=== Traveling ===
He had travelled all over India, Europe and the United States. In 1928, he accompanied his father to Madrid and there stayed with Alfonso XIII as his guest. In 1930, he visited Belgium with his father and was hosted by Albert I at Château de Laeken. In 1936, he was invited to Romania by Carol II, and he accepted the invitation and stayed for two weeks at Sinaia.

== Death ==
He died at Mussoorie on 19 July 1955 and was succeeded by his son Sukhjit Singh. His body was taken to Kapurthala on 21 July 1955 and was cremated on the same evening.

== Titles, styles, and honours ==
=== Titles and styles ===
Paramjit was originally styled as Sri Tikka Raja Paramjit Singh of Kapurthala. Upon his accession to the throne, his styles and titles became His Highness Farzand-i-Dilband Rasikh-al-Iqtidad-i-Daulat-i-Inglishia Raja-i-Rajagan Maharaja Paramjit Singh Bahadur, the Maharaja of Kapurthala.

=== Orders and decorations ===
Country	Year	Order	Grade/Class	Ribbon	Reference
United Kingdom	1911	Delhi Durbar Medal	Gold		
United Kingdom	1935	King George V Silver Jubilee Medal			
United Kingdom	1937	King George VI Coronation Medal			
France	unknown	Legion of Honour	Grand officier		
Romania	unknown	Order of the Star of Romania	Grand Cross		
Spain	unknown	Order of Civil Merit	Grand Cross		
Tunisia	unknown	Order of Glory	unknown		
