= Anita Delgado =

- Rani of Kapurthala
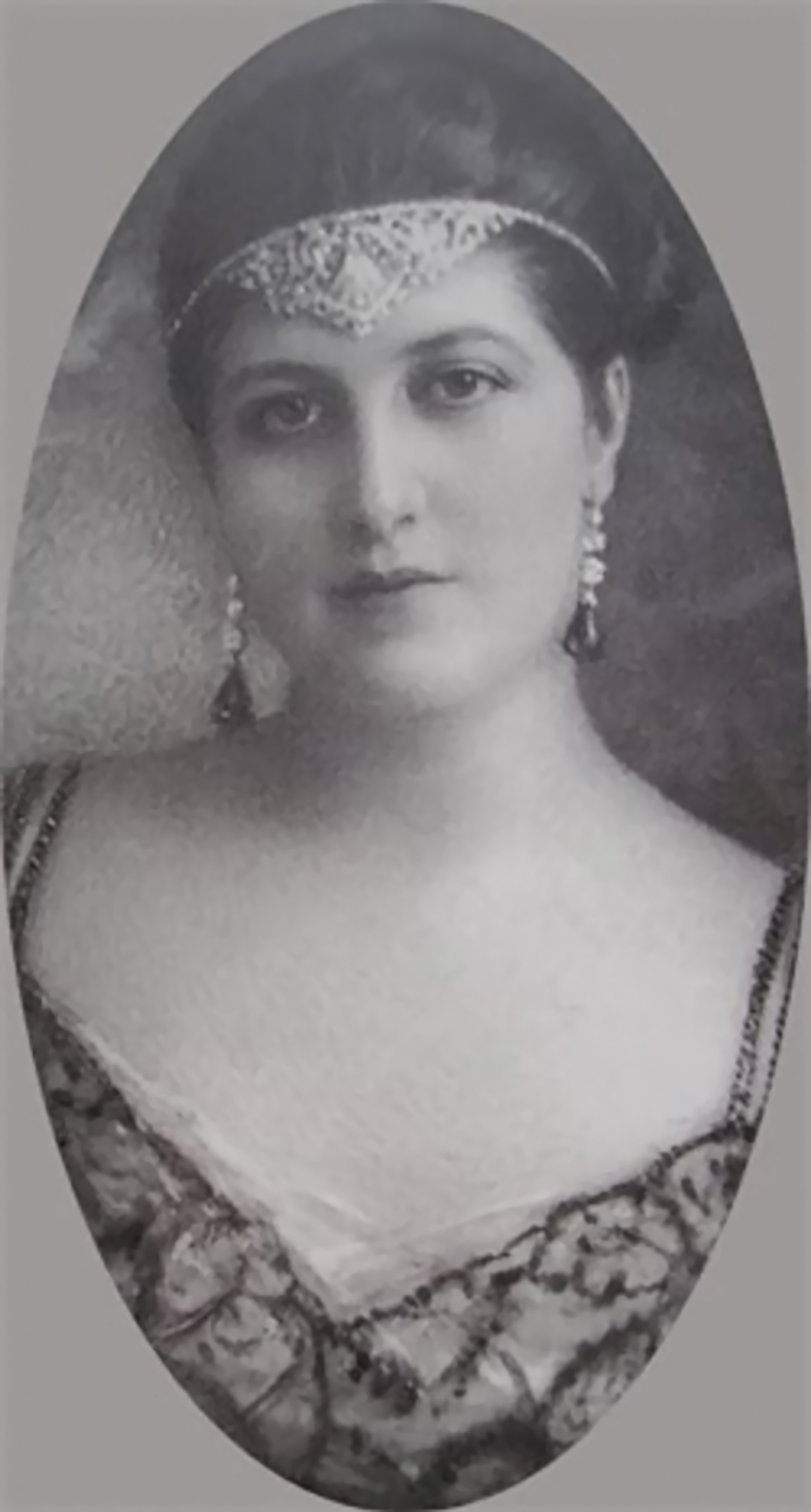
- Born: Anita María Delgado Briones; 8 February 1890; Málaga, Spain
- Died: 7 July 1962 (aged 72); Madrid, Spain
- Burial: Cementerio de San Justo
- Husband: Jagatjit Singh (m. 1908; died 1949)
- Issue: Ajit Singh Sahib Bahadur
- Father: Ángel Delgado de los Cobos
- Mother: Candelaria Briones
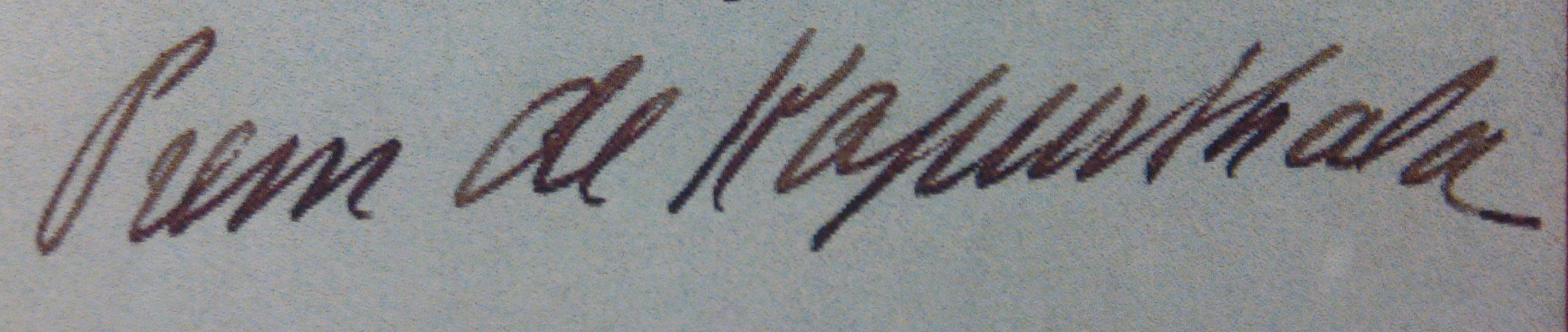
- Signature

Anita Delgado Briones (1890–1962) was a Spanish flamenco dancer and singer from Spain who achieved fame for having married the Indian Maharaja of Kapurthala, thus becoming a Rani of Kapurthala.

== Biography ==
She was born on 8 February 1890 in Málaga. The family emigrated to Madrid, where her beauty and that of her sister, Victoria, were welcomed. Painters Julio Romero de Torres and Ricardo Baroja asked that they model, but Anita refused being only 16.

=== Marriage ===
During the marriage ceremony of king Alfonso XIII of Spain in Madrid, Sir Jagatjit Singh Sahib Bahadur, the Maharaja of the princely state of Kapurthala watched her performances in a cafe-concert. He seduced her and stayed with her throughout the wedding but left after the bombing of the royal couple (31 May 1906) in an assassination attempt on Alfonso. Later, however, her friends Romero de Torres, Ramón María del Valle-Inclán and Pastora Imperio convinced her to further meet him in Paris. He had her educated (including in French) in order that he could explain his love for her. They married on 28 January 1908. After a Sikh marriage in India, she changed her name to Rani Prem Kaur Sahiba.

They later travelled in Europe and India, and she wrote a book about this time called "Impresiones de mis viajes a las Indias". She also gave birth to the Maharaja's son. During the First World War, her husband worked in Franco-British hospitals. They separated after the Maharaja married his sixth wife and as a result, Delgado stayed in Paris living secretly with her secretary in order that her allowance continued.

The pair divorced in 1924.

=== Jewels ===
SS Persia, a ship carrying her jewels to France, sank en route on 30 December 1915. The jewels are said to be worth millions.

=== Death ===
Delgado died in 1962.

== Popular culture ==
A movie on Anita's life titled La princesa de Kapurthala starring the Spanish actress Penélope Cruz was slated to begin shooting in 2006. However a descendant of Jagatjit Singh, Shatrujit Singh, has opposed the filming since he considers that Javier Moro's novel on which it is based distorts truth, especially the allegations of the Maharajah forcing Anita to have an abortion.

== Son: Ajit Singh ==
Delgado and the Maharaja had one child, the Maharajkumar Ajit Singh Sahib Bahadur. Singh was born on 26 April 1908. He was educated at Cambridge University and at the Military Academy, Dehradun. He became an assistant to the Indian Trade Commissioner in Argentina. Singh died in 1982.

== Gallery ==
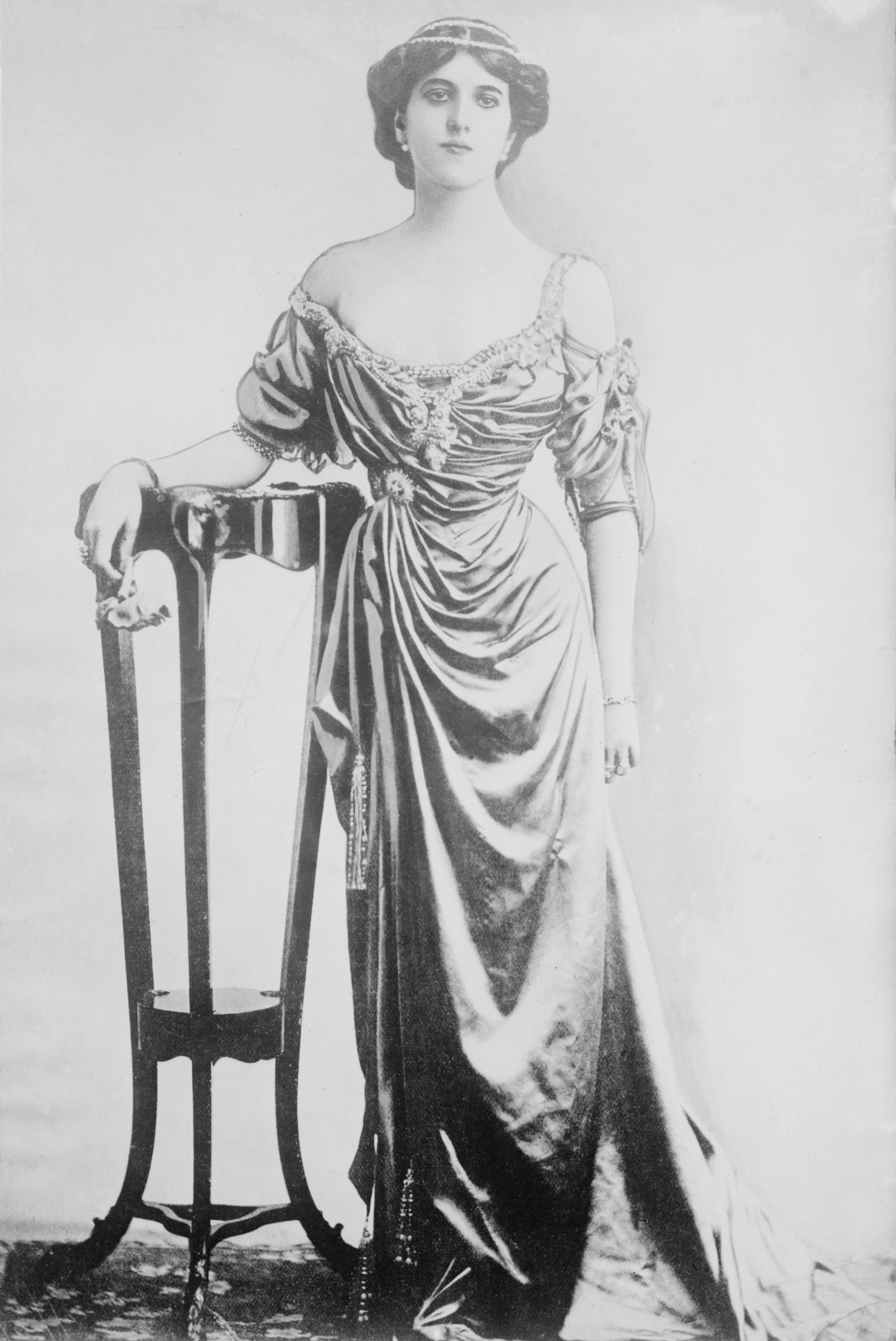
Anita Delgado, c. 1910 – c. 1915.

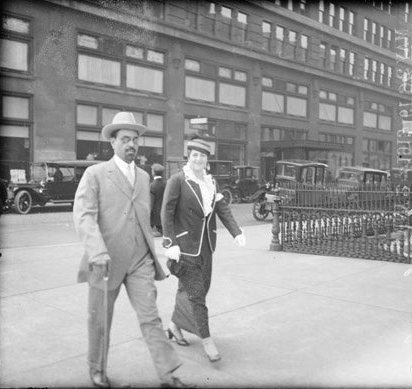
The Maharaja of Kapurthala and his wife in Chicago, 1915

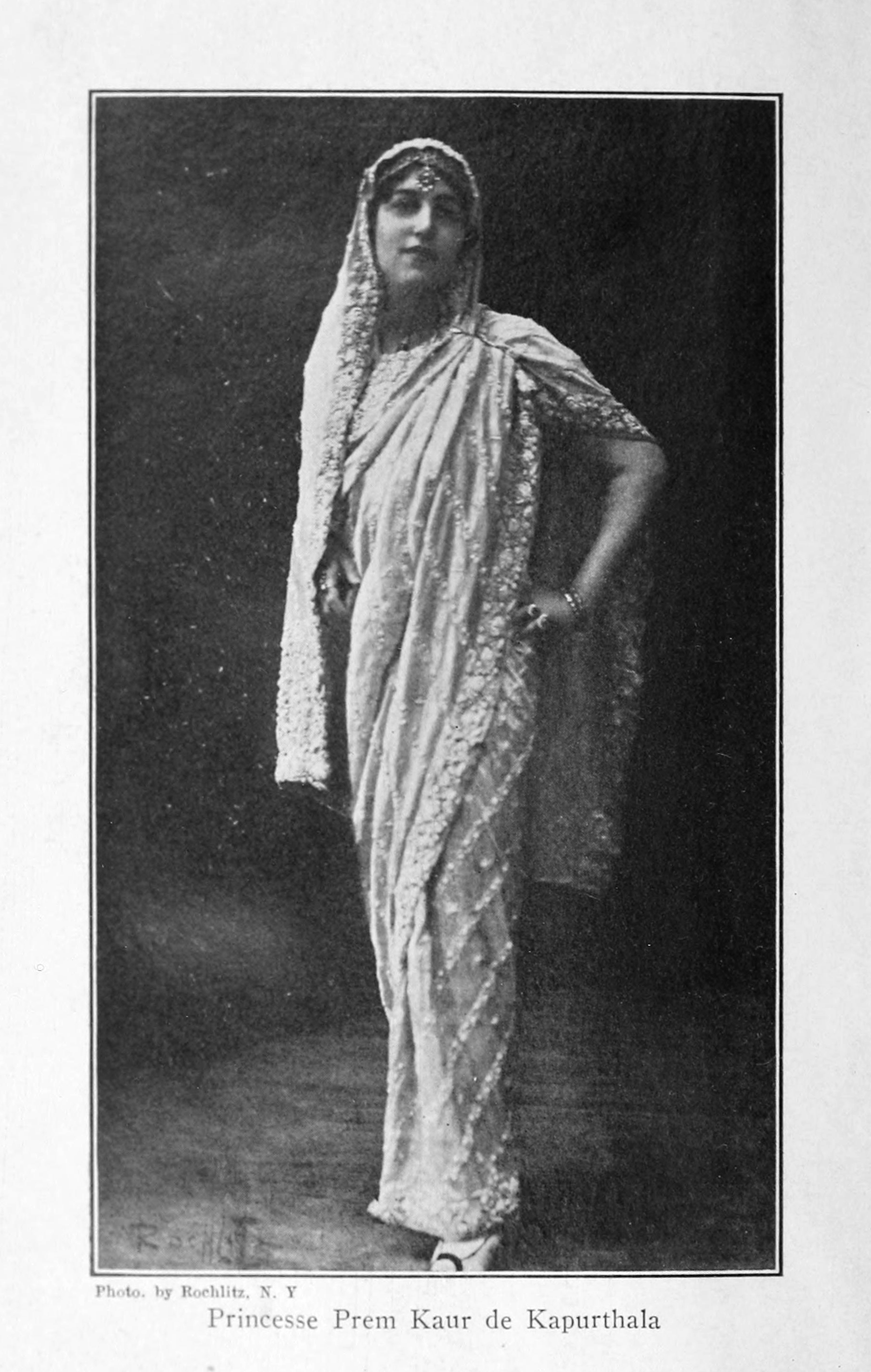
Delgado in 1915

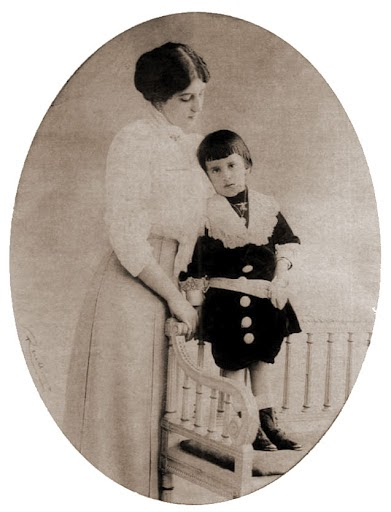
Delgado with her son, Ajit Singh

== Bibliography ==
- Elisa Vázquez de Gey. Anita Delgado. Maharani of Kapurthala. (1998) Editorial Planeta ISBN 84-226-8607-4
- Elisa Vázquez de Gey. The Maharanis' Dream. (2005) Editorial Grijalbo ISBN 84-253-3961-8 and ISBN 978-84-8346-367-3
- Elisa Vázquez de Gey. The Princess of Kapurthala. (2008) Editorial Planeta ISBN 978-84-08-08262-0
- Javier Moro. Pasión india. (2005) Editorial Seix Barral ISBN 84-322-9663-5
- Manuel Ocón Dueñas: Anita Delgado. Ed. Arguval. 1986.
