= Kanjli =

- Village
- Location in Punjab, India Kanjli (India)
- Coordinates: 31.427137°N 75.367452°E
- Country: India
- State: Punjab
- District: Kapurthala

Government
  - Type: Panchayati raj (India)
  - Body: Gram panchayat

Population (2011)
  - Total: 1,211
- Sex ratio 636/575♂/♀

Languages
  - Official: Punjabi
  - Other spoken: Hindi
- Time zone: UTC+5:30 (IST)
- PIN: 144601
- Telephone code: 01822
- ISO 3166 code: IN-PB
- Vehicle registration: PB-09
- Website: kapurthala.gov.in

Kanjli is a village in Kapurthala district of Punjab State, India. It is located 5 kilometres (3.1 mi) from Kapurthala, which is both district and sub-district headquarters of Kanjli. The village is administrated by a Sarpanch, who is an elected representative.Moreover, It is the home of famous kabaddi player and wrestler Sikandar Kanjli and malkeet kanjli.

== Demography ==
According to the report published by Census India in 2011, Kanjli has total number of 235 houses and population of 1,211 of which include 636 males and 575 females. Literacy rate of Kanjli is 78.36%, higher than the state average of 75.84%. The population of children under the age of 6 years is 88 which is 7.27% of total population of Kanjli, and child sex ratio is approximately 833, lower than state average of 846.

== Population data ==
Particulars	Total	Male	Female
Total No. of Houses	235	-	-
Total Population	1,211	636	575
In the age group 0–6 years	88	48	40
Scheduled Castes (SC)	108	55	53
Scheduled Tribes (ST)	0	0	0
Literates	880	489	391
Illiterate	331	147	184
Total Worker	386	353	33
Main Worker	373	347	26
Marginal Worker	13	6	7

== Air travel connectivity ==
The closest airport to the village is Sri Guru Ram Dass Jee International Airport.
