= Sainik School, Kapurthala =

School in Kapurthala, India

Coordinates: 31°22′21″N 75°23′34″E

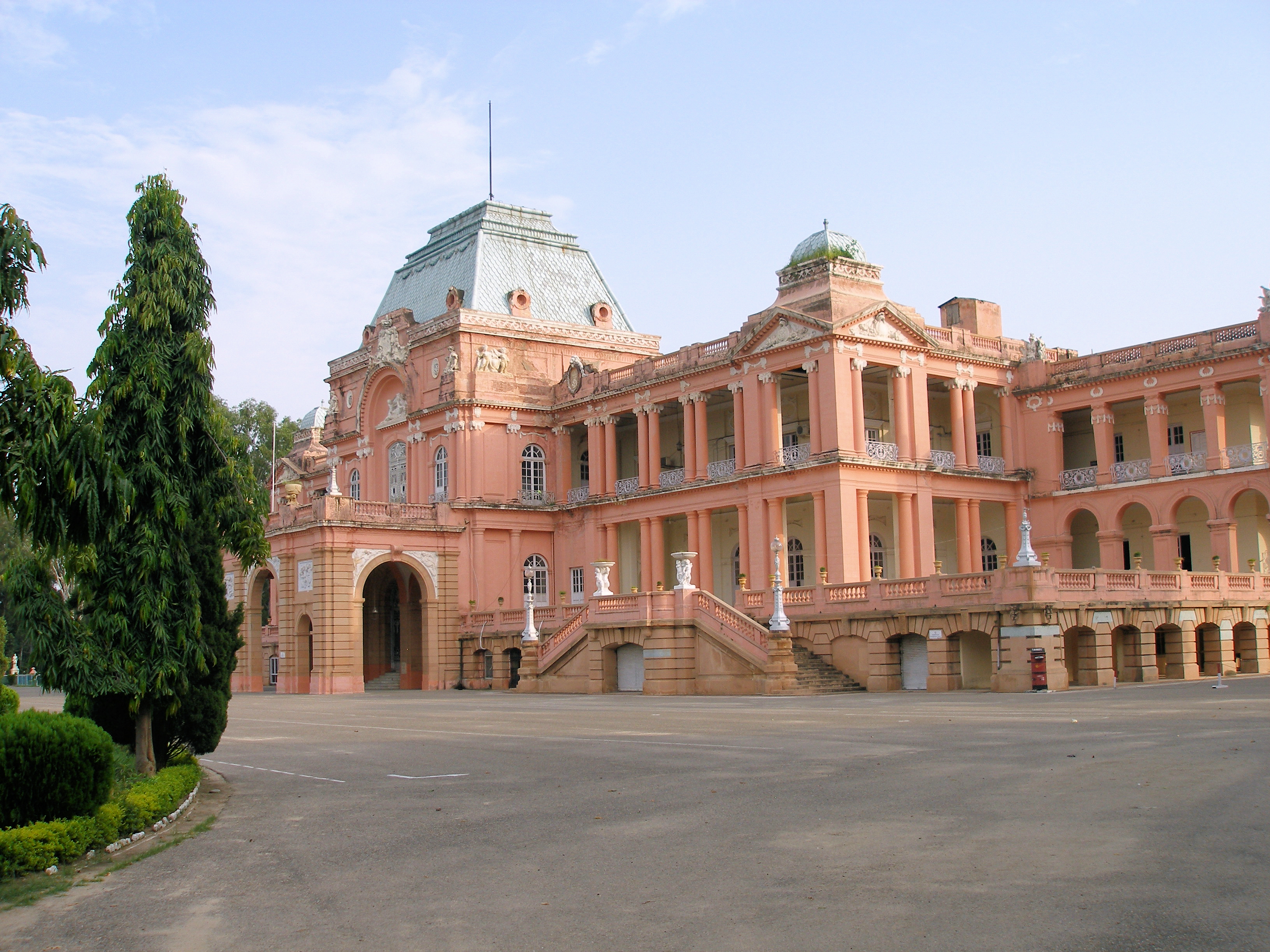
The school in 2013

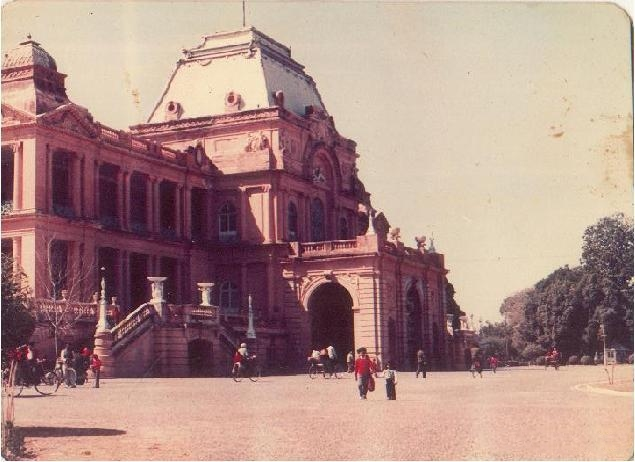
The school in 1984

Sainik School Kapurthala is one of 33 Sainik Schools across India. The school was inaugurated in July 1961 by the then Defence Minister V.K. Krishna Menon, with the objective of preparing boys and girls for entry into National Defence Academy in Khadakwasla. Its motto is "Knowledge, Humility and Discipline". It is a fully residential school for boys only, providing public school education. It has produced more than 1150 officers for the Indian armed forces through National Defence Academy. It is the only school among the 33 Sainik Schools which has held the Defence Minister's trophy continuously for nine years. The school was the former palace of Maharaja Jagatjit Singh of Kapurthala.

== See also ==
- Indian Naval Academy
- Indian Military Academy
