= King George VI Coronation Medal =

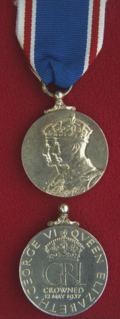
- Type: Commemorative medal
- Awarded for: Community contribution
- Presented by: United Kingdom and Commonwealth
- Eligibility: Commonwealth citizens
- Established: 12 May 1937

Highlights
- Total: 90,279
- Ribbon bar

Precedence
- Next (higher): King George V Silver Jubilee Medal
- Next (lower): Queen Elizabeth II Coronation Medal

The King George VI Coronation Medal was a commemorative medal, instituted to celebrate the coronation of King George VI and Queen Elizabeth.

== Issue ==
This medal was awarded as a personal souvenir of King George VI's coronation. It was awarded to the Royal Family and selected officers of state, officials and servants of the Royal Household, ministers, government officials, mayors, public servants, local government officials, and members of the navy, army, air force and police in Britain, her colonies and Dominions.

For Coronation and Jubilee medals, the practice up until 1977 was that United Kingdom authorities decided on a total number to be produced, then allocated a proportion to each of the Commonwealth countries and Crown dependencies and possessions. The award of the medals was then at the discretion of the local government authority, who were free to decide who would be awarded a medal and why.

A total of 90,279 medals were awarded, including:

- 6,887 to Australians
- 10,089 to Canadians
- about 1,700 to New Zealanders.

The medal was worn with other coronation and jubilee medals, immediately after campaign and polar medals, and before long service awards. Ladies could wear the medal near their left shoulder with the ribbon tied in the form of a bow.

== Description ==
- Designed by Percy Metcalfe.
- A circular, silver medal, 1.25 inches in diameter. Featured on the obverse are the conjoined effigies of King George VI and Queen Elizabeth, crowned and robed, facing left. The rim is not raised on this medal and there is no legend.
- The Royal Cypher "GRI" appears on the reverse, surmounted by a large crown, with the inscription "CROWNED / 12 MAY 1937" in two lines below the Royal Cypher. Around the rim of the medal is the inscription "GEORGE VI QVEEN ELIZABETH".
- The garter-blue ribbon is 1.25 inches (32 mm) wide, with a 3 millimetres wide white band, a 2½ millimetres wide red band and a 1½ millimetres wide white band, repeated in reverse order and separated by an 18 millimetres wide garter-blue band.
- The medal was awarded unnamed.
