= Sukhjit Singh (soldier) =

Indian military officer (born 1934)

Brigadier Sukhjit Singh MVC
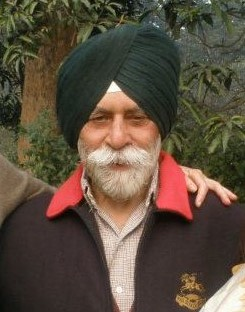
- Titular Maharaja of Kapurthala
- Born: Sukhjit Singh; 15 October 1934 (age 92); Bangalore, Kingdom of Mysore, British India (now Karnataka, India)
- Education: Indian Military Academy; The Doon School
- Military career
- Allegiance: India
- Branch: Indian Army
- Service years: 1954–1980
- Rank: Brigadier
- Service number: IC-6704
- Unit: Scinde Horse
- Commands: Scinde Horse
- Conflicts: India–Pakistan war of 1971; Battle of Basantar
- Awards: Maha Vir Chakra
- Pretender information
- Title(s): Maharaja of Kapurthala
- Throne(s) claimed: Kapurthala
- Pretend from: 19 July 1955 – 28 December 1971
- Monarchy abolished: Sovereign monarchy 1947 (Instrument of Accession); Titular monarchy 1971 (26th Amendment of the Indian Constitution)
- Royal House: Ahluwalia
- Father: Paramjit Singh
- Mother: Princess Lilavati Devi (of Kangra)
- Spouse: Gita Devi (m. 1957; sep. 1977)
- Issue: Gayatri Devi; Priti Devi; Shatrujit Singh; Amanjit Singh
- Predecessor: Paramjit Singh
- Successor: Shatrujit Singh
- Religion: Sikhism

Brigadier Maharaja Sukhjit Singh, MVC (born 15 October 1934) is a former Indian Army officer who served with the Scinde Horse. He was awarded the Maha Vir Chakra, India's second highest award for gallantry, for his leadership and bravery during the Battle of Basantar in the India–Pakistan war of 1971.

== Early life, education, and family ==
Sukhjit Singh was born on 15 October 1934 in Bangalore to Paramjit Singh, the Maharaja of Kapurthala State and his second wife, Lilavati Devi. At the time of his birth, his father was still the Tikka Raja (heir-apparent) to Jagatjit Singh. Singh had three paternal half-sisters, Indira Devi, Sushila Devi and Ourmilla Devi, by Brinda Devi, the first wife of his father, and an elder full-sister, Ash Kaur. He was educated at the Doon School, and then received military training at the Indian Military Academy. He married in 1957 at New Delhi to Gita Devi, the daughter of Ala Vajsur Khachar, the Darbar of Jasdan, by his second wife, Madhvi Devi. Gita died in 2023, and he and she had together two sons, Shatrujit Singh and Amanjit Singh, and two daughters, Gayatri Devi and Preeti Devi.

His fondest memory is of rides with his grandfather, Jagatjit Singh, "in a zebra-driven chariot in the zoological gardens of the palace", according to an interview he gave to The Tribune.

== Reign ==
Upon the death of his father on 19 July 1955, he succeeded him as the Maharaja of Kapurthala. His succession was recognised by the President of India. On 6 September 1970, the President of India, by the powers vested in him through article 366(22) in the Constitution of India, derecognised him.

== Military career ==
Singh was commissioned as an officer (second lieutenant) in the Scinde Horse on 6 June 1954. During the Indo-Pakistani War of 1971, Sukhjit Singh held the rank of Lt. Colonel. In the Battle of Basantar, Lt. Col. Sukhjit Singh was in command of The Scinde Horse (14 Horse) armored regiment, which was deployed in Shakargarh. On the night of 8 December, the regiment crossed into Pakistani territory and established itself near Nainan Kot. On 10 December, Pakistani forces launched a powerful armored counterattack which Lt. Col. Sukhjit Singh's regiment successfully resisted. Lt. Col. Sukhjit Singh's unit forced the Pakistani force to retreat after the loss of only one tank. The next day, under heavy artillery and mortar fire, Lt. Col. Sukhjit Singh led an operation to capture enemy tanks at Malakpur. In the ensuing engagement, his regiment destroyed eight Pakistani tanks and captured one officer, two junior commissioned officers and two other soldiers.

Lt. Col. Sukhjit Singh later received the Maha Vir Chakra, India's second highest award for gallantry in recognition of his efforts in the Battle of Basantar. Lt. Col. Sukhjit Singh eventually rose to the rank of Brigadier.

== Titles ==
- His Highness Farzand-i-Dilband Rasikh-al-Iqtidad-i-Daulat-i-Inglishia Raja-i-Rajagan Maharaja Sukhji Singh Bahadur, the Maharaja of Kapurthala.

== Gallery ==
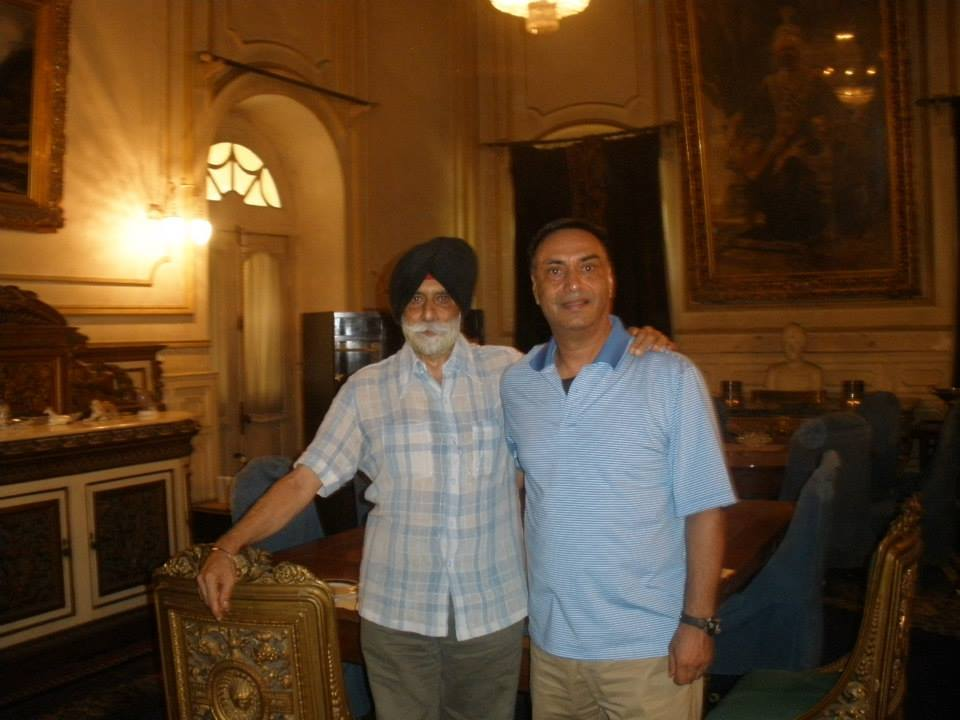
Brig. Sukhjit Singh is pictured here with his friend and a former army officer inside his Villa Buona Vista of Kapurthala

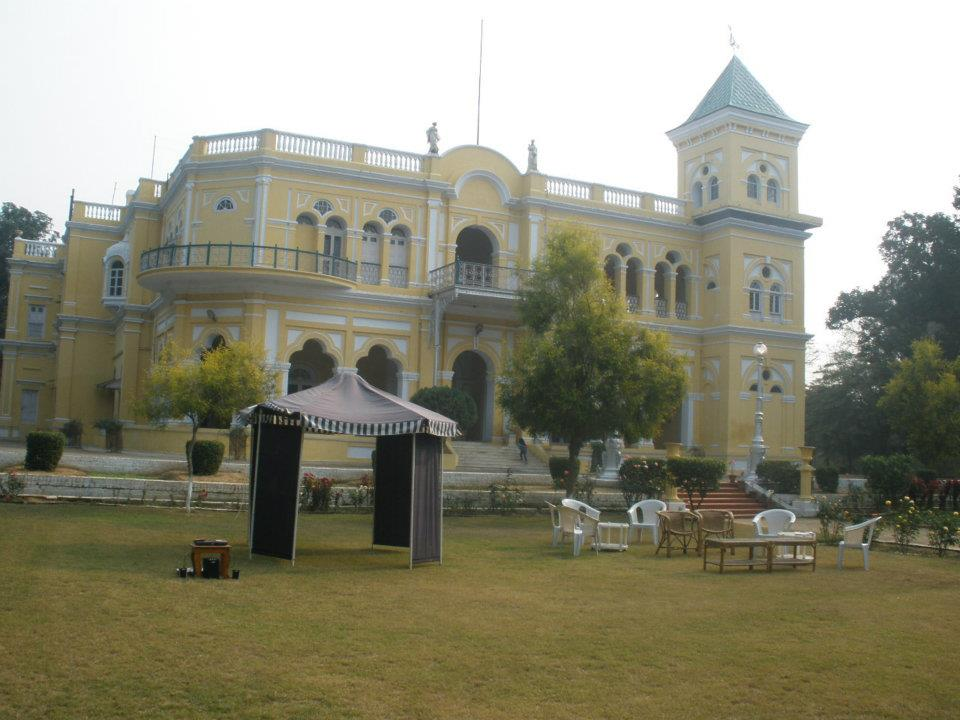
Kapurthala Royal family's "Villa Buona Vista of Kapurthala" India

== See also ==
- Prince, Patron and Patriarch
