= Jagatjit Singh =

Last ruling Maharaja of Kapurthala from 1877–1947

Jagatjit Singh GCSI GCIE GBE
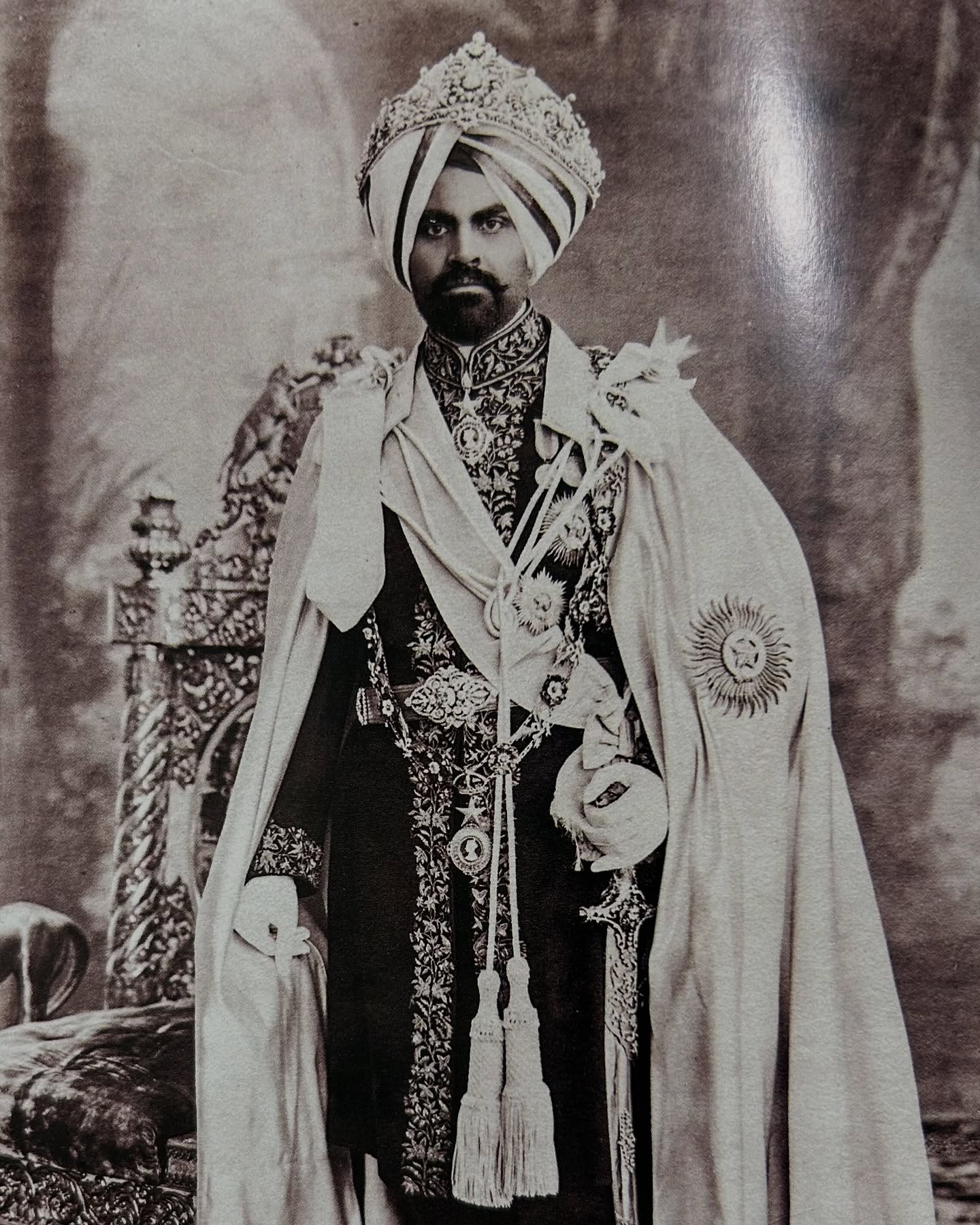
- Photograph of Maharaja Jagatjit Singh of Kapurthala State, by Bourne and Shepherd, ca.1900's–1910's

Maharaja of Kapurthala
- Reign: 3 September 1877 – 15 August 1947
- Coronation: 24 November 1890
- Predecessor: Kharak Singh (as Raja)
- Successor: Monarchy abolished Paramjit Singh (titular ruler)
- Born: 24 November 1872; Kapurthala, Kapurthala State, British India
- Died: 19 June 1949 (aged 76); Bombay, Bombay State, India
- Spouse: six wives
- Issue: five sons and one daughter (Amrit Kaur)
Names
- Sir Jagatjit Singh Sahib Bahadur
- Dynasty: Ahluwalia dynasty
- Father: Kharak Singh
- Mother: Anand Kaur Sahiba
- Religion: Sikh

Colonel Maharajah Sir Jagatjit Singh Sahib Bahadur (24 November 1872 – 19 June 1949) was the last ruling Maharaja of the princely state of Kapurthala during the British Raj in India, from 1877 until his death in 1949. He ascended to the throne of Kapurthala state on 16 October 1877 and assumed full ruling powers on 24 November 1890, as well indulging in travelling the world and being a Francophile.

== Early life and family ==
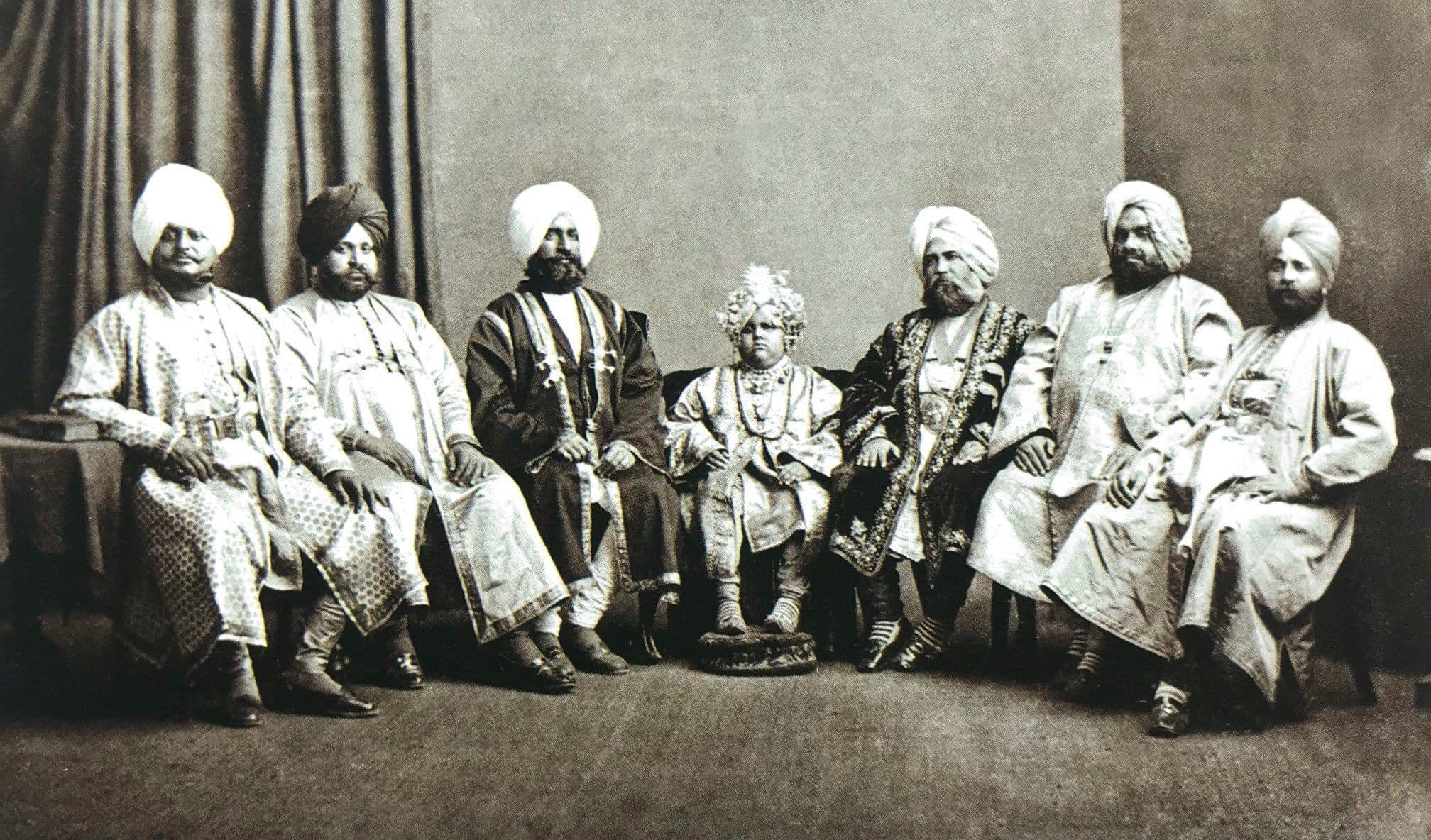
Photograph of the child-monarch Raja Jagatjit Singh of Kapurthala State and suite, ca.1880

Jagajit Singh received the title of Maharaja in 1911. He learned various languages like Punjabi, English, Hindi, French, Spanish, Italian etc. Like his contemporaries Maharaja Bhupinder Singh of Patiala and Maharaja Ranbir Singh of Jind, Jagatjit Singh was also a philanthropist. When he was young, he sang in front of the Viceroy with his friend, the next Maharaja Ram Singh of Dholpur, in French and Italian, which outraged many of the visitors.

He was the cousin of Sardar Bhagat Singh, one of the few Indian Justices of the High Court during the British Raj. His grandson Sukhjit Singh served as a Brigadier in the Indian Army. Another grandson Arun Singh was a Minister in the Rajiv Gandhi government who advised Indira Gandhi to declare Operation Blue Star.

== Career ==
=== Early career ===
His dream was for Kapurthala to be a 'Paris of the East'. He built the Jagatjit Palace in a French style modelled on the Palace of Versailles, the Moorish Mosque in the North African style “Maghrebi”, the Kapurthala War Memorial and other sites.

He also built a Gurdwara at Sultanpur Lodhi. An advocate of educational opportunities for girls, Maharaja Jagatjit Singh also supported numerous undertakings to ensure women received proper medical care under schemes first initiated under The Countess of Dufferin Fund, which provided medical aid and helped build hospitals and medical facilities exclusively for women.

=== Late career ===
He served as the Indian Representative to the League of Nations General Assembly in Geneva in 1925, 1927, and 1929, attended the Round Table Conference in 1931 and was Lt Governor of the PEPSU at the time of his death in 1949, aged 76.

He spent much of his time travelling; he visited China, Indonesia, Japan, Morocco, Italy, Spain, France, Great Britain, the United States of America, Brazil, Argentina and other areas. He had a liking for Japan and France.

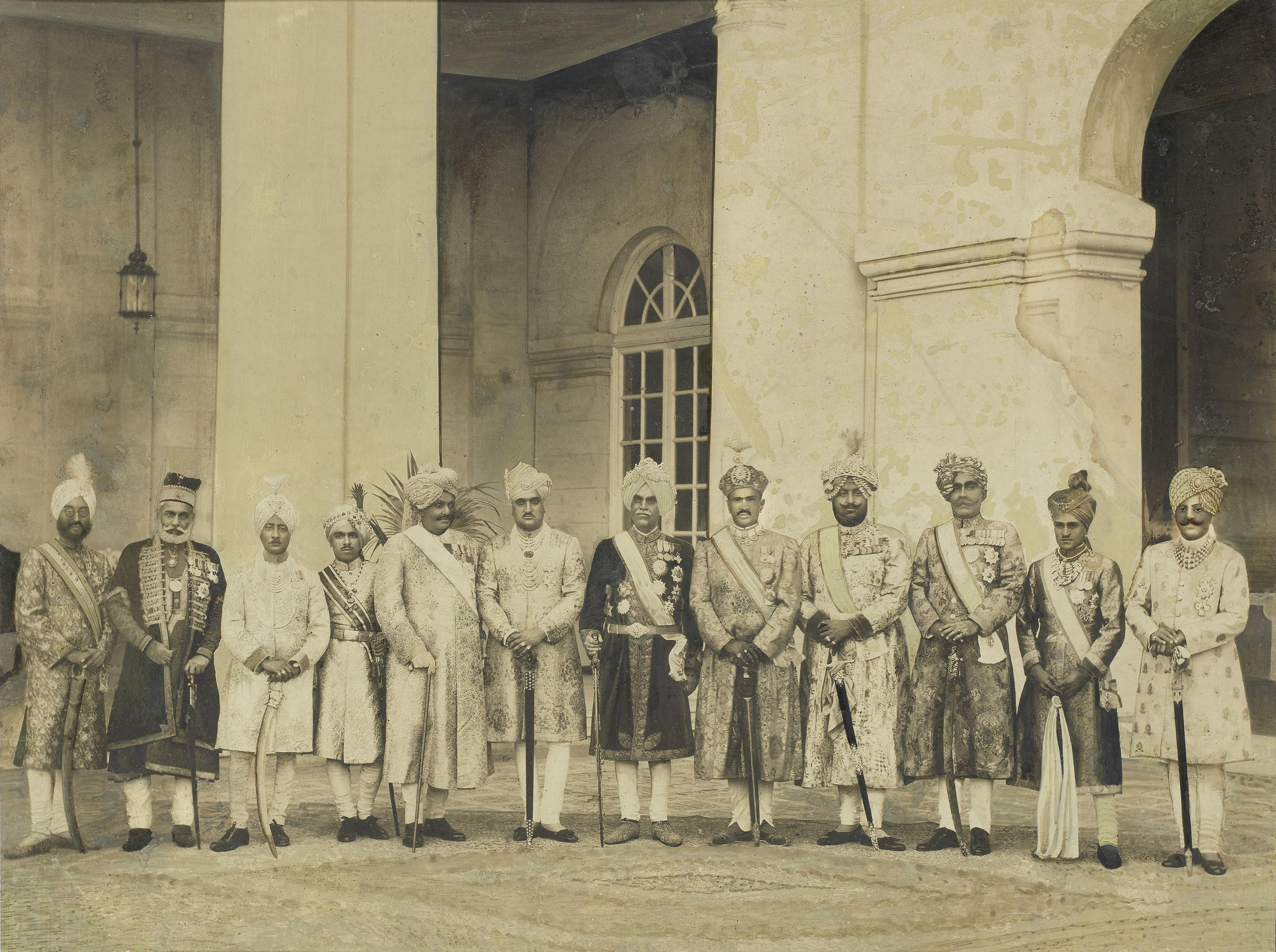
A group photograph of North Indian rulers, taken on the occasion of the Golden Jubilee of HH the Maharajah of Kapurthala, 30 November – 4 December 1927 at Kapurthala, Punjab

He was the first Sikh Maharaja to have cut his Kesh (uncut hair). The Shiromani Akali Dal took on this matter and pressured him. From 1946 he started becoming closer to his religious heritage and announced that his grandson (Sukhjit Singh) would be a Keshdhari Sikh.

During the Partition of India, 60 per cent of Muslims in his state were pushed out by his Kapurthala State Forces to Pakistan, leaving only 1 per cent afterwards.

== Death ==
Under his leadership, the Kapurthala State joined the Patiala and East Punjab States Union (P.E.P.S.U.) after the Partition of India. Maharaja Jagatjit Singh died in 1949.

== Marriages ==
- First marriage at Paprola, on 16 April 1886, to Maharani Harbans Kaur Sahiba, daughter of Mian Ranjit Singh Guleria of Paprola (died 17 October 1941 in Mussoorie from heart failure). They had two sons.
  - Paramjit Singh Sahib Bahadur
  - Mahijit Singh Sahib Bahadur
- Second marriage at Katoch, 1891, to Rani Parvati Kaur Sahiba, daughter of a Sardar of Katoch (died 20 February 1944 in Kapurthala). They had a son.
  - Amarjit Singh Sahib Bahadur
- Third marriage at Bashahr, 1892, to Rani Lakshmi Kaur Sahiba, a princess of a Rajput family from Bashahr (died September 1959 in Kapurthala).
- Fourth marriage at Jubbal, 1895, to Rani Kanari Sahiba, daughter of the Dewan of Jubbal (died circa 1910). They had a son and a daughter.
  - Karamjit Singh Sahib Bahadur
  - Amrit Kaur Sahiba
- Fifth marriage at Paris, 28 January 1908 (later divorced), to Rani Prem Kaur Sahiba [née Anita Delgado], (born 1890 in Málaga, Spain, died 7 July 1962 in Madrid, Spain from heart failure). They had a son.
  - Ajit Singh Sahib Bahadur
- Sixth marriage at Kapurthala, 1942, to Rani Tara Devi Sahiba [née Eugenie "Nina" Grosup]; she was an actress and the daughter of a Czech actress (Maria Eleanora Grosup) and a Hungarian aristocrat (Count Karátsonyi).

== Honours ==
=== British and Indian ===
- First Class of the Order of Hamid of the Rampur State of India 1926
- Knight Grand Commander of the Order of the Star of India (GCSI) 1911 Delhi Durbar Honours (previously appointed KCSI in the 1897 Diamond Jubilee Honours)
- Knight Grand Commander of the Order of the Indian Empire (GCIE) 1 January 1921
- Knight Grand Cross of the Order of the British Empire (GBE) 29 November 1927
- Queen Victoria Diamond Jubilee Medal in Gold 1897
- Delhi Durbar Medal in Gold 1903
- King George V Coronation Medal, with Delhi Durbar Clasp 1911
- King George V Silver Jubilee Medal 1935
- King George VI Coronation Medal 1937
- Indian Independence Medal 1947

=== Foreign ===
- Kingdom of Prussia:
  - Grand Cross of the Order of the Crown, 1st Class, 1911
- Kingdom of Egypt:
  - Grand Cordon of the Order of the Nile, 1924
- Morocco:
  - Grand Cordon of the Sharifan Order of Alaoui, 1924
- Kingdom of Italy:
  - Grand Cross of the Order of Saints Maurice and Lazarus, 1924
- Grand Cross of the Order of Merit of Chile 1925
- Grand Cross of the Order of the Sun of Peru 1925
- Grand Cross of the Order of the Red Cross of Honour and Merit of Cuba 1925
- Grand Cross of the Order of the Star of Romania 1926
- Grand Cross of the Order of Menelik II of Empire of Ethiopia 1928
- Grand Cross of the Order of Saint Sava of the Kingdom of Yugoslavia 1928
- Grand Cross of the Order of Charles III of the Kingdom of Spain 1928
- Grand Cordon of the Order of Glory of Tunisia 1928
- Grand Cross of the Royal Order of Cambodia 1929
- Grand Cordon of the Order of the Crown of Empire of Iran 1930
- Grand Cross of the Order of the White Lion, 1st Class of Czechoslovakia 1934
- Grand Cross of the Order of Saint Agatha of San Marino 1935
- Grand Cross of the Order of Saint Sylvester of the Vatican 1935
- Grand Cross of the Legion of Honour of France 1948 (Grand Officer: 1924)

== In media ==
- Probably as a reminiscence of his marriage to Anita Delgado, Don Pimpón, a character in the Spanish version of Sesame Street, claimed to have travelled the world extensively with "his friend the Maharaja of Kapurthala."
- He appeared in the American Horror Story: Freak Show episode "Orphans" in a flashback where he gives Elsa Mars custody of Mahadevi "Ma Petite" Patel.

== See also ==
- Rajkumari Bibiji Amrit Kaur, the first female Indian Cabinet Minister (his first cousin).

== Footnotes ==
Jagatjit Singh Ahluwalia dynasty Born: 24 November 1872 Died: 19 June 1949
Regnal titles
Preceded by Kharak Singh	Raja of Kapurthala; 1877–1911	Himself as Maharaja
New title	Maharaja of Kapurthala; 1911–1947	Succeeded by Monarchy abolished Accession to the Dominion of India
