= Bhukai (subcaste) =

Bhukai/Bukai
- Jāti: Sikh Karal/Kalal (Ahluwalia); Hindu Karals
- Religions: Hinduism; Sikhism; Islam
- Country: India; Pakistan
- Kingdom (original): Kapurthala State

Bhukai or Bukai is an Indian sub-caste of the Sikh Ahluwalia and Hindu Karal (Ahluwalia) castes. People belonging to this sub-caste are natives of South Asia.

== Origin ==
Bhukai (also spelled Bukai or Bukhai) are a South Asian sub‑caste historically associated with the Karal/Kalal (Kharral) community and the Sikh Ahluwalia clan. They practice endogamy as a division under Ahluwalias, who are historically related to Hindu Karals. Members of this group have followed Hinduism, Sikhism, and Islam.

== See also ==
- Ahluwalia (misl)
- Ahluwalia (surname)
- Judge (subcaste)
- Tulsi (Sikh clan)
