= Bamral (subcaste) =

Bamral/Bhamral
- Abbreviation: Bamra/Bhamra
- Jāti: Ahluwalia (caste)
- Classification: Forward caste
- Religions: Sikhism; Hinduism
- Country: India; Pakistan
- Original state: Punjab
- Related groups: Ahluwalia (misl); Rekhi (subcaste)
- Kingdom (original): Kapurthala State

Bamral or Bhamral is an Indian subcaste of the Ahluwalia caste. They are natives of the Punjab region.

== Origin ==
Bamrals are also known as Bhamra or Bhamral. They are one of the various divisions under the Ahluwalia caste previously known as Karals/Kalals or Kharrals. Majority of them follow either Sikhism or Hinduism. Those Ahluwalias who became Muslims re-identified themselves as Kakezai. The Bamrals are a part of Ahluwalias who are known to practice endogamy.

== See also ==
- Ahluwalia (misl)
- Ahluwalia (surname)
- Judge (subcaste)
- Tulsi (Sikh clan)
