= Rekhi (subcaste) =

- Jāti: Ahluwalia
- Religions: Sikhism; Hinduism
- Country: India; Pakistan
- Original state: Punjab
- Region: South Asia
- Kingdom (original): Kapurthala State

Rekhi or Raikhy is an Indian Punjabi subcaste of Ahluwalia community.

== Notable people ==
- Arjan Raikhy, English footballer
- Avinesh Rekhi, Indian television actor
- Ben Rekhi, American director
- Dia Mirza Rekhi, Indian actress and producer
- Kamaljeet (or Shashi Rekhi), Indian actor
- Kanwal Rekhi, Indian-American businessman
- Rishi Rich, British record producer

== See also ==
- Ahluwalia (caste)
- Ahluwalia (surname)
- Bamral (subcaste)
- Bhukai (subcaste)
- Bimbat (subcaste)
- Jassa Singh Ahluwalia
- Paintal
- Punjab
- Sikand
- Sikhs
- Surname
