= Walia =

ging

Walia is a surname of Punjabi origin. It is one of the surnames used by both Sikh and Hindu Ahluwalias and Khatris. Notable people who bear this surname include:

== Authors ==
- Harsha Walia, South Asian activist and author of Indian origin

== Armed forces ==
- Major Sudhir Kumar Walia, (1969–1999), AC, SM, Bar ADC, Major of Indian Army, martyred in 1999
- Jasbir Walia, PVSM, VM, VSM, ADC, former Commander-in-Chief, Strategic Forces Command
- Lt. Gen. Arvind Walia, AVSM, Engineer-in-Chief of Indian Army
- A. J. S. Walia, former Air Vice Marshal, aviation business executive
- Lt. Gen. M. M. Walia, PVSM, AVSM, SM, (Colonel Madras Regiment service 1994–1996)
- Inderpal Singh Walia, AVSM, VM, Senior Air Staff Officer, Eastern Air Command
- Harinder Jeet Walia, AVSM, Air Officer Commanding, HQ, Eastern Air Command

== Politicians ==
- Ashok Kumar Walia (1948–2021), politician
- Kiran Walia (born 1944), politician (a former minister)
- Charanjit Singh Walia, former MP, politician

== Law ==
- Justice Lakhvinder Singh Walia, Judge, Court of Appeal, Botswana
- Justice Bawa Singh Walia, Punjab and Haryana High Court
- Inderjit Singh Walia, Judge, Punjab and Haryana High Court

== Entertainment ==
- Bunty Walia, film producer
- Gunjan Walia (born 1986), television actress
- Jasmin Walia (born 1991), British-Indian singer
- Juspreet Singh Walia, film producer, assistant director and restauranteur
- Kanwaljit Singh (actor), film and television actor
- Khushwant Walia (born 1987), television actor
- Niki Aneja Walia (born 1972), television actress
- Roshni Walia (born 2001), Bollywood and television actress
- Sonu Walia (born 1964), Bollywood actress

== Sports ==
- Ravi Walia (born 1973), Canadian figure skater
- Manjit Walia, Indian Hurdlern Hurdler

== Others ==
- Harmeet D. Walia, American endodontist
