= Ahluwalia (surname) =

- Pronunciation: Ah_Lu_Wa_Lia
- Language: Panjabi

Origin
- Origin: Punjab
- Meaning: Those "From Ahlu" (a village in Lahore)
- Region of origin: South Asia

Other names
- Alternative spelling: Ahluvalia/Ahlajia/Ahlawal
- Short form: Walia
- See also: Ahluwalia (caste) Ahluwalia (misl)

Ahluwalia is a surname native to the Punjab region of India. It is derived from the words "Ahlu" (a village in Lahore) and "walia" (a Punjabi-language adjectival suffix). It was first adopted by the Sikh chief Jassa Singh, the founder and first leader of the Ahluwalia misl. The surname was adopted by many including his caste followers and soldiers, leading to the formation of the Ahluwalia caste. One of the surnames of Ahluwalia caste and its shortened form is Walia.

Notable people who bear the surname Ahluwalia include:

== Historical leaders ==
- Jassa Singh Ahluwalia, Sikh Confederacy leader and founder of Kapurthala State
- Bhag Singh Ahluwalia, second leader of Ahluwalia misl

== Royals ==
- Fateh Singh Ahluwalia, Raja of Kapurthala State
- Jagatjit Singh Ahluwalia, last ruling Maharaja of Kapurthala (1847–1947)

== Politicians ==
- S. S. Ahluwalia, Indian politician and former minister, Government of India
- Kirith Entwistle (Kirith Kaur Ahluwalia), British Politician, M.P. for Bolton North East
- Upinder Kaur Ahluwalia, politician, former mayor of Panchkula
- Harikant Ahluwalia, Indian politician, Mayor of Meerut
- Sindi Hawkins (Satinder Kaur Ahluwalia), former MLA and Minister, British Columbia, Canada

== Army ==
- V. K. Ahluwalia, former Commander-in-Chief of Central command of the Indian Army
- Padamjit Singh Ahluwalia, former Commander-in-Chief of Western Air Command of the Indian Air Force

== Entertainment ==
- Ashim Ahluwalia, Indian film director and screenwriter
- Dolly Ahluwalia, Indian actress and costume designer
- Priya Ahluwalia, designer, founder of Ahluwalia apparel brand
- Sukhdev Ahluwalia, Indian film director
- Shabir Ahluwalia, Indian television actor
- Nimrit Kaur Ahluwalia, Miss Manipur 2018, Indian model and actress
- Waris Ahluwalia, Indian-American designer
- Harry Ahluwalia, Indian actor
- Jassa Ahluwalia, English actor
- Kiran Ahluwalia, Indo-Canadian singer

== Business ==
- Iloosh Ahluwalia, Indian businesswoman
- Poonam Ahluwalia, Indian Social Entrepreneur
- Sukhpal Singh Ahluwalia, British businessman

== Economists ==
- Montek Singh Ahluwalia, former Deputy Chairman of the Indian Planning Commission
- Isher Judge Ahluwalia, Indian economist

== Sports ==
- H. P. S. Ahluwalia, Indian mountaineer
- Manraj Ahluwalia, English cricketer

== Activists ==
- Kiranjit Ahluwalia, Indian Women Right's Activist

== Judge ==
- Gurpal Singh Ahluwalia,Justice of Madhya Pradesh High Court

== See also ==
- Paintal
- Sikand
