= Ahluwalia =

Ahluwalia may refer to:

- Ahluwalia (misl), a sovereign state in what is now the Punjab region in India and Pakistan
- Ahluwalia (surname), a surname in the Punjab region
- Ahluwalia (caste), a caste in the Punjab region
