= Sikand =

- Pronunciation: Sea_Kan_The
- Language: Panjabi

Origin
- Origin: Punjab
- Meaning: related with "Alexander The Great"
- Region of origin: South Asia

Other names
- Alternative spelling: Sikcand/Sicand/Sikan
- See also: Ahluwalia (caste) Ahluwalia (misl)

Sikand or Sikcand is a Punjabi surname originating from the Punjab region of South Asia. It is one of the exogamous clan divisions under Ahluwalias. It is native to Punjab region.

Notable people with the name include:

- Gagan Sikand (born 1984), Canadian politician
- Nandini Sikand, Indian filmmaker and dancer
- Pran Krishan Sikand (1920–2013), Indian actor
- Sandiip Sikcand, Indian filmmaker
- Sunil Sikand (born 1949), Indian film director
- Yoginder Sikand (born 1967), Indian writer and academic

== See also ==
- Ahluwalia (surname)
- Judge (subcaste)
- Neb (surname)
- Paintal
- Tulsi (Sikh clan)
