= Judge (subcaste) =

Origin
- Meaning: related with providing justice
- Region of origin: South Asia

Other names
- See also: Ahluwalia (caste) Ahluwalia (misl)

Judge, Jaj, Jajj or Jujj is an Indian sub-caste of both Hindu and Sikh Ahluwalias. People of this sub-caste are either natives of or related to the Punjab region.

Notable people with the name include:

- Bani J (born Gurbani Judge), Indian model and actress
- Iloosh Ahluwalia, (born Iloosh Judge), Indian painter and businesswoman
- Isher Judge Ahluwalia, (1945–2020), Indian economist
- Karamjeet Singh Judge, lieutenant of 15th Punjab Regiment during World War II

== See also ==
- Ahluwalia (surname)
- Paintal
- Neb (surname)
- Tulsi (Sikh clan)
