= Tulsi (Sikh clan) =

Indian clan

- Pronunciation: Tul_See
- Language: Sanskrit

Origin
- Origin: India
- Meaning: related with "Tulsi" (a plant sacred in Hinduism)
- Region of origin: South Asia

Other names
- Alternative spelling: Toolsi
- See also: Ahluwalia (caste) Ahluwalia (misl)

Tulsi is an Indian clan of the Sikh Ahluwalias. People from this clan are either natives of or related to Punjab region.

== Notable people ==
- K. T. S. Tulsi, Indian politician, MP of Rajya Sabha and Supreme Court advocate
- Rajkavi Inderjeet Singh Tulsi, Indian poet, lyricist and musical artist

== See also ==
- Ahluwalia (surname)
- Paintal
- Neb (surname)
- Judge (subcaste)
