= Kharak Singh (ruler) =

Raja of Kapurthala (1870 – 1877)

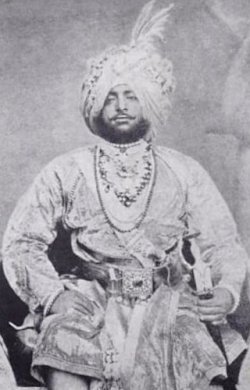
- Singh

Raja of Kapurthala and Raja-i-Rajgan of Kapurthala Estates in Oudh
- Reign: 2 April 1870 – September 1877
- Investiture: 12 May 1870
- Predecessor: Randhir Singh
- Successor: Jagatjit Singh
- Superintendent: Lepel Griffin; Charles Montgomery Rivaz
- Born: c. 1850
- Died: September 1877 (aged 26–27)
- Spouse: Anand Kaur
- Issue: Jagatjit Singh
- House: Kapurthala
- Dynasty: Ahluwalia
- Father: Randhir Singh
- Religion: Sikhism

Kharak Singh (1850 – September 1877) was Raja of Kapurthala and Raja-i-Rajgan of the Kapurthala Estates in Oudh from 2 April 1870 until his death in 1877.

== Early life and family ==
Singh was born in 1850 to Randhir Singh, the Maharaja of Kapurthala. He married Anand Kaur, and the two had issue, a son, Jagatjit Singh. On 15 March 1870, when Randhir Singh departed Kapurthala for England, he entrusted him with the temporary administration of the state, in which he was to be aided by a council of ministers. However, all major decisions concerning the state were still required to be referred to Randhir Singh. His father died on 2 April 1870 at Aden, and he received his body at Mumbai, after which he took it to Nashik and there performed his father's cremation.

== Reign ==
Upon his father’s death, he immediately succeeded to the throne of Kapurthala, and his succession to his father’s title, rank and dignity was duly recognised by the Viceroy and Governor-General of India. At the same time, he also became the Raja-i-Rajgan of Kapurthala Estates in Oudh. His formal installation, however, did not take place until 12 May 1870. The ceremony was attended by a number of guests and by H. W. H. Coxe, the Commissioner of Jalandhar, as the representative of the Government of India. On the occasion, all customary rites were duly performed, and khilats were presented to him by the Government and the Ruling Princes. On the occasion, his subjects presented him with Rs. 1,25,000 and asked him to erect a memorial in memory of his father. Believing that continuing his father's work in education and public welfare was the most meaningful tribute to his memory, he announced the opening of a college and a hospital in the name of his father. He allocated Rs. 20,000 towards improving the existing schools building and Rs. 5,000 for the construction of a hospital building at Kapurthala. The remaining Rs. 100,000 was invested in government securities to generate an annual interest of Rs. 5,000. He further contributed Rs. 100,000 of his own funds to double the annual interest income and pledged an additional Rs. 10,000 per annum to support the college and hospital. To commemorate Donald McLeod, the former Lieutenant-Governor of the Punjab, he donated Rs. 25,000, and this amount was used to establish an annual prize for the best vernacular work on natural science that was open to all Indians. In 1872, he purchased the area of Derpura in the Kheri district, and in 1873 he further purchased that of Bhogpur in the Bijnor district. He initially ran the state with great energy but soon became mentally ill. At first, a three-member council was set up to manage the administration, but this arrangement quickly failed. Following this, in 1875, a British officer of the Punjab Commission was put in charge of the administration of the State as Superintendent. Lepel Griffin was the first British officer to assume this office, and he was succeeded in the office by Charles Montgomery Rivaz.

== Death ==
He died at Dharamshala in September 1877, and Jagatjit Singh succeeded to his title, rank and dignity.
