= Neb (surname) =

- Language: Panjabi

Origin
- Origin: Punjab
- Region of origin: South Asia

Other names
- Alternative spelling: Nab/Nebh/Nabh
- See also: Ahluwalia (caste) Ahluwalia (misl)

Neb is an Indian surname native to Punjab region. It is another name of Ahluwalia caste.

== Origin ==
The Karals or Ahluwalias who were natives of Patiala and Nabha states in the Sikh Empire, now part of both India and Pakistan were called Nebs. It was often used to describe them as a title. Historically, Neb were involved in trading, art of traditional pottery and in the Dal Khalsa (Sikh army). During British rule, they also started working in the civil or administrative jobs. They were known to be of great characteristics within the community. In modern times, they are working in diverse fields.

== Religion ==
Majority of them follow either Hinduism or Sikhism. A small minority of them profess Islam and are known as Kakazai.

== Notable people ==
- Vinod Neb (1942–2024), Indian Air Force fighter pilot

== See also ==
- Ahluwalia (misl)
- Kakazai
- Paintal
- Sikand
- Sikhs
