= Kapurthala Estates (Oudh) =

Oudh estates of the Kapurthala Raj

Kapurthala Estates in Oudh
- 1859–1952
- Area
  - 1901: 1,877.74 km^{2} (725.00 sq mi)
- Population
  - 1901: 314,351
- History
  - Established: 1859
  - Uttar Pradesh Zamindari Abolition and Land Reforms Act, 1950: 1 July 1952
Succeeded by
India
- Today part of: Uttar Pradesh

The Kapurthala Estates in Oudh were a group of estates in the Uttar Pradesh that were held by the royal family of Kapurthala. Some of these were granted to the family by the British Government of India in recognition of its assistance to the British during the Indian Rebellion of 1857, while others were purchased by the family.

== Area ==
The area of these estates was 725 square miles. The estates consisted of 461,032 acres.

== Population ==
The population of these estates was estimated in 1901 to be 314,351.

== History ==
After receiving the news of the revolt in Delhi during the Sepoy Mutiny, John Lawrence immediately contacted ruling chiefs and influential figures across the Punjab to declare their loyalty to the British and aid them. Randhir Singh, the Raja of Kapurthala, responded to his call by placing all his resources at the disposal of the East India Company. He immediately marched into Jalandhar at the head of his troops, which consisted of 1,200 infantrymen, 200 cavalrymen and five guns. He was also accompanied by his brother Bikrama Singh. He remained at Jalandhar for several months. When the European troops there departed for Delhi, he provided escorts for the women and families of soldiers who remained behind. Later, his cavalry accompanied Johnstone when he set out to pursue the mutineers who had revolted at Jalandhar. Their departure caused considerable alarm among the city's inhabitants, many of whom feared for their safety and contemplated leaving. He personally visited them to allay their fears and reassure them of their safety. His troops also guarded the civil station, the treasury and the jail in the city. He also dispatched troops to Hoshiarpur to maintain order there. Though the upkeep of such a force placed considerable strain on his finances, he chose to borrow money to cover the expenses. Following the fall of Delhi, the East India Company ordered the inhabitants of the Doaba to surrender their weapons, and he actively assisted in enforcing the order. In recognition of his services, one year's tribute payable by Kapurthala was remitted by the Government of India, and its annual payment was reduced by Rs. 25,000. He was also awarded a khillat (transl. robe of honour) valued at Rs. 15,000, while Bikrama Singh received one valued at Rs. 5,000. In addition, he was granted an eleven-gun salute, and both he and Bikrama Singh received honorary distinctions. With the approval of Government, in May 1858, accompanied by Bikrama Singh, he led a contingent of his troops into Oudh, and there for ten months his force did active service in the field. Six times they were engaged with the enemy, captured nine guns, and it was only in March 1859 that they returned to Kapurthala.

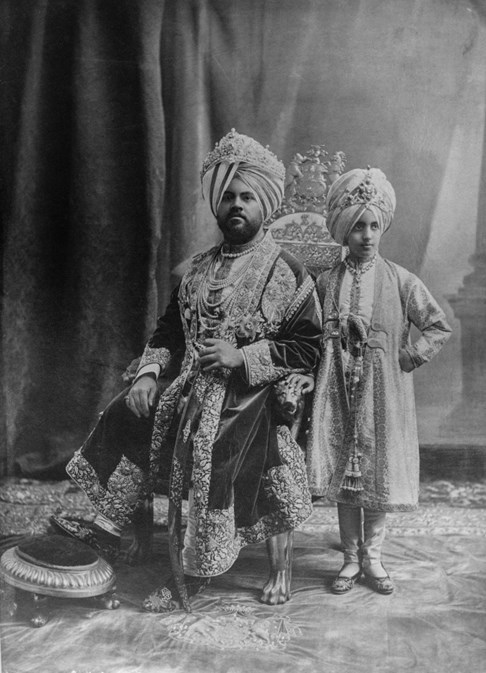
Jagatjit Singh with Paramjit Singh

In recognition of his services in Oudh, the Government awarded him a khillat valued at Rs. 5,000 and a sum of Rs. 200,000. The native officers serving in his contingent each received a khillat valued at Rs. 500 from the Government, while the English officers attached to the contingent were formally thanked for their services. Randhir in 1859 was also granted the taluk of Baundi, Parsauli and Bhatauli, situated in the districts of Gonda, Bahraich and Kheri respectively, on an istimrari tenure. Bikrama, meanwhile, was granted the estate of Ikauna (or Akauna). These estates were granted to the two in perpetuity. Baundi comprised 189,093 acres, Bhatauli 57,438 acres and Ikauna 177,284 acres. Baundi and Bhatauli were originally held by the Raikwar family, while Ikauna was held by the Janwar family. Following the Indian Rebellion of 1857, the Government confiscated these estates from their respective taluqdars on account of their opposition to the East India Company. In 1869, under an arbitration order by Henry Davies, the then Chief Commissioner of Oudh, the estate of Ikauna came into the possession of Randhir, and Bikrama instead received lands in Bareilly and Lakhimpur valued at 550,000 rupees, which were paid for by Kapurthala. Randhir's son Kharak Singh, in his reign, enlarged these estates by purchasing the area of Derpura in Kheri in 1872, and that of Bhogpur in Bijnor in 1873.

Following Kharak's death on 5 September 1877, Jagatjit Singh succeeded to the estates. Upon Jagatjit Singh's death on 19 June 1949, his son, Paramjit Singh, succeeded to the estates. Under Article XII of the PEPSU Covenant of Merger, the Government of India guaranteed Paramjit Singh full ownership, use and enjoyment of the estates.

== Disestablishment ==
These estates remained under the family's control until 1 July 1952, when the Uttar Pradesh Zamindari Abolition and Land Reforms Act, 1950, came into force and abolished the intermediary proprietary rights of talukdars and zamindars, and vested all land rights in the Government of Uttar Pradesh.

== Finances ==
The table below shows the financial accounts of the estates during each Fasli year from 1308 to 1324.

Statement of Income and Expenditure (1308–1324 Fasli)
Year (Fasli)	Income (Rs.)				Expenditure (Rs.)		Total (Rs.)	Balance (Rs.)	Ref.
Year (Fasli)	Balance of previous year	Present-year	Total	Paid to State	Land revenue	Other expenses	Total (Rs.)	Balance (Rs.)	Ref.
1308	1,97,819	12,04,799	14,02,618	6,91,270	3,16,650	2,13,523	12,21,452	1,81,166	
1309	1,81,166	12,50,620	14,31,786	7,29,627	3,20,554	2,06,510	12,56,691	1,75,095	
1310	1,75,095	12,66,897	14,41,992	6,54,156	1,83,486	2,09,967	10,47,609	3,94,383	
1311	3,94,383	12,73,821	16,68,204	7,50,000	3,37,937	2,05,292	12,93,329	3,74,875	
1312	3,74,875	13,07,142	16,82,017	7,75,000	4,51,051	2,13,372	14,69,443	2,12,574	
1313	2,12,574	13,60,429	15,73,003	8,76,000	2,10,216	3,10,036	13,96,252	1,76,751	
1314	1,76,751	12,56,831	14,36,582	7,96,174	3,23,802	2,50,570	13,70,566	66,016	
1315	66,016	7,00,588	7,66,604	1,38,828	1,88,080	2,44,265	5,36,173	2,00,431	
1316	2,00,431	15,66,771	17,67,202	10,78,617	3,78,092	2,66,594	16,73,303	93,899	
1317	93,899	14,50,195	14,99,094	9,04,967	3,19,180	1,90,237	14,14,384	84,710	
1318	84,710	14,16,454	15,01,164	8,54,172	3,11,078	1,86,170	12,51,420	1,49,744	
1319	1,49,744	16,35,469	17,85,213	11,18,700	2,71,222	2,06,294	15,96,216	1,88,997	
1320	1,88,997	16,18,119	18,07,116	9,28,987	4,04,209	2,28,483	15,61,679	2,45,437	
1321	2,45,437	15,59,393	18,04,830	8,51,271	3,28,901	2,29,123	14,09,295	3,95,535	
1322	3,95,535	15,59,312	19,54,847	9,83,098	3,22,269	2,07,613	15,12,980	4,41,867	
1323	4,41,867	16,11,675	20,53,542	12,19,795	3,24,523	2,21,351	17,65,669	2,87,873	
1324	2,87,873	17,40,929	20,22,802	14,11,869	3,24,324	2,00,755	19,36,949	91,853	

== Rulers ==
=== Titles and styles ===
The talukdar of these estates enjoyed the title of Raja-i-Rajgan. It was originally bestowed as a hereditary distinction by the Government upon Randhir Singh on 12 March 1861 in order to give him a position above that of the taluqdars of Oudh. Since the talukdar was also the ruler of Kapurthala, his complete titles were: His Highness Farzand-i-Dilband Rasikh-al-Iqtidad-i-Daulat-i-Inglishia Raja-i-Rajagan Maharaja (personal name) Singh Bahadur, Maharaja of Kapurthala. Earlier, the title of ruler of Kapurthala was Raja, and from 12 December 1911 it became Maharaja, when it was conferred as a hereditary distinction on Jagatjit Singh.

=== Salute ===
In his capacity as the ruler of Kapurthala, the talukdar enjoyed a dynastic salute of 13 guns and a permanent local salute of 15 guns. Originally, the dynastic salute was of 13 guns, and was conferred first on Randhir Singh, and was raised during the reign of Jagatjit Singh to 13 guns, along with a permanent local salute of 15 guns.

=== Powers ===
Unlike Kapurthala, where the ruler held sovereign powers, he did not hold such powers in these estates and held them strictly as a landlord under the Government.

=== List ===
Raja-i-Rajgan		Life			Reign		Ref.
Name	Portrait	Birth	Father	Death	Accession	Ended	Ref.
Randhir Singh	Photograph of Randhir Singh	26 March 1831	Nihal Singh	2 April 1870	1859	2 April 1870	
Kharak Singh	Photograph of Kharak Singh	1850	Randhir Singh	September 1877	2 April 1870	5 September 1877	
Jagatjit Singh	Photograph of Jagatjit Singh	24 November 1872	Kharak Singh	19 June 1949	5 September 1877	19 June 1949	
Paramjit Singh	Photograph of Paramjit Singh	19 May 1892	Jagatjit Singh	19 July 1955	19 June 1949	1 July 1952	
Pretender
Paramjit Singh					1 July 1952	19 July 1955	
Sukhjit Singh	Photograph of Sukhjit Singh	15 October 1934	Paramjit Singh	—	19 July 1955	—	

=== Managers ===
- Dewan Banna Mal.
- Kharram Rae.
- Harnam Singh: In 1876, Lepel Griffin, then Superintendent of Kapurthala, recommended to the Government of Punjab that Harnam Singh be appointed manager of the state's estates in Oudh. Following the Government's approval, Griffin took Harnam Singh to Oudh to familiarise him with the responsibilities of the position. Harnam Singh, however, did not formally assume charge of the estates until May 1877. Following Jagatjit Singh's accession to the throne of Kapurthala, the State Council retained Harnam Singh as manager of the estates. He held the position for a total of eighteen years. As a manager, he received a substantial salary and was afterwards granted a pension by the state.
- Lala Sundar Dass.
- A. R. Wood.

=== Superintendents ===
- Mahijit Singh, a son of Jagatjit Singh, served as the superintendent of these estates.
- Paramjit Singh, a son of Jagatjit Singh, served as the superintendent of these estates.
