= Pental =

Pental may refer to:

- A quinary or base 5 number system
- Pental (company), an Australian manufacturer of cleaning products
- Deepak Pental (born 1951), Indian academic and geneticist
- Pental Island, Victoria, Australia

== See also ==
- Paintal, a surname
- Pentanal, an organic compound
- Pentala Harikrishna (born 1986), Indian chess grandmaster
- Pentel, Japanese stationery company
