= Euro Car Parts =

Distributor of car parts in the UK

- Industry: Automotive
- Founded: 1978
- Founder: Sukhpal Singh Ahluwalia
- Headquarters: Tamworth, Staffordshire, England
- Products: Car parts, Car accessories, Car maintenance, In-car technology
- Revenue: £988,215,000 (2016) £904,671,000 (2015)
- Number of employees: 9,000 (2016)
- Website: www.eurocarparts.com

Euro Car Parts is a distributor of car parts and accessories, with around 200 locations in Europe.

== History ==
The company was founded by Sukhpal Singh Ahluwalia, when he opened a motor parts shop in Willesden, London in 1978. The business was originally established to supply parts for BMW, Mercedes-Benz, Porsche and Volkswagen vehicles.

In October 2011, the company was sold to LKQ Corporation of Chicago, for £225 million.

In April 2014, Singh announced that he had to leave the company, in order to pursue other interests.

In November 2014, Singh rejoined the company, being elected to the board of directors.

By 2015, the business had approximately two hundred branches.

During 2016, the business began supplying parts for a wider variety of vehicle makes and models.

In December 2018, following a dispute with owners LKQ over UK job cuts, Singh left the business again. The business's then CEO Martin Gray, COO Steve Horne, and the company's head of trading also resigned.

== Operations, locations and stores ==
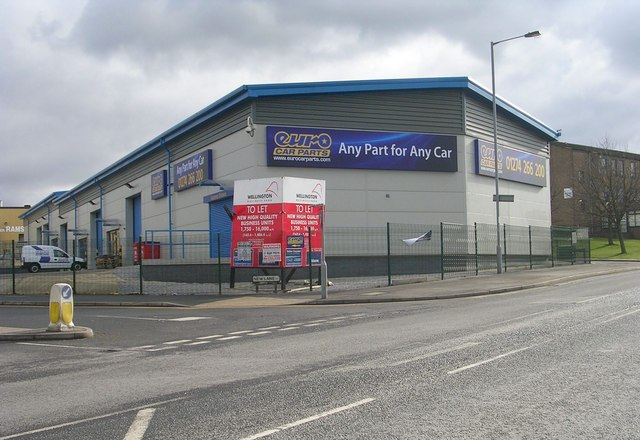
Store in Laisterdyke (2010)

The business is based in Dordon, North Warwickshire, at junction 10 off the M42 Motorway, near Tamworth. It now has 16 distribution centres in the United Kingdom, and a storage facility in Bonehill, Staffordshire. Other locations, include a 185,000 sqft. warehouse, for collision repair parts in Swadlincote.

In July 2010, the business was contracted to supply components and consumables to the RAC's fleet of roadside patrol vehicles.

== Expansion ==
In April 2013, LKQ Euro purchased Sator Holdings.

In December 2015, LKQ Euro purchased Rhiag-Inter Auto Parts Italia S.P.A.

In February 2016, IM Properties completed a 778,000 sq. ft warehouse for the business to use as their national distribution center in Tamworth, Staffordshire. The unit spans approximately 1m sqft, making it one of the largest distribution centres in the West Midlands.

In August 2016, the business purchased the Arleigh Group, a leisure industry supplier.

In October 2016, the business purchased Andrew Page out of administration, the process was delayed by a CMA investigation, but completed during December 2017.

In January 2017, the business opened its first branch in the Republic of Ireland.

In April 2017, PR Riley was purchased in the ROI taking the total number of stores in Ireland to 14.

In December 2017, LKQ Euro purchased Stahlgruber.
