= Randhir Singh of Kapurthala =

Raja of Kapurthala from 1852–1870

Sir Randhir Singh
- Raja of Kapurthala
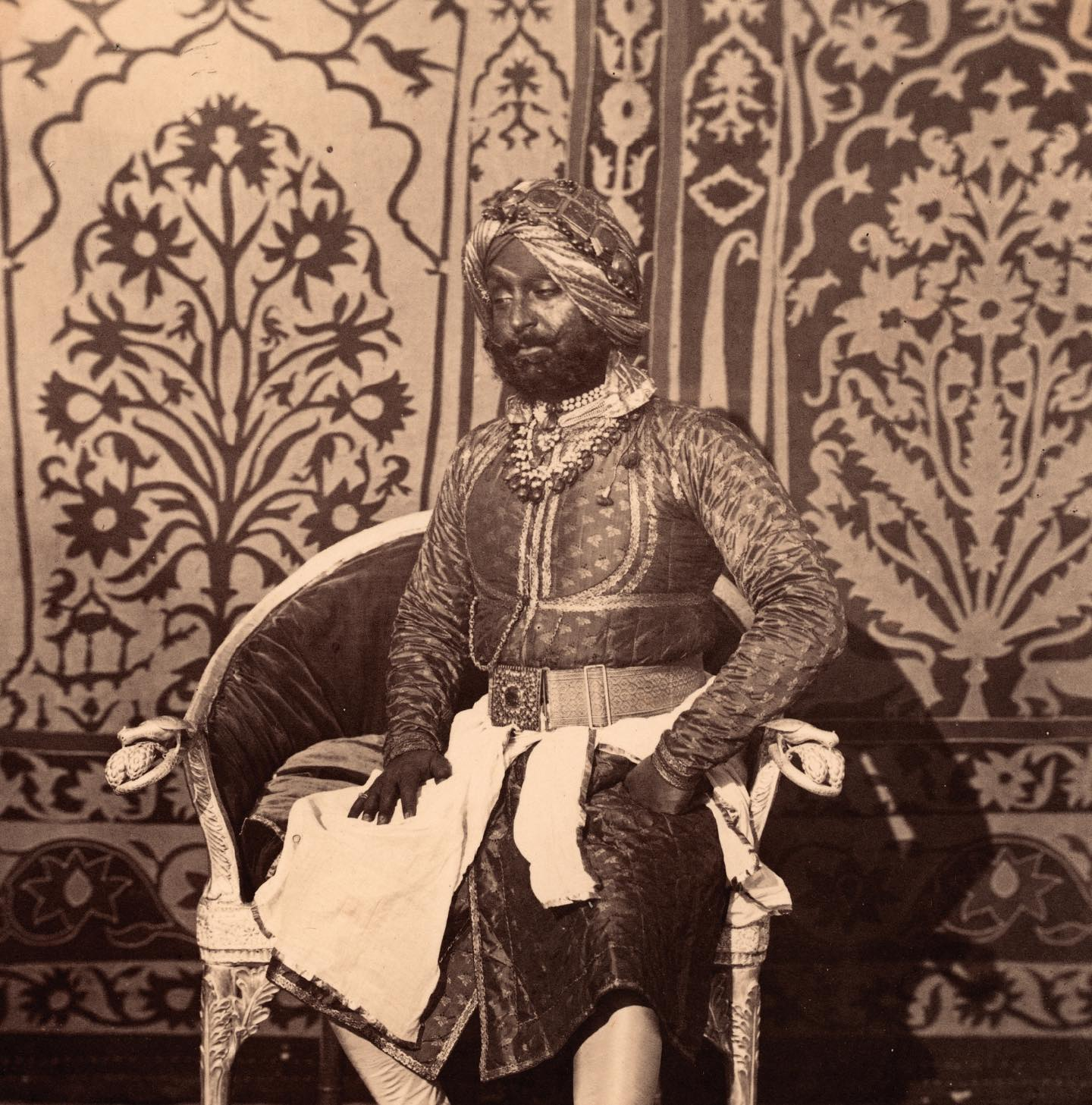
- Photograph of Raja Randhir Singh of Kapurthala State, by Jean Baptiste Oscar Malitte, ca.1860

Raja of Kapurthala
- Reign: 13 September 1852 – 2 April 1870
- Predecessor: Nihal Singh
- Successor: Kharak Singh
- Born: 26 March 1831; Kapurthala Fort, Kapurthala State, Sikh Empire
- Died: 2 April 1870 (aged 39) at sea onboard the SS Golconda, off the Gulf of Aden
- Burial: Cremated at Nashik, on the banks of the Godavari River
- Spouse: 3 wives
- Issue: 3 sons and 4 daughters
Names
- Randhir Singh Bahadur Sahib
- Dynasty: Ahluwalia dynasty
- Father: Nihal Singh Sahib Bahadur
- Mother: Pratap Kaur Sahiba
- Religion: Sikh

Sir Randhir Singh Sahib Bahadur (26 March 1831 – 2 April 1870) was the ruling Raja of the princely state of Kapurthala in British India from 1852 until his death in 1870.

== Biography ==
Randhir Singh succeeded his father Nihal Singh Sahib Bahadur as the ruler of Kapurthala on 13 September 1852. During the Indian Rebellion of 1857, Randhir Singh assisted the British, first at Jalandhar and later led a mixed force in Awadh where he fought against the rebel soldiers.

He had two sons and one daughter by his first wife, one son by his second, and three daughters by his third wife, Rajkumari Bibiji (née Henrietta Hodges and later Henrietta Melvina Oliver) (c. 1843-1893), who was the daughter of Robert Theodore Hodges, former tutor to Raja Randhir Singh when the latter was prince and heir apparent. By the late 1850s, the ruler's annual income was only one lakh rupees, so he sought to marry the daughter of a Britisher who managed his estate. Randhir married Henrietta in 1859 but the couple would divorce a decade later in 1869. After their divorce, Henrietta took their daughters to England. In 1864, Randhir Singh had invited two Christian missionaries to set themselves up in his domain to preach, making him one of the first non-Christian Indian nobles to do so.

Randhir Singh died near the Gulf of Aden on 2 April 1870 on a visit to Europe on board the SS Golconda.

== Honours ==
- Knight Grand Commander of the Order of the Star of India (GCSI) (10 December 1864).

== Family ==
His sons included Raja Kharak Singh Sahib Bahadur, who succeeded him, and Raja Harnam Singh. His notable grandchildren included Maharaja Jagatjit Singh (1872–1949), who succeeded Kharak Singh and ruled Kapurthala for 67 years; Sardar Bhagat Singh, who served as one of the few Indian justices of High Court during the British Raj; and the British translator Stuart Gilbert (1883–1969).

Randhir Singh’s daughters included Princess Melvina Rundheer Singh Ahluwalia (Melvina Kaur Sahiba; b. 1860) and Princess Helen Marion Rundheer Singh Ahluwalia (Helen Marion Kaur Sahiba; 1864–1887). A further daughter, Victoria Ahluwalia, died in infancy.

=== Sons ===
- Kharak Singh
- Harnam Singh

=== Daughters ===
- Princess Melvina R S Ahluwalia (b. 1860)
- Princess Victoria Ahluwalia (died as an infant)
- Princess Helen Marion Ahluwalia (1864–1887)

Randhir Singh of Kapurthala Ahluwalia dynasty of Kapurthala State Born: 26 March 1831 Died: 2 April 1870
Regnal titles
Preceded by Nihal Singh	Raja of Kapurthala; 1852–1870	Succeeded by Kharak Singh
