= Sukhpal Singh Ahluwalia =

British businessman

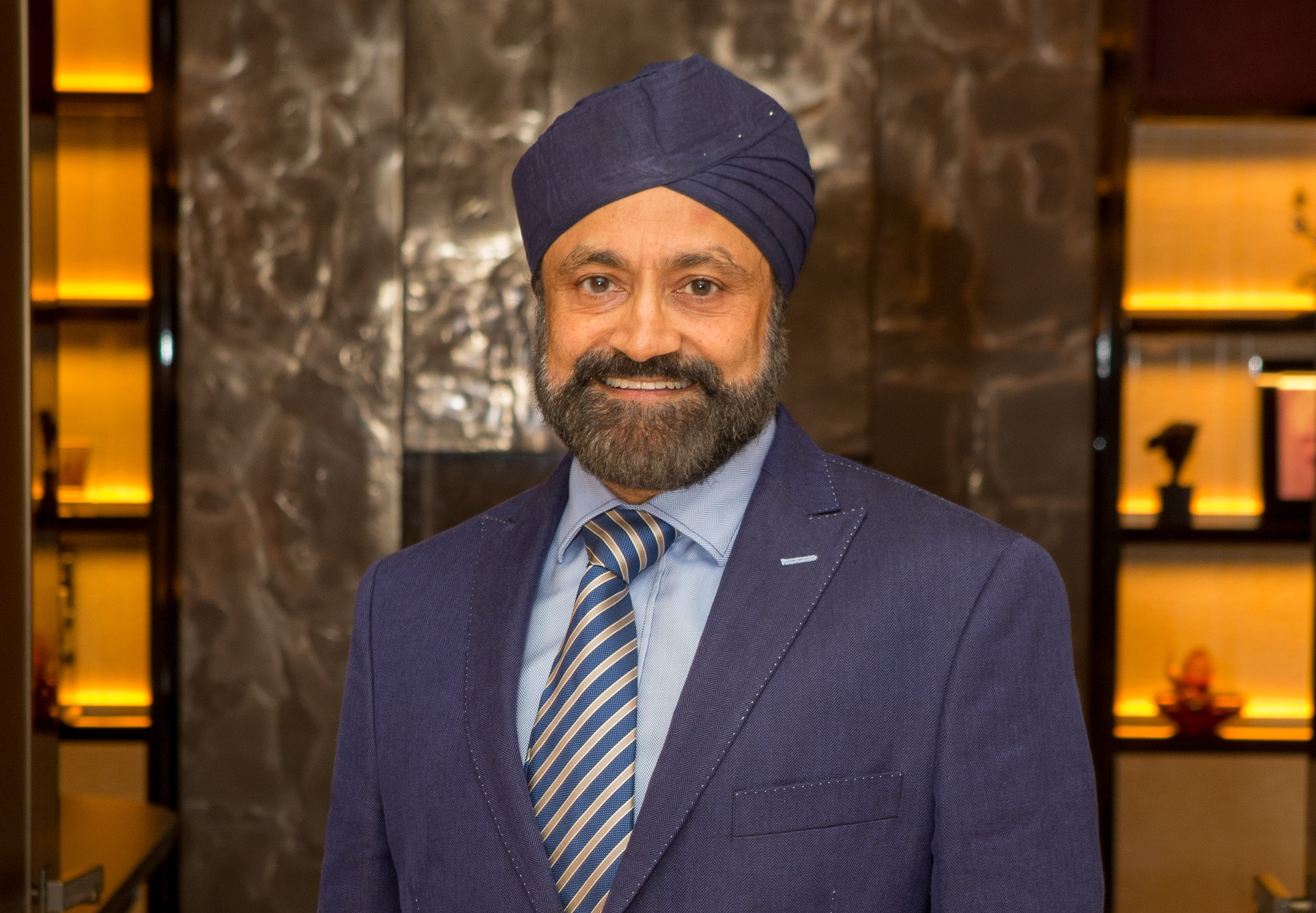
- Born: Sukhpal Singh Ahluwalia; October 1958 (age 67–68); Kampala, Uganda
- Occupations: Businessman and Entrepreneur
- Known for: Founder of Euro Car Parts; Non-Executive Chairman of Dominvs Group
- Spouse: Rani Ahluwalia
- Children: 3

Sukhpal Singh Ahluwalia (born October 1958) is a British businessman and entrepreneur based in London.

He is the founder and Non-Executive Chairman of Dominvs Group, a real estate, hospitality and asset management company. Ahluwalia also is founder and former Executive Chairman of car parts distributor Euro Car Parts.

== Early life ==
Born in Kampala, Uganda into an Indian Sikh family, Ahluwalia’s parents emigrated to the UK in 1972, when Ahluwalia was 13 years old, to escape persecution of Asians under Idi Amin. When they arrived in the UK, the family spent a year in temporary shared accommodation.

As a teenager, Ahluwalia spent time in the markets of Petticoat Lane and Liverpool Street.

== Career ==
=== Euro Car Parts ===
Ahluwalia founded Euro Car Parts in 1978 after borrowing £5,000 from his father and bank loan to buy a car parts shop in Willesden, London. The shop, originally called Highway Autos, was renamed Euro Car Parts a year later.

In 1981, Ahluwalia opened a second branch of the company in the Willesden area. The company originally supplied car parts for BMW, Mercedes, Porsche and VW vehicles. The company expanded to become a leading supplier of parts, paints and equipment for cars and light commercial vehicles in the UK.

By 2011, Euro Car Parts employed 3,500 people across 89 locations. In October 2011, Ahluwalia sold Euro Car Parts to LKQ Corporation for £280 million, with a supplementary £55 million if targets were met. After the sale, Ahluwalia became Executive Chairman of LKQ Corporation's businesses in the UK, Ireland and India, but stepped down from the board in December 2018.

== Personal life ==
He is married to Rani Ahluwalia and they have three sons who are also involved in the businesses.

As of May 2018, Ahluwalia is the fourth richest refugee in the UK. According to The Sunday Times Rich List 2019, the Ahluwalia family have a net worth of £500 million.

== Awards ==
In 2024, he won the Business Person of the Year award at the Asian Achievers Awards.
