= Inderjit Singh Walia =

Former Indian judge

The Honourable Justice Inderjit Singh Walia

Judge of Punjab and Haryana High Court
- In office 2012–2019

Inderjit Singh Walia is a former Indian judge of Punjab and Haryana High Court.

== Career ==
Walia was the district and sessions judge of Jalandhar and was elevated to Punjab and Haryana High Court in 2012. After retirement, he was appointed as the chairman of Education Tribunal of Punjab on 10 July 2020. He was appointed as the additional returning officer of National Rifle Association of India elections in 2021.

== Notable cases ==
Walia was the special-designated judge of the IC 814: The Kandahar Hijack trial. The hijacking happened in Kandahar on 24 December 1999. Trial was started in 2000 and continued for next seven years. It was held in the Central Jail for security reasons. On the filing of CBI, Walia announced the three main accused a life sentence each.

== See also ==
- Punjab and Haryana High Court
