= V. K. Ahluwalia =

Indian Army officer

Lt. Gen., Dr. V. K. Ahluwalia PVSM, AVSM, YSM, VSM
- Born: Vijay Kumar Ahluwalia
- Military career
- Allegiance: India
- Branch: Indian Army
- Rank: Lt. Gen.
- Awards: PVSM, AVSM, YSM, VSM
- Other work: Director, Centre for Land Warfare Studies

Vijay Kumar Ahluwalia, PVSM, AVSM, YSM, VSM is a retired Indian Army officer who was the Commander-in-Chief of Central Command (India). He retired in 2012 after 40 years of military service.

== Early life ==
Ahluwalia is an alumnus of National Defence Academy. He has also been trained in Sweden and is known as a pioneer of Bofor guns who raised the first Bofors battery of the Indian Army.

== Career ==
Ahluwalia's military career spans over 4 decades. On November 14, 1971, he was commissioned into the Regiment of Artillery from Indian Military Academy. During his military career, he has held various prestigious posts.

As a Major General, Ahluwalia was the Additional Director General of Military Training and was appointed to be the GOC of 14 Corps on February 25, 2008. Before retirement, he was the Lt. Gen., General Officer, Commander-in-Chief of Central command of Indian Army.

== Other posts ==
After retirement, Ahluwalia was also appointed as the Director of Centre for Land Warfare Studies.
