= Kalwar (caste) =

Indian caste

The Kalwar, Kalal or Kalar is an Indian caste historically found in Uttar Pradesh, Rajasthan, Punjab, Haryana, Jammu and Kashmir, and other parts of north and central India. The caste is traditionally associated with the distillation and selling of liquor, but around the start of the 20th century assorted Kalwar caste organisations sought to leave that trade and redefine their community through Sanskritisation process.

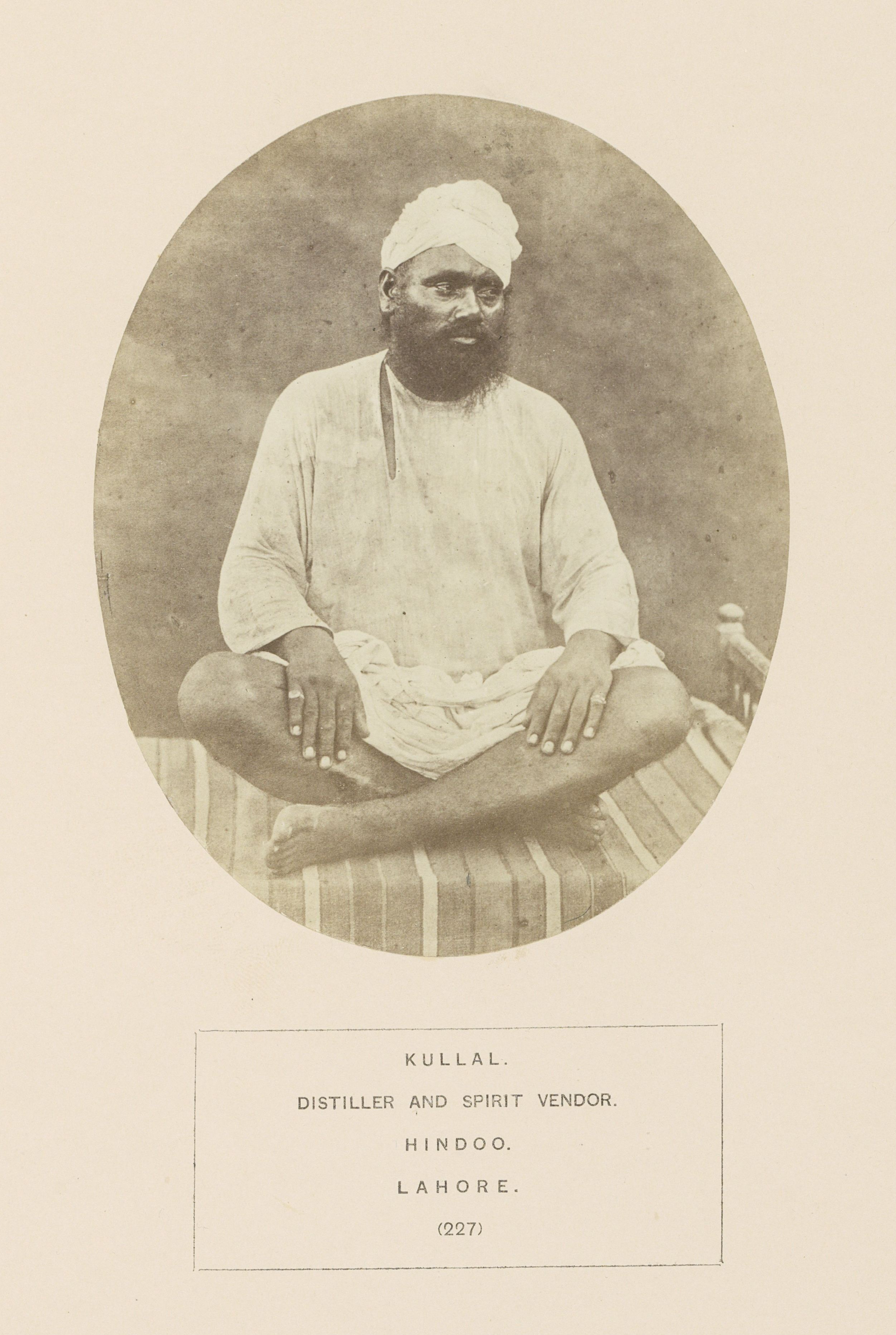
Portrait of a Lahore distiller and vendor of liquor (Kalwar, Kullal, Kalal, or Kalar), ca. 1862–72

== History ==
Because their hereditary occupation of distilling and selling liquor was considered degrading, the Kalals held a very low status in the traditional caste hierarchy of South Asia. This situation changed when the Kalal chief Jassa Singh rose to political power in the 18th century. Jassa Singh styled himself as Ahluwalia after the name of his native village, and established the ruling dynasty of the Kapurthala State.

Following Jassa Singh's rise, other Sikh Kalals also adopted Ahluwalia as the name of their caste, and started giving up their traditional occupation. The regulations imposed by the colonial British administration on manufacture and sale of liquor accelerated this process, and by the early 20th century, most Kalals had abandoned their traditional occupation. By this time, they had started claiming Khatri or Rajput origins to try and enhance their social status.

Before the advent of the British rule, the Muslim Kalals also attempted to raise their social status by adopting the Kakezai Pashtun identity. Some of these Kalal-turned-Kakezais, such as the Hoshiarpur family that ruled the Jalandhar Doab in the 1840s, further raised their status by claiming to be high-caste Shaikhs (see Shaikh Ghulam Muhy-ud-Din). Sikh Kalals also claimed Khatri or Rajput origin.

Kalwars in Allahabad were claiming to be of the Kshatriya status in the 1890s.

During the British rule, the Kalals took up a variety of occupations, including trade, agriculture, army service (especially the Ahluwalias), government service, and law.
