= Arvind Walia =

Lt. Gen. Arvind Walia
- Allegiance: India
- Branch: Military Engineer Services (India); Indian Army
- Rank: Lieutenant General
- Awards: Ati Vishisht Seva Medal

Lt. Gen. Arvind Walia, AVSM is the current Engineer-in-Chief of Indian Army.

== Early life ==
Walia graduated from the Defence Services Staff College, Wellington. He continued his education at College of Defence Management, Secunderabad. He also studied at the National Defence College in New Delhi.

== Education ==
Walia studied in Indian Army's all courses of instruction. He graduated with BE (Hons) and continued Civil Engineering from BITS Pilani. He has completed following Master's degrees-

- M.Sc. Defenese and Strategic Studies at the Madras University.
- Master of Management Studies at the Osmania University
- M.Phil. at both Osmania University & Madras University.

== Career ==
He has been working as an instructor at College of Defence Management, Secunderabad and National Defence College, Delhi. In his career, he has held various appointments including the Brigade Major of a Mountain Brigade. He was the Director in Engineer-in-Chief's Branch at Integrated Headquarters of MoD (Army). Apart from that, he was Brig Q in a Strike Corps and Chief Engineer of a Command. He was also the Chief of Staff, Southern Command.

== Personal life ==
Lt. Gen. Arvind Walia is married to Anita Walia.
