= Fateh Singh Ahluwalia =

Raja of Kapurthala from 1801–1837

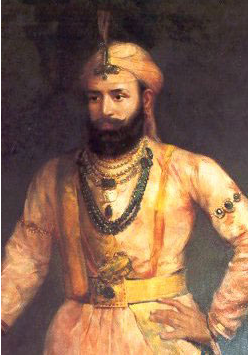
Fateh Singh Ahluwalia

Fateh Singh Ahluvalia (also spelled as Ahluwalia) (b. 1784 – d. 1837) was the ruler of the Kapurthala State between 10 July 1801 – 20 October 1837.

== Early life ==
Fateh Singh, born in 1784, took over as leader of the Ahluwalia Misl in 1801 after his father Bhag Singh Ahluwalia was killed at Phagwara. Seeking justice, Fatah Singh seized Phagwara and Banga from Chaudhri Chuhar Mal. Known for his peaceful nature, he focused on maintaining his own territories. Around this time, Ranjit Singh emerged as the most powerful Sikh sardar in Punjab, with ambitions to eliminate smaller sardars and consolidate power. Ranjit Singh set his sights on Fateh Singh Ahluwalia and sought to form an alliance.

Chaudhri Qadir Bakhsh, a trusted advisor, encouraged Fateh Singh to form a friendship with Ranjit Singh, who had demonstrated his friendship with Muslims through words and actions. In 1801, the two young leaders, Ranjit Singh and Fateh Singh, exchanged turbans, symbolizing their brotherhood, and took an oath to preserve their bond. This marked the beginning of their strategic partnership. Fateh Singh would go on to support Ranjit Singh in various Campaigns, including Kasur, Malwa, Kangra, and Multan, solidifying their alliance.

== Military campaigns ==
Fateh Singh accompanied Ranjit Singh on his first expedition to the Cis-Satluj region in 1806. The following year, Fateh Singh once again stood by Ranjit Singh's side during the second expedition. This time, Fateh Singh requested Ranjit Singh's assistance in reclaiming his territory of Naraingarh, which was under the control of Kanwar Kishan Singh of Nahan.

Dewan Mokham Chand laid siege to the fort of Naraingarh, but Kanwar Kishan Singh put up a fierce resistance. Ranjit Singh personally oversaw the siege, demonstrating his commitment to Fateh Singh's cause. Unfortunately, the battle took a toll on Ranjit Singh's forces, claiming the life of notable commander Fateh Singh Kalianwala. Tara Singh Ghaiba Dallewalia suffered serious injuries and succumbed to them on his way back. Another brave soldier and favorite of Ranjit Singh, Ram Singh, also lost his life in this campaign.

After three weeks of intense fighting, the fort finally fell, and Kanwar Kishan Singh escaped into the hills. The estate of Naraingarh yielded an annual income of Rs. 12,580, which was granted to Fatah Singh. Additionally, Ranjit Singh gifted Fateh Singh three villages belonging to Jitmal Singh of Raipur Rani, valued at Rs. 1,200 per year. Three more villages in the parganah of Ghungrana, worth Rs. 2,255, were bestowed upon Raja Bhag Singh of Jind.

Ranjit Singh's conquests continued as he subdued the powerful Ranghars of Laha, Burewala, Panjlasa, and Chechi Majra. He constructed a fort at Laha, remnants of which still stand today. Furthermore, Ranjit Singh recovered eight villages from the Raja of Patiala and granted Raikot and Jagraon to Fateh Singh, generating an annual income of Rs. 1,76,000.

Fatah Singh joined forces with him during the Kangra expedition. In 1811, Fateh Singh accompanied Ranjit Singh to Rawalpindi to meet Shah Mahmud of Kabul. Later that year, Ranjit Singh entrusted Fateh Singh, along with Jodh Singh Ramgarhia and Dewan Mokham Chand, to seize the territories of Faizullapur, also known as Singhpuria Misl, in the Jalandhar Doab. This led to Budh Singh Singhpuria seeking refuge in British territory across the Satluj river.

Fateh Singh proved his military prowess in the Battle of Haidru on July 13, 1813, fighting alongside Ranjit Singh against Fateh Khan, the Kabul Wazir, near Attock on the Indus river. He went on to participate in various campaigns against Bhimbar, Rajauri, Bahawalpur, Multan, and Mankera. Notably, Fateh Singh's contingent contributed significantly to these battles, often under his personal command and at his own expense.

Ranjit Singh forged a lasting friendship with Jodh Singh Ramgarhia, another prominent Sikh sardar, sealed by an oath on the holy Granth. Jodh Singh served Ranjit Singh faithfully until his death in 1816. However, Ranjit Singh's subsequent actions shattered Fatah Singh's trust. Accompanying Ranjit Singh, Fateh Singh witnessed the seizure of Ramgarhia states, prompting him to reject Ranjit Singh's offer to share in the spoils. Fateh Singh grew fearful of Ranjit Singh's expansionist policies, which seemed to prioritize absorption over ethics.

== Conflict with Ranjit Singh ==
In 1825, Fateh Singh initiated the construction of a summer house near Kapurthala, designed to provide respite from the scorching heat with its thick walls and an underground cell approximately eight meters deep. However, Ranjit Singh misinterpreted this construction project as an attempt to build a fort, prompting him to summon Fateh Singh to Lahore. Fateh Singh, apprehensive of Ranjit Singh's intentions, having witnessed the fate of numerous chiefs who had previously been called to Lahore, delayed his response. This hesitation led Ranjit Singh to dispatch two battalions under Anand Ram Pindari to Kapurthala in December 1825, forcing Fatah Singh to flee to his possession of Jagraon in British territory.

Following his flight, Fateh Singh sought British protection for his territories, and the Governor-General affirmed his control over villages in the Cis-Satluj region while declining to intervene in his trans-Satluj territory. The Agent Governor-General at Ludhiana intervened, advising Ranjit Singh against confiscating the Kapurthala state in the Jalandhar Doab. Consequently, Ranjit Singh recalled his troops and extended an invitation to Fateh Singh to return. Fateh Singh accepted the offer and returned to Kapurthala in 1826, retaining control over his territory in the Jalandhar Doab while relinquishing other lands west of the Beas River to Ranjit Singh.

== Death ==
Fateh Singh died in October 1837. Maharaja Ranjit Singh refrained from annexing Kapurthala due to his cautious relationship with the British. Fateh Singh's gentle nature made him vulnerable to exploitation by Ranjit Singh, who took full advantage of him. However, the timely intervention of the British Agent saved Fateh Singh from losing control over his territories.

As noted by historian Lepel Griffin, "English influence barely sufficed to save Sardar Fateh Singh." Following Fateh Singh's death, the Ahluwalia Misl transformed into the Kapurthala state, modeled after the Phulkian state.

== Gallery ==
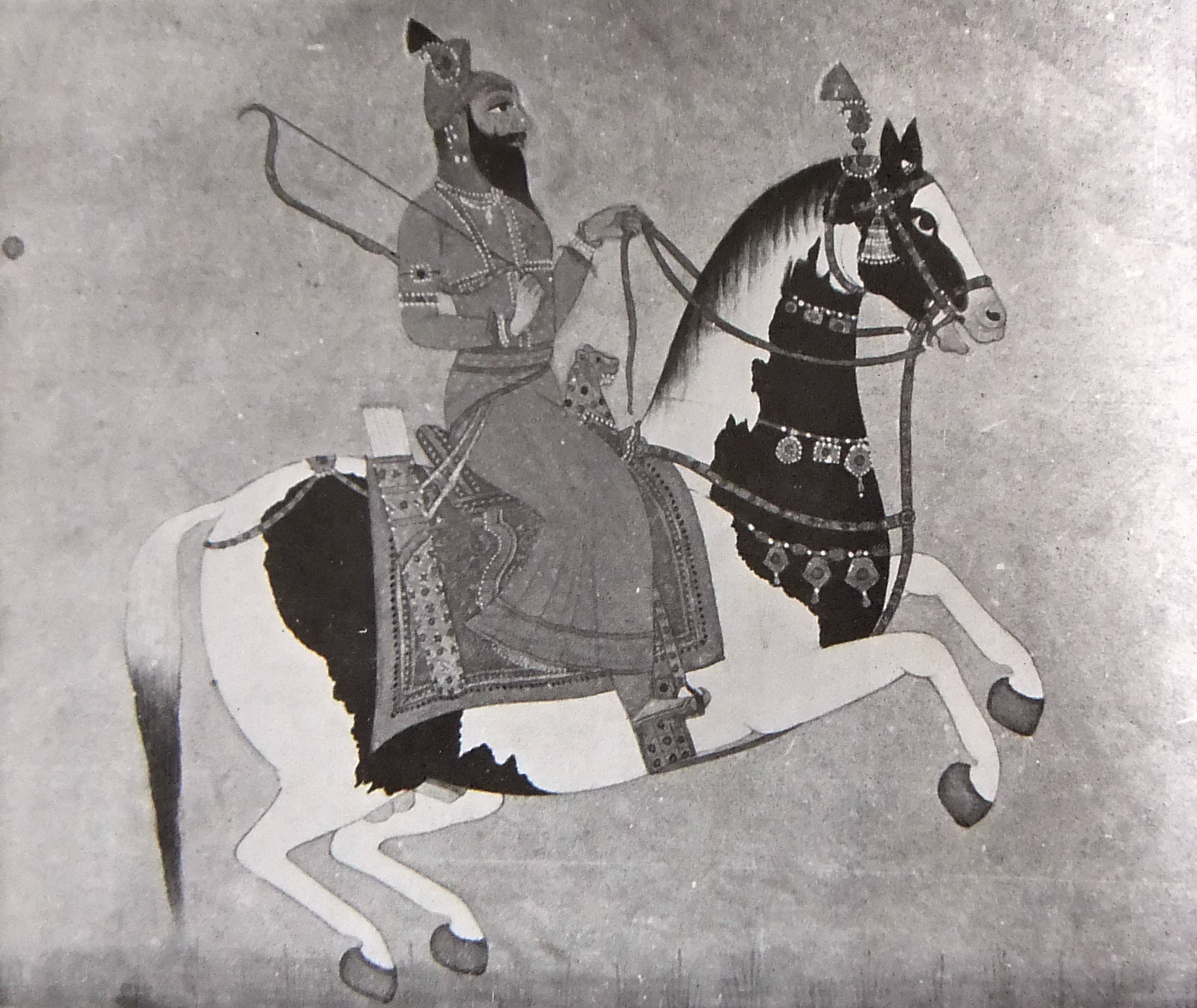
Equestrian portrait of Raja Fateh Singh Ahluwalia of Kapurthala.

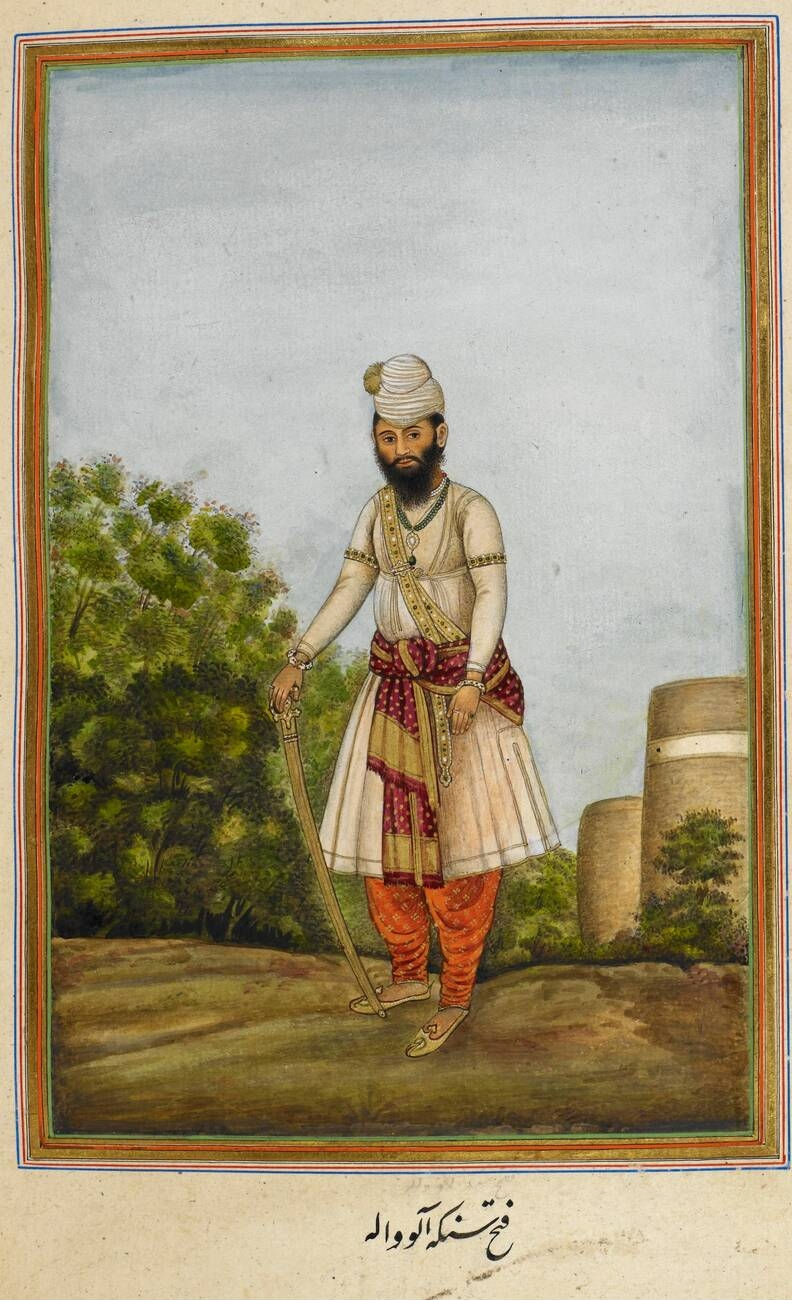
Raja Fateh Singh of Kapurthala from Tazkirat al-Umara by James Skinner (circa 1830).

== Bibliography ==
- Bhagat Singh, Maharaja Ranjit Singh and His Times. Delhi, 1990

Fateh Singh Ahluwalia Ahluwalia dynasty of Kapurthala State Born: 1784 Died: 20 October 1837
Regnal titles
Preceded by Bagh Singh Ahluwalia	Raja of Kapurthala; 10 July 1801 – 20 October 1837	Succeeded by Nihal Singh Ahluwalia
