= Harinder Jeet Walia =

Retired Air Vice Marshal of the Indian Air Force

Air Vice Marshal Harinder Jeet Walia AVSM

AOC of Advance HQ, Eastern Air Command
- In office 02 July 2012 – 31 December 2014

Military service
- Allegiance: India
- Branch/service: Indian Air Force
- Years of service: 1981-2017
- Rank: Air Vice Marshal
- Commands: Eastern Air Command
- Service Number: 16418
- Awards: Ati Vishisht Seva Medal

Air Vice Marshal Harinder Jeet Walia, AVSM, is a retired Indian official of the Indian Air Force. He was the first two-star Air Officer Commanding of advance headquarters of Eastern Air Command.

== Education ==
AVM Walia completed the 60 NAV course. He is the alumni of the Defence Service Staff College, College of Air Warfare and national defence college.

== Career ==
Walia was commissioned into air force on 11 June 1981 in the transport stream as a flight navigator. He was promoted to squadron leader on 11 June 1992. After several promotions, he was promoted to Air officer commanding of advance headquarters of Eastern Air Command (EAC). He was the first two star IAF officer to lead an advance headquarters as AOC.

In 2016, he had varied flying experience of over 5000 hours with more extensive experience in the eastern and northern commands. Before retirement he held the post of Additional Director General of National Cadet Corps Headquarters in Delhi. He retired on 31 October 2017.

== Personal life ==
His elder son Anubhav Walia was also commissioned in the air force on 11 December 2011. Times of India quoted Walia saying, "Both my sons have joined the fighter stream and for me as a father, this was the culmination of a long cherished dream and hard work" as his younger son Anuj Walia also joined the Indian Air force as a flying officer.

== Awards ==
Walia was awarded Ati Vishisht Seva Medal on the Republic Day of India in 2018.

== See also ==
- Indian Air Force
- Eastern Air Command (India)
