= Bhag Singh Ahluwalia =

Misl Leader of the Ahluwalia Misl

- Misaldar
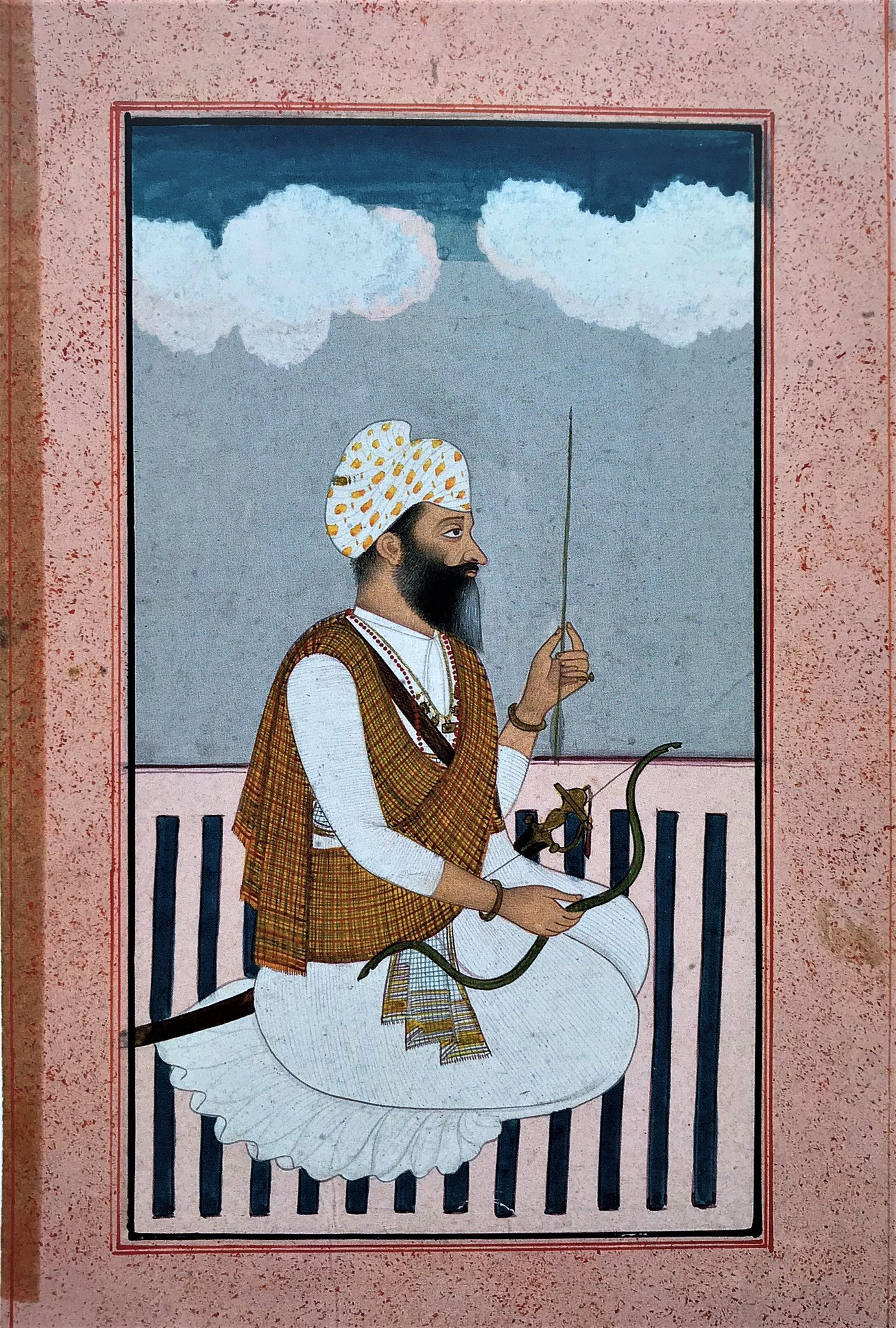

Misaldar of the Ahluwalia Misl
- Reign: November, 1783 – July 10, 1801
- Predecessor: Jassa Singh Ahluwalia
- Successor: Fateh Singh Ahluwalia
- Born: 1747
- Died: July 10, 1801 (aged 53–54); Kapurthala
- Issue: Fateh Singh Ahluwalia
- House: Kapurthala Family
- Father: Ladha Singh
- Religion: Sikhism

Bhag Singh Ahluwalia (or Bagh Singh Ahluwalia), was the chief of the Ahluwalia Misl from 1783 to 1801. He succeeded Jassa Singh Ahluwalia, following a disputed succession against Jassa Singh’s sons-in-law. Before his rule, he was a close associate and administrator under Jassa Singh Ahluwalia. He is noted for his military campaigns against the Nakkai, Bhangi, and Ramgarhia misls, as well as his alliance with Jai Singh Kanhaiya and Raja Sansar Chand of Kangra.

== Early life and rise to leadership ==
There was no male child born to Jassa Singh Ahluwalia. His two daughters were married to Mohar Singh and Mehar Singh, respectively. Raj Kaur, Jassa Singh's wife, had persuaded him to name one of their sons-in-law or her brother to replace him, but he refused as he didn't think any of them possessed the traits a monarch needed.

Jassa Singh and Diwan Burha Mai's close relative Bhag Singh had been efficiently assuming over the majority of the state's administrative responsibilities. According to Bhag Singh, the Diwan was not always honest and occasionally misused public money.

There was a disagreement about Sardar Jassa Singh Ahluwalia's succession after his death in 1783 since both of his sons-in-law claimed the role. A coalition of Sikh officials determined that Mohan Singh, his older son-in-law, should succeed him during his cremation in Kapurthala. However, Bhag Singh's supporters Jai Singh Kanaihya's involvement helped to settle the issue in his favor. Bhag Singh therefore rose to become Kapurthala's leader.

== Military campaigns ==
At the time when Hari Singh Dallewalia mastered the Chamkaur, he pushed the Sodhis family out of that place but then Bhag Singh came on the scene supporting the Sodhis, which compelled Hari Singh to evacuate Chamkaur and restoring Sodhi to their original status.

In 1784, under the complaints of the residents of Salan, the territory under Sardar Gurbakhsh Singh was taken away from him. Bhag Singh captured the Sharakpure from the Nakkais. He then joined ranks with other such leaders and came back to conquer Kasur. News of his son was in campaign, he named him Fateh Singh in victory of the birth at Kasur.

In 1785, there was a battle in Amritsar between the Bhangi Misl and Maha Singh Sukerchakia. At that time, Maha Singh was surrounded without a route of escape. In that position, Bhag Singh helped him out by allowing him to pass through his katra (locality). The Bhangis followed Maha Singh and chased him up to Majitha, 20 kilometers away. As a counter, Bhag Singh deployed his men to fight against the Bhangis, ensuring Maha Singh's safety.

Bhag Singh assisted the Kanhaiyas in retaking Batala from the Ramgarhias in 1789. Man Chand, the youngest brother of Raja Sansar Chand Katoch of Kangra, arrived to assist Jassa Singh Ramgarhia at that time. There, Bhag Singh encountered Man Chand and repelled him. In 1792, Bhag Singh undertook a pilgrimage to Jawalamukhi, where he met Raja Sansar Chand Katoch. As a symbol of their newfound brotherhood, both leaders exchanged turbans. To further cement the bond between their families, their sons, Fateh Singh Ahluwalia and Anurodh Chand, also exchanged turbans.

Following that in 1793, Bhag Singh got into a fight with Gulab Singh Bhangi, the ruler of Amritsar and the surrounding regions, whose people had executed an Ahluwalia agent in Jhubal. Satisfied with his accomplishment, he retreated to Kapurthala after occupying Jandiala and Tarn Taran without making any attempt to keep these gains.

In 1796, he also helped Rani Sada Kaur, mother-in-law of Maharaja Ranjit Singh, in her military incursion into the fort of Miani in the Jalandhar district against Jassa Singh Ramgarhia. The allied forces besieged the fort for a long period of time but suddenly a flood arrived in the Beas River which compelled both the parties to withdraw, both got heavy losses in terms of equipment during their retreat.

Raja Sansar Chand of Kangra joined the Ramgarhias in 1801, and Bhag Singh dispatched an army led by Hamir Singh to fight them. The Ahluwalias were obliterated and Hamir Singh suffered serious injuries. When Bhag Singh learned of this setback, he gathered his surviving troops and marched against his adversaries as far as Phagwara.

== Death ==
At Phagwara, Bhag Singh fought Jodh Singh Ramgarhia, Jassa Singh Ramgarhia's son. Bhag Singh had a foot injury that worsened over time after falling off his horse during the combat. As a result, he withdrew to Kapurthala, where he died on July 10, 1801.
