= Poonam Ahluwalia =

Indian social entrepreneur (1957–2019)

- Born: February 14, 1957; Jaipur, India
- Died: October 21, 2019 (aged 62)
- Children: 2

Poonam Ahluwalia (February 14, 1957 – October 21, 2019) was an Indian social entrepreneur. She was the founder and director of Youth Entrepreneurship and Sustainability (YES), an international non-profit organization, and Youth Trade, an organization promoting youth entrepreneurship, based at Babson College in Wellesley, Massachusetts.

== Early years ==
Ahluwalia was born on February 14, 1957, to a family in Jaipur, India.

== Early career ==
After receiving her M.A. in political science from Rajasthan University in Jaipur, India, Ahluwalia worked as the marketing manager of a chain of pizzerias called "Pizza King". She moved to the United States in 1985 and worked providing household help for a family in Brookline to pay for her education at Boston University. She received a master's degree in mass communications from Boston University in 1989.

Ahluwalia began working for the Hunger Project in 1984 after meeting Werner Erhard, the founder of the organization. Ahluwalia helped raise funds and awareness, and helped launch "Ending the Subjugation of Women". She organized fundraisers, including dances and walkathons.

By the late 1980s, Ahluwalia also began to work for Welfare-to-Work programs under the administration of Massachusetts Governor Michael S. Dukakis.

In 1997 Ahluwalia began to work with the Education Development Center (EDC) based in Newton, Massachusetts. With funding from USAID, she created workforce development workshops. In association with EDC, Ahluwalia ran workshops in Peru, India, and Namibia. She founded YES in 1998.

During her work with EDC, Ahluwalia also had contact with SEWA (All Indian Federation of Self-Employed Women’s Association).

== Work with YES ==
As the founder and director of YES, Ahluwalia launched a 10-year campaign in 2002 to create accessible education and opportunities for youth around the world. The initiative was launched in Alexandria, Egypt at an international summit on youth employment sponsored by the United Nations Industrial Development Organization (UNIDO). The summit was co-chaired by former president Bill Clinton, and the first lady of the Arab Republic of Egypt, Suzanne Mubarak. YES established country networks in 55 countries.

Ahluwalia organized five YES international summits and three YES regional summits. Over 400 youth employment projects were created worldwide after the summits. In 2003 she was nominated for the South Asian Woman of the Year Award by the India New England News.

YES focused on renewable energy, information and communication technology, campaigns against HIV and AIDS, rural development, and water sanitation.

== Youth Trade and later years ==
In 2012, Ahluwalia launched Youth Trade, an organization promoting entrepreneurship. Youth Trade certified over 50 entrepreneurs, who gained access to retail shelf space through trade shows. Youth Trade partnered with Whole Foods Markets and Babson College.

Ahluwalia received the 2013 India New England Woman of the Year Award. She delivered the keynote address at the 7th Annual Forum for Social Entrepreneurship. She participated in the World Economic Forum's 2013 Summit on the Global Agenda.

== Death ==
Ahluwalia lived in Lexington, Massachusetts with her husband and two children. She died on October 21, 2019, after suffering from cancer.
