= Bawa Singh Walia =

Former High Court Judge

Hon'ble Justice Bawa Singh Walia

Judge of High Court of Jammu and Kashmir
- In office 2015–2017

Judge of Punjab and Haryana High Court
- In office 2017–2023

Personal details
- Born: Jalandhar, Punjab

Bawa Singh Walia is a former Indian judge. He has served in the High Courts of Jammu and Kashmir and Ladakh and Punjab and Haryana as a judge. He also held the post of Additional Solicitor General of Punjab.

== Early life ==
Walia was born on 28 August in 1961 at Jalandhar, Punjab.

== Education ==
He completed the degree of B.A., LL.B. and became an advocate.

== Career ==
He enrolled as an advocate on September 14, 1985 and practiced on the Constitutional, Service, Criminal and Arbitration side. On the behalf of the Punjab & Haryana High Court, he conducted cases and was also appointed the Additional Advocate General of Punjab on November 1, 2012. Besides that, he was also the Legal Advisor and Retainer for various organizations including Punjab State Industrial Development Corporation.

In the High court, he was first appointed at the Punjab and Haryana High Court as an additional judge. Afterwards, he was posted as a judge at the Jammu and Kashmir High Court in 2015. Again, he was posted back to his parent High Court, the Punjab and Haryana High Court as a judge after 2017. He retired in 2023.

== See also ==
- Punjab and Haryana High Court
- High Court of Jammu and Kashmir and Ladakh
