= Gurpal Singh Ahluwalia =

Justice of Madhya Pradesh High Court

Hon'ble Justice Gurpal Singh Ahluwalia
- Official portrait

Judge of the Madhya Pradesh High Court
- Incumbent
- Assumed office 13 August 2016

Personal details
- Born: 20 February 1966 (age 60)
- Occupation: Judge
- Profession: Law

Justice Gurpal Singh Ahluwalia is a judge of the High Court of Madhya Pradesh, currently serving at the Principal Seat in Jabalpur.
