= A. J. S. Walia =

Indian retired air vice marshal and business executive

Air Vice Marshal A. J. S. Walia AVSM, VSM
- Military career
- Allegiance: India
- Branch: Indian Air Force
- Service years: 1969 - 2005
- Rank: Air Vice Marshal
- Awards: Ati Vishisht Seva Medal; Vayu Sena Medal

Air Vice Marshal Arvind Jeet Singh Walia also known as A. J. S. Walia is an aviation business executive and a former air officer of the Indian Air Force.

== Education ==
Walia is an alumnus of College of Defence Management and attended the 22nd Long Defence Management Course in 1992 as a wing commander.

== IAF career ==
Walia was commissioned into Indian Air Force on 27 December 1969. He was described as "versatile and innovative Administrative Officer who has constantly exhibited a very high degree of professionalism and administrative acumen throughout his career" in VSM awarding ceremony.

He was the Chief Administrative Officer at Tezpur and Guwahati. Under his tenure, the Stations were adjudged as "Best in Administration" of Eastern Air Command headquarters. He was also adjudged as the 1994-95's "Best Chief Administrative Officer" of the Eastern Air Command. He was also commended by the Chief of Air Staff two times in 1980 and in 1990 for his administrative services.

As an air commodore, Walia handled presentations of Air Force Day also known as the Investiture Parade. He was also involved in air force activities on national functions like Independence Day, Republic Day and Vijay Diwas.

On republic day awarding ceremony, his service years were noted as, "With his in depth knowledge, ingenuity and meticulous planning, he has ensured initiation of a vast variety of infrastructural works keeping pace with the induction of latest high technological systems for the modernization of the Air Force."

He was also credited for projects like the induction of AJTs, development of airfields at Phalodi and Deesa. He with his team successfully launched the largest ever "Capital Works Plan" of the Indian Air Force in 2003–04 with the result in providing a threshold and modernization needs of the Air Force.

== Posts held ==
- 1980s -1990's: Administrative Officer and Chief Administrative Officer, Eastern Air Command
- 14 Jun 2001 - 31 Mar 2003: As Air Commodore, Director of Organisation & Ceremonial, Air Headquarters, Delhi
- 01 Apr 2003 - 30 Apr 2005: As Air Vice Marshal, Assistant Chief of Air Staff - Works, Air Headquarters in Delhi

== Business ==
After retirement, he started his new career as a business executive. During his tenure, he worked to bring western manufacturing to India. He became the CEO of Aerostar Aviation. Then, he joined the American defense manufacturer Sikorsky Aircraft with post of managing director of India and South Asia. His work as Indian divisions director included Sikorsky Aircraft to get major defense contracts from India. He also worked to bring contracts of Indian Navy and establish Silorsky in the Indian market. He also noted that the major competitors in their bid to get Sikorsky SH-60 Seahawk project in India included the United States Navy and Lockheed Martin.

== Awards ==
As an Air Commodore, he was awarded the Vayu Sena Medal in 2002. He was awarded the Ati Vishisht Seva Medal in the republic day honours of 2005.
