= Harry Ahluwalia =

Indian film actor (born 1983)

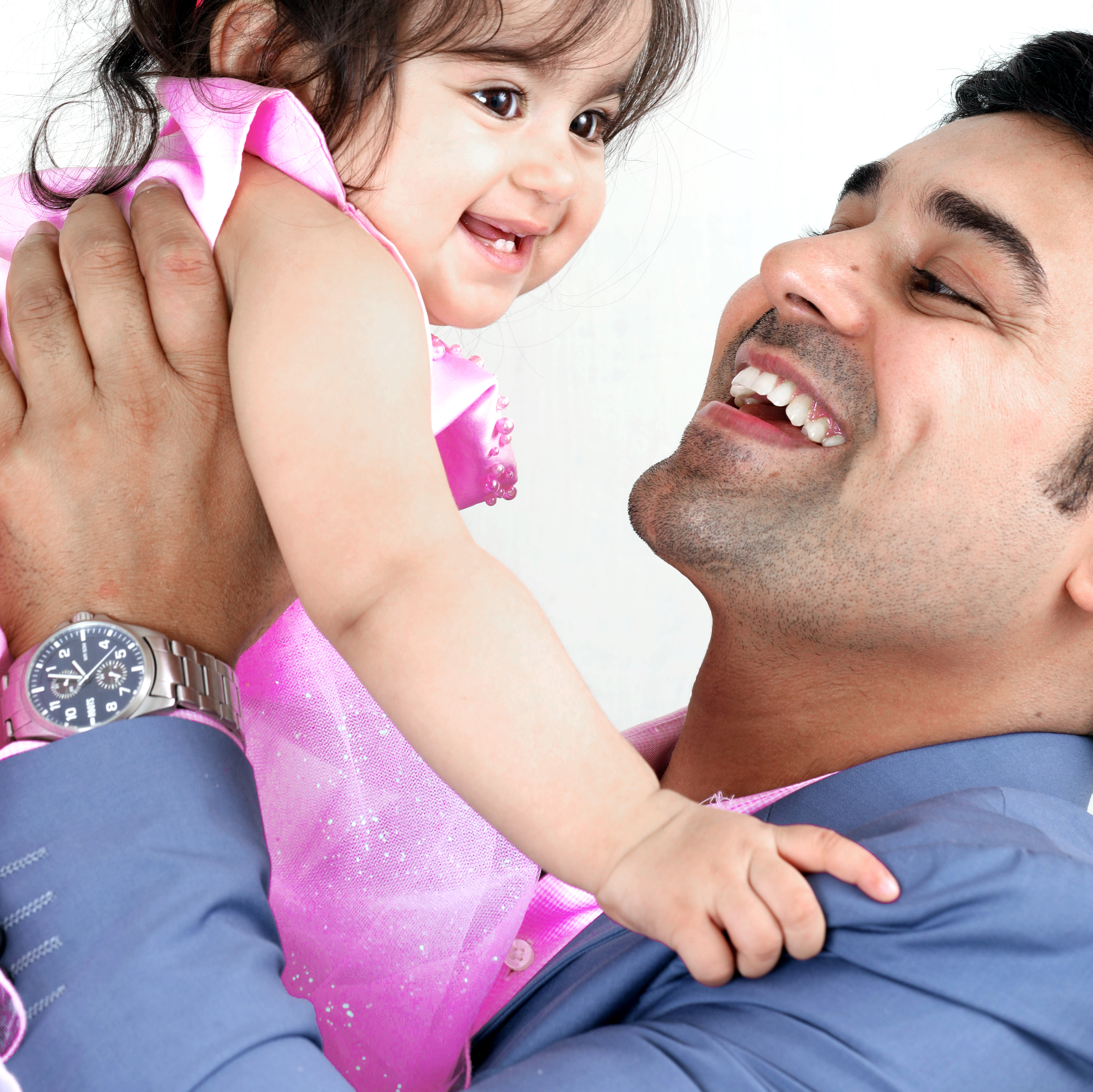
- Born: 8 February 1983 (age 43); Pathankot, Punjab, India
- Occupation: Actor

Harry Ahluwalia also known as G.Ahluwalia (born 8 February 1983) is an Indian actor. Ahluwalia made his silver screen film debut as a lead actor from Punjabi film Veeran Naal Sardari released on 17 January 2014. He started his career as a model, but turned to acting since 2006 and as his reputation grew, he got the chance to star as the leading actor in his first short film, Vadhde Kadam, directed by Munish Sharma. After that, Harry played the lead role in his second short film, Kaal Chakar, with the same director. He has been living abroad and working for an Australian production. These days he has been working with Soul Creative Australian.

== Early life ==
Harry was born in Pathankot in family where nobody had a film background. His father, Paramjit Singh, was a dairy development inspector in Punjab and his mother, Paramjit Kaur, was a house wife. Ahluwalia has an elder sister and a younger brother living in Australia. According to news papers and other sources, Ahluwalia was quite different from others even in his childhood. He didn't mix well with other kids, hated going out in public places, and always had leadership qualities which allowed him to stand out from thousands of people in a crowd.

== Filmography ==
Year	Film	Role	Director	Other notes
2019	INSEPRABLE LOVE	Samar	R Swami	(Lead actor)
2014	Veeran Naal Sardari	Inder	Harinder Gill	(Lead actor)
2012	The World of Contrasts (English Docu)	Harry	Jan Paul Roux	(Lead actor)
2009	Kaal chakar	Deep	Munish Sharma	(Lead actor)
2006	Vadhde Kadam	Aman Sandhu	Munish Sharma	(Lead actor)

== Videography ==
Year	Video	Singer	Director
2019	Sajna	Shahid Mallya	R Swami
2019	Lal Mirchi	Jawar Dildar	Sameer Shrivastava
2014	Phull	shahid malliya	Jawar Dildar
2013	Mukh Sajna Da	Sukhwinder Singh	Uttam Singh
2010	Mera Veham	Nachattar gill	Rimpy Prince
2010	Tainu Piyar	Harpeet	Munish Sharma
2010	Dukh	Kala Sangia	Munish Sharma
2007	Teri Takani	Maqsudpuri	Munish Sharma
2006	Aisi Yaad Sajjna	Sikander	Munish Sharma
2005	Ena Piyar	Harpreet	Munish Sharma
2005	Vadhde Kadam	Harpreet	Munish Sharma
