= Iloosh Ahluwalia =

Indian painter

- Education: Lawrence School, Sanawar

Iloosh Judge Ahluwalia is an Indian artist, "brand ambassador", and businesswoman.

== Life ==
Educated at the Lawrence School, Sanawar, where she began to paint in earnest, Ahluwalia married an Indian Army officer and has two daughters. In 1998 she began to sell her paintings at exhibitions in Delhi.

In the early part of her career Ahluwalia painted human figures, mostly women and children, often using only the palette knife and focussing on the eyes. She said of this preference in 2011

I first used knife about fifteen years ago and then I found it to be much more fun. You don't have to have a brush. One can paint every single detail with a knife. You can literally play with colours.

In painting figures, Ahluwalia likes to showcase the huge range of clothes worn by women around the Indian subcontinent, including traditional and tribal dress. For several years she specialized in painting pretty Indian girls, or "sohni kurhis", in oils on canvas. These often resembled the artist herself and sold well, both in India and in London, appealing to those who like art to be decorative and easy on the eye. Until 2005. Ahluwalia held at least two exhibitions a year in Delhi, and they always sold out. She also became a "Page Three" celebrity and was much photographed by the paparazzi.

On International Women's Day, 2004, Ahluwalia was among the notable Indian women artists who came together for an art festival at the Indira Gandhi National Centre for the Arts "Mud House" which was opened by Bhavna Chikhalia, Minister of Culture and Parliamentary Affairs. She exhibited a "sohni kurhi" of which Manohar Khushalani wrote that "Her brush work displayed a remarkable control on the craft and a realism which was almost photographic".

Ahluwalia has been called a "society painter", while her work has been described as "shining with optimism". She was also a "brand ambassador" for the Uppal's Orchid Hotel, a five-star hotel in Delhi, now called The Orchid, and launched her own scent called "Sohni Kurhi".

In 2005, she was diagnosed as suffering from glaucoma and advised to stop painting for the sake of her eyes. After surgery she did less new work. In 2007, a new exhibition at the India International Centre was entitled "Sea Urchins". In August 2011, after a break of four years, Ahluwalia and her daughter Malika opened a joint exhibition at the Arpana Fine Arts Gallery, near Siri Fort, called "Walking on Sunshine", when she explained her wish to celebrate the benefits of sunshine.
