= Kapurthala State =

Princely state of India

Coordinates: 31°23′N 75°23′E

- 1846–1947
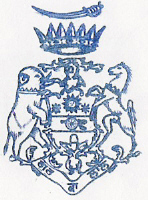
- Flag Coat of arms

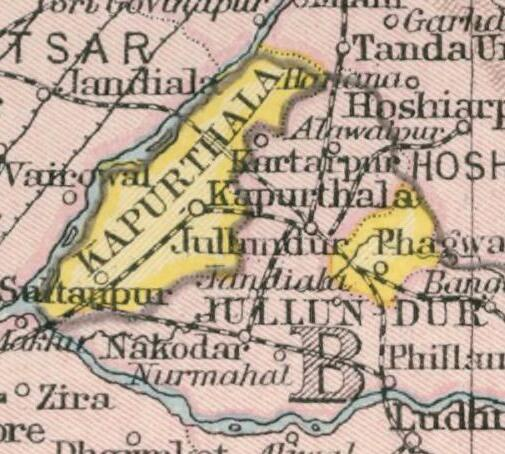
- Detail of Kapurthala State, from a map of Punjab, Delhi, and the Punjab States of British India, published in the 'Imperial Gazetteer of India' (Vol. XXVI, Atlas; 1931 revised edition; plate no. 34)
- Status: Princely State under the East India Company (1846–1857); Princely State under the British Raj (1857–1947)
- Historical era: New Imperialism
  - Established: 1846
  - Part of the Punjab States Agency: 1930
  - Accession to the Indian Union: 1947

Area
- 1901: 1,320 km^{2} (510 sq mi)

Population
  - 1901: 314,341
Preceded by	Succeeded by
Ahluwalia Misl	Patiala and East Punjab States Union
- Today part of: Punjab, India
- Kapurthala state The Imperial Gazetteer of India, 1909, v. 14, p. 408–416.

Kapurthala State was a kingdom and later princely state of the Punjab Province of British India. Ruled by Ahluwalia Sikh rulers, spread across 510 square miles (1,300 km^{2}). According to the 1901 census the state had a population of 314,341 and contained two towns and 167 villages. In 1930, Kapurthala became part of the Punjab States Agency and acceded to the Union of India in 1947.

In colonial India, Kapurthala State was known for its communal harmony, with its Sikh ruler Jagatjit Singh building the Moorish Mosque for his Muslim subjects. At the time of the Indian independence movement, the ruler of the Kapurthala State opposed the partition of India and advocated for a united, secular country.

== History ==
=== Origin ===
The Kapurthala family traced its ancestry to the ruling family of the Jaisalmer State. According to this legend, Krishna's descendant Salibahn established a kingdom in Punjab. After the Muslim conquest of Punjab, Salibahn's grandson Bhatti migrated to the Jaisalmer area, where his descendants became known as the Bhatti Rajputs. After Alauddin Khalji's conquest of Jaisalmer, some of Bhattis migrated to Punjab; others recaptured Jaisalmer, but migrated to Punjab later, after being subjugated by the Mughals. In Punjab, they mingled with the Jats, and came to be known as Jats. In the 17th century, they joined Guru Hargobind's army. Ganda Singh of this family raided Lahore, whose governor Dilawar Khan persuaded him to join the Lahore army, and assigned him the fief of Ahlu and some other villages. Ganda Singh's son Sadhu (or Sadho) Singh Kalal lived in Ahlu, and his sons married into Kalal families, because of which the family came to be known as Ahluwalia Kalal. The descendants of his son Gopal Singh Kalal, who was the grandfather of Jassa Singh Kalal, established the royal family of Kapurthala. The British administrator Lepel Griffin (1873) dismissed this account as spurious. The Sikh author Gian Singh, in his Twarikh Raj Khalsa (1894), wrote that the Ahluwalia family adopted the Kalal caste identity much before Sadhu Singh.

The ruling dynasty of Kapurthala originated in the Ahluwalia misl. The Ahluwalia misl rose to prominence under Jassa Singh Ahluwalia, who was the first person to use the name "Ahluwalia". Originally known as Jassa Singh Kalal, he styled himself as Ahluwalia after his ancestral village of Ahlu and belonged to the Kalal community. He is regarded as the founder of the Kapurthala State. The Kalals later underwent Sanskritisation and adopted the new term Ahluwalia for themselves and their low-caste origin became obscured.

=== Establishment ===
In 1774, Jassa Singh Kalal conquered Kapurthala from Rai Ibrahim Bhatti, however the town had a different unrecorded name. In December 1779, Jassa Singh embarked on a decisive campaign to assert his authority over Kapurthala. This strategic region, nestled along the left bank of the River Beas, had been under the control of Rae Ibrahim Bhatti. Rae Ibrahim's failure to pay the annual tribute of one lakh rupees, which had been overdue for some time, sparked Jassa Singh's action. Furthermore, Ibrahim's construction of 13 forts around the town, including the strategically located Rae-ka-kot near Afghan colonies, raised concerns about his growing power.

Jassa Singh had previously demonstrated his military prowess by capturing Rae-ka-kot in 1770 with the help of Murar Singh and Shaikh Karimulilah. He then appointed Chait Singh as the thanadar of the region. However, tensions escalated in 1777 when Jassa Singh's son-in-law, Mohar Singh, was killed by a gunshot from one of the forts near Kapurthala. Despite Ibrahim's apologies and claims of innocence, Jassa Singh demanded justice and eventually decided to take over Kapurthala.

Upon arriving at Kapurthala, Jassa Singh's forces clashed with Rae Ibrahim's, and the Bhatti chief retreated to the main fort. Jassa Singh set up camp at Shaikhpur village, while his cousin, Kanwar Bhag Singh, successfully captured several surrounding villages. These villages included: Andresa, Dialpur, Bholath, Bhoian, Bohal, Brahmwal, Chakoke, Dainwind, Dala, Dhaliwal, Dhilwan, Hamira, Karael, Khakhrain, Kularan, Lakhanki, Lohian, Mullanwal, Nadali, Parveznagar, Ramidi, Sidhwan, and Wadalli. Rae Ibrahim soon realized the futility of resistance and sued for peace. He sent a horse as a gift and dispatched his officials, Diwan Lahori Mal and Bora Mal, to negotiate terms.

Jassa Singh agreed to let Rae Ibrahim leave safely with his family and belongings. He also provided him with a place to live and a fixed allowance, demonstrating his magnanimity. In the end, Jassa Singh Ahluwalia would rename the city Kapurthala after his predecessor Nawab Kapur Singh, who was an influential and respected Sikh leader at the time as well as a mentor to Jassa Singh Ahluwlia, Kapurthala became the headquarters of Kanwar Bhag Singh and it would become the capital of the Ahluwalia misl. Jassa Singh continued to reside at Fatehabad, solidifying his leadership and the Ahluwalia misl's dominance in the region.

=== Subjugation ===
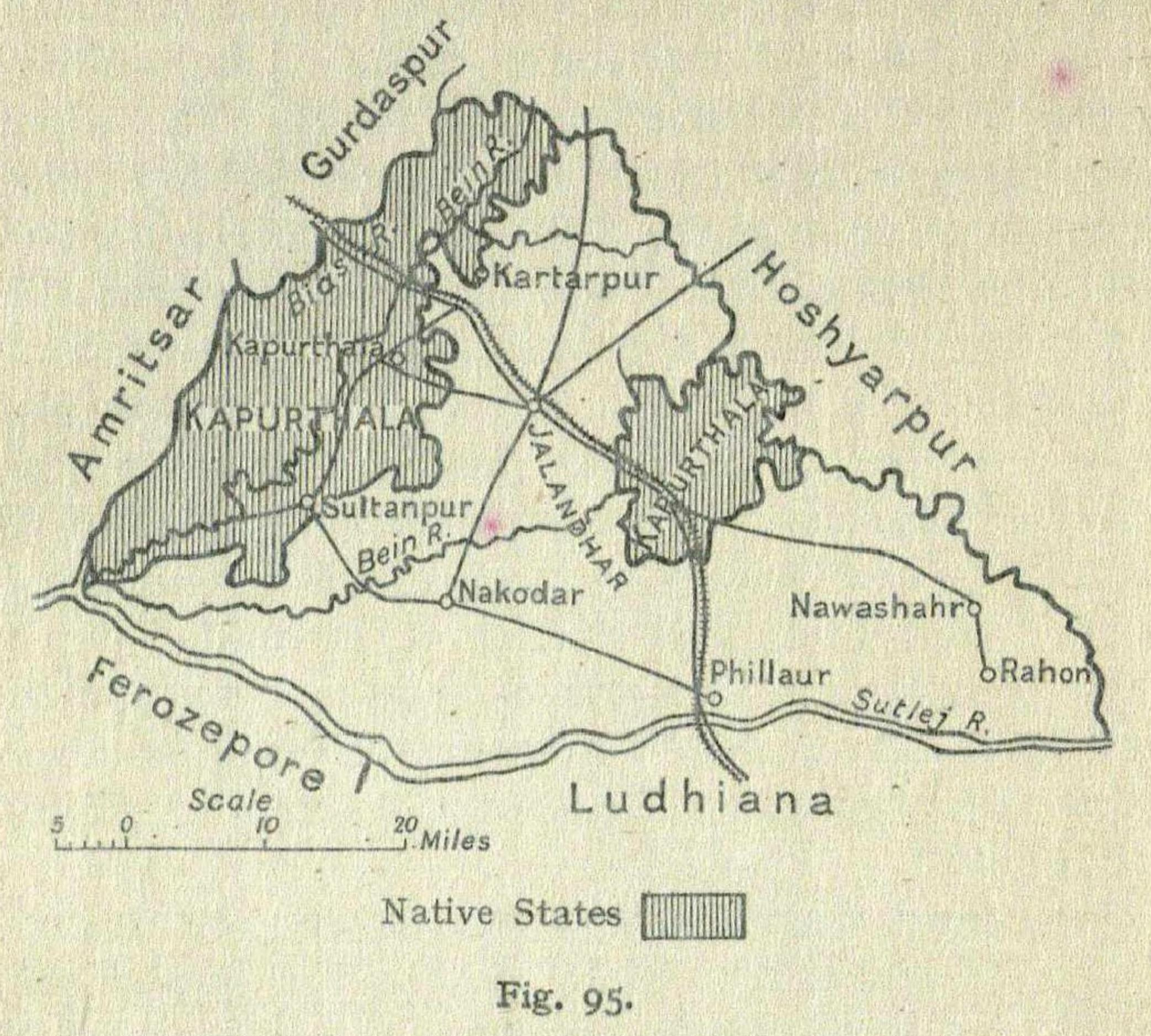
Map of Jalandhar district (including Kapurthala State) of Punjab Province, British India, published in 'The Panjab, North-West Frontier Province and Kashmir' (1916)

Even after other misls lost their territories to Ranjit Singh's Sikh Empire, the emperor permitted the descendants of Jassa Singh to retain their estates. After the British took over the Sikh territories in 1846, Jassa Singh's descendants became the ruling family of the Kapurthala State.

=== Colonial era ===
The state experienced modernization under Maharaja Jagatjit Singh. He was a Francophile who had travelled to Europe, with constructions built during his reign bearing European (especially French) influences and him getting ideas regarding development that he would put to use in the state he ruled back in India. The Kapurthala City Municipality was established in 1896 for proper urban planning and development, such as regarding sanitation, water supply, roads, and public spaces. Kapurthala had both a telegraph office and line by the early 20th century. It became connected to the Indian railway network via Kartarpur station of the North Western Railway. Buildings for visitors and guests were built (known as a sarai), such as the Victoria Sarai, Kapurthala. Universal education was provided for free (including to girls and women) via the construction of schools and colleges, such as Randhir College (est. 1856, becoming an arts college in 1897 that taught French as a subject). Three printing-presses were operating in the state, the Nawal Kishore Press, the state jail press, and the Jagatjit Press, which published two periodicals named the Kapurthala Akhbar and Kapurthala Gazette. Furthermore, hospitals were constructed that offered free medical care and vaccinations, being staffed with civil surgeons, such as the Victoria Hospital for Women and the Irwin Jubilee Memorial Hospital. Farming cooperatives were set up for agriculture in the state. Patrick Geddes was invited to the state in 1917 to assist with town planning.

== Demographics ==
Religion in Kapurthala Princely State(1941)
1. Muslims (56.5%)
2. Sikhs (23.4%)
3. Hindus (16.3%)
4. Others (3.89%)

Religious groups in Kapurthala State (British Punjab province era)
Religious group	1881		1891		1901		1911		1921		1931		1941	
Religious group	Pop.	%	Pop.	%	Pop.	%	Pop.	%	Pop.	%	Pop.	%	Pop.	%
Islam	142,974	56.6%	170,557	56.91%	178,326	56.73%	152,117	56.73%	160,457	56.44%	179,251	56.59%	213,754	56.49%
Hinduism (Note: 1931-1941: Including Ad-Dharmis)	82,900	32.82%	89,463	29.85%	93,652	29.79%	61,426	22.91%	58,412	20.55%	64,319	20.31%	61,546	16.27%
Sikhism	26,493	10.49%	39,493	13.18%	42,101	13.39%	54,275	20.24%	64,074	22.54%	72,177	22.79%	88,350	23.35%
Jainism	214	0.08%	169	0.06%	226	0.07%	205	0.08%	228	0.08%	27	0.01%	380	0.1%
Christianity	35	0.01%	8	0%	39	0.01%	107	0.04%	1,100	0.39%	983	0.31%	1,667	0.44%
Buddhism	1	0%	0	0%	3	0%	0	0%	0	0%	0	0%	0	0%
Zoroastrianism	0	0%	0	0%	4	0%	3	0%	4	0%	0	0%	6	0%
Judaism	—N/a	—N/a	0	0%	0	0%	0	0%	0	0%	0	0%	0	0%
Others	0	0%	0	0%	0	0%	0	0%	0	0%	0	0%	12,677	3.35%
Total population	252,617	100%	299,690	100%	314,351	100%	268,133	100%	284,275	100%	316,757	100%	378,380	100%
Note: British Punjab province era district borders are not an exact match in the present-day due to various bifurcations to district borders — which since created new districts — throughout the historic Punjab Province region during the post-independence era that have taken into account population increases.

== Royal dynasty ==
=== List of rulers ===
No.	Name (Birth–Death)	Portrait	Reign	Ref.
Sardars
1	Jassa Singh Ahluwalia (1718–1783)		1777 – 20 October 1783	
2	Bhag Singh Ahluwalia (1747–1801)		20 October 1783 – 10 July 1801	
Rajas
3	Fateh Singh Ahluwalia (1784–1837)		10 July 1801 – 20 October 1837	
4	Nihal Singh (1817–1852)		20 October 1837 – 13 September 1852	
5	Randhir Singh (1831–1870)		13 September 1852 – 12 March 1861	
Raja-i Rajgan
–	Randhir Singh (1831–1870)		12 March 1861 – 2 April 1870	
6	Kharak Singh (1850–1877)		2 April 1870 – 3 September 1877	
7	Jagatjit Singh (1872–1949)		3 September 1877 – 12 December 1911	
Maharajas
–	Jagatjit Singh (1872–1949)		12 December 1911 – 15 August 1947	
Titular
–	Jagatjit Singh (1872–1949)		15 August 1947 – 19 June 1949	
8	Paramjit Singh		19 June 1949 – 19 July 1955	
9	Brigadier Sukhjit Singh, MVC		19 July 1955 – 28 December 1971	

=== Crown Princes ===
- Tikka Raja Shatrujit Singh

=== Dewan / Ministers of Kapurthala State ===
- Dewan Banna Mal Gautam (Manager Of Oudh Estates of Maharaja Kapurthala)
- Dewan Mathra Dass (Private Secretary)
- Dewan Ramjas Dhir
- Dewan Acchru Mal Gautam (Revenue Minister) s/o Dewan Banna Mal
- Dewan Durga Dass Gautam
- Dewan Ambika Parshad Gautam (Accountant General)
- Dewan Mohabbat Rai
- Dewan Abdul Hamid (Prime Minister)
- Dewan Shiv Narayan Randev (Chief Secretary Of Kapurthala State)
- Sirdar Bhagat Ram Randev (Chief Judge)
- Sirdar Dwarka Dass Randev, Bar At Law S/O Dewan Shiv Narayan Randev (Assistant Manager Oudh and Last Chief Justice Of Kapurthala State)
- Dewan Hari Chand Chopra (Finance Minister)
- Dewan Saudagar Mal
- Dewan Badrinath
- Dewan Surendranath
- G.T Fisher (Chief Minister)
- Dewan Sureshwar Dass (Home Minister)
- Dewan Ajudhia Dass (Revenue Minister)
- Sirdar Suchet Singh
- Sirdar Kishan Singh
- Dewan Raj Kumar Chopra (Chief Justice)
- Dewan Jermany Dass
- Dewan Kuljass Rai

== Orders of chivalry ==
The Royal House of Kapurthala awards three orders of chivalry; these knighthoods include:

- Nishan-i-Shahi, awarded in three classes (founded by Maharaja Jagatjit Singh Bahadur in 1898)
- Nishan-i-Iftikhar, awarded in three classes (founded by Maharaja Jagatjit Singh Bahadur in 1914)
- Nishan-i-Askari, awarded in three classes (founded by Maharaja Jagatjit Singh Bahadur in 1927)

The decoration of the Nishan-i-Iftikhar includes the coat of arms of Kapurthala State.

== Gallery ==
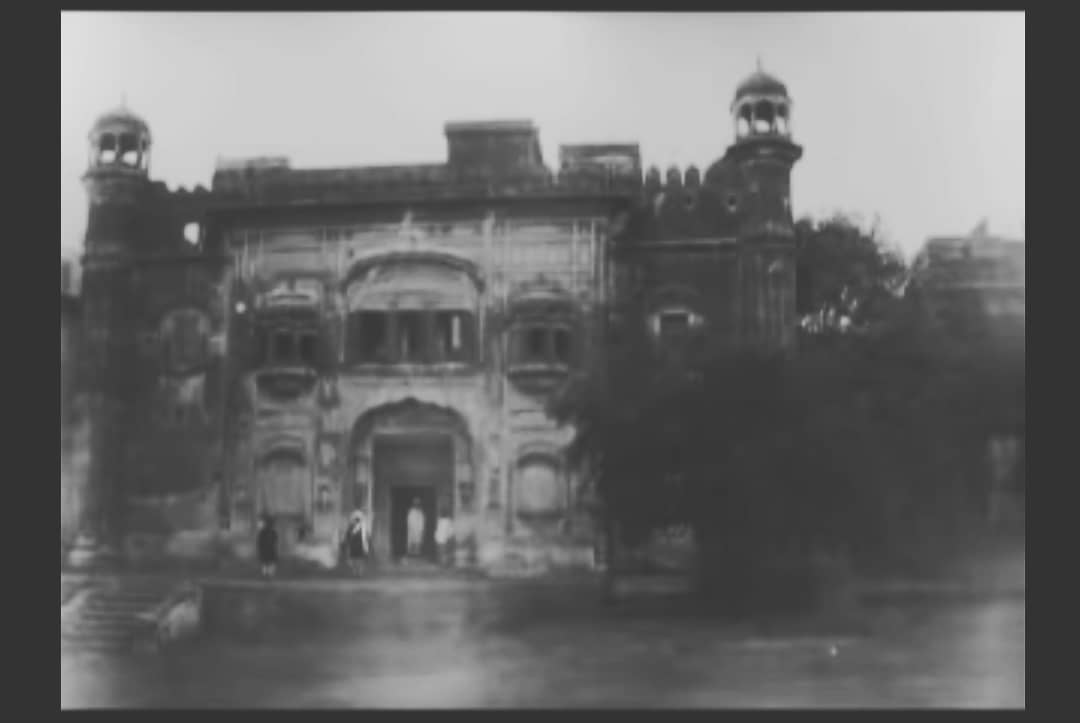
Qila Jallow Khana, Kapurthala State

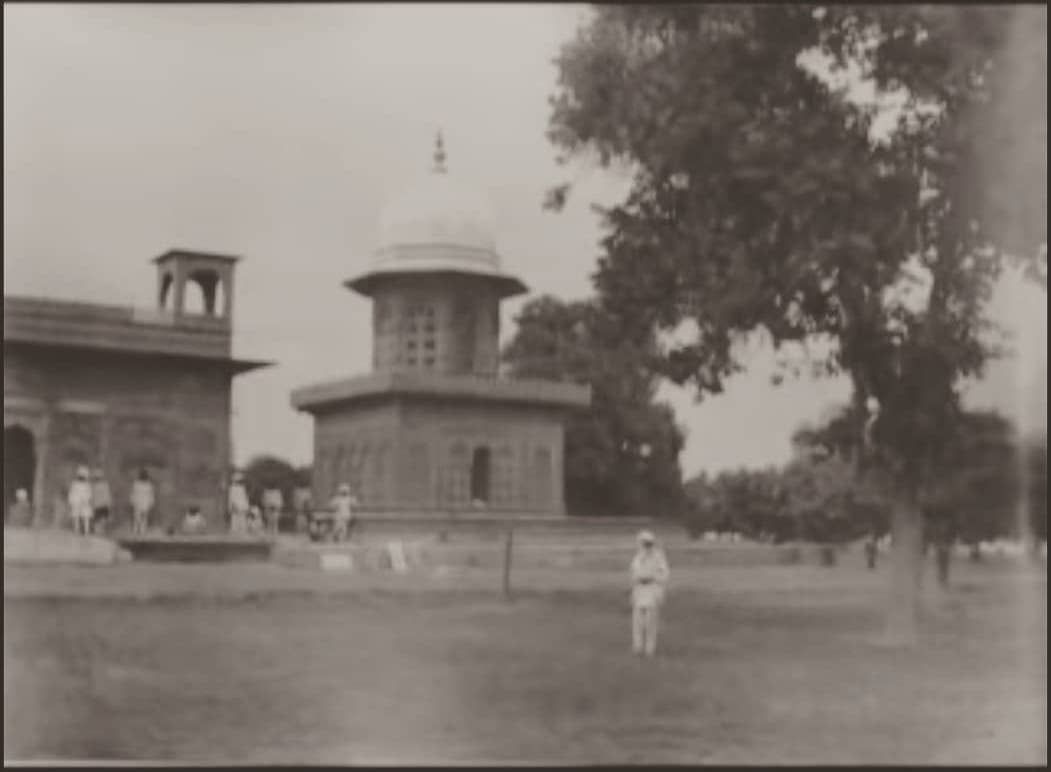
Old Baradari at Shalimar Garden, Kapurthala State

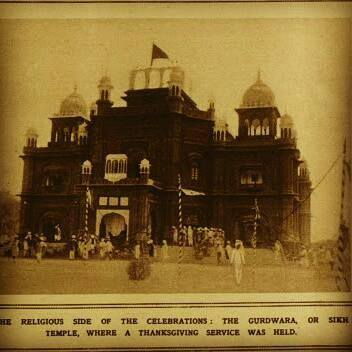
Photograph of the State Gurdwara of Kapurthala State during a thanksgiving service

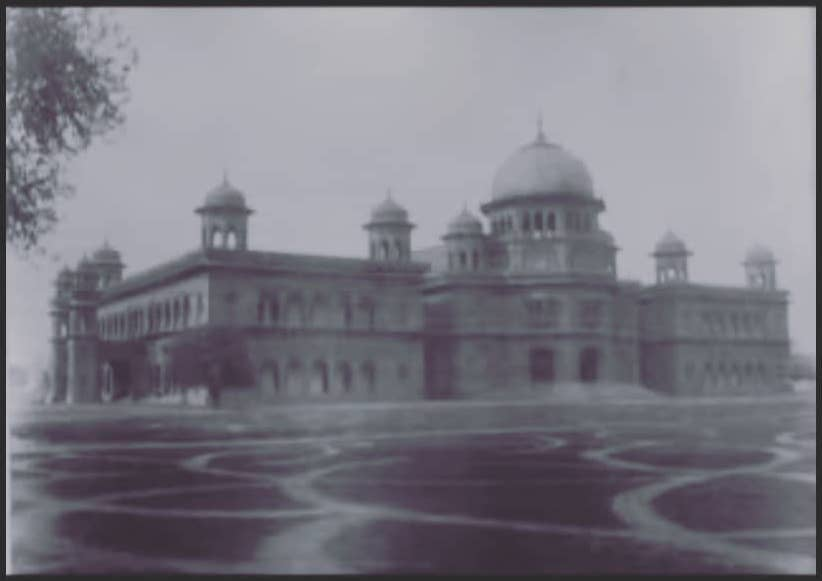
Old court complex, Kapurthala State

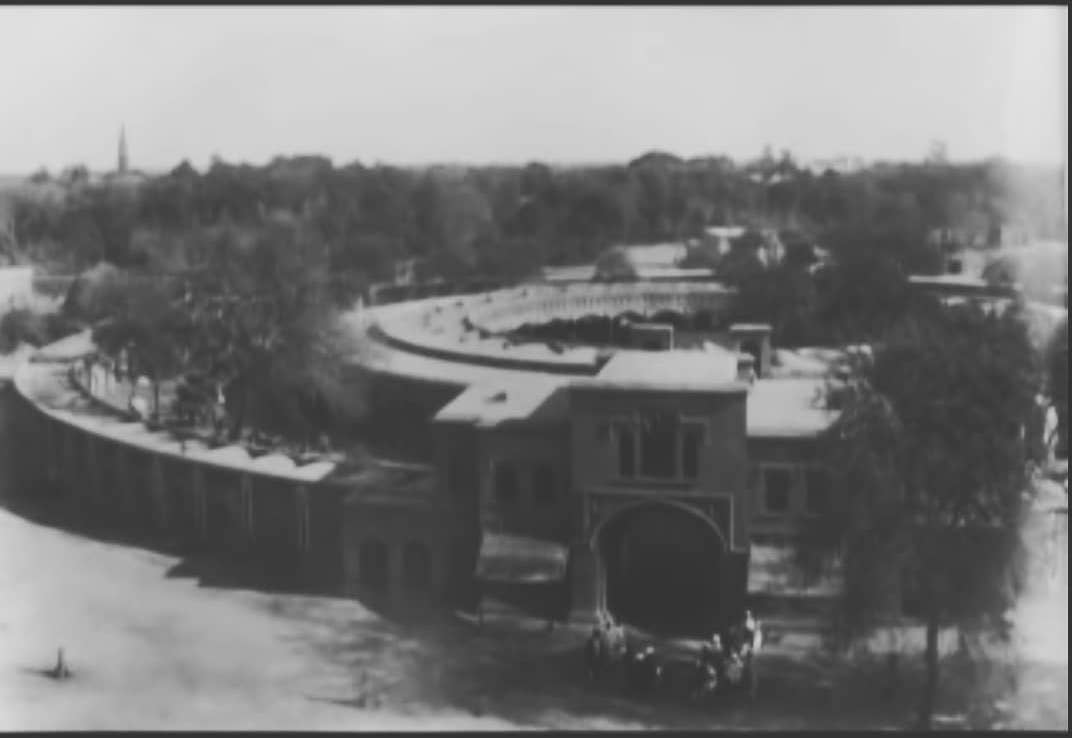
Photograph of Buggy Khana, Kapurthala State

== See also ==
- Anita Delgado
- Political integration of India
- Kapurthala Estates (Oudh)
