= Paintal =

Paintal is an Indian surname. "Paintal" (Gotra) is a surname of Ahluwalias amongst Sikhs. This surname is native to Punjab. Persons having this surname include:

== Notable people ==
- Paintal (comedian) (born 1948), Indian comedian
- Autar Singh Paintal (1925–2004), Indian scientist
- Gufi Paintal (1944–2023), Indian actor
- Hiten Paintal (born 1978), Indian actor
- Priti Paintal (born 1960), Indian composer, performer, music producer and promoter in England

== See also ==
- Ahluwalia (surname)
- Bimbet
- Pental (disambiguation)
- Sikand
