= Ahluwalia (caste) =

Indian caste

Ahluwalia (also transliterated as Ahluvalia) is an Indian caste native to the Punjab region. Originally of a low-caste Kalal background, they adopted the new name Ahluwalia after Jassa Singh Ahluwalia through a process of Sanskritisation to achieve upper social mobility.

== History ==
The Ahluwalias originally belonged to the Kalal caste, whose traditional occupation was brewing country liquor. The Kalals held a low status in the traditional caste hierarchy, close to the outcastes. In the 18th century, the Sikh chief Jassa Singh Ahluwalia, who belonged to the Kalal caste, adopted the surname "Ahluwalia" after the name of his ancestral village. His descendants became the ruling dynasty of the Kapurthala State. In the late 19th century, other Kalals also adopted the Ahluwalia identity, as part of a Sanskritisation process to improve their social status, resulting in the formation of the Ahluwalia caste. They gave up their traditional occupations, as they gained political power and as the colonial British administration started regulating distribution and sale of liquor. This attempt was successful, and the Ahluwalias came to be considered equal to the high-ranked Khatris in the caste hierarchy. The Kalals took up new occupations, and in particular, a large number of Ahluwalias served in the army.

Some of the Ahluwalias further tried to enhance their social status by claiming Khatri or Rajput descent. For example, a legendary account traces the ancestry of the Kapurthala royal family to the Bhatti Rajput royal family of Jaisalmer (and ultimately to Krishna through Salibahan). According to this narrative, a group of Bhattis migrated to Punjab, where they came to be known as Jats, and became Sikhs. The account states that Sadho Singh and his four sons married into Kalal families, because of which the family came to be known as Ahluwalia. Lepel Griffin (1873), a British administrator who wrote on the history of Punjab's rulers, dismissed this account connecting the Ahluwalias to the Jaisalmer royal family as spurious. The Sikh author Gian Singh, in his Twarikh Raj Khalsa (1894), noted that the Ahluwalia family had adopted the Kalal caste identity much before Sadho Singh.

Most of the Ahluwalias follow either Sikhism or Hinduism.
