= Ahluwalia (misl) =

Sovereign state in the Sikh Confederacy of Punjab

Ahluwalia Misl
- 1774–1846
- Status: Part of the Sikh Confederacy (1774–1801); Under the Sikh Empire (1801–1846)
- Capital: Kapurthala
- Common languages: Punjabi
- Religion: Islam(Majority); Sikhism(State Religion); Hinduism
- Government: Misl
- Sardar
  - 1777-1783: Jassa Singh Ahluwalia
  - 1837-1852: Nihal Singh
- History
  - Capture of Kapurthala from Rai Ibrahim Bhatti: 1774
  - Subsidiary alliance signed with the East India Company: 1846
Preceded by	Succeeded by
Rai Ibrahim Bhatti's Jagir	Kapurthala state
- Today part of: India; Punjab

Ahluwalia (also transliterated as Ahluvalia) was a misl, that is, a sovereign state in the Sikh Confederacy of Punjab region in present-day India and Pakistan. The misl's name is derived from Ahlu, the ancestral village of the misl leaders. The Ahluwalia misl was one of the 12 major Sikh misls, and held land to the north of Sutlej river.

== History ==
=== Origins ===
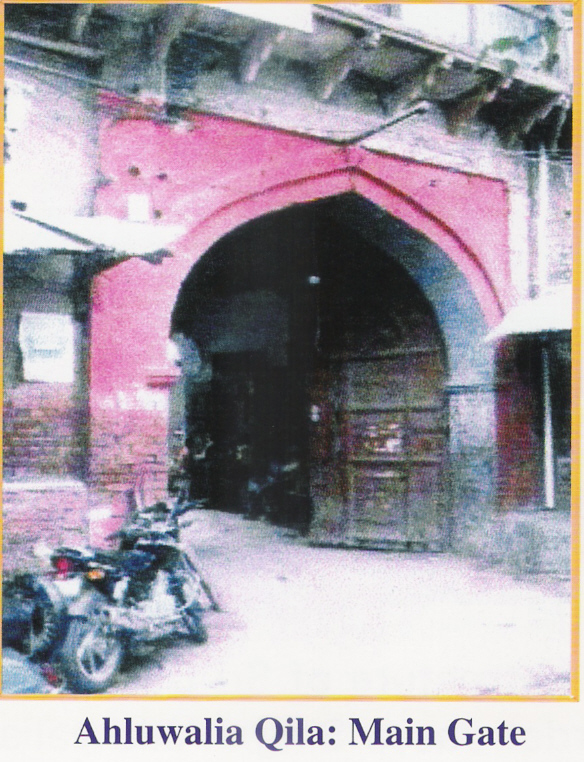
Ahluwalia Fort

Different scholars variously name the misl's founder as Sadho Singh, his descendant Bagh Singh, or Bagh Singh's nephew Jassa Singh Ahluwalia. The misl was founded by Kalals, who claimed descent from Jats.

The misl rose to prominence under Jassa Singh, who was the first person to use the name "Ahluwalia". Originally known as Jassa Singh Kalal, he styled himself as Ahluwalia after his ancestral village of Ahlu near Lahore. In 1774, Kapurthala was captured from Rai Ibrahim Bhatti.

=== Conflict with Sikh Empire ===
In 1825, Raja Fateh Singh initiated the construction of a summer house near Kapurthala, designed to provide respite from the scorching heat with its thick walls and an underground cell approximately eight meters deep. However, Ranjit Singh misinterpreted this construction project as an attempt to build a fort, prompting him to summon Fateh Singh to Lahore. Fateh Singh, apprehensive of Ranjit Singh's intentions, having witnessed the fate of numerous chiefs who had previously been called to Lahore, delayed his response. This hesitation led Ranjit Singh to dispatch two battalions under Anand Ram Pindari to Kapurthala in December 1825, forcing Fatah Singh to flee to his possession of Jagraon in British territory.

Following his flight, Fateh Singh sought British protection for his territories, and the Governor-General affirmed his control over villages in the Cis-Satluj region while declining to intervene in his trans-Satluj territory. The Agent Governor-General at Ludhiana intervened, advising Ranjit Singh against confiscating the Kapurthala state in the Jalandhar Doab. Consequently, Ranjit Singh recalled his troops and extended an invitation to Fateh Singh to return. Fateh Singh accepted the offer and returned to Kapurthala in 1826, retaining control over his territory in the Jalandhar Doab while relinquishing other lands west of the Beas River to Ranjit Singh.

=== Princely state ===
After the East India Company took over the Sikh territories following the First Anglo-Sikh War of 1846, the Ahluwalia Misl transformed into the Kapurthala State.

== Territory ==
The misl originated from Ahlu village near Lahore. The Ahluwalias held territory in the Bist-Jalandhar and accepted tribute from chiefs of Malwa, the Punjab Hills, the Gangetic Plains, Rajasthan, and the Upper Bari Doab. The Ahluwalia Misl controlled areas on the left-bank of the Sutlej river.

== Dynasty ==
=== Ahluwalia Misl ===
==== Sardars ====
- Jassa Singh (1777 – 20 October 1783) (b. 1718 – d. 1783)
- Bhag Singh Ahluwalia (20 October 1783 – 10 July 1801) (b. 1747 – d. 1801)

==== Rajas ====
- Fateh Singh Ahluwalia (10 July 1801 – 20 October 1837) (b. 1784 – d. 1837)
- Nihal Singh (20 October 1837 – 1846) (b. 1817 – d. 1852)

=== Kapurthala State ===
==== Rajas ====
- Nihal Singh (1846 – 13 September 1852) (b. 1817 – d. 1852)
- Randhir Singh (13 September 1852 – 12 March 1861) (b. 1831 – d. 1870)

==== Raja-i Rajgan ====
- Randhir Singh (12 March 1861 – 2 April 1870) (b. 1831 – d. 1870)
- Kharak Singh (2 April 1870 – 3 September 1877) (b. 1850 – d. 1877)
- Jagatjit Singh (3 September 1877 – 12 December 1911) (b. 1872 – d. 1949)

==== Maharajas ====
- Jagatjit Singh (12 December 1911 – 15 August 1947) (b. 1872 – d. 1949)
- Paramjit Singh (b. 1892 - d. 1955)
- Brigadier Sukhjit Singh, MVC(b. 1934)

==== Crown Prince ====
- Tikka Raja Shatrujit Singh (b. 1961)

== Gallery ==
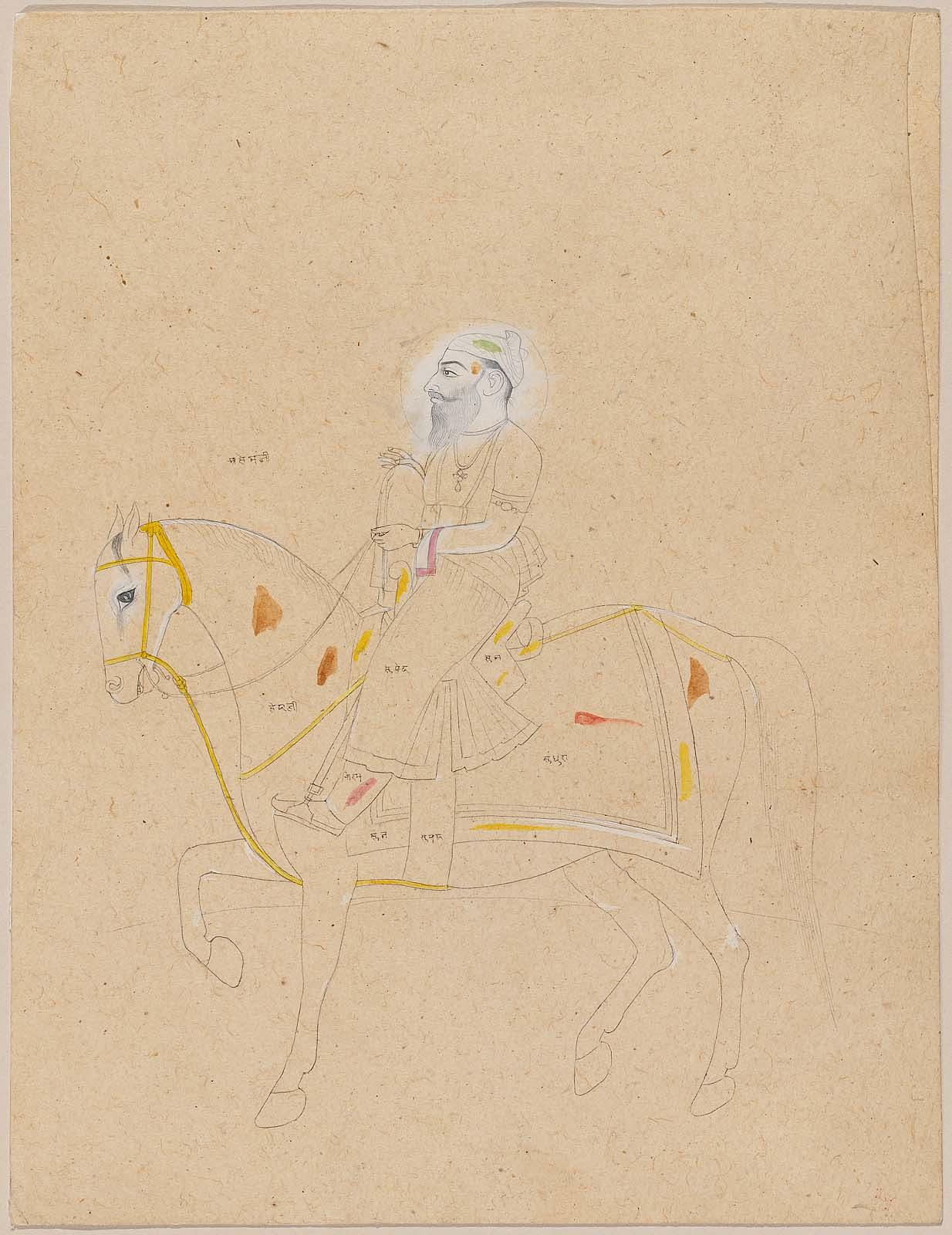
Equestrian painting of Jassa Singh Ahluwalia, Punjab Plains, circa 1850

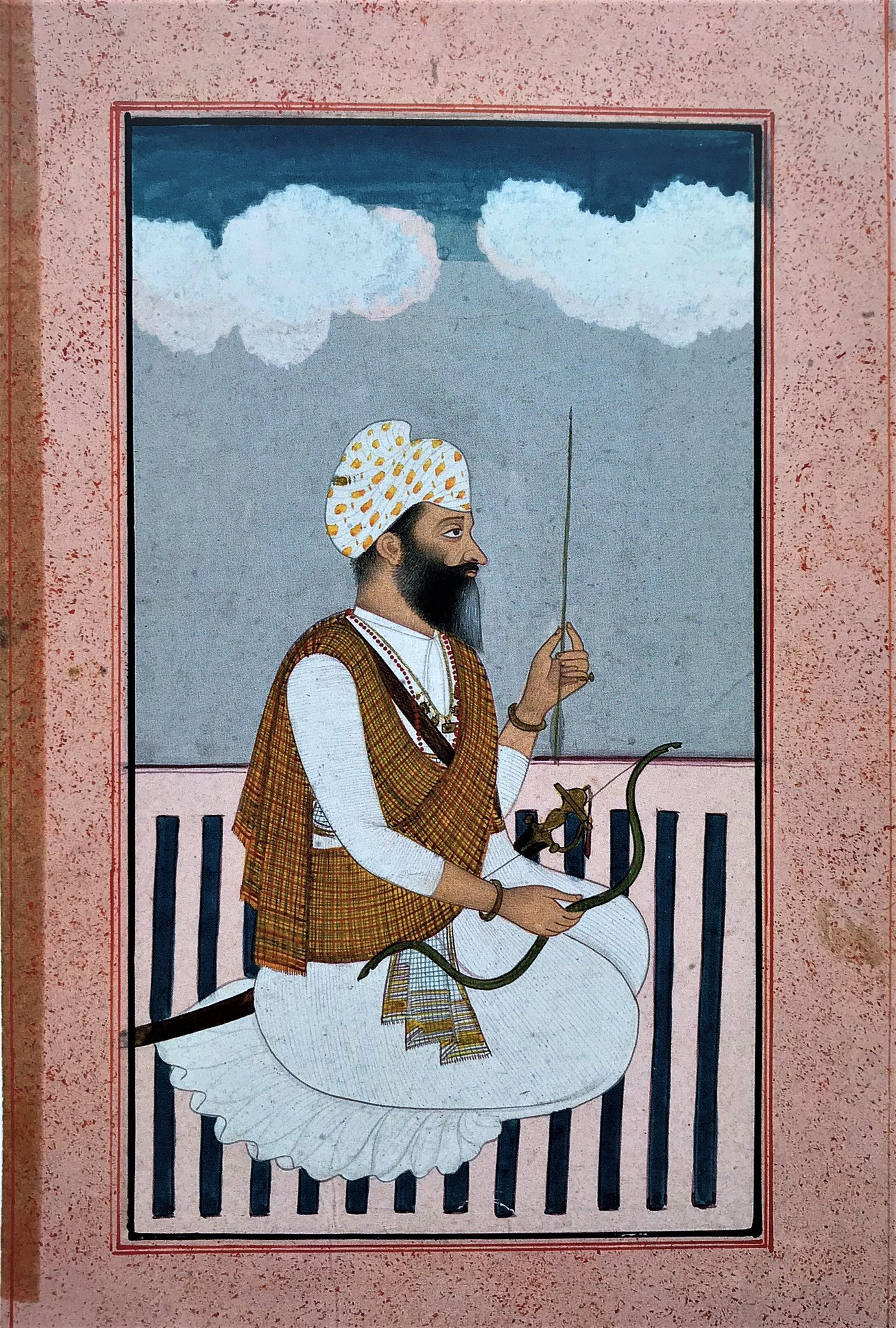
Miniature painting of Bhag Singh Ahluwalia, ca.1785

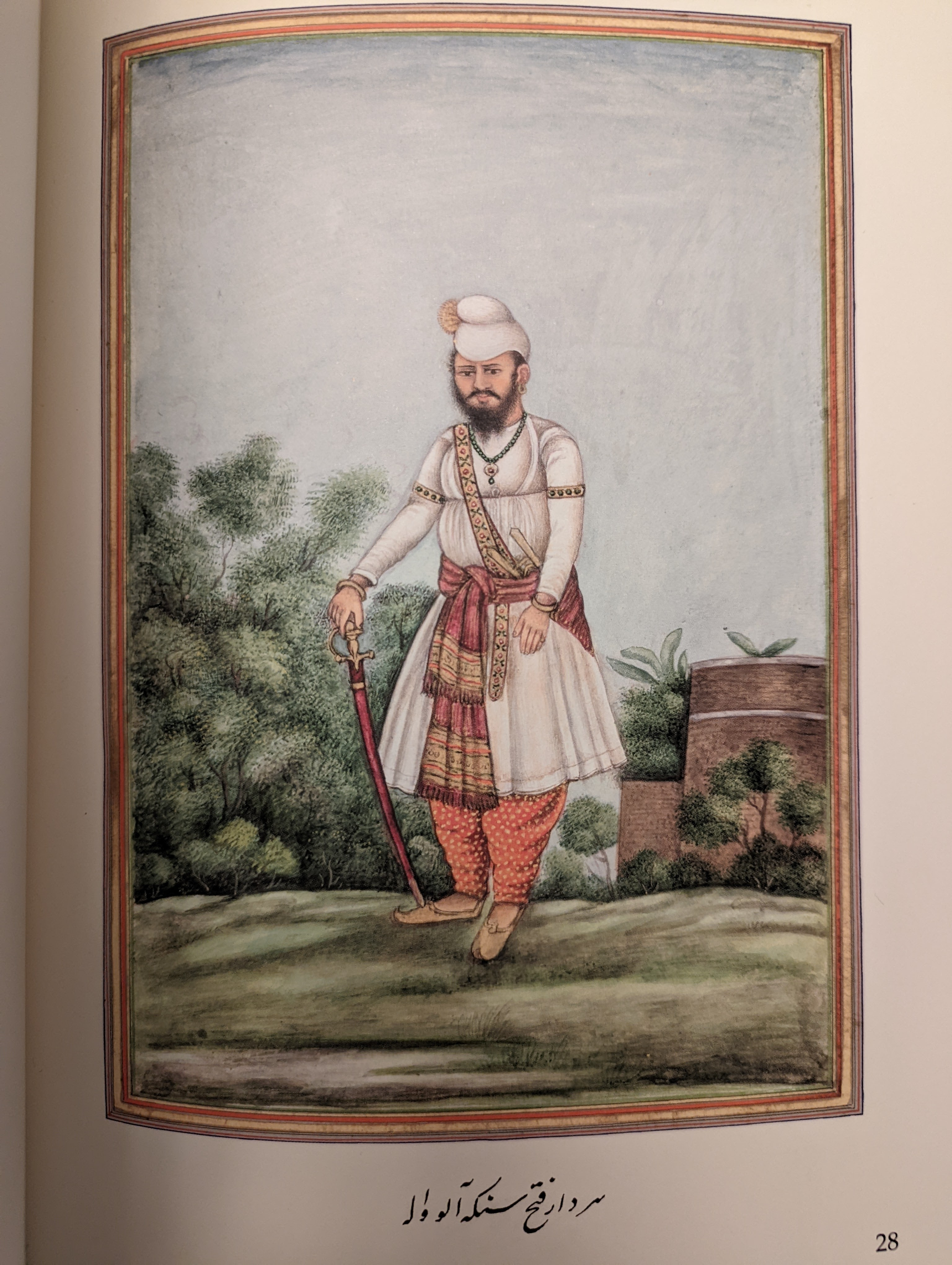
Painting of Raja Fateh Singh Ahluwalia

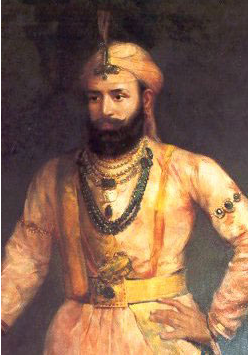
Raja Fateh Singh Ahluwalia, CIE

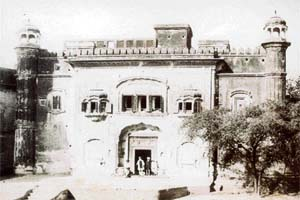
Photograph of Jassa Singh Ahluwalia's haveli
