= Sita Devi of Kapurthala =

Kapurthalian royal

Princess Sita Devi
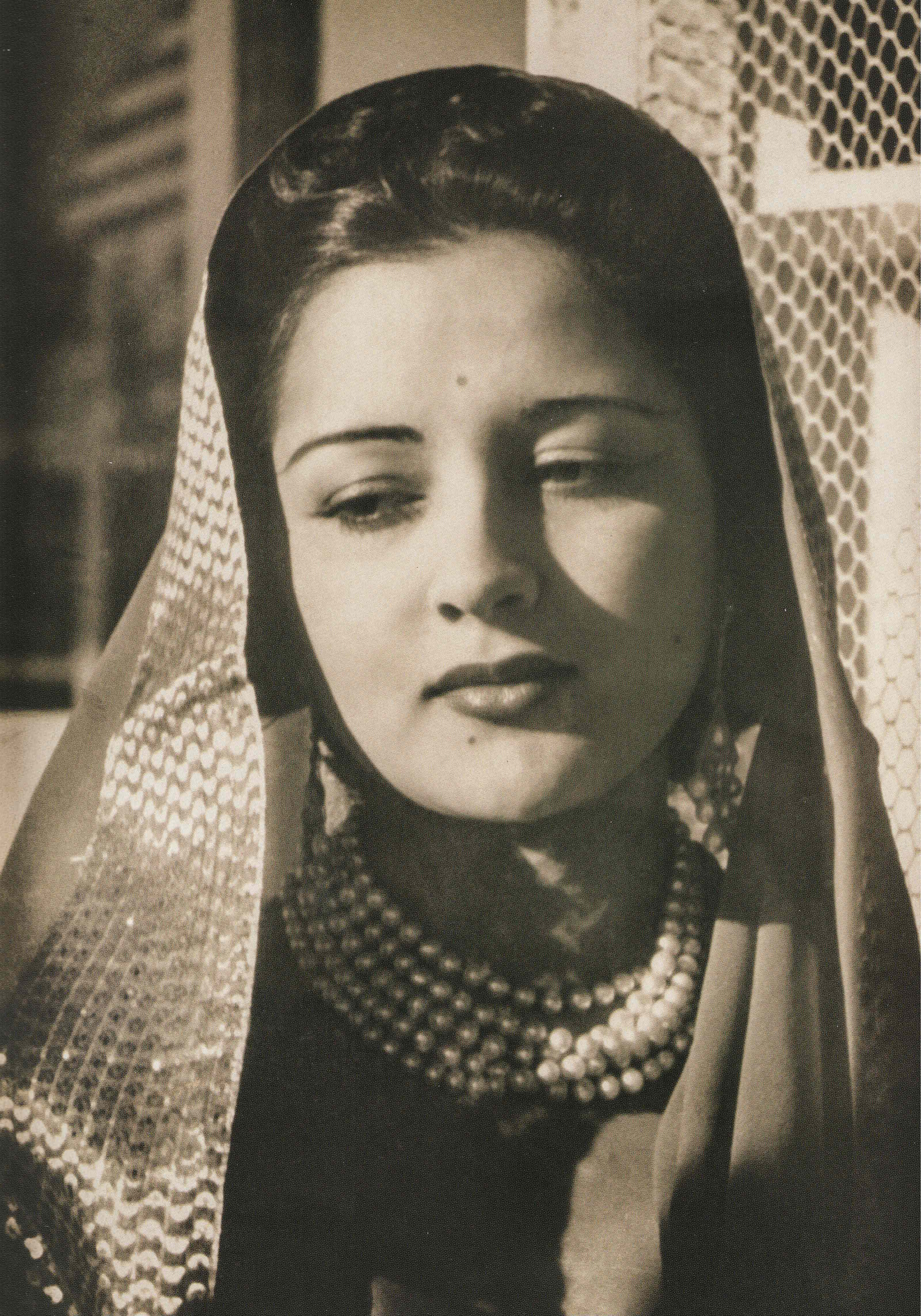
- Princess Sita Devi (mid-1930s)
- Born: 30 September 1915
- Died: 2002 (aged 86–87)
- Spouse: Prince Karamjit Singh of Kapurthala (m. 1928 - 1967; his death)
- Issue: Prince Arun Singh; Prince Martand Singh
- Father: Udai Raj Singh I, Prince of Kashipur
- Mother: Princess Devi of Bashahr

Princess Sita Devi, Princess Karamjit Singh of Kapurthala (30 September 1915 − 2002), also known as Princess Karam and the Pearl of India, was the wife of Prince Karamjit Singh, a younger son of King Jagatjit Singh I of Kapurthala in Punjab, British India. In 1944, she was awarded the Empire of India Medal for her work in raising funds for Indian soldiers in the Second World War.

She was widely regarded as one of the most glamorous women of her day.

== Early life and education ==
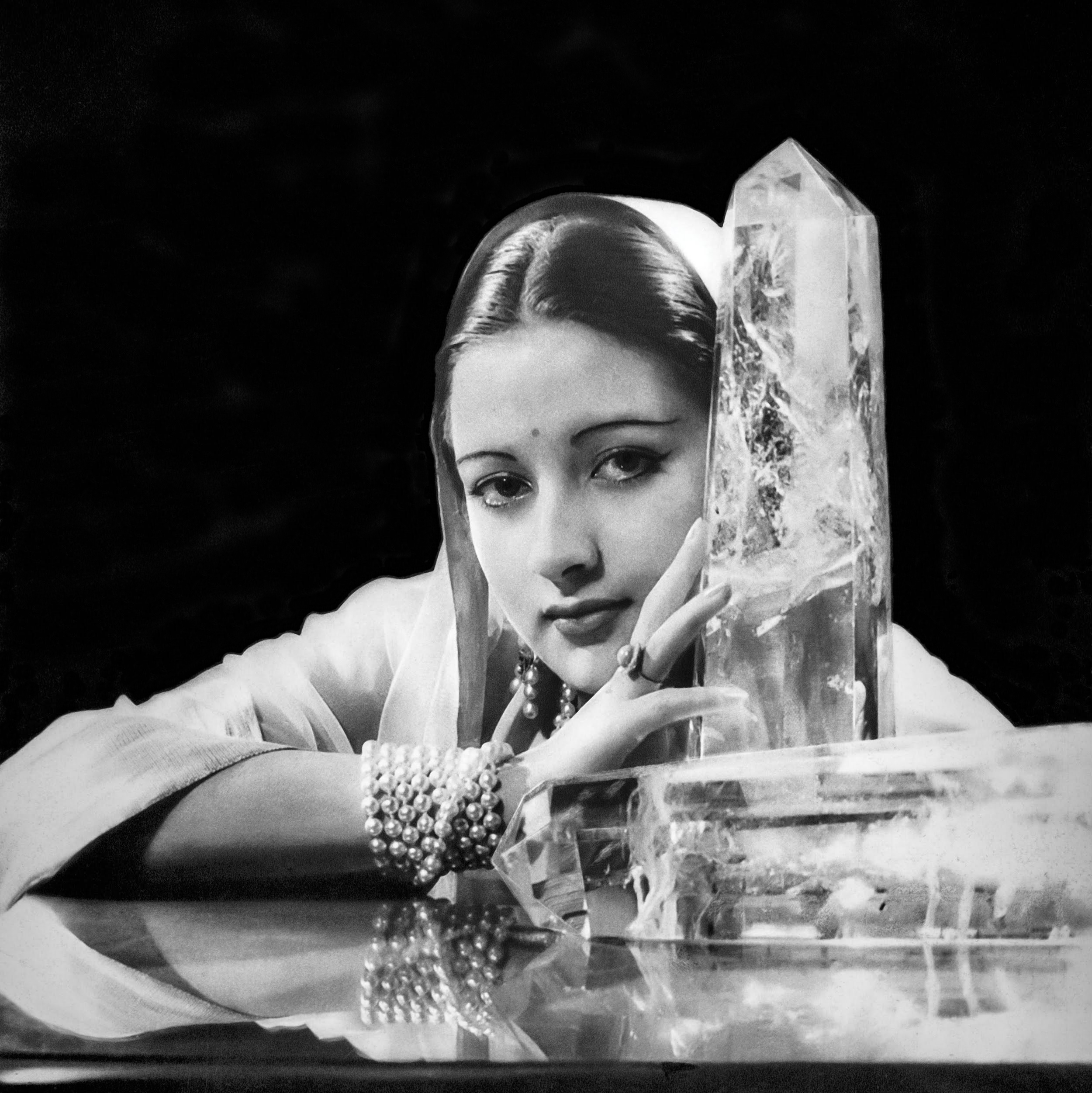
Maharaj Kumar Rani of Kapurthala by Andre Durst (1934)

Sita Devi was born in 1915 to the Hindu Rajput Raja Uday Raj Singh Rathore of Kashipur, Uttarakhand.

At age 13, she married Prince Karamjit Singh, a younger son of the Sikh Maharaja Jagatjit Singh of Kapurthala in Punjab, British India. Her sister-in-law was Brinda Devi, making Princess Indira Devi her niece. As a Hindu devote, she kept her Nepalese cooks with her in order to produce vegetarian food and special Hindu meals for fasts. At her wish, her husband arranged for her to have lessons in Sanskrit, German, Italian, mathematics, history and Hindu rituals. She subsequently became fluent in five languages.

== Life in Europe ==
Devi's first trip to Europe was in 1934. In London, an "onlooker" in the Daily Mail wrote that "Princess Karam is pale. In her own country she is considered the most beautiful of the Princesses; they call her the "Rose of India"." That year Cathleen Mann's sketch of her was displayed at the New English Art Club show at the Suffolk Street Galleries. Subsequently, in Paris, the media widely reported on her looks. In 1938 her portrait featured in Oliver Messel's exhibition.

She was a muse for several photographers, including Cecil Beaton and Man Ray. Vogue named her "one of the most beautiful women in the world".

At the turn of the 20th century, Indian princesses were increasingly wearing western garments, whether openly or under purdah. Sita Devi's preferred couturier was Mainbocher, who designed chiffon saris and fur coats for her, and designed the wedding dress for Wallis Simpson's nuptials with the Duke of Windsor.

The couturier Elsa Schiaparelli was so dazzled by Sita Devi that the gowns of the designer’s 1935 collection were constructed like Indian saris. In early 1939, at Lady Mendl's tea in honor of the Hollywood dietitian, Gayelord Hauser, Sita Devi was listed among the twelve most glamorous women in the world.

At the end of the summer in 1939, Devi was a guest of honour at a party hosted by Elsie de Wolfe.

== Death and legacy ==
Devi died in 2002. Her grandson is a jewellery designer, Hanut Singh.

== Honours ==
- Kaisar-i-Hind Medal [in Silver] (1 January 1944) for her work in raising funds for Indian soldiers in the Second World War.
