= Venu Chitale =

Indian writer and BBC broadcaster (1912–1995)

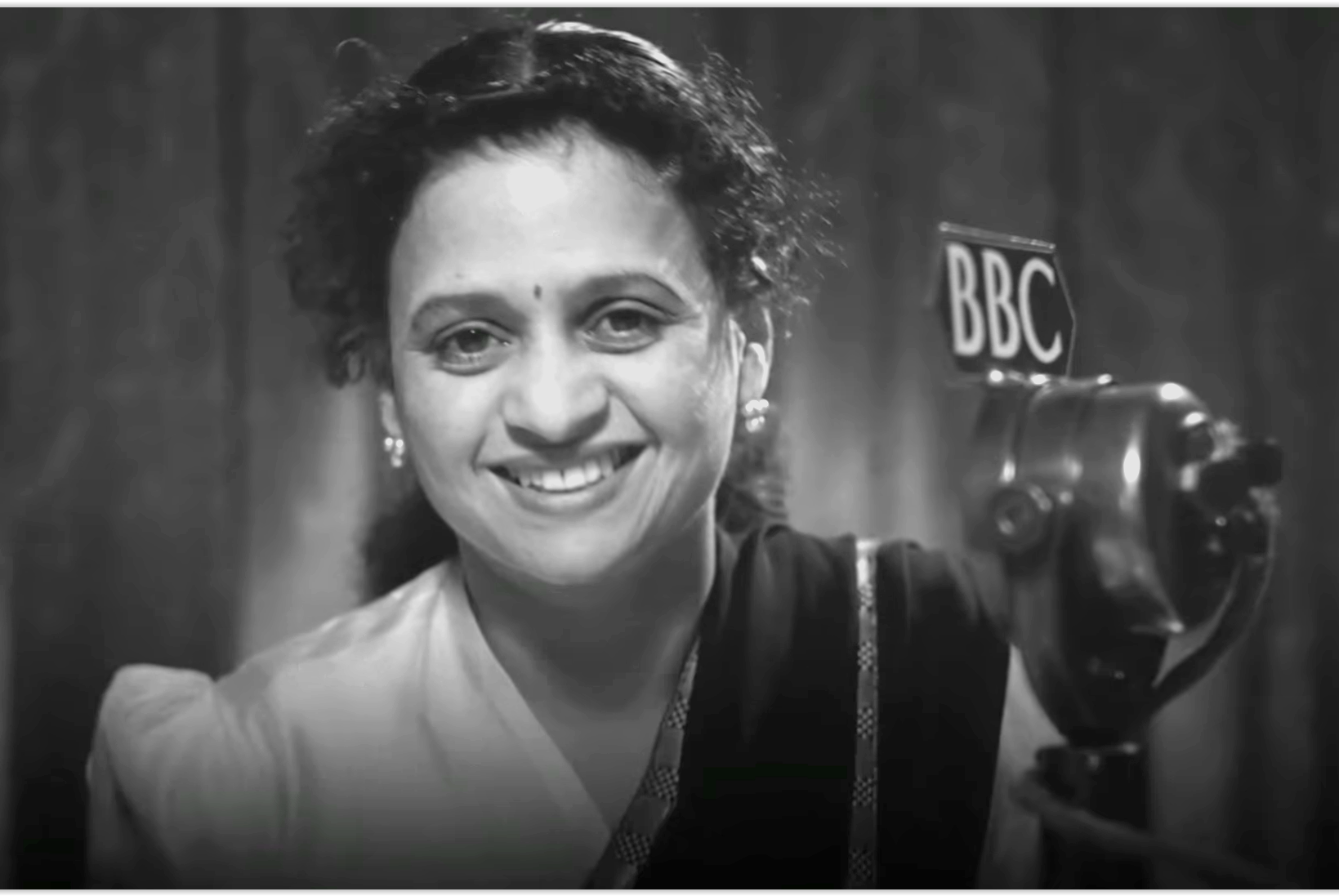
- Venu Chitale at the BBC, 1944
- Born: 28 December 1912; Shirol, Kolhapur, Kolhapur State (present-day Maharashtra, India)
- Died: 1 January 1995 (aged 82); Mumbai, India
- Education: Huzurpaga; Wilson College; University College London; Oxford University
- Occupations: BBC Radio broadcaster, secretary to George Orwell
- Writing career
- Pen name: Weenoo
- Language: English, Hindustani, Marathi
- Notable work: In Transit (1950)

Venu Dattatreye Chitale, also known as Leela Ganesh Khare (28 December 1912 – 1 January 1995), was an Indian writer, BBC Radio broadcaster, and secretary to George Orwell during the early years of the Second World War.

Chitale was born in Kolhapur, Maharashtra, India, and was in England between 1934 and late 1947. In 1940, after assisting with volunteer work in a local air raid precaution unit in Oxford, she moved to London to work with Orwell, then BBC Radio's talks producer. She became a broadcaster for both the India section of the BBC's Eastern Service, where she read news and gave recipes in Marathi, and the BBC Home Service, where she taught British listeners vegetarian cooking at a time when meat was rationed and in short supply.

Around 1944, Chitale began working for Krishna Menon at the India League in London. Towards the end of 1947, after India's independence, she returned there and assisted Vijaya Lakshmi Pandit at refugee camps set up in Delhi following the Partition of India. Her first novel, In Transit, was published in 1950.

Chitale's life is recorded in a chapter in Vijaya Deo's Sakhe Soyare, a book in Marathi. In 2017, the BBC produced a video about her, and in 2023, a Google Doodle was made celebrating her 111th birthday.

== Early life and education ==
Venu Chitale was born in Shirol, Kolhapur, in present-day Maharashtra, India. Her date of birth is given as 28 December 1910 in the 1939 England and Wales Register, and as 1912 in Sahitya Akademi's Who's Who of Indian Writers (1961). (Note: The Sahitya Akademi incorrectly give the publication date of her first novel, In Transit, as 1951.) She was the second youngest of seven children and raised by her older siblings following the death of both her parents. After attending Huzurpaga, one of the oldest girls schools in Pune, she went to St. Columba High School in Mumbai's Gamdevi district before gaining admission to Wilson College, Mumbai, where she was a boarder. There she met the Afrikaaner teacher Johanna Adriana Quinta Du Preez, who was impressed by Chitale's interest in theatre.

Chitale and Du Preez travelled to England together after an astrologer had predicted family troubles should Chitale marry. She subsequently entered University College London, where in 1934 she studied Montessori ways of learning. At the onset of the Second World War in 1939, they were both at the University of Oxford; Chitale registered as an external student while Du Preez was studying journalism. There, she volunteered at a local Air Raid Precautions unit, where her role included alerting locals to bombings and assisting in rescues.

== Early career ==
=== BBC Radio ===
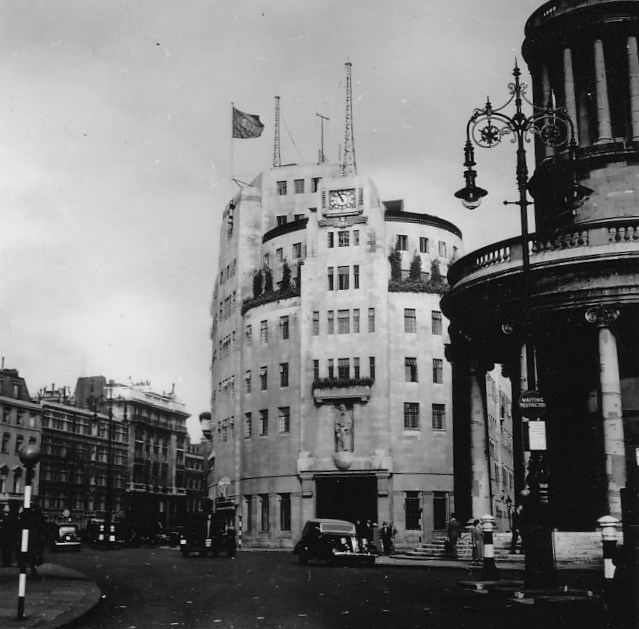
BBC Broadcasting House (late 1930s)

In 1940, at the request of Z. A. Bukhari, Chitale began her career with BBC Radio as secretary to the BBC talks producer George Orwell with the India Section of BBC Radio's Eastern Service. (Note: Du Preez was already a BBC announcer, according to her death certificate (1948) issued in Cape Town.) There, her contemporaries included Una Marson, Mulk Raj Anand, Balraj Sahni, and Princess Indira of Kapurthala. Every month she wrote and delivered a programme preview, which Orwell edited, and regularly read out translated scripts in Marathi, her mother tongue.

In 1941, in one programme titled "The kitchen in wartime: some suggestions for doing without meat", Chitale gave her suggestion of a vegetarian alternative to sausage and mash and spoke of what she thought an Indian housewife might do in Britain with the limited availability of ingredients and fuel; in another, she talked of "appetising curries". In 1942 she approached Orwell's wife, Eileen Blair, with a request to help out with Blair's In the Kitchen series on the BBC Home Service. Chitale also talked to a British audience on the cooking series The Kitchen Front and taught listeners vegetarian cooking at a time when meat was rationed. In addition she broadcast recipes to Indians in India in the programme In Your Kitchen.

In 1943, Chitale contributed the chapter on the European refugee children's exhibition in E. M. Forster's, Ritchie Calder's, Cedric Dover's, and Hsiao Ch'ien's book Talking to India. How popular she was with Indian listeners was documented in 1943 in an unclear Report on Indian Programmes. BBC producer Trevor Hill later recalled in his memoirs Over the Airwaves, that during his early years with the BBC's Overseas Services at 200 Oxford Street, when he was still in his teens "the person I knew best and enjoyed working with was a diminutive, cheerful young Indian woman from Poona, Venu Chitale. Her beautifully embroidered sari and those of her countrywomen gave a marvellous splash of colour to a drab wartime building and to drab studios". (Note: The India Section worked at first from 55 Portland Place, near Broadcasting House, and moved to 200 Oxford Street sometime before October 1942.) Not understanding Marathi, he once played her broadcast from end to beginning. According to Sejal Sutaria, who has written on Chitale, her programmes "illustrate how Indians hired by the BBC during the Second World War faced conflicting needs—to establish their solidarity with Britain during the war while maintaining their allegiance to Indian independence from the Raj".

=== India League ===
Around 1944, Chitale began working for Krishna Menon at the India League in London. There, she became acquainted with Vijaya Lakshmi Pandit. Other members at that time included Bhicoo Batlivala, Ellen Wilkinson and Aneurin Bevan. She was also elected a member of The Asiatic Society.

In 1945 she visited India to attend the eighteenth All India Women's Conference in Hyderabad, held 28 December 1945 to 1 January 1946. There, she was introduced by Sarojini Naidu and spoke of the little interest in India she found in England; she suggested to Indians to learn as many Indian languages as possible to encourage more unity. Chitale later recounted her time in England:

I was in England for fourteen years, fourteen precious young healthy years of my life. I lived in a cottage full of dainty flowers, and more full of wonderful books... I dined on nuts and fruit and on the most luscious greens and vegetables that any fastidious naturopath could prescribe. And I did this in company of English friends who lived for ideals, whether they were humble or elevated did not matter.

== Later career ==
Chitale left Liverpool for Bombay on 4 December 1947, on the RMS Empress of Australia. That year she assisted Pandit with refugee women and children in the camps set up in Delhi following India's Partition.

She published her first novel, In Transit, in 1950, about three generations of an Indian family during the interwar years. Anand wrote the preface. That same year, she married Ganesh Khare, a chartered accountant, and became known as Leela Ganesh Khare. They had a daughter, Nandini Apte. In February 1951 a reception by the publisher Hind Kitabs was held in Bombay, where Chitale was introduced by M. C. Chagla, chief justice of Bombay. She also wrote for Navshakti, a Marathi newspaper, and spoke occasionally on All India Radio. In 1993, she published another book, Incognito, using the pen name 'Weenoo'.

== Death and legacy ==
Chitale died on 1 January 1995, aged 82. Her life is recorded in a chapter in Sakhe Soyare, a book in Marathi authored by Vijaya Deo. In 2017, the BBC produced a video about her. On 28 December 2023, a Google Doodle was made celebrating her 111th birthday.

== Selected works ==
- In Transit. Bombay: Hind Kitabs. 1950.

== See also ==
- Madhur Jaffrey
