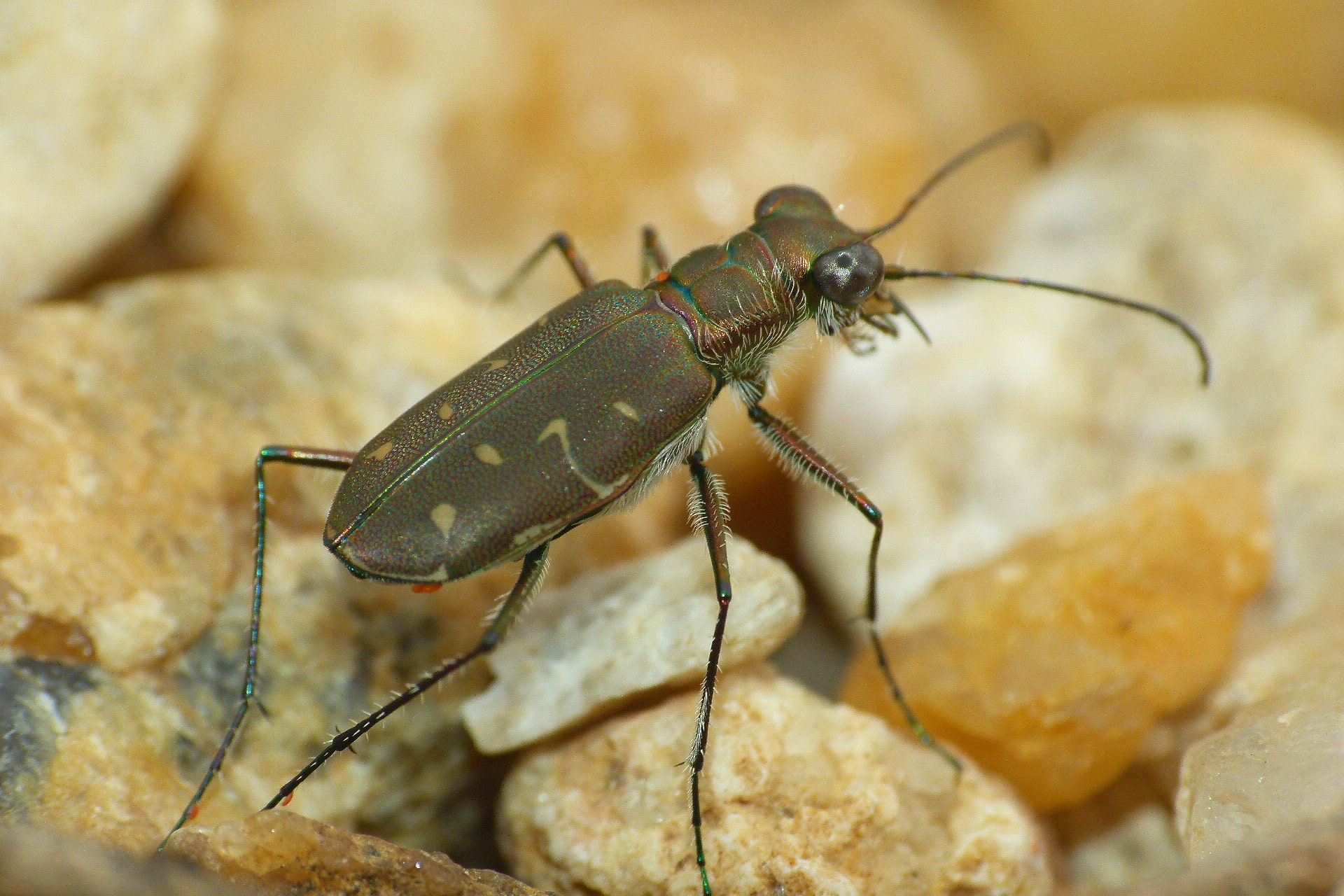

Scientific classification
- Kingdom: Animalia
- Phylum: Arthropoda
- Class: Insecta
- Order: Coleoptera
- Suborder: Adephaga
- Family: Cicindelidae
- Genus: Calomera
- Species: C. fowleri

Binomial name
- Calomera fowleri (Heynes-Wood & Dover, 1928)

Synonyms
- Cicindela fowleri; Cicindela imperfectula W.Horn, 1938; Cicindela imperfecta W.Horn, 1894

= Calomera fowleri =

Species of tiger beetle

Calomera fowleri is a species of tiger beetle endemic to peninsular India. It is found foraging on wet sand and riverine areas in the edges of forests. It is somewhat similar to Calomera angulata but that species is found on open sandy beaches, has bolder markings and longer mandibles.

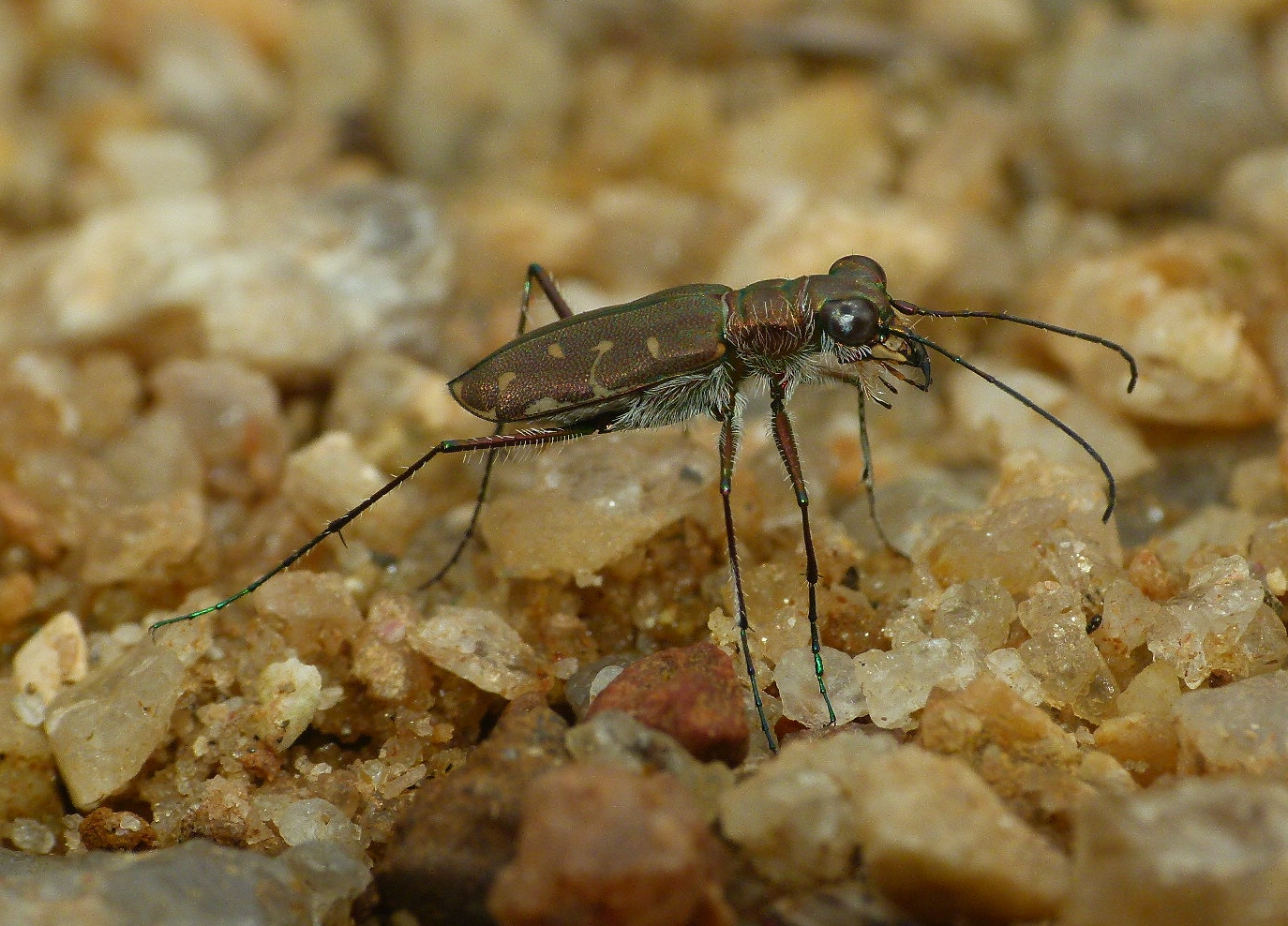
Side view
