= Indira Devi of Kapurthala =

Indian princess and radio presenter (1912–1979)

Indira Devi
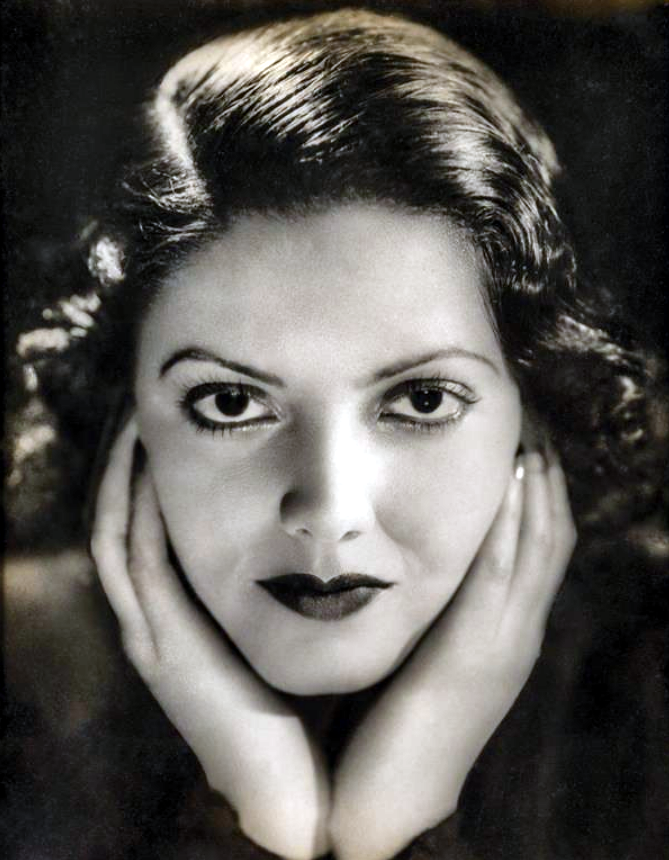
- Devi in 1938
- Born: 26 February 1912; Kapurthala, Kapurthala State, British India
- Died: 1 September 1979 (aged 67); Ibiza, Spain
- Education: Queen Mary College, Lahore
- Occupation: Radio presenter
- Years active: 1939–1968
- Employer: BBC Radio
- Known for: Political correspondent to George Orwell: The Debate Continues from the House of Commons (1940s); Hosting Hello Punjab (1940s)
- Parents: Paramjit Singh (father); Brinda Devi (mother)
- Relatives: Jagatjit Singh (grandfather)

Indira Devi of Kapurthala (26 February 1912 – 1 September 1979), affectionately known as the Radio Princess, was an Indian socialite and princess, the eldest grandchild of Maharaja Jagatjit Singh of the princely state of Kapurthala in Punjab, British India. During the Second World War she was recruited as a political correspondent to George Orwell, for the India team of the BBC. There, she became a regular broadcaster of the programme The Debate Continues from the House of Commons, and Hello Punjab, a programme in Hindustani for the British Indian Army. With Narayana Menon she hosted the Indian Service musical programmes.

At the age of 23, Devi had secretly travelled to London to become an actress, telling only her two sisters, and enrolled at the Royal Academy of Dramatic Art. For a brief period, she worked at London Films with Alexander Korda, and in 1938, she appeared on stage for the first time, when she played the role of a Turkish slave girl.

At the onset of the Second World War, Devi sat the St John Ambulance examinations and qualified in first aid. She subsequently transported casualties during the Blitz. In 1943, she was appointed permanently within the BBC Radio's Overseas Service Division, and in 1951, she reported on the 30th anniversary of the 1921 Northern Ireland general election. Following a road trip to India in 1958, she narrated a film by the explorer Count Vitold de Golish, Twilight of the Maharajahs, for the BBC in their Adventure series. It was delivered alongside her own life, having discovered old film footage after revisiting her former palace in India. She continued to work for the BBC until 1968, and spent her last years in Ibiza, Spain, where she managed a bar.

== Early life and education ==
Indira Devi was born in Kapurthala on 26 February 1912, to the Sikh prince Paramjit Singh and his Hindu Rajput wife Brinda Devi. She was the eldest of their three daughters and the eldest grandchild of Maharaja Jagatjit Singh of the princely state of Kapurthala in Punjab, British India. In infancy, she failed to grow until fed on goat's milk, and in 1919, she caught measles along with her sisters. Her mother later recalled that Devi was close to being spoilt and was sent to board at Queen Mary College, Lahore. There, she studied politics, and decided she would like to be an actress. In 1934, she was noted to "have done exceptionally well" as an owner of dogs at the Tail-Waggers Club, and she was known to feel more comfortable in her jodhpurs during the day and a saree for formal wear.

At the age of 23 years she secretly travelled to London to become an actress, telling only her two sisters, Sushila and Ourmilla. At the time, her mother was visiting the United States, and upon receiving Devi's telegram stating "I have left India without permission" ... "and am on my way to London", her mother went to London to meet her. Devi had saved her allowances and following her departure against her father and grandfather's wishes, had supposedly been the centre of much gossip in India. She arrived in London on the SS Kaisar-I-Hind on 15 November 1935, giving her forwarding address as Westbourne Street, W2. (Note: Devi's arrival in England is given as 1 January 1935 in The Open University document. She had previously visited London at least once, when at age two she accompanied her parents from Paris at the onset of World War I.) In London, her mother, initially furious over the incident, ultimately helped her enroll at the Royal Academy of Dramatic Art and enlisted the help of Walter Pidgeon, who provided the letter introducing her to Alexander Korda, who reluctantly agreed to assist. For a brief period, she worked at London Films with Korda, who intended to launch her career in films, after Merle Oberon. She played several extra-roles, learnt to walk like a model and how to do Western make-up. She appeared on stage for the first time in 1938, when she played the role of a Turkish slave girl in a play about Keats, Byron and Shelley, The Heart was not Burned, at the Gate Theatre. (Note: Cast with James Mason and Pamela Brown, at the Gate Theatre in London, not Dublin.) She subsequently had a role in the children's theatrical piece Let's Pretend. Her sisters were reported to visit her in London, and the three were popular socialites of the 1930s. In addition, sometime in the 1930s, she also featured in Vogue.

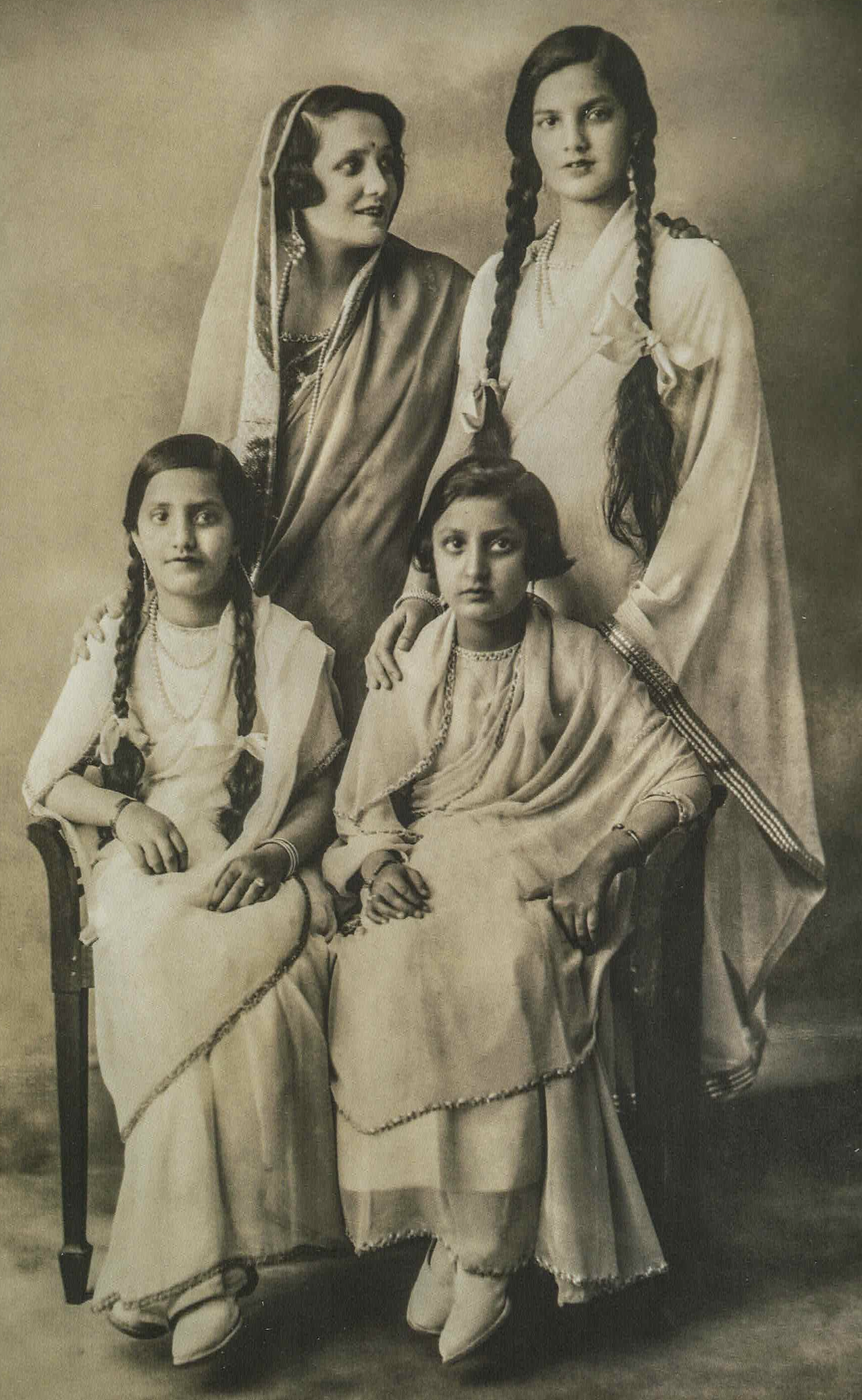
Indira Devi with her mother and two sisters

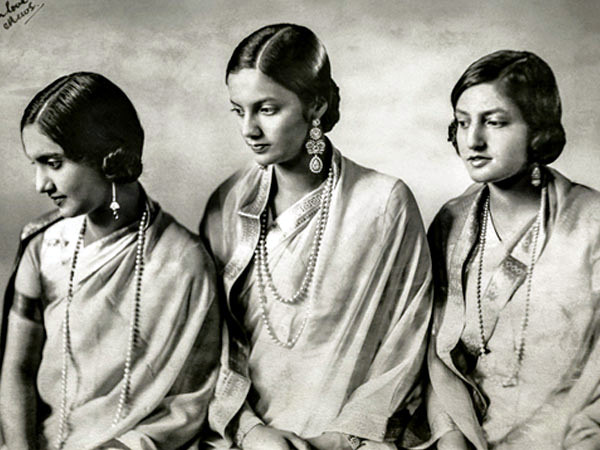
Indira Devi (centre) with her sisters princesses Sushila (left) and Ourmilla (right) (1935)

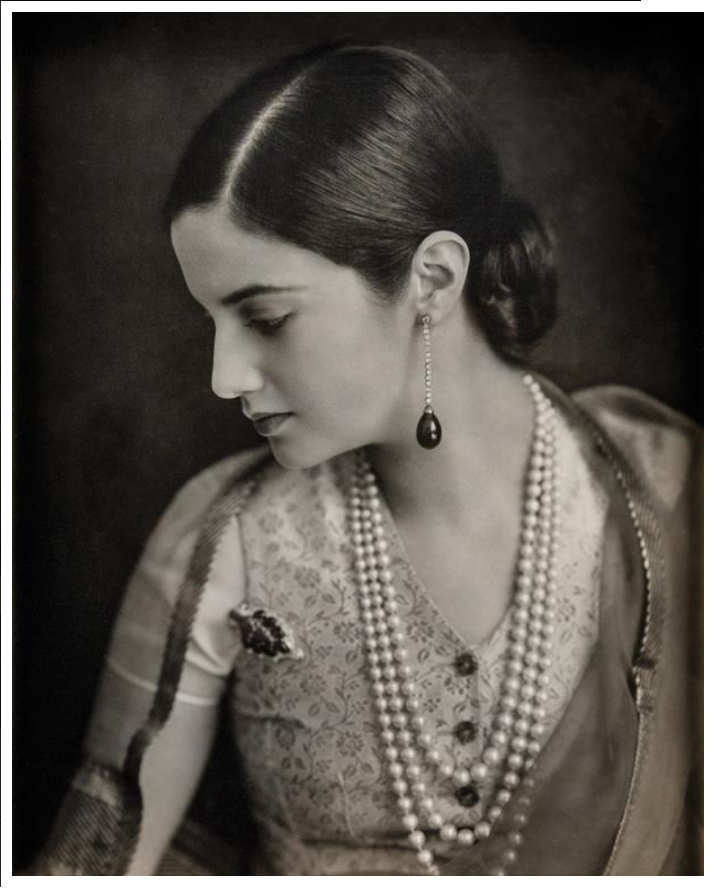
Indira Devi, mid 1930s, Kinsey Studios, Delhi.

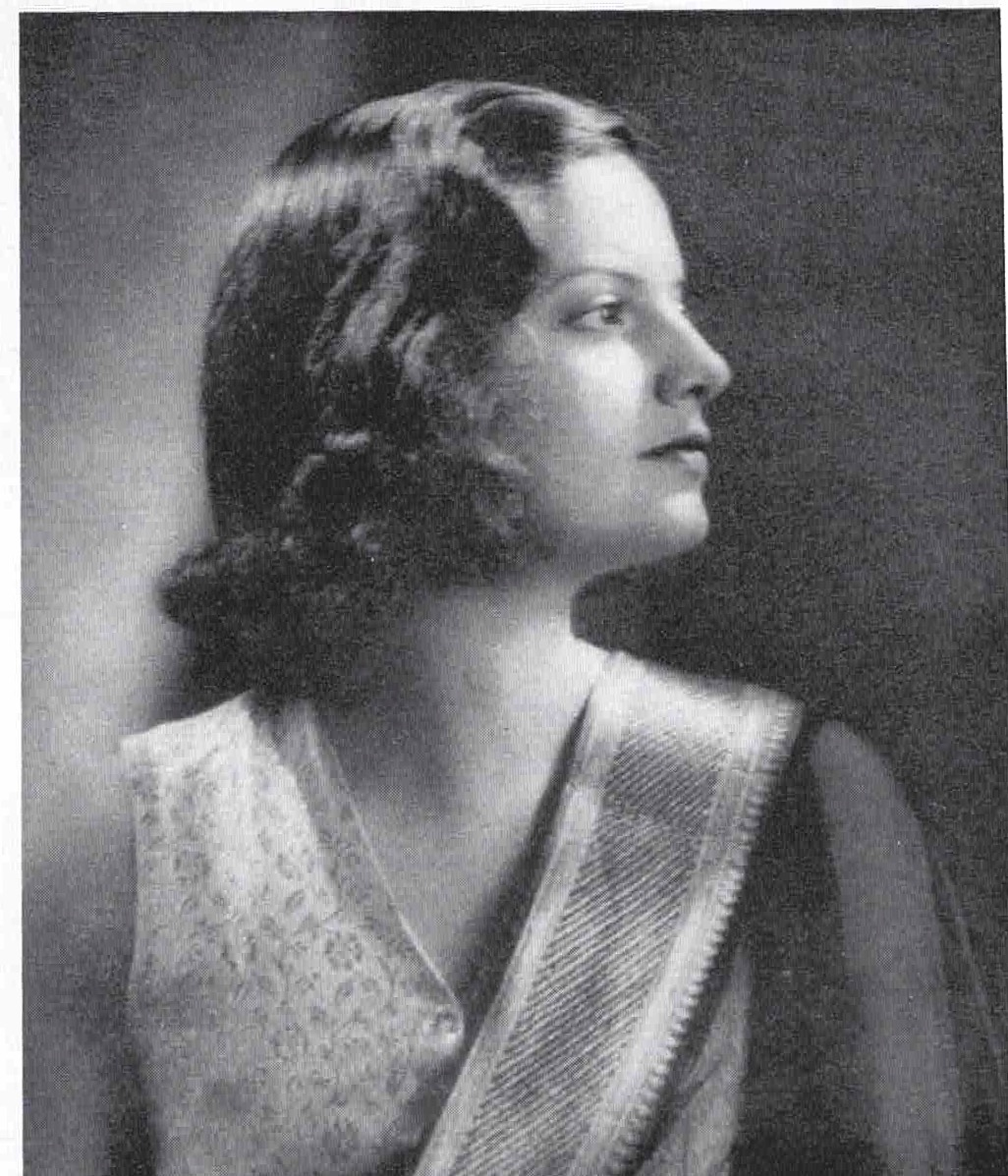
Indira Devi, likely mid-1930s, Hay Wrightson Ltd.

== Second World War ==
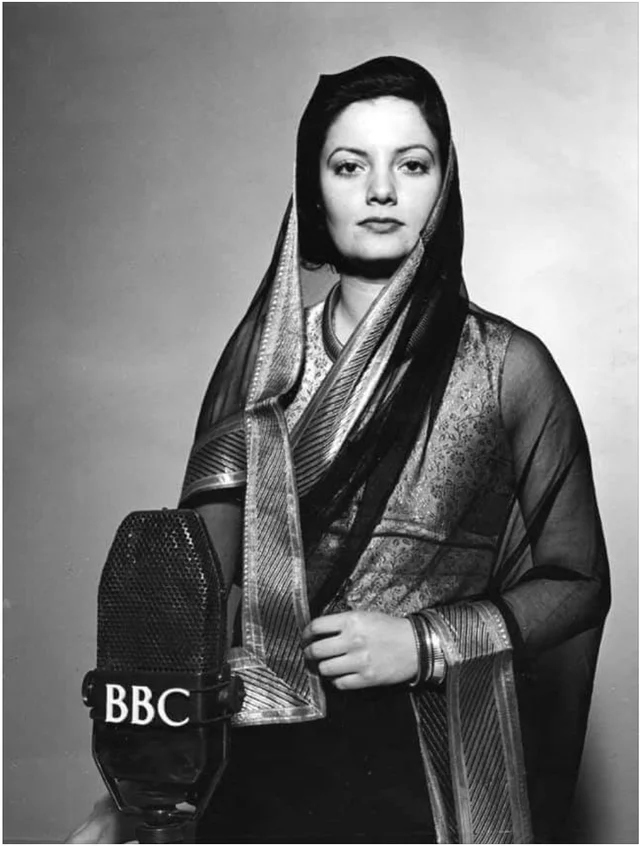
Indira Devi at the BBC, December 1942

At the onset of the Second World War, Devi sat and passed the St John Ambulance first aid examination, and subsequently transported casualties during the Blitz. Earlier, she had travelled Europe and was in Munich in 1939, at the time of the Munich Crisis. For a short while, she worked as a censor for the wartime department of postal censorship.

She joined BBC Radio in 1939. At that time, she lived at 512a Nell Gwynn House, Sloane Avenue, Kensington. In 1941, she became political correspondent for the India team of the BBC, with George Orwell as the talk producer, and with the aim at enlisting Indian support for the War. Others on the team included Mulk Raj Anand, Venu Chitale, Zulfiqar Ali Bukhari, T. S. Eliot and E. M. Forster. She appeared regularly on the Home Service and the Eastern Service, and became affectionately known as the "Radio Princess". She hosted talks with Indian men in technical training based in the UK, and a 30-minute programme called Hello Punjab, a programme in Hindustani for the British Indian Army based in the Middle East and the Mediterranean. From the House of Commons, where she was sometimes the only woman in the press gallery, she analysed and broadcast weekly reports to India in a programme called The Debate Continues. With Narayana Menon she hosted the Indian Service musical programmes, and was familiar with popular and classical western music. In 1943 she was appointed permanently at the Overseas Service Division.

With regard to the BBC's wartime broadcasts to listeners in India, when an initial questionnaire was sent across India asking about who people preferred to listen to, Devi was found to be twice as popular as Orwell. (Note: How accurate the report was is not clear. Laurence Brander, who was tasked to investigate the impact of the Indian programmes, did not gather the data himself, and told Orwell that very few Indians listened to the broadcasts.) BBC producer Trevor Hill later recalled in his memoirs Over the Airwaves, that Devi was a "very elegant lady in beautifully cut English tweeds, and with a beautifully cut Oxford accent to match". In India she was noted to have a "very good command of English".

== Post-war life ==
In February 1948, Devi was cleared of a charge of driving under the influence of alcohol in November 1947, but given a fine for dangerous driving, found to be due to taking pills containing ephedrine, caffeine and phenobarbitone, which she mistook for aspirin. At the time she resided at Yeoman's Row, Chelsea. In 1949, when her father became the Maharaja of Kapurthala, following the death of her grandfather, she was living in Ivinghoe Aston, Buckinghamshire.

In 1951, Devi visited Stormont. There, she reported on the anniversary of the 1921 Northern Ireland general election. The following year she visited New York to see the new United Nations Building and report on the International Refugee Organization. She left New York on 23 January 1952 on the SS Liberté bound for Plymouth. The following month, Frances P. Bolton had praised her report as "clear and concise" and included it in her remarks at the House of Representatives.

In 1953, Devi co-directed a musical with Wauna Paul. That year, the Daily Mirror published a photograph of Devi changing the tyre of a caravan, also carrying Paul; they were preparing to drive to India. In 1962, following her return from India, she narrated a film by the explorer Count Vitold de Golish, Twilight of the Maharajahs, for the BBC in their Adventure series. It was delivered alongside her own life, having discovered old film footage after recently revisiting her former family palace. In 1963 she narrated Disciples of the Sword, a film about the Sikhs by Rustom Master in the same series. She continued to work for the BBC until 1968.

In later life she moved to Ibiza, Spain, where she managed a bar. She died there in September 1979.

== Selected publications ==
- The Revenge of the Gods: A story of ancient Egypt. The Eastern Press, London, 1928.
