= Hello Punjab =

BBC Hindustani Radio programme broadcast

Hello Punjab was a BBC Hindustani Radio programme broadcast, hosted by Princess Indira Devi of Kapurthala during World War II. It sent recorded voice messages of Punjabi soldiers of the Indian Sub-continent, fighting against Axis in different parts of the world under British Rule, to their families residing in various parts of Punjab.

== See also ==
- Talking to India
