= Brinda Devi =

Crown Princess Brinda Devi
- Crown Princess of Kapurthala; Princess of Jubbal
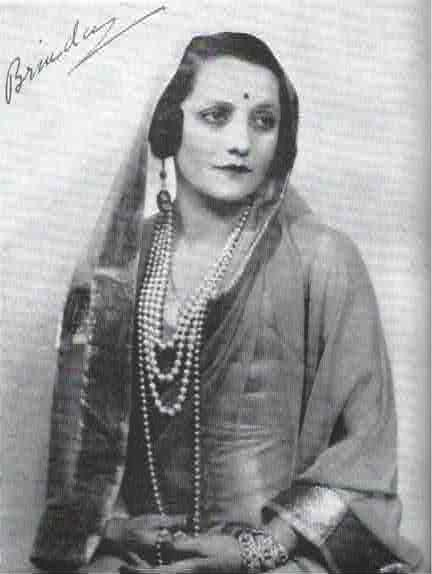
- Brinda Devi in her mid-twenties
- Born: 11 January 1890; Deorha, Principality of Jubbal
- Died: May 1962 (aged 72); Woodville Palace, Shimla, Himachal Pradesh, India
- Spouse: Paramjit Singh, Crown Prince of Kapurthala (m. 1911; died 1955)
- Issue: Princess Indira Devi; Princess Sushila Devi; Princess Urmila Devi
- Father: Prince Gambhir Chand of Jubbal
- Mother: Devi Kaur

Brinda Devi, Crown Princess of Kapurthala (11 January 1890 - died 25 July 1962), was an Indian royal and a socialite, the wife of Crown Prince Paramjit Singh of Kapurthala (eldest son of Maharaja Jagatjit Singh I of Kapurthala in Punjab, British India). Her daughter was Princess Indira Devi and her sister-law was Princess Sita Devi. The tune Let's Misbehave by Cole Porter was written for her.

== Gallery ==
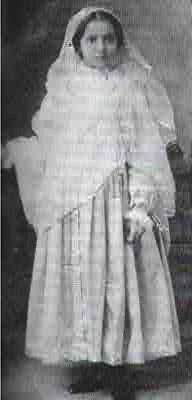
Devi age eight years (before 1900)

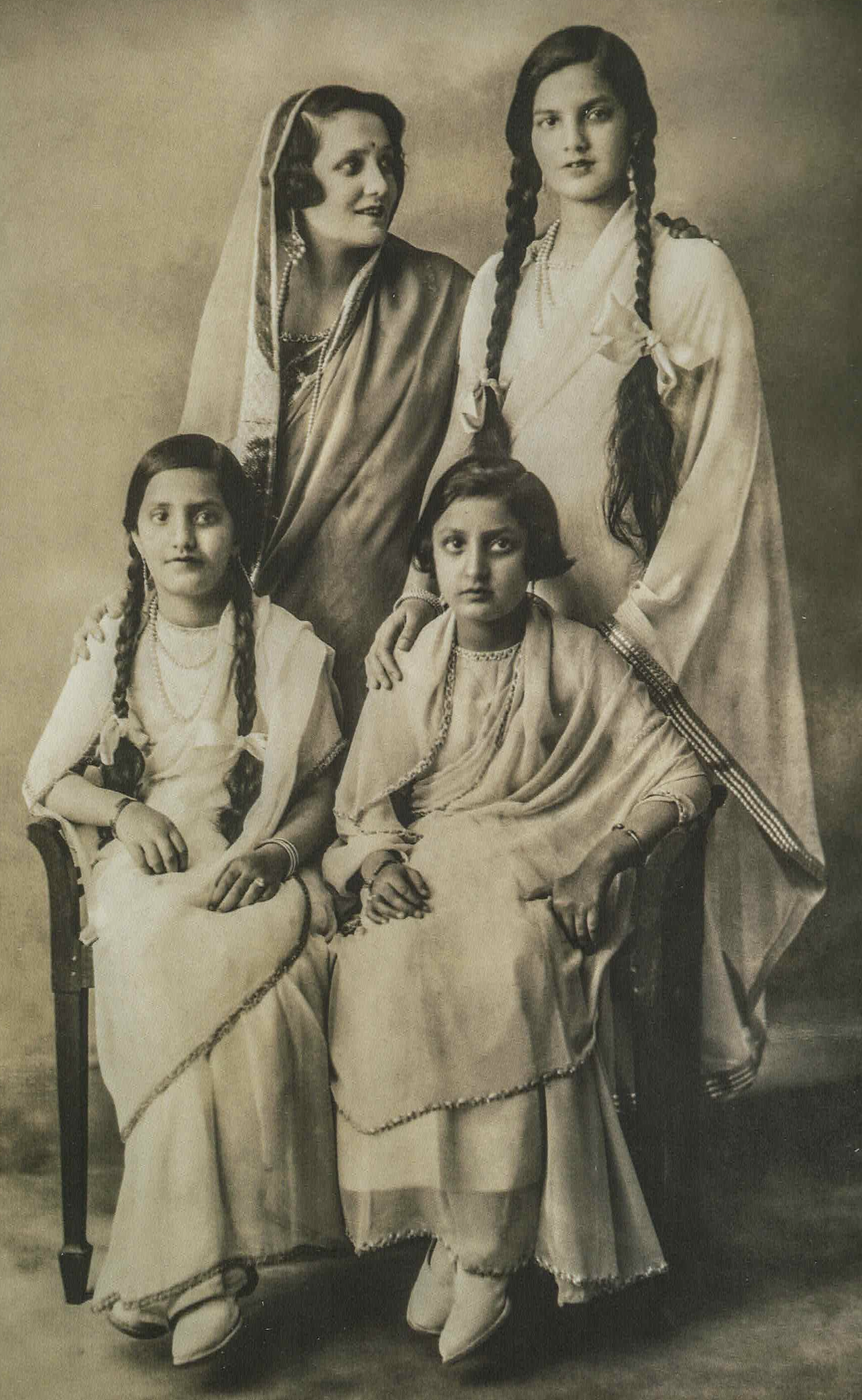
Devi with her three daughters

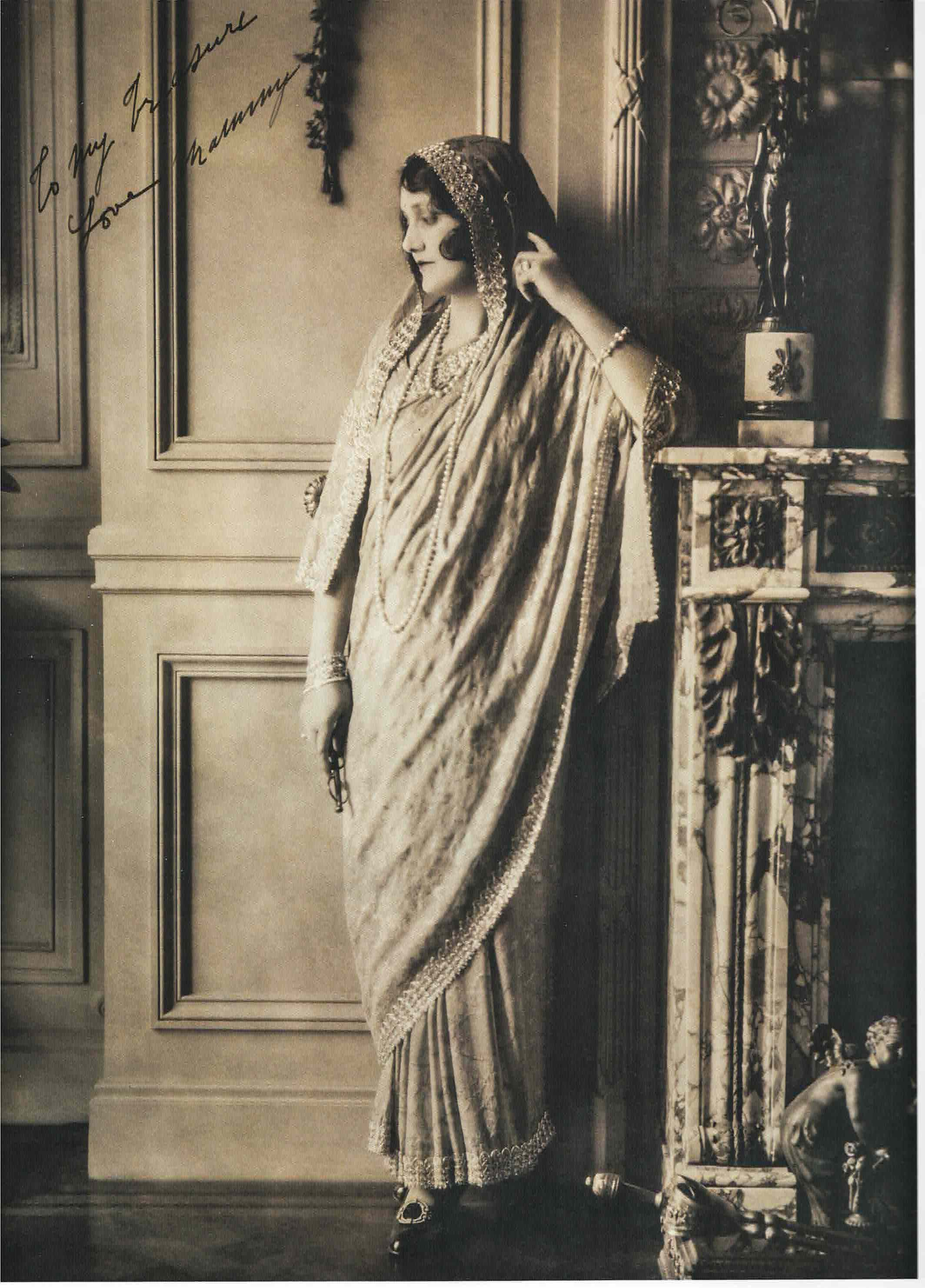
Devi

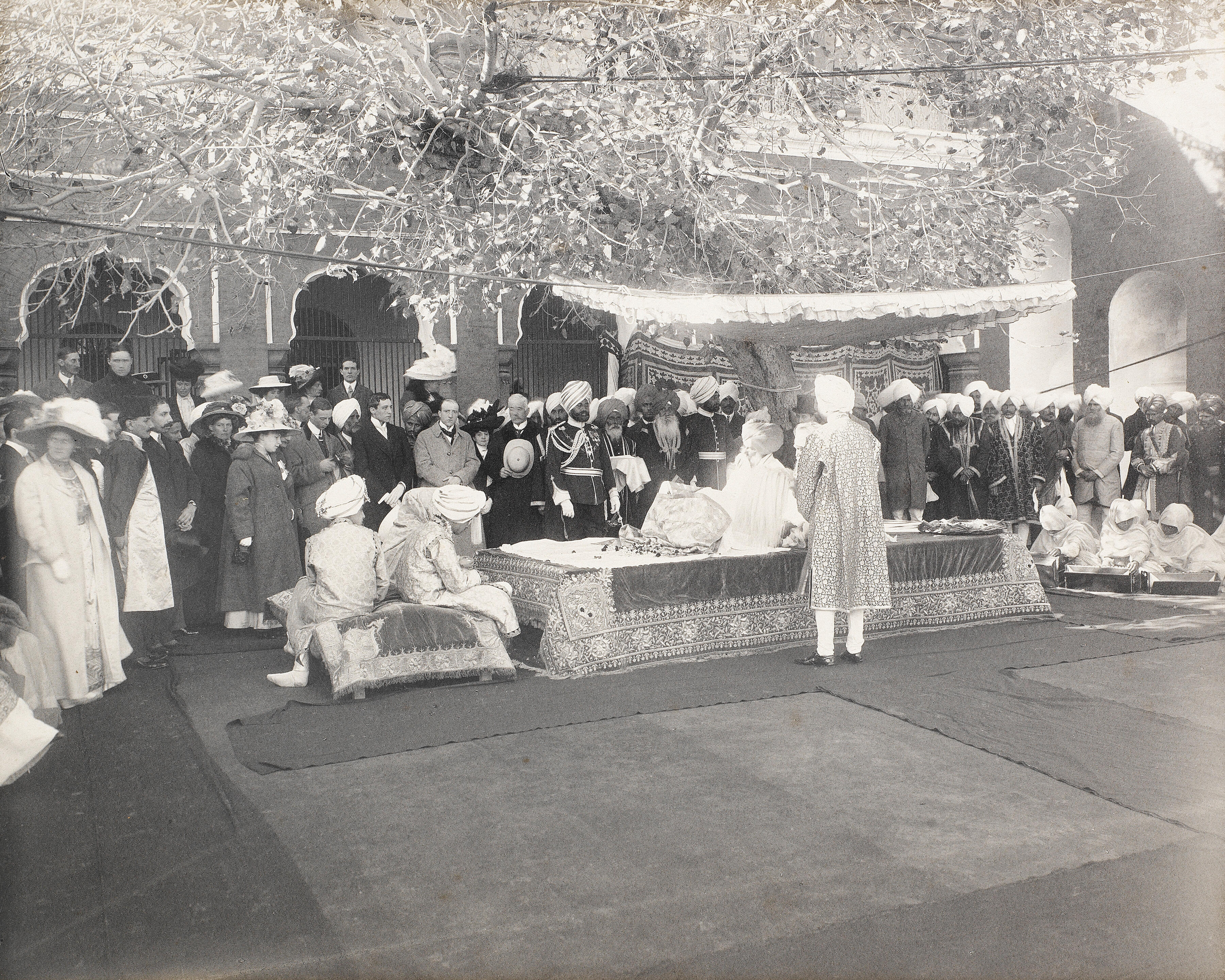
Photograph of the wedding of Kunwar Paramjit Singh of Kapurthala and Maharani Brinda Devi Sahiba of Jubbal, 2 February 1911

== See also ==
- Michael O'Dwyer

== Bibliography ==
- Williams, Elaine (2003). Maharani: Memoirs of a rebellious princess. Brinda, Maharani of Kapurthala. New Delhi: Rupa & Co. ISBN 0-595-09428-7.
- Williams, Elaine (1954). Maharani: Memoirs of a rebellious princess. Brinda, Maharani of Kapurthala. Henry Holt. ISBN 0-595-09428-7.

== External ==
Crown Princess Brinda Devi Born: 11 January 1890 Died: 01 May 1962
Titles in pretence
Preceded by Princess Lachmi Kaur	-Titular- Queen Consort of Kapurthala; 1949–1955 with Lilavati Devi Kangra & Stella Alice Mudge	Vacant Title next held by Princess Gita Devi of Jasdan
