= St Joseph's College, Calcutta =

St. Joseph's College, Calcutta

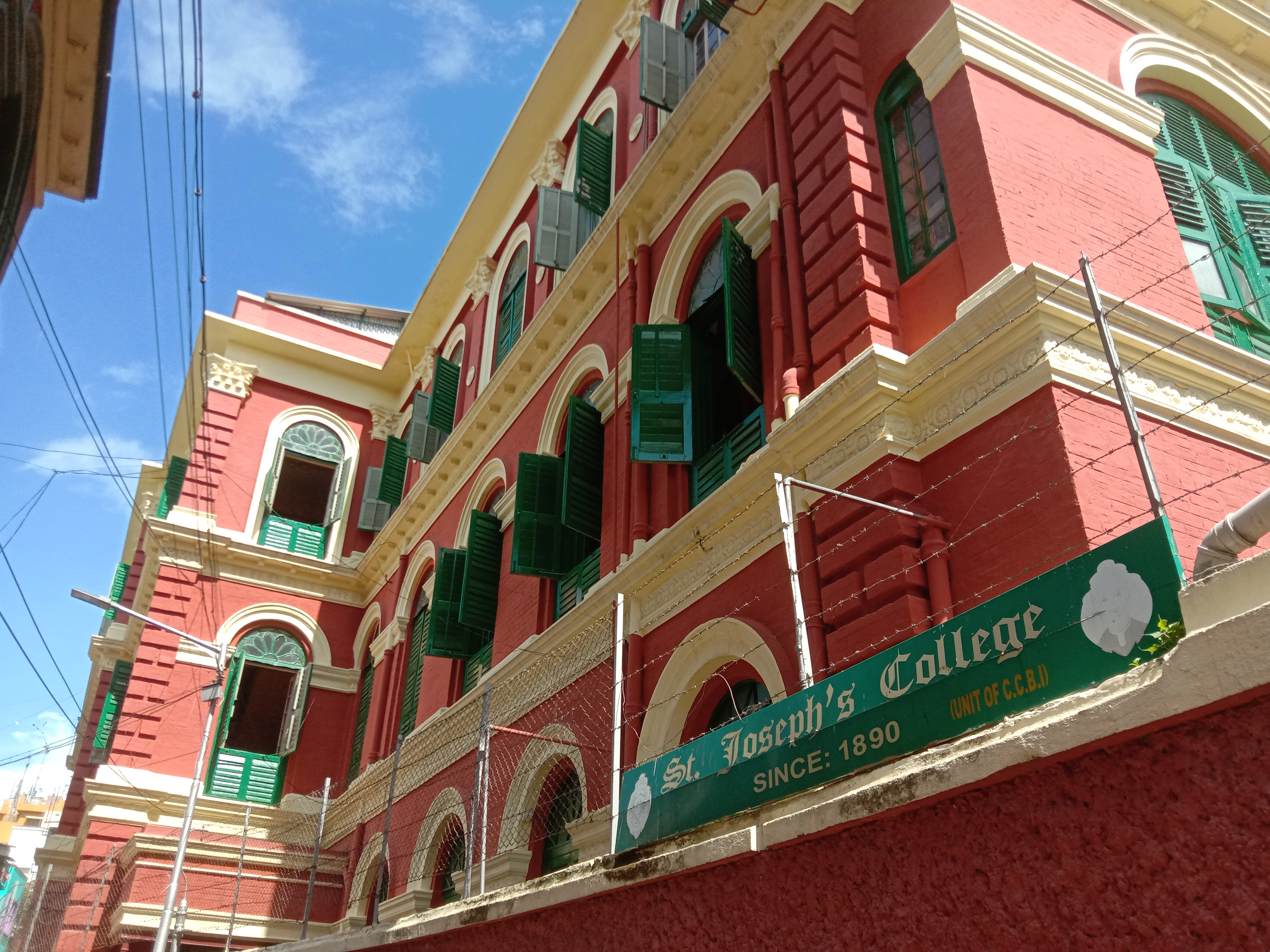
- St Joseph's College in June 2022

Location
- 69, Bepin Behari Ganguly Street; Calcutta, West Bengal, 700012; India; 22.5692°N 88.3593°E

Information
- School type: Private day school
- Motto: Latin: Viriliter age (Act Manfully)
- Religious affiliations: Roman Catholic; Congregation of Christian Brothers
- Established: 1848; 178 years ago
- Founder: Edmund Ignatius Rice (as founder of the Congregation of Christian Brothers)
- School board: ICSE (year 10); ISC (year 12)
- Gender: Boys
- Classes: Nursery to 12
- Language: English
- Campus type: Urban
- Houses: Red, Blue, Green and Gold
- Colours: Green and gold
- Song: Lift Up Your Voice Today
- Annual tuition: ₹61,812 to ₹81,228
- Affiliation: Council for the Indian School Certificate Examinations
- UDISE Code: 19170105015
- CISCE Code: WB024
- Pupils: Josephites
- Website: sjckolkata.com

St. Joseph's College (informally SJC) is a boy's private day school in Calcutta, West Bengal, India. It is run by the Congregation of Christian Brothers and is affiliated to the Council for the Indian School Certificate Examinations. The school falls under the St. Francis Xavier's Church, Kolkata Deanery, Roman Catholic Archdiocese of Calcutta.

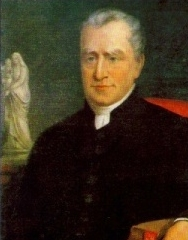
Edmund Ignatius Rice is the founder of Congregation of Christian Brothers.

== Honours and achievements ==
=== Brothers and faculty ===
The school has been served by many Irish Christian Brothers over the years. One of the last of them to serve in India, Br. Brendan MacCarthaigh, played an integral part in St. Joseph's in particular, and the Christian Brothers schools in India in general since his arrival in India in 1960. His stay of service in the country, however, was truncated to 62 years in 2022 due to visa issues. He has been inducted into The Telegraph Education Foundation's Hall of Fame in 2016.

=== Pupils ===
From left to right: the tie worn by students from KG to year 10, and the tie worn by year 11 and 12 students.

The school produced an All India Rank 8th in 2025 after a decade when Himadyuti Bhattacharyya secured 98.6% in his year 10 (ICSE) examination which is the current school record in the examination .

The school topped the charts in academic performances in 2009 when Subhojit Ghosh secured 99.25% in his year 12 (ISC) examination, which was then the all-time national record in the history of the examination.

== Notable alumni ==
- Cedric Dover, British Indian zoologist and writer on social issues.
- Hashim Abdul Halim, politician and speaker of the West Bengal Legislative Assembly from 1982 to 2011.
- Arindam Sil, actor, film director and producer.
- Shantanu Maheshwari, actor, dancer and choreographer.
- Raj Kamal Jha, novelist and Editor-in-Chief of The Indian Express.
