= Kalipada Biswas =

Botanist (1899–1969)

Kali Pada Biswas
- Born: 3 December 1899; Calcutta, India
- Died: 29 December 1969 (aged 70); Calcutta, India

Academic background
- Education: University of Edinburgh

Academic work
- Discipline: Botanist
- Institutions: University College of Science and Technology

Kalipada Biswas (3 December 1899 – 29 December 1969) was an Indian botanist who specialized in the algae of the Indian region and worked at the Calcutta Botanical Garden, becoming its first Indian director and heading it from 1937 to 1955.

== Early life and education ==
Biswas was born in Calcutta to Shri and Sarada Prasad Biswas and grew up at Beltala, studying at the Mitra Institution, Bhowanipur where he was a contemporary of Shyama Prasad Mukherjee. He was among the first group of students at Bangabasi College, which he graduated from in 1920. He studied under S.P. Agharkar, S.N. Bal, S.C. Banerjee and G.C. Bose. Biswas graduated with an M.A. in Botany in 1922 from the University College of Science and Technology in Kolkata. He was recognized for being first in his class with the University Gold Medal.

== Career ==
He became interested in the algae through the influence of Paul Johannes Brühl and began to examine algae from various waterbodies including Salt Lake and Chilka. He was appointed curator of the herbarium at the Royal Botanic Gardens in Calcutta in 1927. In 1936, he was sent to Europe and worked at the Royal Botanical Gardens, Kew and Royal Botanic Garden Edinburgh and in the Natural History Department of the British Museum. There, he studied at the University of Edinburgh under Sir William Wright Smith He received a DSc from the University of Edinburgh in 1937.

He returned to India to and was assigned as Director of the Botanical Survey of India. He is credited as a leader in reviving and reorganizing the Botanical Survey of India.

He was the first Indian to publish original findings on diatoms and iron bacteria of India.

After retiring from the Botanical Garden he became a director of the medical plants scheme of the West Bengal Government in 1954. From 1955 -1956 he was Chairman, Medicinal Plants Committee-member of the Executive Council, Central Indian Medicinal Plants Organization and National Botanic Gardens, Lucknow. He retired in December 1964 but continued to work as an emeritus scientist at the University of Calcutta.

He was awarded the Elliot Gold Medal and Prize in 1928 and again in 1936; the Coronation Medal in 1937 for meritorious service in the Royal Botanical Garden and at the Herbarium; the Paul Johannes Briihl Memorial Medal in 1952 for the best research work in Systematic Botany; the Rabindranath Prize in Science in 1951-52 and the Barclay Memorial Medal in 1969.

Biswas wrote numerous papers on botany and botanical history. He considered Ficus krishnae as a mutant variety of Ficus bengalensis.

Many of his botanical collections, including from Nagaland, Tripura, Manipur, Orissa, Bihar, Sikkim and South Burma are now housed at the Central National Herbarium in Calcutta.

The standard author abbreviation Biswas is used to indicate this person as the author when citing a botanical name.

== Personal life ==
Biswas had a wife, two sons and two daughters. One daughter passed away before Biswas. His sons both went onto academic positions—Sanat Biswas became a Professor at Bengal Engineering College and Dr. Sanjib Kumar Biswas was a geologist at the Oil and Natural Gas Commission. Biswas was a life member of the Himalayan Club for nearly 30 years and died at his residence on 29 December 1969 at the age of 70.
