= Talking to India =

1943 book edited by George Orwell

- Title page for Talking to India (1943)
- Editors: George Orwell
- Author: E. M. Forster, Ritchie Calder, Cedric Dover, Hsiao Ch'ien and others
- Language: English
- Publisher: Allen and Unwin
- Publication date: 1943
- Publication place: UK

Talking to India is a book authored by E. M. Forster, Ritchie Calder, Cedric Dover, Hsiao Ch'ien and others, and published by Allen and Unwin in 1943. It was edited by George Orwell following his time at the BBC Radio Eastern Service. It includes a chapter by Venu Chitale.
