= Bevin trainees =

Bevin trainees were Indian men in technical training brought to the UK during the Second World War via a scheme created by Ernest Bevin, to work in factories. They were better recognised in India, and sometimes informally referred to as 'Bevin boys', causing confusion with the adolescent Bevin Boys sent to work in coal mines in the UK. Broadcaster Princess Indira Devi of Kapurthala introduced some of them on BBC Radio, so they could send messages back to India. Foreign office entrants after 1945 have also been referred to as Bevin boys.

Bevin trainees featured in a popular BBC Radio series, in which Salamu and Chandu, two fictional mice, travelled from India to England in the suitcase of a trainee, and witnessed life in Britain.
