= Arun Singh (politician, born 1944) =

Kapurthalian Royal and Indian politician

- Born: Srinagar, Jammu and Kashmir
- Education: The Doon School
- Alma mater: St. Stephen's College, Delhi; St Catharine's College, Cambridge
- Occupation: Former Defence Minister
- Spouse: Nina Singh (divorced) Ramola (m. 1988)
- Father: Maharajkumar Karamjit Singh
- Relatives: Martand Singh (brother); Makarand Paranjape (son-in-law); Jagatjit Singh of Kapurthala (grandfather)

Arun Singh is a former union minister of state for defence in the Government of India. He was minister in the government headed by Rajiv Gandhi.

== Early life and education ==
Born a Rajkumar in the princely family of Kapurthala, Singh was born in Srinagar, in what was then the salute state of Jammu and Kashmir. He is the elder son of Maharajkumar Karamjit Singh (1896–1967), the second son of Maharaja Jagatjit Singh of Kapurthala. Educated at The Doon School and at St. Stephen's College, Delhi, Singh subsequently read for an MA at St Catharine's College, Cambridge. At the Doon School and Cambridge, he was a classmate of Rajiv Gandhi.

== Career ==
After completing his MA in 1971, Arun Singh joined The Metal Box Company and later Reckitt and Coleman. In 1984, he was elected as an MP from Uttar Pradesh, serving in the Rajya Sabha until 1988.

In September 1985, he was appointed as the minister of state for defence for research and development, and put in charge of India's program to modernize its military and develop indigenous arms production.

On 15 July 1987, Singh resigned from the government, drawing some negative attention for leaving the government before the arrival of the Bofors scandal. Singh left the government without explanation. Singh maintained that he had not received any money from the company.

At the time of Kargil war in 1999, NDA defence minister Jaswant Singh brought him back as his advisor.

According to a Hindustan Times article quoting an article published in Caravan's May 2014 Issue, Rajiv Gandhi, along with Arun Singh and Arun Nehru, was responsible for taking decision on "go ahead" for Operation Blue Star, despite Indira Gandhi's consistent reluctance against the army entering the sacred shrine. The decision was taken with an eye on the Lok Sabha polls slated to be held at the end of 1984.
