= Agharkar Research Institute =

Research institute in Pune, India

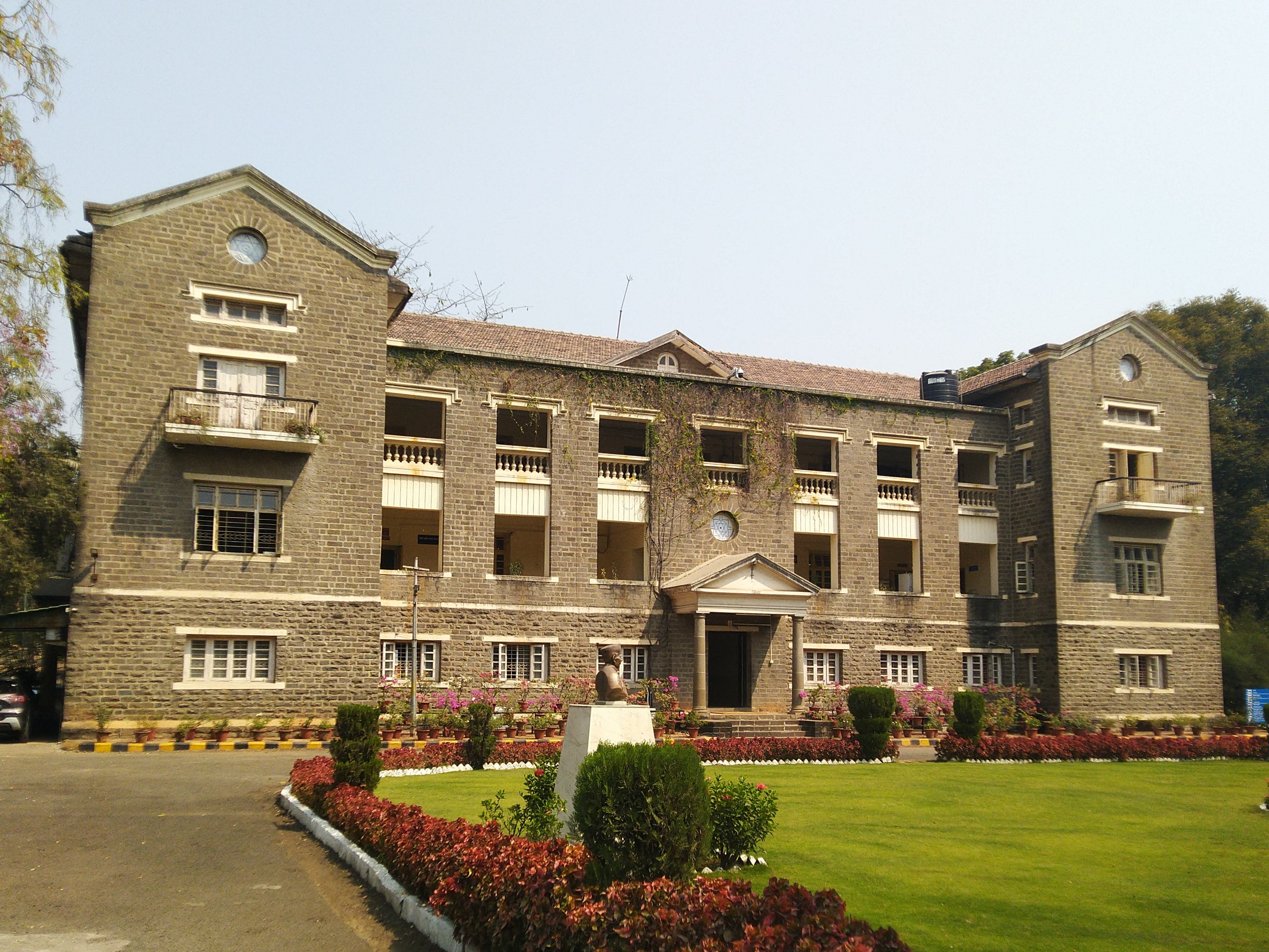
- Type: Research Institute
- Established: 1946
- Director: Prashant K. Dhakephalkar
- Location: Pune, Maharashtra, India
- Campus: Urban
- Founder Director: Shankar Purushottam Agharkar
- Website: www.aripune.org
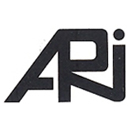

The Agharkar Research Institute (ARI) is located in Pune, Maharashtra, India. Agharkar Research Institute (ARI) is an autonomous, grant-in-aid research institute of the Department of Science and Technology (DST), Government of India. It was established in 1946 by the Maharashtra Association for the Cultivation of Science as MACS Research Institute and renamed as ARI in 1992 in honour and memory of its founder Director, late Professor Shankar Purushottam Agharkar. It conducts research activities in animal sciences, microbial sciences and plant sciences.
