= Martand Singh (textile conservator) =

Indian textile conservator

- Born: 10 February 1947
- Died: 25 April 2017 (aged 70)
- Education: The Doon School; St. Stephen's College, Delhi
- Known for: Textile conservation, Conservation of Indian arts and crafts
- Mother: Sita Devi
- Relatives: Jagatjit Singh (grandfather)
- Awards: Padma Bhushan

Martand "Mapu" Singh (10 February 1947 – 25 April 2017) was an Indian textile conservator, curator, and cultural historian who championed the revival of traditional Indian textiles, weaving and dyeing traditions. He served as the director of Calico Museum of Textiles in Ahmedabad and was one of the founder members, and former head, of Indian National Trust for Art and Cultural Heritage (INTACH). He was a trustee of the Mehrangarh Museum in Jodhpur.

Singh has been described as India's "best-known textile revivalist". In a 1997 interview in The New York Times, Singh said about the Indian crafts community: "People assume that we will always have these craftspeople, but at the current rate of change, these skills may soon be a thing of the past."

== Biography ==
Singh was born in Kapurthala, a former princely state in Punjab, to Sita Devi, Maharani and Karamjit Singh Maharaja of Kapurthala, . He attended The Doon School in Dehradun, and then went to St. Stephen's College, Delhi.

In 1985, he was the co-curator, along with Diana Vreeland, of the celebrated exhibition Costumes of Royal India, at the Metropolitan Museum of Art in New York. Along with Pupul Jayakar and Rajeev Sethi, Singh documented the diversity of textiles and weaves across India, and all three were in the organising committee of the Festival of India, a state-sponsored six-month exhibition of Indian art and culture, held in London in 1982. In 2018, the Japanese designer Issey Miyake held the exhibition, Khadi: Indian Craftsmanship, Homage to Martand Singh, at his Tribeca store in New York, which came about as the textile director of Miyake Design Studio, Makiko Minagawa, had earlier worked with Singh and was greatly influenced by his efforts in textiles and design conservation.

Before his death in 2017, Singh was working as the chief consultant for the exhibition Peacock in the Desert: The Royal Arts of Jodhpur, which was displayed at Museum of Fine Arts, Houston, Seattle Art Museum and Royal Ontario Museum; the shows, which opened in 2018 after his death, were dedicated to his memory.

=== Vishwakarma exhibitions ===
Between 1982 and 1992, Singh curated a series of seven exhibitions, titled "Vishwakarma" (Hindi for "all-creating", meaning the personification of the ultimate reality, and in the current context "master artisan"), which for the first time captured the diversity of Indian textile arts under one roof. The 1981 exhibition, which brought together textiles from every Indian state, travelled to London as part of the state-sponsored cultural programme Festivals of India. The later exhibitions toured Russia, Japan, France, Italy, Sweden, China and the United States. The exhibitions, as a whole, systematically showcased India's textile heritage for the first time, and were instrumental in reviving interest in handmade textiles, weaving and dyeing traditions of the country.

== Awards ==
Singh was awarded the Padma Bhushan by the Government of India, for his contributions in the field of Indian arts and culture.

== Bibliography ==
- Singh, Martand; Chishti, Rta Kapur (1985). Saris of India: Madhya Pradesh. Wiley. ISBN 9788122401875.
- Singh, Martand; Chishti, Rta Kapur (1985). Saris of India: Bihar & West Bengal. Wiley. ISBN 9788122408300.
- Singh, Martand; Chishti, Rta Kapur (2000). Handcrafted Indian Textiles: Tradition and Beyond. Roli Books. ISBN 9788174360847.
- Singh, Martand; Chishti, Rta Kapur; Kelkar, Renuka (2010). Saris of India: Tradition and Beyond. Roli Books. ISBN 9788174363749.
