= Cedric Dover =

British Indian zoologist and writer

Cedric Cyril Dover (11 April 1904 – 1 December 1961) was a British Indian zoologist and later a writer on social and anthropological matters related to race. He preferred to be called a Eurasian rather than as an Anglo-Indian, both terms used for people of mixed ancestry. He wrote several books on race and sought an international unified action by oppressed races against prejudices.

== Life and career ==
Dover was born in Calcutta to Percy and Sophy Dover. Prominent East India Company officer James Skinner was one of his maternal ancestors. At an early age he took an interest in zoology under the influence of Thomas Nelson Annandale. After his education at St. Xaviers, St Joseph's College and the Medical College at Calcutta he worked for a while at the Indian Museum in Calcutta. At the age of 17 he wrote a booklet called "The Common Butterflies of India: An Introduction to the Study of Butterflies, and How to Collect and Preserve Them" and took an interest in butterflies. With Annandale's encouragement he joined Edinburgh University but returned without completing his studies to Calcutta and joined the Zoological Survey of India as an entomologist. Some his work was on a survey of Chilka Lake, systematics mainly of the Hymenoptera (but also dealt in Hemiptera, particularly aquatic ones, and mammals) and on applied entomology such as mosquito repellents with one formulation that he developed at the Army School of Hygiene, a mix of citronella oil and vaseline known as "Dover's Cream". He also worked in the oyster experiment station at Kuala Kurau, Perak and briefly served as a lecturer at the Indian Forest College, Dehra Dun. While in Malaya, he explored the Batu Caves from where he collected a bathynellid crustacean which he considered as a "living fossil" and was named as Parabathynella malaya while also examining the fauna living in the fluid of pitcher plants. The alga Micrasterias doveri collected from Malaya was named after him by Kalipada Biswas. The mollusc Opeas doveri Ghosh, and the pseudoscorpion Dhanus doveri Bristowe were also named after him. He married fellow zoologist Mercia Heynes-Wood and they started the periodical The New Outlook in 1925 aimed at the Anglo-Indian reader. Along with Heynes-Wood he published a catalogue of the Cicindelinae of India, including a description of a new tiger beetle species Calomera fowleri. He also published a note on the history of entomology in India in 1922.

The Dovers had three children but he separated from his family and travelled to Egypt before finally settling in London in 1934, where he worked with V. K. Krishna Menon's India League. During World War II he served in the Royal Army Ordnance Corps and after demobilization, he became a visiting lecturer on anthropology at Fisk University, Tennessee between 1946 and 1949. His affiliation with communism made it difficult for him to find employment in the US but he was briefly a graduate faculty at the New School for Social Research, New York. He moved back to London in 1949 and in this period wrote admiringly of Stalinism, seeing it as a driver for "the movement towards coloured unity" in his book Hell in the Sunshine. This helped earn him a place in George Orwell's list of people who were unsuitable for writing propaganda against communism. Orwell described Dover as a “very dishonest, venal person” whose “main emphasis” was “anti-white (especially anti-USA)” and "reliably pro-Russian on all major issues." Dover also took a great interest in eugenics but gave up his ideas after he read Julian Huxley's We Europeans (1935) which critiqued race science. Dover also became a member of The Men of the Trees, an organization involved in afforestation and founded by Richard St. Barbe Baker in 1924 and edited its journal Trees. In 1954 he was chosen as a delegate to visit China. He married twice again in later life and died from heart failure in East Surrey Hospital in 1961.

== Writings ==
Dover published extensively on zoological topics until around 1934 when his focus shifted increasingly to matters of race. He also had an interest in writing and poetry. He also wrote several obituaries of friends and influences, including of T.N. Annandale, whom he called the "father of freshwater biology in the east". Dover published as many as 300 publications but only a few books including:

- The Kingdom of Earth (1931)
- Half-Caste (1937)
- Know This of Race (1939)
- Hell in the Sunshine (1943)
- American Negro Art (1960)
