= SS Kaisar-I-Hind =

P&O ocean liner

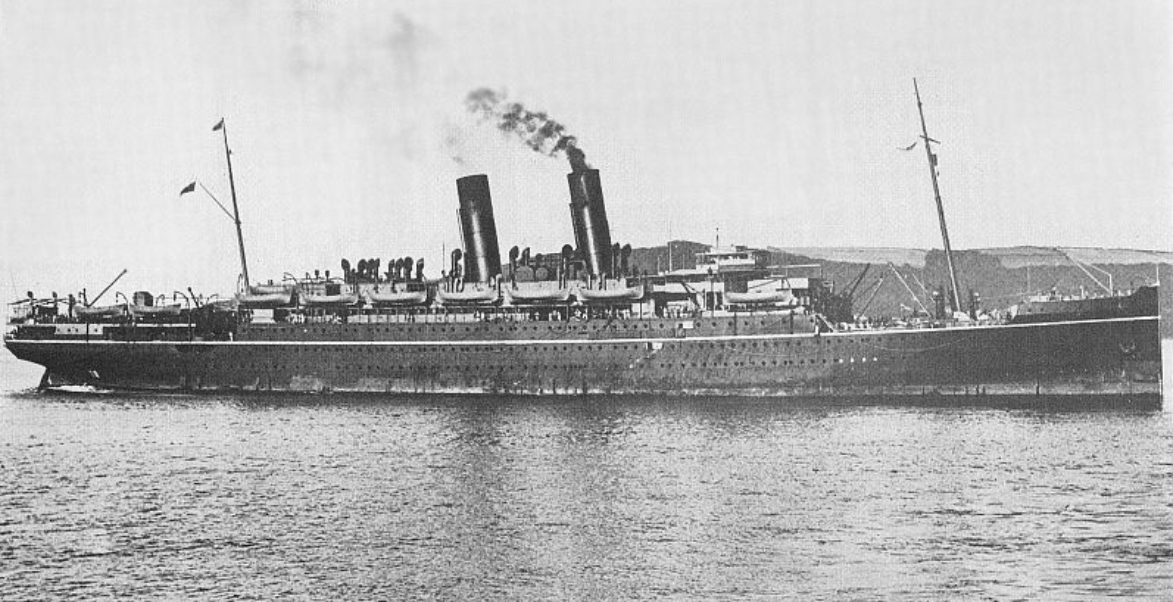
- The Kaisar-i-Hind arriving in the port

History

United Kingdom
- Name: Kaisar-i-Hind
- Namesake: Victoria, Empress of India
- Owner: P&O
- Port of registry: Greenock
- Route: Tilbury – Bombay
- Builder: Caird & Company, Greenock
- Cost: £363,176
- Yard number: 327
- Launched: 28 June 1914
- Completed: 1 October 1914
- Refit: 1926
- Identification: UK official number 128653; until 1933: code letters JGTR; by 1918: wireless call sign MSI; by 1930: call sign GLVN
- Fate: Scrapped 1938

General characteristics
- Type: ocean liner
- Tonnage: 11,430 GRT, 5,989 NRT
- Length: 520.0 ft (158.5 m)
- Beam: 61.2 ft (18.7 m)
- Draught: 29 ft 0 in (8.84 m)
- Depth: 33.1 ft (10.1 m)
- Decks: 4
- Installed power: 1,964 NHP, 14,000 ihp
- Propulsion: 2 × quadruple-expansion engines; 2 × screws
- Speed: 18 1/2 knots (34 km/h)
- Capacity: passengers: 315 × 1st class; 333 × 2nd class; cargo: 222,980 cubic feet (6,314 m^{3})
- Crew: 332

SS Kaisar-i-Hind was a P&O ocean liner that was launched in Scotland in 1914 and scrapped in England in 1938. Kaisar-i-Hind means "Empress of India". She was the second P&O ship to bear this name. The first was launched in 1878 and scrapped in 1898.

In the First World War Kaisar-i-Hind was a troopship. She survived five torpedo attacks by U-boats.

== Building ==
Caird & Company of Greenock on the River Clyde built the ship as yard number 327. When a Miss Edith Cole launched her on 28 June 1914, the ship still lacked a name. The ship was named during fitting out, and made her sea trials on 1 October 1914. She cost £363,176, which at the time was the highest price P&O had ever paid for a ship.

Kaisar-i-Hind's registered length was 520.0 ft (158.5 m), her beam was 61.2 ft (18.7 m), and her depth was 33.1 ft (10.1 m). Her tonnages were 11,430 GRT and 5,989 NRT. Her holds had space for 222,980 cubic feet (6,314 m^{3}) of cargo. She had berths for 648 passengers: 315 in first class, and 333 in second class. Each passenger cabin was cooled by its own electric fan. She had a crew of 332: 138 Europeans and 194 lascars.

The ship had twin screws, each driven by a quadruple-expansion steam engine. The combined power of her twin engines was rated at 1,964 NHP or 14,000 ihp, and gave her a speed of 18 1/2 knots (34 km/h).

== Maiden voyage ==
P&O registered Kaisar-i-Hind at Greenock. Her United Kingdom official number was 128653 and her code letters were JGTR. She was equipped with wireless telegraphy. Her call sign was MSI.

The ship's route was from Tilbury to Bombay (now Mumbai) via Plymouth. On her maiden voyage she steamed from Plymouth to Bombay in 17 days, 20 hours and 52 minutes, setting a new record.

== First World War ==
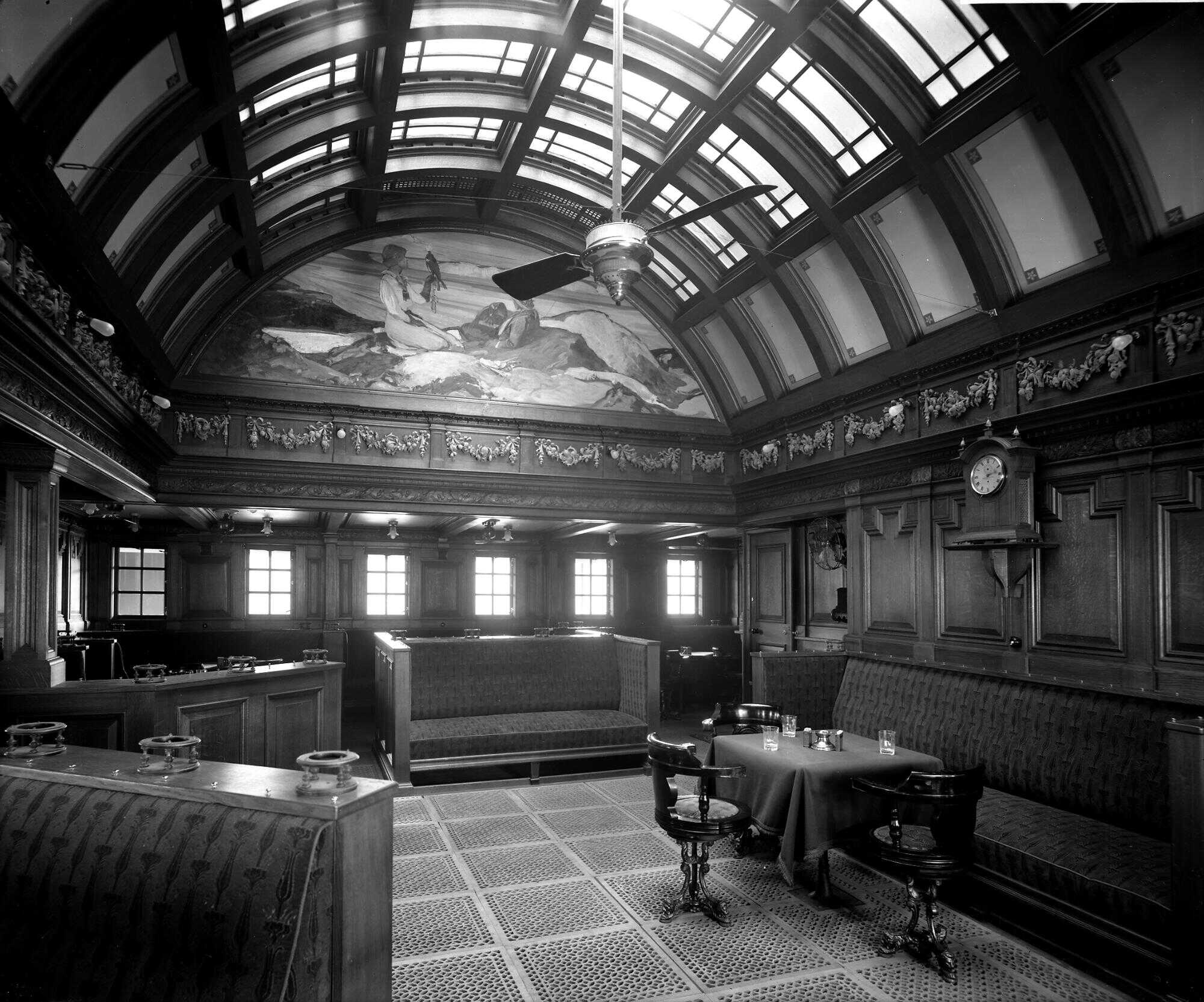
Kaisar-i-Hind's First Class smoking room

The First World War began two months before Kaisar-i-Hind entered service. For much of the war she was a troopship. She carried British, Indian and French troops, mainly to the Mediterranean. For trooping service her number of lifeboats was greatly increased, with a second row of boats superimposed on either side of her boat deck.

During the war she survived five torpedo attacks. The first was on 23 March 1916, between Crete and Malta, when she was carrying the Viceroy of India, Lord Chelmsford, and his family. The second was on 17 June 1917, west of Gibraltar. The third was on 17 July 1917, southwest of the Isles of Scilly. The fourth was on 18 December 1917, west of Gibraltar. In each attack, the U-boat commanders seem to have under-estimated her speed, as Kaisar-i-Hind was faster than other P&O ships of her era.

On 22 September 1918 the ship was attacked by a U-boat for the fifth time. According to official records the torpedo missed again. According to P&O tradition a torpedo did hit her this time, and dented her plates, but failed to detonate.

On 15 October 1918 T. E. Lawrence embarked on the ship at Port Said. He disembarked at Taranto in Italy, whence he continued his journey home by train as far as Le Havre, and then by ferry to England, where he arrived on 24 October. In 1919 the ship continued trooping; repatriating troops to Australia and India. She returned to civilian service in 1920.

== Civilian service ==
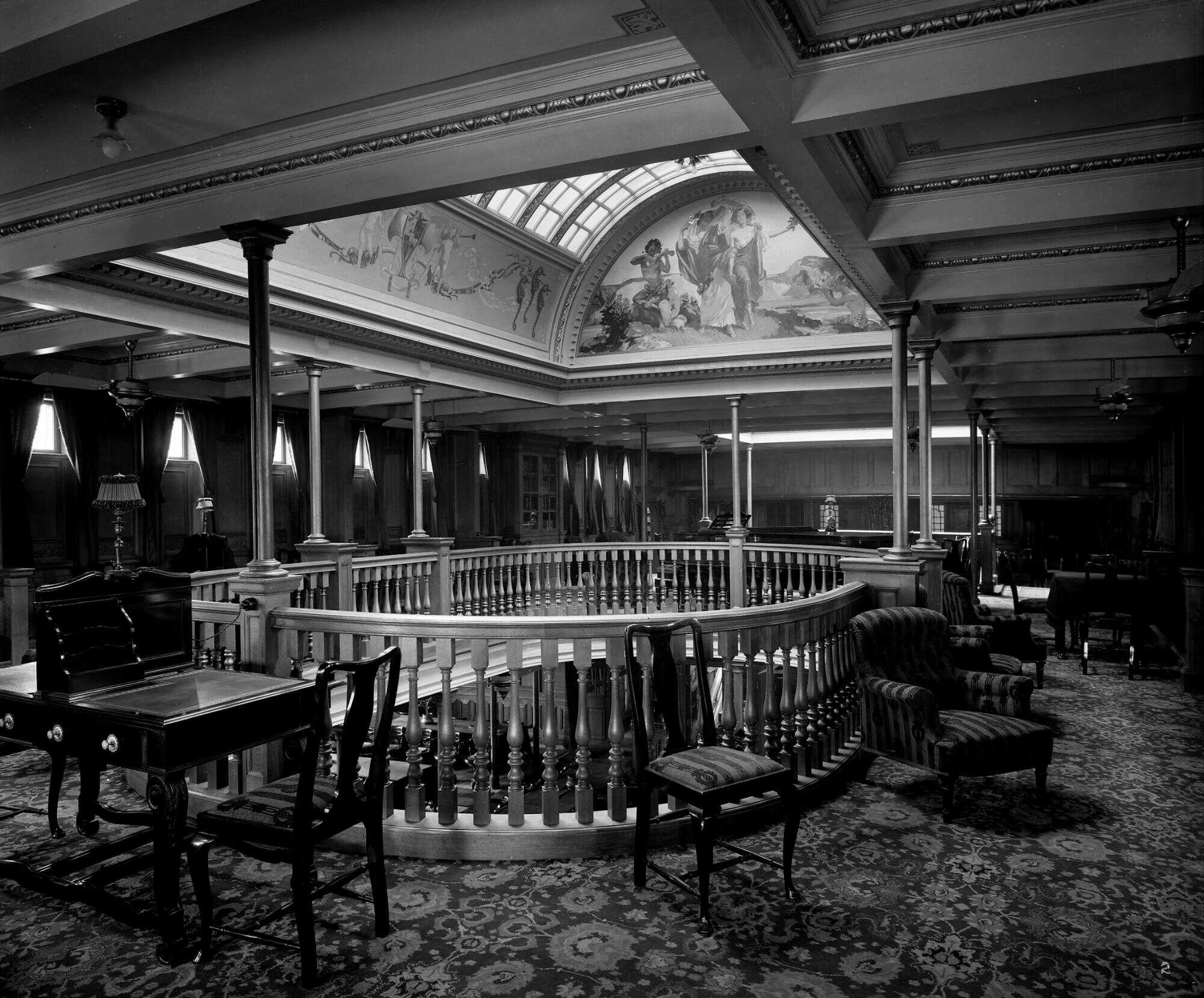
Kaisar-i-Hind's First Class music room

In 1921 Cunard Line chartered Kaisar-i-Hind for at least one round trip between Southampton and New York, for which she was unofficially renamed Emperor of India. The American Tourist Agency chartered her for a cruise to Norway, but her design for service in a hot climate proved unsuitable. During the cruise an explosion in her stokehold killed three lascar stokers and badly scalded four engineers.

In 1922 Kaisar-i-Hind returned to P&O service. in 1926 she was refitted. In 1929 P&O changed transferred her to its Far East route. David Niven, then newly commissioned as a second lieutenant in the Highland Light Infantry, sailed on her from Tilbury to Malta.

By 1930 Kaisar-i-Hind's call sign was GLVN. By 1934 this had superseded her code letters.

On 22 May 1930 the ship lost her port screw in the Red Sea between Aden and Port Said. The damage was inspected by a diver, after which she completed her voyage to Tilbury at reduced speed. On 1 November 1931 the ship dragged her anchor at Malta, colliding with the Italian ship Città di Trieste and sinking several lighters.

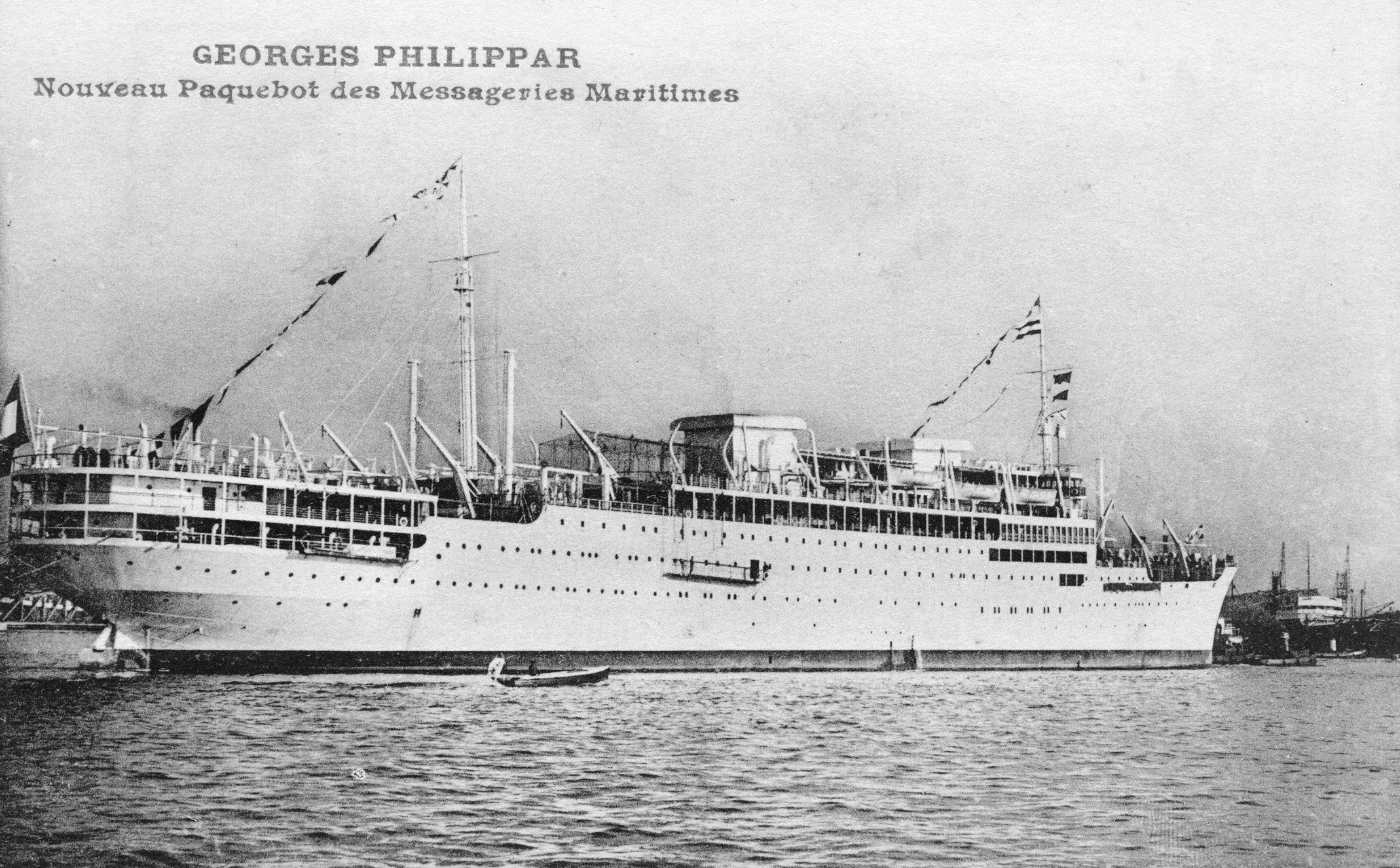
The liner Georges Philippar

On 16 May 1932 the French liner Georges Philippar caught fire in the Indian Ocean. Kaisar-i-Hind was one of several ships that went to her aid. Kaisar-i-Hind patrolled in search of lifeboats and liferafts believed to be making for the coast, but found none.

On 1 July 1932 Kaisar-i-Hind called at Tangier. She was the first P&O ship ever to serve the port.

On 21 April 1938 the ship reached Plymouth flying a paying-off pennant 72 feet (22 m) long. The next day she reached King George V Dock, London, for the last time. On 26 April Hughes Bolckow bought her for £28,500 for scrap. On 29 May she reached Blyth, Northumberland, where she was broken up.

== Bibliography ==
- Haws, Duncan; Rabson, Stephen (1978). The Ships of the P&O, Orient and Blue Anchor Lines. Merchant Fleets in Profile. Vol. 1. Cambridge: Patrick Stephens Ltd. ISBN 0-85059-319-0.
- Lloyd's Register of Shipping. Vol. II.–Steamers. London: Lloyd's Register of Shipping. 1917 – via Internet Archive.
- The Marconi Press Agency Ltd (1918). The Year Book of Wireless Telegraphy and Telephony. London: The Wireless Press, Ltd.
- Mercantile Navy List. London. 1930 – via Crew List Index Project.
