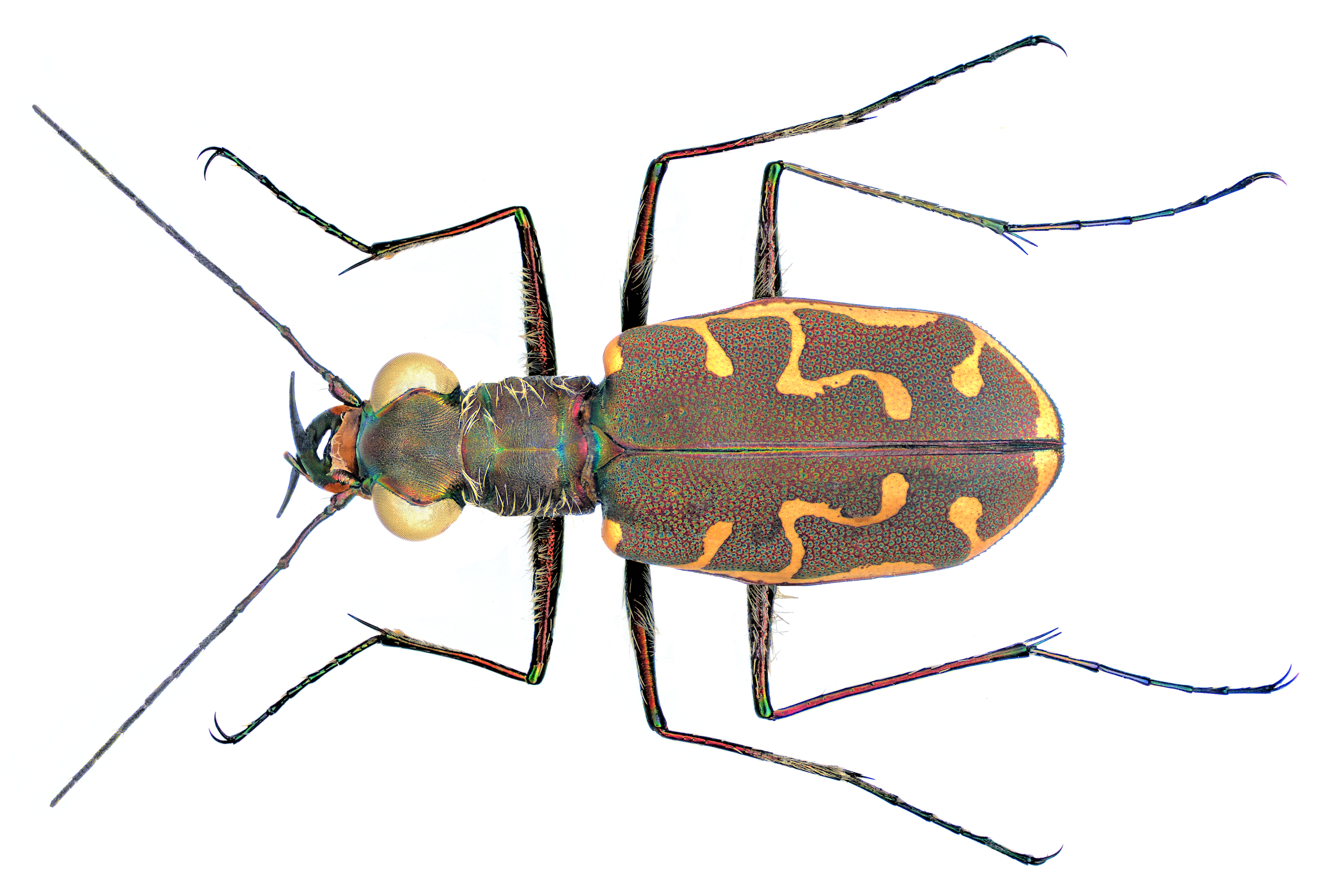

Scientific classification
- Kingdom: Animalia
- Phylum: Arthropoda
- Clade: Pancrustacea
- Class: Insecta
- Order: Coleoptera
- Suborder: Adephaga
- Family: Cicindelidae
- Genus: Cicindela
- Species: C. angulata

Binomial name
- Cicindela angulata Fabricius, 1798

Synonyms
- Calomera angulata; Cicindela boyeri Blanchard, 1842; Cicindela leguilloui Guérin-Méneville, 1841; Cicindela arcuata Kollar, 1836; Cicindela sumatrensis Herbst, 1806; Calomera niponensis Bates, 1883

= Cicindela angulata =

Species of beetle

Cicindela angulata is a species of tiger beetle. This species is found in Afghanistan, China, Japan, Taiwan, Pakistan, Nepal, India, Sri Lanka, Thailand, Vietnam, Indonesia (including Borneo) and the Philippines. The habitat of this species consists of reservoir banks with sandy texture and specific climatic and soil conditions.

Adults have an average body length of 11 mm and are reddish-brown or bronze with pale-yellow maculae and copper-green pits.

== Subspecies ==
- Cicindela angulata angulata (Afghanistan, China, Taiwan, Pakistan, Nepal, India, Thailand, Vietnam, Indonesia, Borneo, Philippines)
- Cicindela angulata niponensis Bates, 1883 (Japan)
