= Textile conservator =

Museum occupation

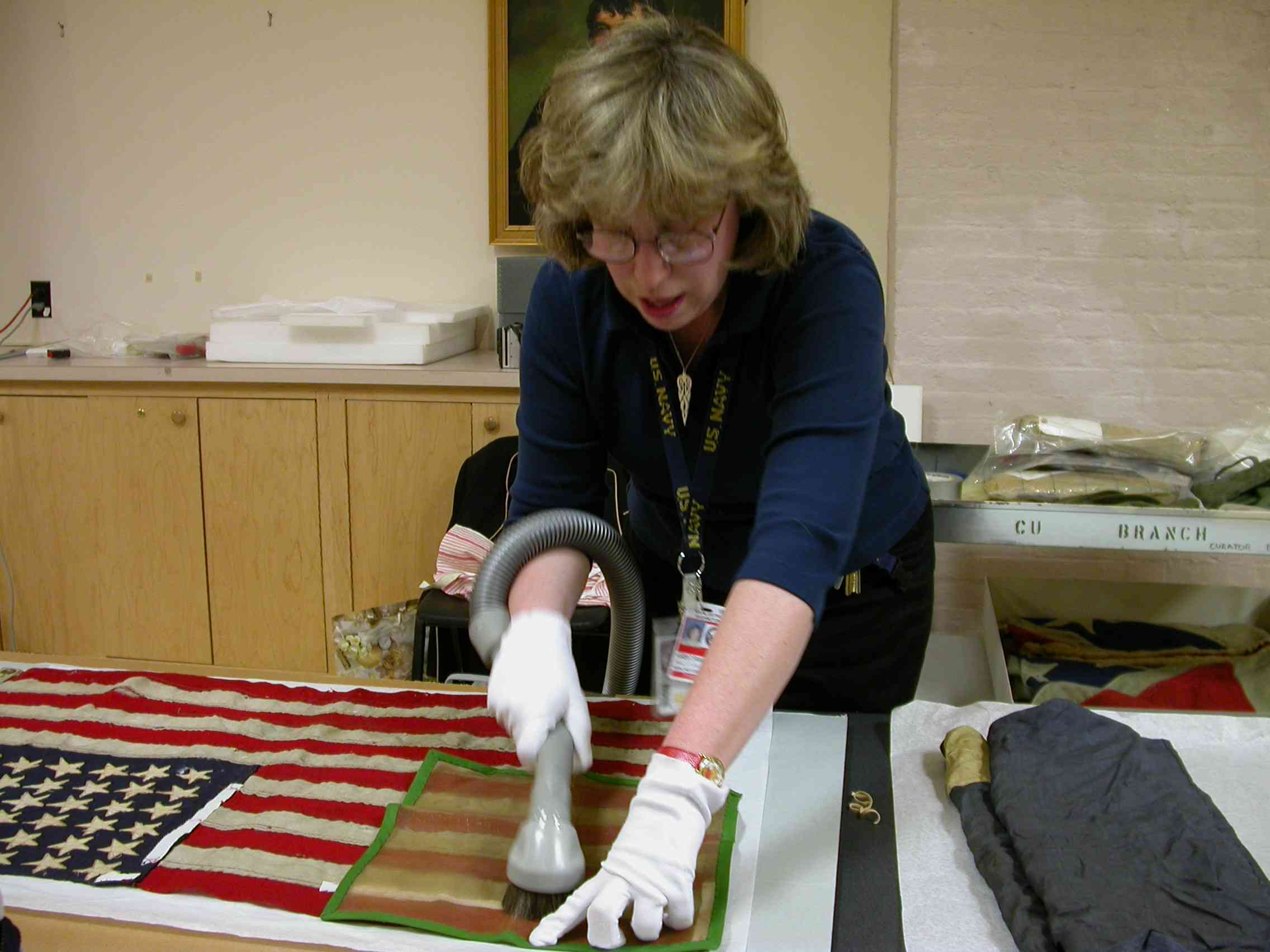
Karen France works to clean a flag at the Naval Historical Center in Washington, D.C

A textile conservator is a conservator-restorer charged with the care, treatment, research, and preservation of textiles. Issues addressed by a textile conservator are generally related to the field of textile preservation, and include damage caused to textiles by: light, mold and mildew, insects, cleaning, surface cleaning, washing, mounting for display, and storage. Textiles are among the most fragile artifacts, as they are susceptible to damage from atmospheric pollutants, moisture, biological organisms, and environmental changes and care varies with size, shape, material, and condition issues, all of which a textile conservator must be well versed.

A textile conservator may be employed by a museum, other institution, or be an independent contractor. Most textile conservators have or will be in private practice at one time in their career. In the current professional climate, "funding cuts have led to a reduction in the number of permanent jobs available in textile conservation and a contract culture exists in many museums". A positive result "of the economic constraints on modern textile conservation is that conservators have developed a more reflective practice and think in a creative and flexible way of how to balance the key issues of access and preservation in their work."

== Responsibilities and duties ==
Textile conservators are responsible for condition assessment, treatment, and preventive measures performed on objects to preserve cultural heritage. Some conservators "have the added responsibility of acting as couriers of these objects to loan venues or with touring exhibitions". Textile conservators may also construct storage solutions or display mounts, such as dress forms.

Also of note is that textile conservators in museum or private practice, generally, "consult not only their colleagues but every stakeholder involved with the future of the object".

=== Preventive measures ===
Textile conservators are charged with caring for and protecting textiles from potential or further damage "to prevent unnecessary deterioration of an object so that it remains available for research or exhibition. Any treatment should respect the historic and artistic integrity of an object and should therefore be kept as minimal as possible". All treatments should be capable of being reversed or retreated with minimal intervention. Preventive conservation includes "measures and treatments aimed at creating an optimum environment for storing and exhibiting objects, serving to avoid or delay the natural degradation of objects". These include climate control, temperature and relative humidity; light control; control of environmental pollution; pest management; and appropriate storage methods and materials. Preventive conservation "is sometimes referred to as remedial conservation".

=== Treatment protocol ===
The typical protocol for the treatment and conservation of textiles includes examination, documentation, research, treatment, and documentation again.

A textile conservator's first task is to write a treatment proposal that includes an examination of the object and condition issues. A typical report includes a technical description of an object, historical data, information on the object's present state, recommendations for treatment, and expected results of treatment. Extensive written and photographic documentation is made. During treatment, photo documentation is also maintained, as well as after. After treatment, a final treatment report is completed and includes recommendations for continued care.

Textile conservators must be able to treat all types of media used. As textiles may include additional adornments, such as glass beads or metal fringes, conservators must have a wide knowledge of preservation techniques for all types of media and material.

=== Tools ===
For examination, handling and/or treatment, equipment can include: gloves (cotton, vinyl, latex, or nitrile), a lab coat, a respirator, safety glasses, a magnifier; binocular microscope; magnifying glass; microscope; and other lab related equipment.

For treatment, tools can include: sewing supplies, such as needles, pins, thimble, scissors, dress makers tape; various adhesives; tweezers; brushes, "Large, medium, and small, in all kinds of shapes and in all kinds of bristle"; irons; steam table; ironing boards; vacuums with a variable, controllable suction like the Nilfisk vacuum cleaner; embroidery frames; wet cleaning supplies; dry cleaning supplies; insect repellents; or materials for restoration, like an aplix, cotton fabric, non-woven interfacing, nylon net or silk crepeline (both of which can be dyed to match the color of the object and used as support), tetex, and velcro.

For storage, equipment can include: acid-free materials, such as tissue paper, tubes, and boxes; and flat storage mats; centrofoam; correx; foamboard/kapaline; etamine; ethafoam; plastazote; active carbon, as powder or on cloth; Art Sorb/ProSorb; Desi Pak; Japanese paper; nylon fishing line; oxygen absorbers or oxygen scavengers; silica gel; or zip-lock bags, sometimes perforated.

Additionally, a large workspace with large surfaces for expansive tapestries and a well-ventilated space, perhaps with hood and extractor fan, is necessary. Some conservators and projects require a glass-topped table that can be lit from underneath. Use of computers and digital imaging "enable conservators to illustrate the possible outcomes of treatment proposals and document the condition of an object with more clarity".

=== Ethics ===
A textile conservator, and conservators in general, ought to adhere to the ethical code of conservation. This code, generally accepted by professional organizations, was established by the American Institute of Conservation (AIC) and addresses standards, methods and principles on the form of the Code of Ethics and Guidelines for Practice. The ethical code was approved by AIC Fellows and Professional Associates through a mail vote in 1994. It addresses conservators keeping current with standard techniques and practices, as well as, performing treatments that are reversible, necessary, and within the conservator's ability. The Institute of Conservation London, U.K. also has Professional Guidelines.

== Knowledge, abilities, and skills ==
Some of the basic knowledge, skills, and abilities needed by textile conservators are:

- Knowledge of fibers (classification, chemistry and physics)
- Knowledge of textile techniques (spinning, weaving, binding, tapestries, knitting, knotting, dying, printing, and finishes)
- Knowledge of textile degradation
- Knowledge of environmental effects
- Knowledge of insect and fungi identification and disinfestation or disinfection methods, including integrated pest management (IPM)
- Knowledge of proper storage, storage systems, and materials
- Ability to determine object's fragility
- Ability to perform risk analysis
- Sewing abilities/skills
- Object handling training and skills
- Project planning and management skills
- Negotiating skills and financial acumen

== Education and training ==
The following North American institutions offer graduate degrees, Master's and/or PhD, in conservation: Institute of Fine Arts Conservation Center at New York University (NYU); Art Conservation Department at the University of Delaware in cooperation with the Winterthur Museum; the Art Conservation Program at Queen's University in Ontario, Canada; and the Conservation Analytical Laboratory at the Smithsonian Institution in cooperation with The Johns Hopkins University.

A Master's degree in textile chemistry or textile engineering may be offered at other universities and colleges.

The following programs offer specialization in costume conservation: Fashion Institute of Technology, New York; University of Rhode Island; and the Centre for Textile Conservation at the University of Glasgow.

== Examples of projects ==
Costume conservation of Gone With the Wind (1939) gowns, all designed by Walter Plunkett, in the David O. Selznick archive of the Harry Ransom Center at the University of Texas at Austin took place in preparation for temporary exhibition. A textile conservator and other museum staff worked to conserve and preserve the gowns.

== Organizations and professional societies ==
Textile conservators often join an assortment of professional organizations to suit their varied needs and specializations. These organizations may include those dedicated to conservation, textiles, or a related field. The following list is by no means comprehensive, as there are numerous regional, national, and international associations and organizations.

=== Organizations and societies dedicated to textiles ===
- The Textile Society of America, Inc.
- American Association of Textile Chemists & Colorists
- Costume Society of America

=== Organizations and societies dedicated to conservation in general ===
- American Institute for Conservation of Historic and Artistic Works (AIC)
- International Council of Museums – Committee for Conservation(ICOM-CC)
- International Institute for Conservation of Historic and Artistic Works (ICC)
- Canadian Association for Conservation (CAC)
- Getty Conservation Institute
- International Centre for the Study of Preservation and Restoration of Cultural Property (ICCROM)
- Heritage Preservation, formerly the National Institute for the Conservation of Cultural Property, Inc. (NIC)

== See also ==
- Archival science
- Conservation science
- Conservation and restoration of cultural property: Object conservation
- Conservator-restorer
- Collection (museum)
- Collections care
- Heritage science
- Integrated pest management
- Preservation (library and archive)
