= Shankar Purushottam Agharkar =

Indian university teacher and plant morphologist (1884-1960)

S.P. Agharkar
- Born: 18 November 1884; Malvan
- Died: 2 September 1960 (aged 75)
- Known for: Agharkar Research Institute

Shankar Purushottam Agharkar (18 November 1884 – 2 September 1960) was an Indian Morphologist. Agharkar obtained his PhD degree (1919) from the University of Berlin, Germany. His specialization was in Plant Morphology. He was the Ghosh Professor of Botany (1920–47) at the University of Calcutta; and Founder Director (1946–60) of Maharashtra Association for the Cultivation of Science. He is one of the leading botanists of India. He explored biodiversity of Western Ghats where he came across a species of freshwater jellyfish, which was until then only known to be found in Africa. These findings were published in scientific journal Nature in 1912. Dr. Annandale, the Superintendent of the Indian Museum in Kolkata, helped Dr. Agharkar in his further endeavours to collect, preserve and conduct microscopic examinations of animal and plant specimens. The institute ARI, Pune has been named after him.

== Early life ==
He was born in 1884. Since childhood he was fascinated by plants and animals which led him to discover a new species of jellyfish. He was known for his accurate information and detailed observations.

== Education ==
Later C.V.Raman recommended him for the Ghosh professorship at Calcutta (now known as Kolkata). He went to Germany to obtain the PhD degree from the University of Berlin in May 1914 but was imprisoned as the World War I broke out. However he completed his PhD in jail and returned to India.

== Awards and honours ==
- Maharashtra Association for the Cultivation of Science Research Institute, was renamed in 1992 as the Agharkar Research Institute (ARI) in honour the Founder Director.
- Professor Albert Seward Memorial Lectureship by Birbal Sahni Institute of Palaeobotany – 1955
- Member of Indian Botanical Society (President) - 1923
- President, Botany Section of Indian Science Congress - 1924
- Indian Science Congress Medal of Asiatic Society - 1934
- Member of Indian Society of Soil Science (Honorary Secretary) - 1935–1940
- President of Botanical Society of Bengal - 1940–1945
- President of Indian Ecological Society - 1940–1945
- Secretary of Asiatic Society - 1943–1945
- Vice President of Asiatic Society - 1945–1946
- President of Brihan Maharashtra Parishad- 1943

== See also ==
- Agharkar Research Institute
