= Report on Indian Programmes (1943) =

A Report on Indian Programmes was published in 1943, after Laurence Brander had been tasked to investigate the impact of BBC Radio programmes on Indians in India. The data was compiled by Ahmed Ali after conducting surveys of Indians across India. It claimed that George Orwell had poor approval ratings.
