= Beau Friedlander =

American writer, publisher and media consultant

Beau Friedlander is an American writer, publisher, and media consultant. He was the founder of Context Books, an award-winning small press, an editor-in-chief at Air America and garnered notoriety as a provocateur for progressive causes.

First published in the early 1990s in the United Kingdom, most notably in the May Anthology of Oxford and Cambridge Poetry edited by Nobel laureate Seamus Heaney (under the name E.B. Friedlander), Friedlander's writing has appeared in many publications, including Harper's Magazine, The New York Times, Time, the Los Angeles Times, The Paris Review, Lapham's Quarterly, and the Huffington Post, where he is a regular contributor.

== Education ==
Beau Friedlander received a B.A. in Literature and Languages from Bennington College, a M.A. in English Romanticism from Oxford University and a M.Phil. in Comparative Literature and Scandinavian Studies from Columbia University.

== Career ==
In 1998, Friedlander started Context Books, an independent press. He was twenty-seven.

In 1999, Friedlander and Context Books came to public attention when he acquired a manuscript from Theodore J. Kaczynski, the Unabomber. The book, in which Kaczynski argued that he was not insane, as his family had claimed during his trial, was ready to be published by Context Books when Kaczynski refused to paraphrase some letters which he did not own the copyright to. The book was never published because of these copyright issues.

Context Books published several award-winning works of literary fiction by authors including David Means, David Marshall Chan, and Daniel Quinn. Nonfiction authors included Derrick Jensen and John Bonifaz. The publishing house won several national awards, including The Los Angeles Times Book Prize (2000) for Assorted Fire Events.

The New York Times singled out two of the anti-war books published by Context, stating they, “emerged from and then codified opposition to the war in Iraq.”

The first of these books was War on Iraq: What Team Bush Doesn't Want You to Know by William Rivers Pitt. It was published in at least 10 languages in editions worldwide, and became an international bestseller—including an appearance on the New York Times extended bestseller list.

Target Iraq by Norman Solomon and Reese Erlich was a national bestseller. It was cited by whistleblower Katharine Gun as a catalyst in her decision to leak a 2003 NSA memo revealing illegal activity on the part of the United States to create diplomatic pressure to generate support for the war.

In 2008, Friedlander became the editor-in-chief at Air America, the progressive radio network with hosts Rachel Maddow, Al Franken, Randi Rhodes and Marc Maron among others.

Beau Friedlander's writing has appeared in Harper's Magazine, The New York Times, Time, the Los Angeles Times, Lapham's Quarterly, The Paris Review, The Huffington Post, the Air America website, The Dominion, as well as several anthologies and journals.

=== Glenn Beck Controversy ===
Friedlander was at the center of controversy on the internet in 2010 when he publicly offered to broker a deal for $100,000 on the Huffington Post for anyone who could produce a sex tape of Glenn Beck. Despite his initial stated intention for the article to be a satire in the context of Andrew Breitbart's offer of $100,000 for an archive of progressive listserv messages, the article created a firestorm which led to the Huffington Post's pulling the article and requiring Friedlander's posts to be reviewed by an editor before being publicly viewable.

Friedlander later posted an apology, stating: "I was actually trying to mimic what I saw as the way right wingers go about these matters, and by misapprehending the way they do things, I went too far. (I offered to broker a deal for anyone who had damaging media pertaining to Glenn Beck.) First, I owe Glenn Beck an apology. I crossed the line. On the off chance something comes in over the transom...scratch that; I'll delete the email account. Problem solved. I meant to tilt at a windmill in the post, and I planted my lance in the dirt."

=== Books ===
Friedlander has co-written several books including Uncle Charlie with Marc Asnin (2012), Swiped: How to Protect Yourself in a World Full of Scammers, Phishers, and Identity Thieves with Adam Levin (2015), and The Butler's Child, an autobiography by Lewis M. Steel (2016).

=== Board Memberships ===
He became a board member of the Evergreen Review in 2011.

== What the Hack podcast ==
Friedlander co-hosted a weekly podcast called What the Hack with Adam Levin with host Adam K. Levin and co-host Travis Taylor, which featured guests and experts who discuss their experiences with scams, identity theft, privacy, and other cyber-related issues. Notable guests have included Al Franken, Daily Show correspondent Roy Wood Jr. and others.

In 2023, What the Hack won two Signal Awards, a Gold AVA Award, and was nominated for a Webby

In 2025, the podcast was acquired by DeleteMe, with Friedlander continuing as the sole host.

== Personal life ==
Beau Friedlander has two children from a previous marriage. He is originally from Redding, Connecticut where he currently lives with model and photographer Guinevere Van Seenus.
