= Context Books =

Defunct American independent publishing house

Context Books was an American independent publishing house founded by Beau Friedlander that featured often controversial and critically acclaimed titles from authors such as Derrick Jensen, Daniel Quinn, David Means, and William Rivers Pitt which operated from 1998 to 2004.

== Founding ==
Context Books originated as Context Media, through which Friedlander provided publishing and packaging services for a variety of clients with the idea in mind of raising enough capital to begin publishing titles that would have had difficulty finding interest from mainstream publishers.

"I hated big publishing's complete and utter disregard for authors," Friedlander said of the impetus. "...I want to publish the revolution."

== Truth Vs. Lies and the United States Vs. Theodore John Kaczynski ==
Context Books first gained national notice with the decision to attempt to publish the memoirs of Theodore Kaczynski, who had written them from imprisonment in a Colorado Penitentiary. The memoir, entitled 'Truth Vs. Lies' did not acknowledge the anti-technological bombing campaign for which he was convicted, but rather to address the testimony from family and acquaintances that he was mentally ill.

While developing this manuscript and preparing it for publication, Context released a companion book written by Vermont Law Professor Michael Mello called "The United States of America Versus Theodore John Kaczynski: Ethics, Power, and the Invention of the Unabomber." Rather than an analysis of the Kaczynski's crimes, Mello criticized the legal processes surrounding his prosecution, where he was denied the ability to represent himself and was instead representing as being severely mentally ill. Mello, who had also acted as an adviser to Kaczynski's pretrial defense team drew parallels to the non-trial with John Brown's raid at Harper's Ferry.

Despite the heavy media attention brought both to the case as well as to the fledgling Context Books, Truth Vs. Lies was scrapped pre-publication due to copyright issues and ongoing disagreements between Friedlander and Kaczynski. "Kaczynski was uncooperative and expressed himself in ways that made it impossible for the book to be published by Context, or by anyone else," said Friedlander in a statement to the press.

== The 2000s ==
The national attention and controversy surrounding Truth Vs. Lies gave Context Books enough of a spotlight to acquire new authors, starting with environmentalist Derrick Jensen's long-form essay A Language Older Than Words, which went on to be one of the company's most popular titles. The themes of questioning industrial civilization, environmentalism, and humankind's role and responsibilities continued with the publication of author Daniel Quinn's books The Man Who Grew Young and After Dachau in 2001, and The Holy in 2002.

Context Books also began to seek out literary works for publication, including David Means's Assorted Fire Events, a set of short stories which won the Los Angeles Times Book Prize, and was a finalist for the National Book Critics Circle Award, as well as Mind the Doors by Russian author Zinovy Zinik, and Goblin Fruit: Stories by David Marshall Chan, which was a Los Angeles Times Book Prize finalist and a NYPL Young Lions finalist.

== Iraq War opposition ==
Context Books once again found national notoriety with the short book / political pamphlet War on Iraq: What Team Bush Doesn't Want You to Know in 2002 by William Rivers Pitt and former UN weapons inspector Scott Ritter, arguing that the claims of Iraq's stockpiles of "weapons of mass destruction" were highly suspect. The title was regarded as a stand-out during the widespread debate, argument, and protest surrounding the pending U.S. invasion of Iraq, and was referred to as "the most comprehensive independent analysis of the state of knowledge about Iraq's weapons programmes until the new team of inspectors went back." The title shipped over 100,000 copies, and made many best-seller lists.

Following the success of War on Iraq, Context Books followed up with two further books: Target Iraq written by Norman Solomon, Reese Erlich, and a foreword by Sean Penn, and Frontier Justice by Scott Ritter.

Target Iraq was later cited by Katharine Gun, a British translator working for the Government Communications Headquarters (GCHQ), as one of the primary motivations to leak a 2003 NSA memo detailing illegal activities by the United States in its diplomatic push for the invasion of Iraq.

== Bankruptcy and eventual closure ==
The 9/11 attacks and Context Books' office location in lower Manhattan created a massive financial setback for the company, which lost phone access for three months and found two of its titles released in September 2001 to languish. The company never fully recovered from the setback and declared Chapter 11 bankruptcy in November 2002, and then shifted to involuntary Chapter 7 bankruptcy in December 2003.
