= Sustainable living =

Lifestyle

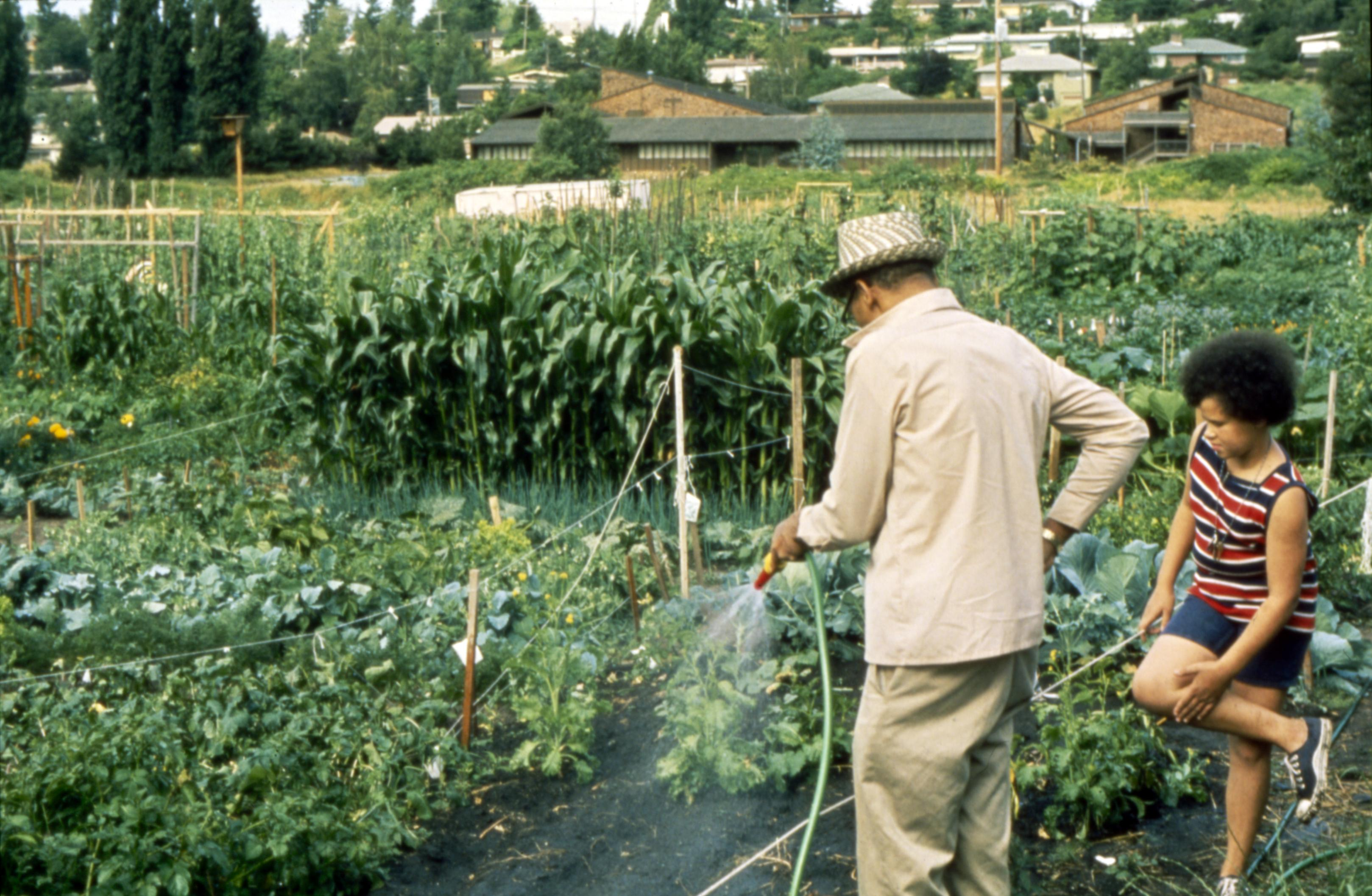
An example of urban gardening in Seattle

Sustainable living describes a lifestyle that attempts to reduce the use of Earth's natural resources by an individual or society. Its practitioners often attempt to reduce their ecological footprint (including their carbon footprint) by altering their home designs and methods of transportation, energy consumption and diet. Its proponents aim to conduct their lives in ways that are consistent with sustainability, naturally balanced, and respectful of humanity's symbiotic relationship with the Earth's natural ecology. The practice and general philosophy of ecological living closely follows the overall principles of sustainable development.

One approach to sustainable living, exemplified by small-scale urban transition towns and rural ecovillages, seeks to create self-reliant communities based on principles of simple living, which maximize self-sufficiency, particularly in food production. These principles, on a broader scale, underpin the concept of a bioregional economy.

== Definition ==
The three pillars of sustainability.

Sustainable living is fundamentally the application of sustainability to lifestyle choices and decisions. One conception of sustainable living expresses what it means in triple-bottom-line terms as meeting present ecological, societal, and economic needs without compromising these factors for future generations. Another broader conception describes sustainable living in terms of four interconnected social domains: economics, ecology, politics, and culture. In the first conception, sustainable living can be described as living within the innate carrying capacities defined by these factors. In the second or Circles of Sustainability conception, sustainable living can be described as negotiating the relationships of needs within limits across all the interconnected domains of social life, including consequences for future human generations and non-human species.

Sustainable design and sustainable development are critical factors to sustainable living. Sustainable design encompasses the development of appropriate technology, which is a staple of sustainable living practices. Sustainable development in turn is the use of these technologies in infrastructure. Sustainable architecture and agriculture are the most common examples of this practice.

Lester R. Brown, a prominent environmentalist and founder of the Worldwatch Institute and Earth Policy Institute, describes sustainable living in the twenty-first century as "shifting to a renewable energy-based, reuse/recycle economy with a diversified transport system." Anitra Nelson notes that the Degrowth movement has "pointed to ‘growth’ and ‘growth economies’ as the source of inequities and unsustainabilities" with the result that advocates call for "a radical reduction in production and consumption, greater citizen participation in politics, and more diversity, especially within ecological systems and landscapes, along with a flourishing of creativity, care, and commoning — using renewable energy and materials. Derrick Jensen ("the poet-philosopher of the ecological movement"), a celebrated American author, radical environmentalist and prominent critic of mainstream environmentalism argues that "industrial civilization is not and can never be sustainable". From this statement, the natural conclusion is that sustainable living is at odds with industrialization. Thus, practitioners of the philosophy potentially face the challenge of living in an industrial society and adapting alternative norms, technologies, or practices.

== History ==
- 1954 The publication of Living the Good Life by Helen and Scott Nearing marked the beginning of the modern-day sustainable living movement. The publication paved the way for the "back-to-the-land movement" in the late 1960s and early 1970s.
- 1962 The publication of Silent Spring by Rachel Carson marked another major milestone for the sustainability movement.
- 1972 Donella Meadows wrote the international bestseller The Limits to Growth, which reported on a study of long-term global trends in population, economics and the environment. It sold millions of copies and was translated into 28 languages.
- 1973 E. F. Schumacher published a collection of essays on shifting towards sustainable living through the appropriate use of technology in his book Small Is Beautiful.
- 1992–2002 The United Nations held a series of conferences, which focused on increasing sustainability within societies to conserve the Earth's natural resources. The Earth Summit conferences were held in 1992, 1972 and 2002.
- 2007 the United Nations published Sustainable Consumption and Production, Promoting Climate-Friendly Household Consumption Patterns, which promoted sustainable lifestyles in communities and homes.

== Shelter ==
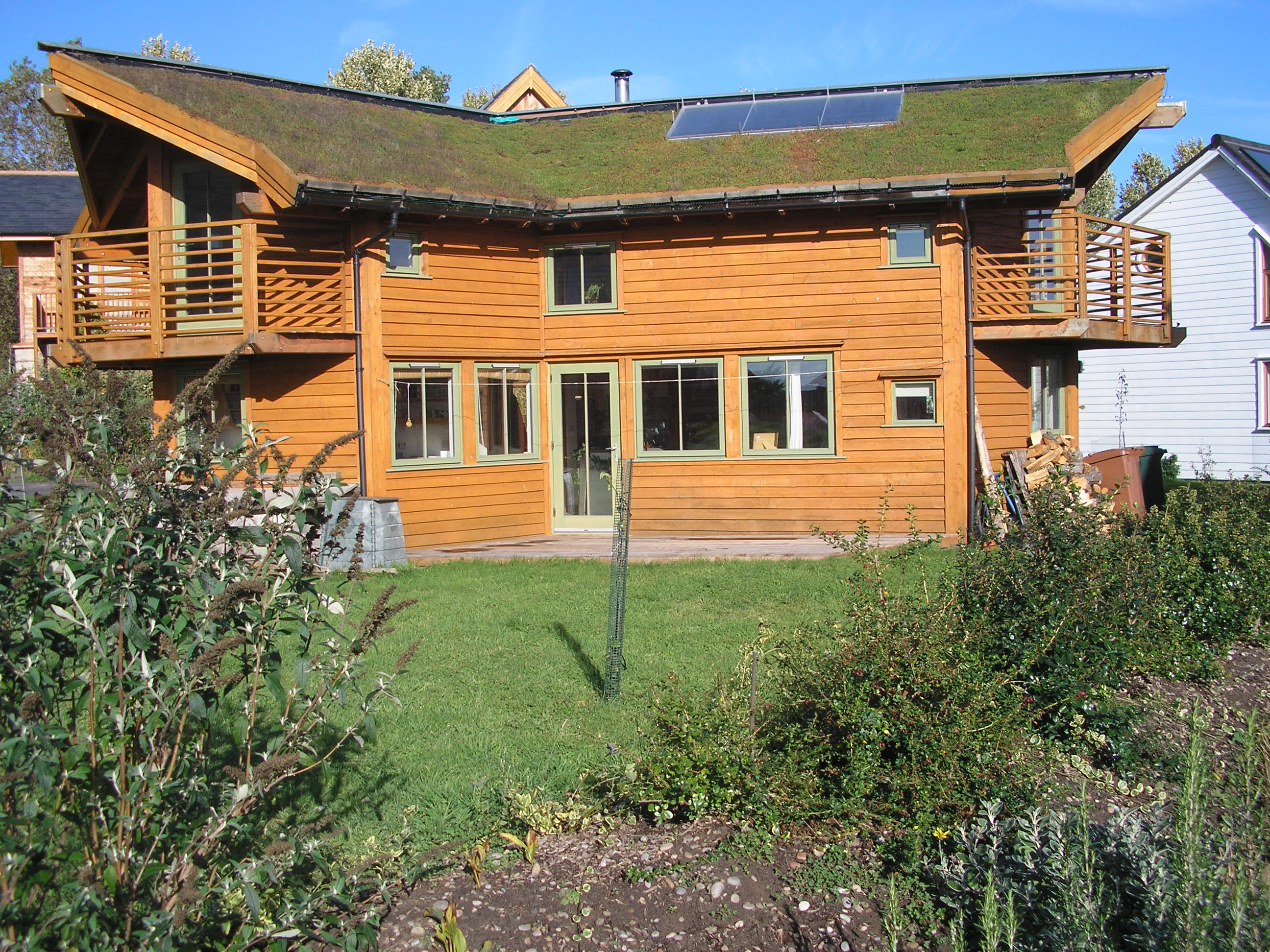
An example of ecological housing

On a global scale, shelter is associated with about 25% of the greenhouse gas emissions embodied in household purchases and 26% of households' land use.

Sustainable homes are built using sustainable methods and materials and facilitate green practices, enabling a more sustainable lifestyle. Their construction and maintenance have neutral impacts on the Earth. Often, if necessary, they are close in proximity to essential services such as grocery stores, schools, daycares, work, or public transit making it possible to commit to sustainable transportation choices. Sometimes, they are off-the-grid homes that do not require any public energy, water, or sewer service.

If not off-the-grid, sustainable homes may be linked to a grid supplied by a power plant that is using sustainable power sources, buying power as is normal convention. Additionally, sustainable homes may be connected to a grid, but generate their own electricity through renewable means and sell any excess to a utility. There are two common methods to approaching this option: net metering and double metering.

Net metering uses the common meter that is installed in most homes, running forward when power is used from the grid, and running backward when power is put into the grid (which allows them to "net" out their total energy use, putting excess energy into the grid when not needed, and using energy from the grid during peak hours, when you may not be able to produce enough immediately). Power companies can quickly purchase the power that is put back into the grid, as it is being produced. Double metering involves installing two meters: one measuring electricity consumed, the other measuring electricity created. Additionally, or in place of selling their renewable energy, sustainable homeowners may choose to bank their excess energy by using it to charge batteries. This gives them the option to use the power later during less favorable power-generating times (i.e., night-time, when there has been no wind, etc.), and to be completely independent of the electrical grid.

Sustainably designed (see Sustainable Design) houses are generally sited so as to create as little of a negative impact on the surrounding ecosystem as possible, oriented to the sun so that it creates the best possible microclimate (typically, the long axis of the house or building should be oriented east–west), and provide natural shading or wind barriers where and when needed, among many other considerations. The design of a sustainable shelter affords the options it has later (i.e.: using passive solar lighting and heating, creating temperature buffer zones by adding porches, deep overhangs to help create favorable microclimates, etc.) Sustainably constructed houses involve environmentally friendly management of waste building materials such as recycling and composting, use non-toxic and renewable, recycled, reclaimed, or low-impact production materials that have been created and treated in a sustainable fashion (such as using organic or water-based finishes), use as much locally available materials and tools as possible so as to reduce the need for transportation, and use low-impact production methods (methods that minimize effects on the environment).

In April 2019, New York City passed a bill to cut greenhouse gas emissions. The bill's goal was to minimize the climate pollution stemming from the hub that is New York City. It was approved in a 42-to-5 vote, showing a strong favor of the bill. The bill will restrict energy use in larger buildings. The bill imposes greenhouse gas caps on buildings that are over 25,000 square feet. The calculation of the exact cap is done by square feet per building. A similar emission cap had existed already for buildings of 50,000 square feet or more. This bill expands the legislation to cover more large buildings. The bill protects rent-regulated buildings of which there are around 990,000. Due to the implementation of the bill, around 23,000 new green jobs will be created. The bill received support from Mayor Bill de Blasio. New York is taking action based on the recognition that their climate pollution has effects far beyond the city limits of New York. In discussion of a possible new Amazon headquarters in NYC, De Blasio specified that the bill applies to everyone, regardless of prestige. Mayor de Blasio also announced a lawsuit by the city (of New York) against five major oil companies due to their harm to the environment and climate pollution. This also raises the question of the possible closing of the 24 oil and gas-burning power plants in New York City, due to the aimed-at declining use of these sources of energy. With the emission cap, New York will likely see a turn to renewable energy sources. It is possible that these plants will be transitioned to hubs of renewable energy to power the city. This new bill will go into action in three years (2022) and is estimated to cut climate pollution by 40% in eight years (by 2030).

Many materials can be considered a "green" material until their background is revealed. Any material that has used toxic or carcinogenic chemicals in its treatment or manufacturing (such as formaldehyde in glues used in woodworking), has traveled extensively from its source or manufacturer, or has been cultivated or harvested in an unsustainable manner might not be considered green. In order for any material to be considered green, it must be resource efficient, not compromise indoor air quality or water conservation, and be energy efficient (both in processing and when in use in the shelter). Resource efficiency can be achieved by using as much recycled content, reusable or recyclable content, materials that employ recycled or recyclable packaging, locally available material, salvaged or remanufactured material, material that employs resource efficient manufacturing, and long-lasting material as possible.

=== Sustainable building materials ===
Some building materials might be considered "sustainable" by some definitions and under certain conditions. For example, wood might be thought of as sustainable if it is grown using sustainable forest management, processed using sustainable energy, delivered by sustainable transport, etc. Under different conditions, however, it might not be considered sustainable. The following materials might be considered as sustainable under certain conditions, based on a Life-cycle assessment:

- Adobe
- Bamboo
- Cellulose insulation
- Clay
- Cob
- Composite wood (when made from reclaimed hardwood sawdust and reclaimed or recycled plastic)
- Compressed earth block
- Cordwood
- Cork
- Hemp
- Insulating concrete forms
- Lime render
- Linoleum
- Lumber from Forest Stewardship Council approved sources
- Natural rubber
- Natural fiber (coir, wool, jute, etc.)
- Organic cotton insulation
- Papercrete
- Rammed earth
- Reclaimed stone
- Reclaimed brick
- Recycled metal
- Recycled concrete
- Recycled paper
- Soy-based adhesive
- Soy insulation
- Straw bale
- Structural insulated panel
- Wood

Insulation of a sustainable home is important because of the energy it conserves throughout the life of the home. Well-insulated walls and lofts using green materials are a must as it reduces or, in combination with a house that is well designed, eliminates the need for heating and cooling altogether. Installation of insulation varies according to the type of insulation being used. Typically, lofts are insulated by strips of insulating material laid between rafters. Walls with cavities are done in much the same manner. For walls that do not have cavities behind them, solid-wall insulation may be necessary which can decrease internal space and can be expensive to install. Energy-efficient windows are another important factor in insulation. Simply assuring that windows (and doors) are well sealed greatly reduces energy loss in a home. Double or triple-glazed windows are the typical method of insulating windows, trapping gas or creating a vacuum between two or three panes of glass allowing heat to be trapped inside or out. Low-emissivity or Low-E glass is another option for window insulation. It is a coating on windowpanes of a thin, transparent layer of metal oxide and works by reflecting heat to its source, keeping the interior warm during the winter and cool during the summer. Simply hanging heavy-backed curtains in front of windows may also help their insulation. "Superwindows," mentioned in Natural Capitalism: Creating the Next Industrial Revolution, became available in the 1980s and use a combination of many available technologies, including two to three transparent low-e coatings, multiple panes of glass, and a heavy gas filling. Although more expensive, they are said to be able to insulate four and a half times better than a typical double-glazed window.

Equipping roofs with highly reflective material (such as aluminum) increases a roof's albedo and will help reduce the amount of heat it absorbs, hence the amount of energy needed to cool the building it is on. Green roofs or "living roofs" are a popular choice for thermally insulating a building. They are also popular for their ability to catch storm-water runoff and, when in the broader picture of a community, reduce the heat island effect (see urban heat island) thereby reducing energy costs of the entire area. Arguably, they are able to replace the physical "footprint" that the building creates, helping reduce the adverse environmental impacts of the building's presence.

Energy efficiency and water conservation are also major considerations in sustainable housing. If using appliances, computers, HVAC systems, electronics, or lighting the sustainable-minded often look for an Energy Star label, which is government-backed and holds stricter regulations in energy and water efficiency than is required by law. Ideally, a sustainable shelter should be able to completely run the appliances it uses using renewable energy and should strive to have a neutral impact on the Earth's water sources

Greywater, including water from washing machines, sinks, showers, and baths may be reused in landscape irrigation and toilets as a method of water conservation. Likewise, rainwater harvesting from stormwater runoff is also a sustainable method to conserve water use in a sustainable shelter. Sustainable Urban Drainage Systems replicate the natural systems that clean water in wildlife and implement them in a city's drainage system so as to minimize contaminated water and unnatural rates of runoff into the environment.

See related articles in: LEED (Leadership in Energy and Environmental Design) and also it is one of the most important factors of sustainable lifestyle.

== Power ==
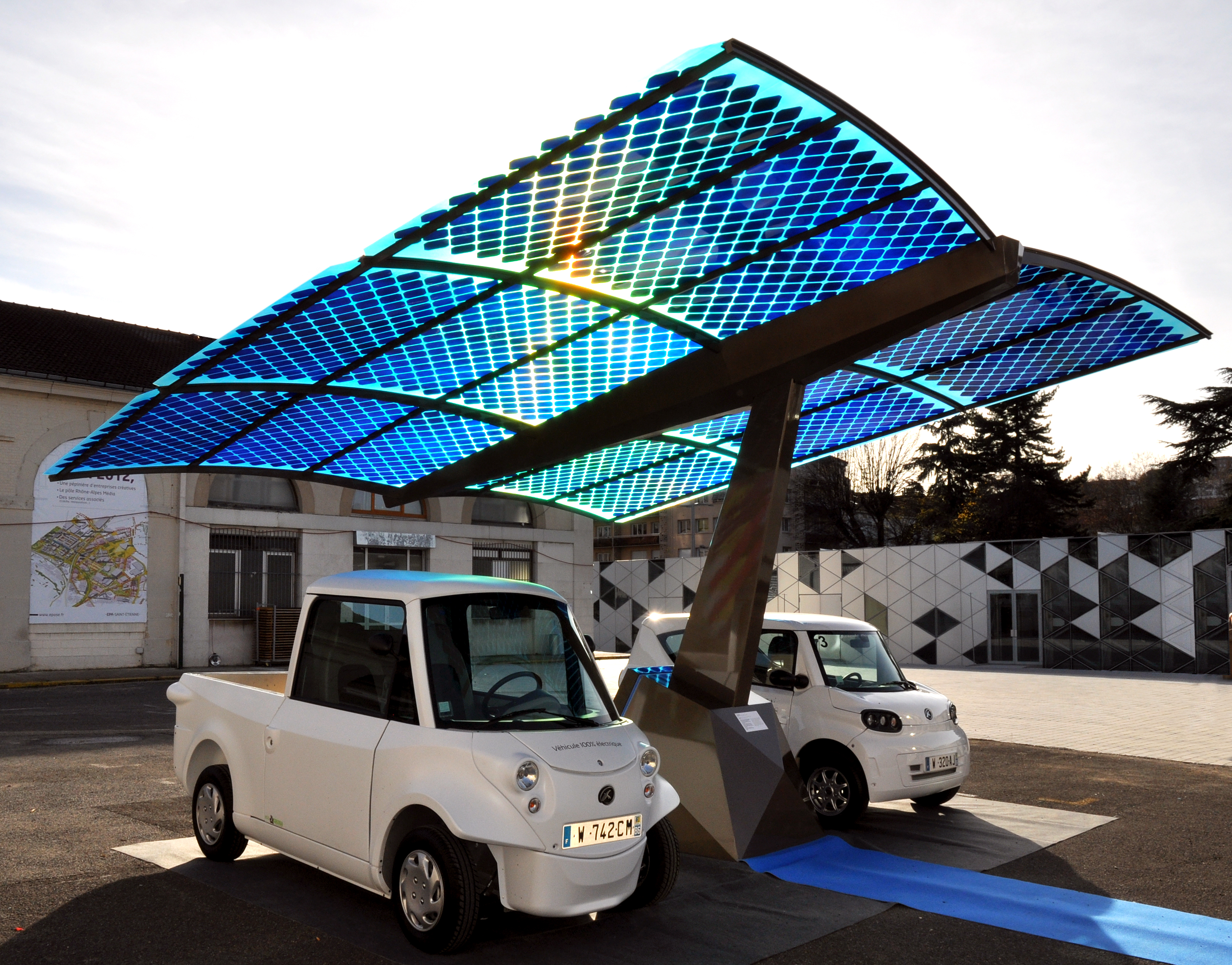
Sustainable urban design and innovation: Photovoltaic ombrière SUDI is an autonomous and mobile station that replenishes energy for electric vehicles using solar energy.

As mentioned under Shelter, some sustainable households may choose to produce their own renewable energy, while others may choose to purchase it through the grid from a power company that harnesses sustainable sources (also mentioned previously are the methods of metering the production and consumption of electricity in a household). Purchasing sustainable energy, however, may simply not be possible in some locations due to its limited availability. 6 out of the 50 states in the US do not offer green energy, for example. For those that do, its consumers typically buy a fixed amount or a percentage of their monthly consumption from a company of their choice and the bought green energy is fed into the entire national grid. Technically, in this case, the green energy is not being fed directly to the household that buys it. In this case, it is possible that the amount of green electricity that the buying household receives is a small fraction of their total incoming electricity. This may or may not depend on the amount being purchased. The purpose of buying green electricity is to support their utility's effort in producing sustainable energy. Producing sustainable energy on an individual household or community basis is much more flexible, but can still be limited in the richness of the sources that the location may afford (some locations may not be rich in renewable energy sources while others may have an abundance of it).

When generating renewable energy and feeding it back into the grid (in participating countries such as the US and Germany), producing households are typically paid at least the full standard electricity rate by their utility and are also given separate renewable energy credits that they can then sell to their utility, additionally (utilities are interested in buying these renewable energy credits because it allows them to claim that they produce renewable energy). In some special cases, producing households may be paid up to four times the standard electricity rate, but this is not common.

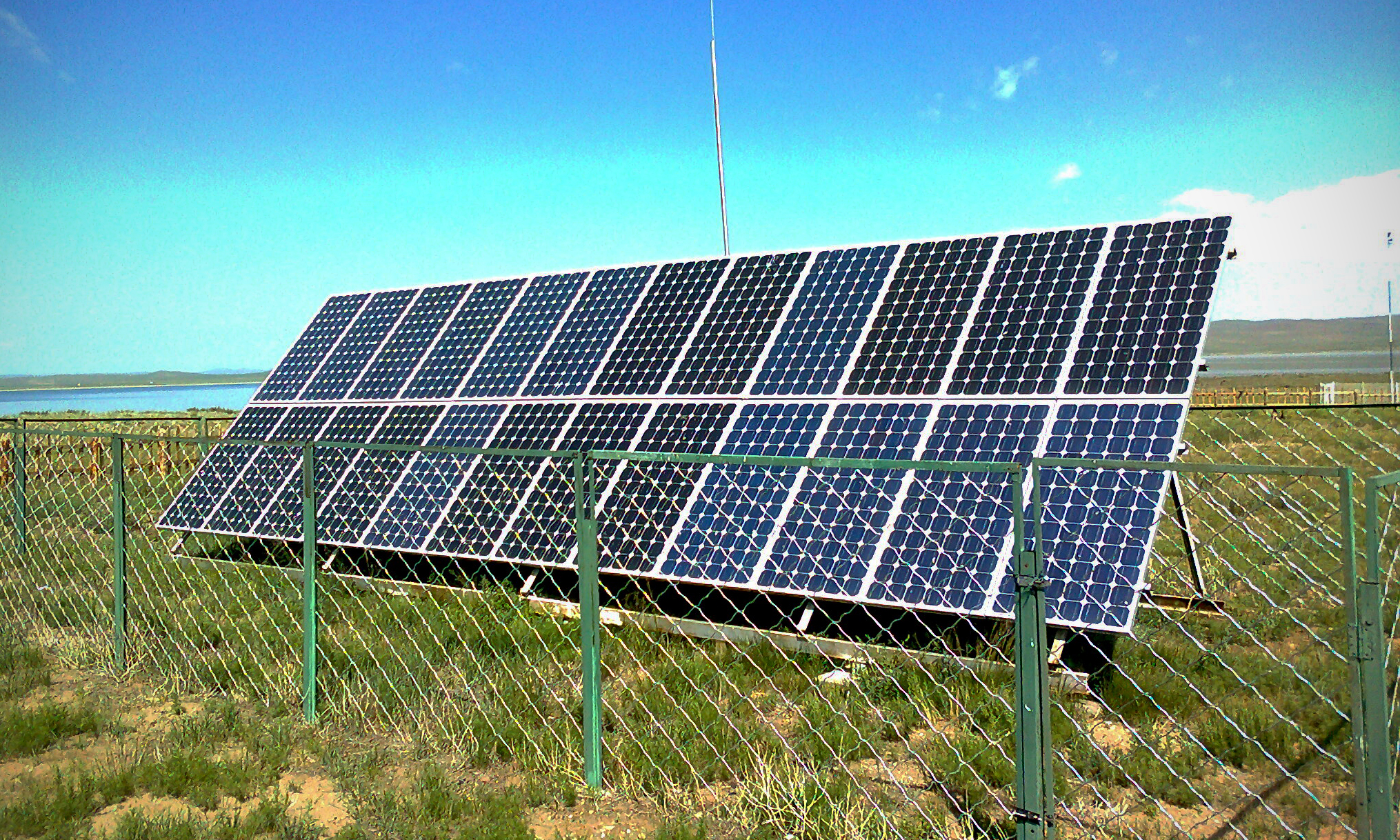
An installation of solar panels in rural Mongolia

Solar power harnesses the energy of the sun to make electricity. Two typical methods for converting solar energy into electricity are photo-voltaic cells that are organized into panels and concentrated solar power, which uses mirrors to concentrate sunlight to either heat a fluid that runs an electrical generator via a steam turbine or heat engine, or to simply cast onto photo-voltaic cells. The energy created by photo-voltaic cells is a direct current and has to be converted to alternating current before it can be used in a household. At this point, users can choose to either store this direct current in batteries for later use, or use an AC/DC inverter for immediate use. To get the best out of a solar panel, the angle of incidence of the sun should be between 20 and 50 degrees. Solar power via photovoltaic cells are usually the most expensive method of harnessing renewable energy, but is falling in price as technology advances and public interest increases. It has the advantages of being portable, easy to use on an individual basis, readily available for government grants and incentives, and being flexible regarding location (though it is most efficient when used in hot, arid areas since they tend to be the sunniest). For those that are lucky, affordable rental schemes may be found. Concentrated solar power plants are typically used on more of a community scale rather than an individual household scale, because of the amount of energy they can harness but can be done on an individual scale with a parabolic reflector.

Solar thermal energy is harnessed by collecting direct heat from the sun. One of the most common ways that this method is used by households is through solar water heating. In a broad perspective, these systems involve well-insulated tanks for storage and collectors that are either passive or active systems (active systems have pumps that continuously circulate water through the collectors and storage tank) and, in active systems, involve either directly heating the water that will be used or heating a non-freezing heat-transfer fluid that then heats the water that will be used. Passive systems are cheaper than active systems since they do not require a pumping system (instead, they take advantage of the natural movement of hot water rising above cold water to cycle the water being used through the collector and storage tank).

Other methods of harnessing solar power are solar space heating (for heating internal building spaces), solar drying (for drying wood chips, fruits, grains, etc.), solar cookers, solar distillers, and other passive solar technologies (simply, harnessing sunlight without any mechanical means).

Wind power is harnessed through turbines, set on tall towers (typically 20’ or 6m with 10‘ or 3m diameter blades for an individual household's needs) that power a generator that creates electricity. They typically require an average wind speed of 9 mi/hr (14 km/h) to be worth their investment (as prescribed by the US Department of Energy), and are capable of paying for themselves within their lifetimes. Wind turbines in urban areas usually need to be mounted at least 30’ (10m) in the air to receive enough wind and to be void of nearby obstructions (such as neighboring buildings). Mounting a wind turbine may also require permission from authorities. Wind turbines have been criticized for the noise they produce, their appearance, and the argument that they can affect the migratory patterns of birds (their blades obstruct passage in the sky). Wind turbines are much more feasible for those living in rural areas and are one of the most cost-effective forms of renewable energy per kilowatt, approaching the cost of fossil fuels, and have quick paybacks.

For those that have a body of water flowing at an adequate speed (or falling from an adequate height) on their property, hydroelectricity may be an option. On a large scale, hydroelectricity, in the form of dams, has adverse environmental and social impacts. When on a small scale, however, in the form of single turbines, hydroelectricity is very sustainable. Single water turbines or even a group of single turbines are not environmentally or socially disruptive. On an individual household basis, single turbines are probably the only economically feasible route (but can have high paybacks and is one of the most efficient methods of renewable energy production). It is more common for an eco-village to use this method rather than a singular household.

Geothermal energy production involves harnessing the hot water or steam below the earth's surface, in reservoirs, to produce energy. Because the hot water or steam that is used is reinjected back into the reservoir, this source is considered sustainable. However, those who plan on getting their electricity from this source should be aware that there is controversy over the lifespan of each geothermal reservoir as some believe that their lifespans are naturally limited (they cool down over time, making geothermal energy production there eventually impossible). This method is often large-scale, as the system required to harness geothermal energy can be complex and requires deep drilling equipment. There do exist small individual-scale geothermal operations, however, which harness reservoirs very close to the Earth's surface, avoiding the need for extensive drilling and sometimes even taking advantage of lakes or ponds where there is already a depression. In this case, the heat is captured and sent to a geothermal heat pump system located inside the shelter or facility that needs it (often, this heat is used directly to warm a greenhouse during the colder months). Although geothermal energy is available everywhere on Earth, practicality and cost-effectiveness vary, directly related to the depth required to reach reservoirs. Places such as the Philippines, Hawaii, Alaska, Iceland, California, and Nevada have geothermal reservoirs closer to the Earth's surface, making its production cost-effective.

Biomass power is created when any biological matter is burned as fuel. As with the case of using green materials in a household, it is best to use as much locally available material as possible so as to reduce the carbon footprint created by transportation. Although burning biomass for fuel releases carbon dioxide, sulfur compounds, and nitrogen compounds into the atmosphere, a major concern in a sustainable lifestyle, the amount that is released is sustainable (it will not contribute to a rise in carbon dioxide levels in the atmosphere). This is because the biological matter that is being burned releases the same amount of carbon dioxide that it consumed during its lifetime. However, burning biodiesel and bioethanol (see biofuel) when created from virgin material, is increasingly controversial and may or may not be considered sustainable because it inadvertently increases global poverty, the clearing of more land for new agriculture fields (the source of the biofuel is also the same source of food), and may use unsustainable growing methods (such as the use of environmentally harmful pesticides and fertilizers).

=== List of organic matter that can be burned for fuel ===
- Bagasse
- Biogas
- Manure
- Stover
- Straw
- Used vegetable oil
- Wood

Digestion of organic material to produce methane is becoming an increasingly popular method of biomass energy production. Materials such as waste sludge can be digested to release methane gas that can then be burnt to produce electricity. Methane gas is also a natural by-product of landfills, full of decomposing waste, and can be harnessed here to produce electricity as well. The advantage in burning methane gas is that it prevents the methane from being released into the atmosphere, exacerbating the greenhouse effect. Although this method of biomass energy production is typically large scale (done in landfills), it can be done on a smaller individual or community scale as well.

== Food ==
Globally, food accounts for 48% and 90% of household environmental impacts on land and water resources respectively, with consumption of meat, dairy and processed food rising quickly with income.

=== Environmental impacts of industrial agriculture ===
Industrial agricultural production is highly resource and energy intensive. Industrial agriculture systems typically require heavy irrigation, extensive pesticide and fertilizer application, intensive tillage, concentrated monoculture production, and other continual inputs. As a result of these industrial farming conditions, today's mounting environmental stresses are further exacerbated. These stresses include: declining water tables, chemical leaching, chemical runoff, soil erosion, land degradation, loss in biodiversity, and other ecological concerns.

=== Conventional food distribution and long-distance transport ===
Conventional food distribution and long-distance transport are additionally resource and energy exhaustive. Substantial climate-disrupting carbon emissions, boosted by the transport of food over long distances, are of growing concern as the world faces such global crisis as natural resource depletion, peak oil and climate change. "The average American meal currently costs about 1500 miles, and takes about 10 calories of oil and other fossil fuels to produce a single calorie of food."

=== Local and seasonal foods ===
A more sustainable means of acquiring food is to purchase locally and seasonally. Buying food from local farmers reduces carbon output, caused by long-distance food transport, and stimulates the local economy. Local, small-scale farming operations also typically utilize more sustainable methods of agriculture than conventional industrial farming systems such as decreased tillage, nutrient cycling, fostered biodiversity and reduced chemical pesticide and fertilizer applications. Adapting a more regional, seasonally based diet is more sustainable as it entails purchasing less energy and resource-demanding produce that naturally grow within a local area and require no long-distance transport. These vegetables and fruits are also grown and harvested within their suitable growing season. Thus, seasonal food farming does not require energy-intensive greenhouse production, extensive irrigation, plastic packaging and long-distance transport from importing non-regional foods, and other environmental stressors. Local, seasonal produce is typically fresher, unprocessed and argued to be more nutritious. Local produce also contains less to no chemical residues from applications required for long-distance shipping and handling. Farmers' markets, public events where local small-scale farmers gather and sell their produce, are a good source for obtaining local food and knowledge about local farming productions. As well as promoting localization of food, farmers' markets are a central gathering place for community interaction. Another way to become involved in regional food distribution is by joining a local community-supported agriculture (CSA). A CSA consists of a community of growers and consumers who pledge to support a farming operation while equally sharing the risks and benefits of food production. CSA's usually involve a system of weekly pick-ups of locally farmed vegetables and fruits, sometimes including dairy products, meat and special food items such as baked goods. Considering the previously noted rising environmental crisis, the United States and much of the world is facing immense vulnerability to famine. Local food production ensures food security if potential transportation disruptions and climatic, economic, and sociopolitical disasters were to occur.

=== Reducing meat consumption ===
Industrial meat production also involves high environmental costs such as land degradation, soil erosion and depletion of natural resources, especially pertaining to water and food. Mass meat production increase the amount of methane in the atmosphere. For more information on the environmental impact of meat production and consumption, see the ethics of eating meat. Reducing meat consumption, perhaps to a few meals a week, or adopting a vegetarian or vegan diet, alleviates the demand for environmentally damaging industrial meat production. Buying and consuming organically raised, free range or grass fed meat is another alternative towards more sustainable meat consumption.

=== Organic farming ===
Purchasing and supporting organic products is another fundamental contribution to sustainable living. Organic farming is a rapidly emerging trend in the food industry and in the web of sustainability. According to the USDA National Organic Standards Board (NOSB), organic agriculture is defined as "an ecological production management system that promotes and enhances biodiversity, biological cycles, and soil biological activity. It is based on minimal use of off-farm inputs and on management practices that restore, maintain, or enhance ecological harmony. The primary goal of organic agriculture is to optimize the health and productivity of interdependent communities of soil life, plants, animals and people." Upon sustaining these goals, organic agriculture uses techniques such as crop rotation, permaculture, compost, green manure and biological pest control. In addition, organic farming prohibits or strictly limits the use of manufactured fertilizers and pesticides, plant growth regulators such as hormones, livestock antibiotics, food additives and genetically modified organisms. Organically farmed products include vegetables, fruit, grains, herbs, meat, dairy, eggs, fibers, and flowers. See organic certification for more information.

=== Urban gardening ===
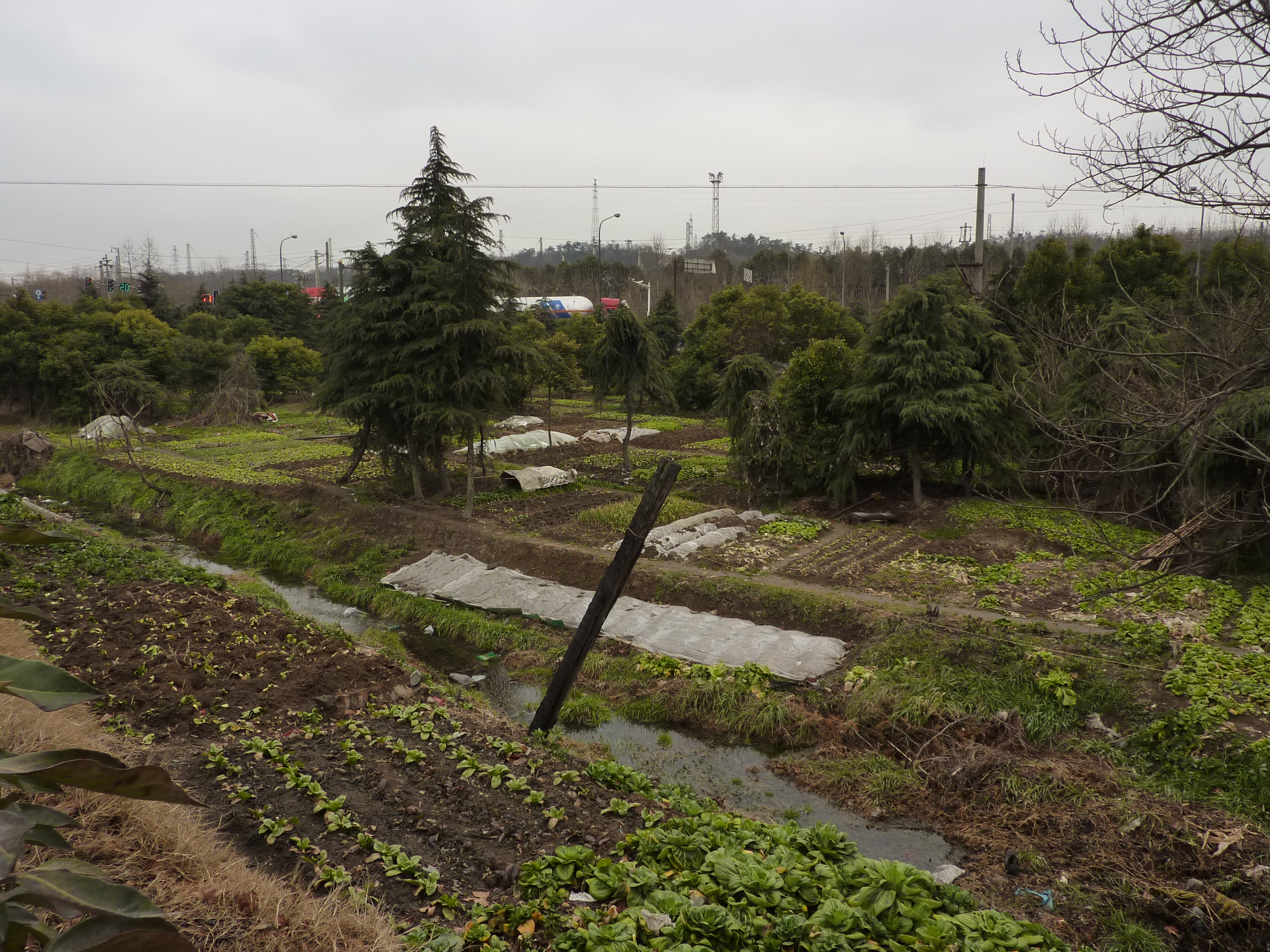
"Edible landscaping": a vegetable garden incorporated by the residents into a roadside park. Qixia District, Nanjing, China

In addition to local, small-scale farms, there has been a recent emergence in urban agriculture expanding from community gardens to private home gardens. With this trend, both farmers and ordinary people are becoming involved in food production. A network of urban farming systems helps to further ensure regional food security and encourages self-sufficiency and cooperative interdependence within communities. With every bite of food raised from urban gardens, negative environmental impacts are reduced in numerous ways. For instance, vegetables and fruits raised within small-scale gardens and farms are not grown with tremendous applications of nitrogen fertilizer required for industrial agricultural operations. The nitrogen fertilizers cause toxic chemical leaching and runoff that enters our water tables. Nitrogen fertilizer also produces nitrous oxide, a more damaging greenhouse gas than carbon dioxide. Local, community-grown food also requires no imported, long-distance transport which further depletes our fossil fuel reserves. In developing more efficiency per land acre, urban gardens can be started in a wide variety of areas: in vacant lots, public parks, private yards, church and school yards, on rooftops (roof-top gardens), and many other places. Communities can work together in changing zoning limitations in order for public and private gardens to be permissible. Aesthetically pleasing edible landscaping plants can also be incorporated into city landscaping such as blueberry bushes, grapevines trained on an arbor, pecan trees, etc. With as small a scale as home or community farming, sustainable and organic farming methods can easily be utilized. Such sustainable, organic farming techniques include: composting, biological pest control, crop rotation, mulching, drip irrigation, nutrient cycling and permaculture. For more information on sustainable farming systems, see sustainable agriculture.

=== Food preservation and storage ===
Preserving and storing foods reduces reliance on long-distance transported food and the market industry. Home-grown foods can be preserved and stored outside of their growing season and continually consumed throughout the year, enhancing self-sufficiency and independence from the supermarket. Food can be preserved and saved by dehydration, freezing, vacuum packing, canning, bottling, pickling and jellying. For more information, see food preservation.

== Transportation ==
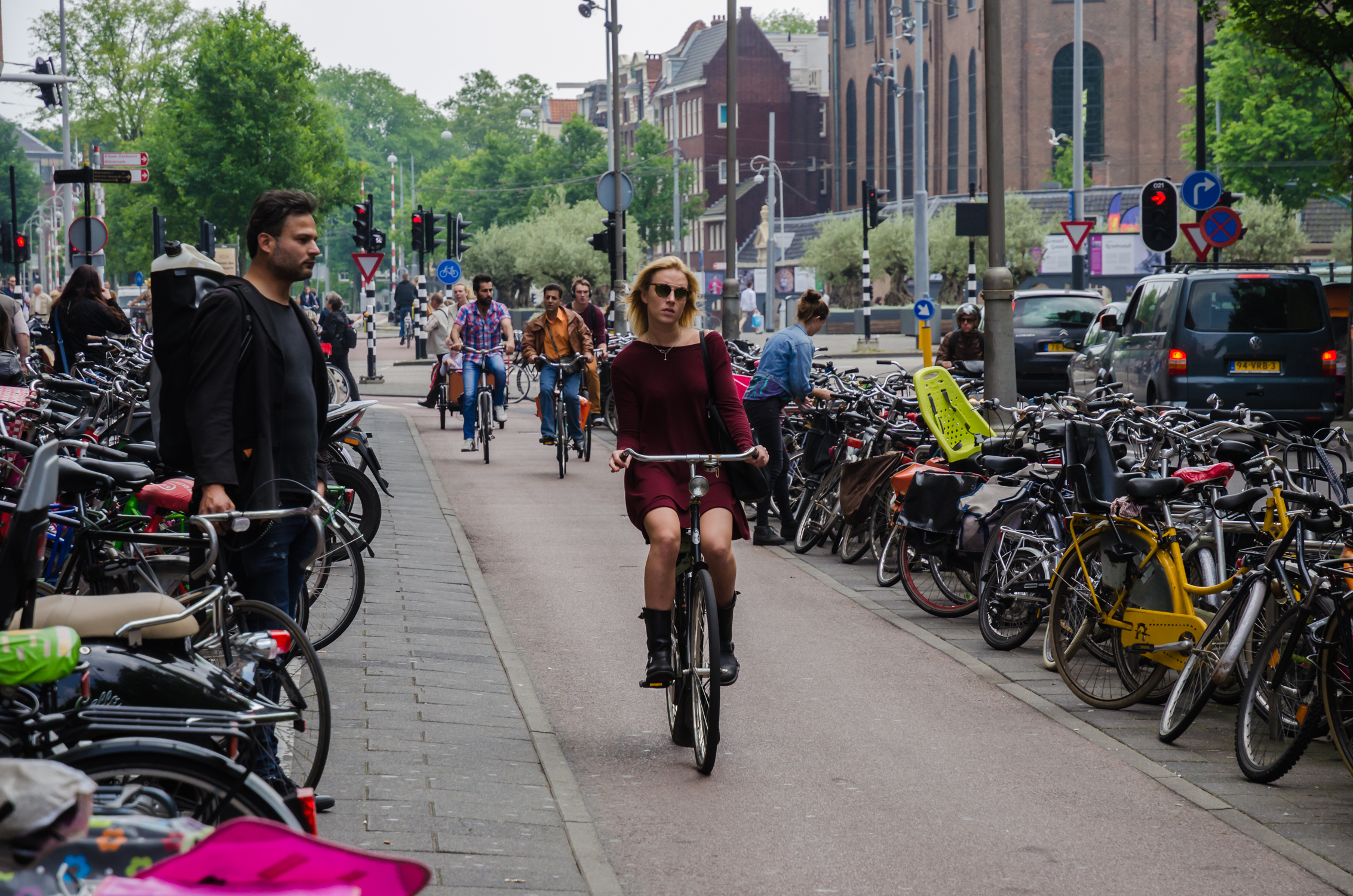
Cycling on an upright bicycle along the Fietspad in Amsterdam, safe from traffic.

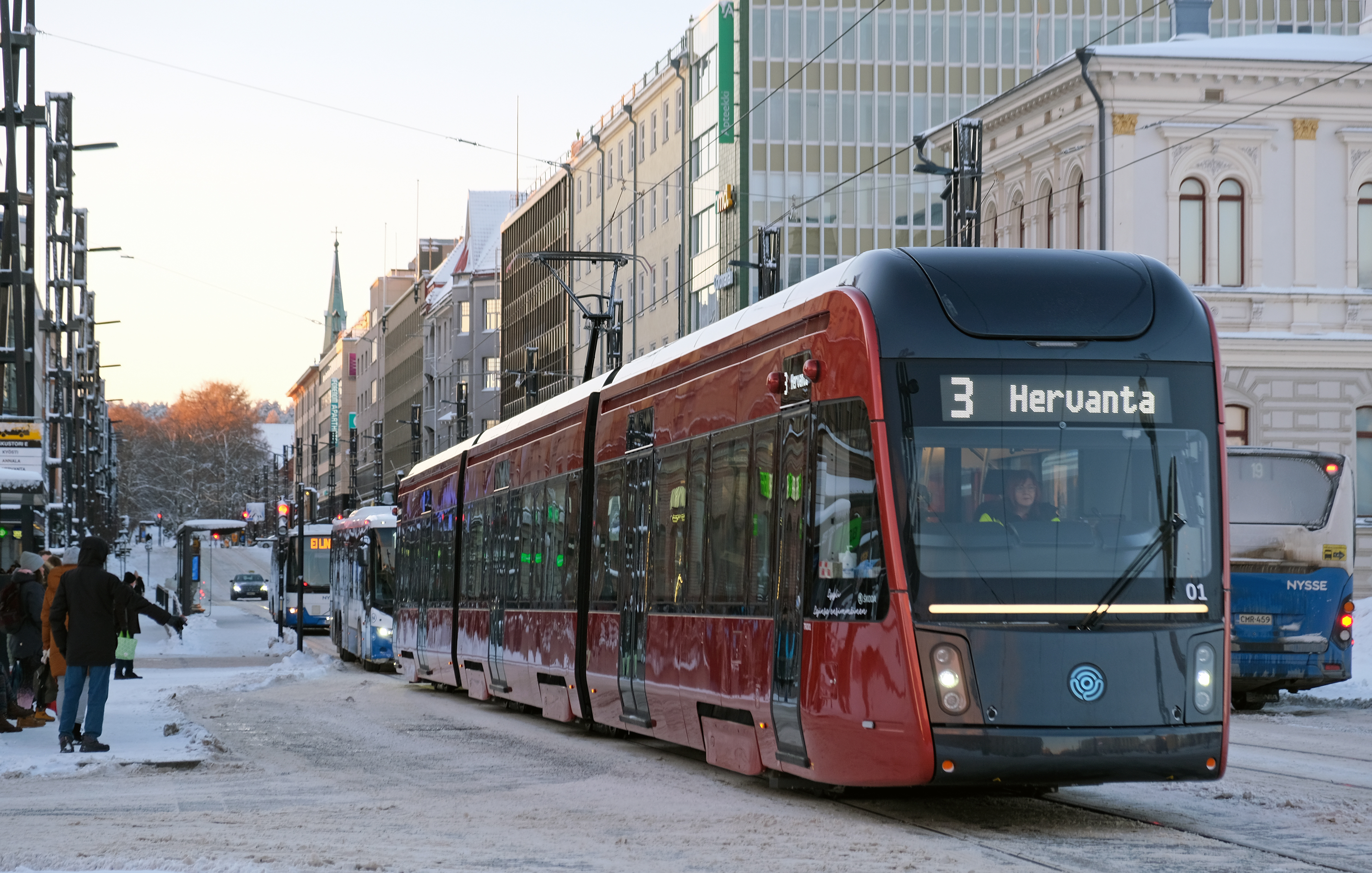
The Artic X34 tram vehicle along the Hämeenkatu street in Tampere, Finland where nuclear is the main power source for electricity

With rising concerns over non-renewable energy source usage and climate change caused by carbon emissions, the phase-out of fossil fuel vehicles is becoming more and more important to the conversation of sustainability. Zero-emission urban transport systems that foster mobility, accessible public transportation and healthier urban environments are needed. Such urban transport systems should consist of rail transport, electric buses, bicycle pathways, provision for human-powered transport and pedestrian walkways. Public transport systems such as underground rail systems and bus transit systems shift huge numbers of people away from reliance on car dependency and dramatically reduce the rate of carbon emissions caused by automobile transport.

In comparison to automobiles, bicycles are a paragon of energy-efficient personal transportation with the bicycle roughly 50 times more energy efficient than driving. Bicycles increase mobility while alleviating congestion, lowering air and noise pollution, and increasing physical exercise. Most importantly, they do not emit climate-damaging carbon dioxide. Bike-sharing programs are beginning to boom throughout the world and are modeled in leading cities such as Paris, Amsterdam and London. Bike-sharing programs offer kiosks and docking stations that supply hundreds to thousands of bikes for rental throughout a city through small deposits or affordable memberships.

A recent boom has occurred in electric bikes especially in China and other Asian countries. Electric bikes are similar to electric cars in that they are battery-powered and can be plugged into the provincial electric grid for recharging as needed. In contrast to electric cars, electric bikes do not directly use any fossil fuels. Adequate sustainable urban transportation is dependent upon proper city transport infrastructure and planning that incorporates efficient public transit along with bicycle and pedestrian-friendly pathways.

== Water ==
A major factor of sustainable living involves that which no human can live without, water. Unsustainable water use has far-reaching implications for humankind. Currently, humans use one-fourth of the Earth's total fresh water in natural circulation, and over half the accessible runoff. Additionally, population growth and water demand is ever increasing. Thus, it is necessary to use available water more efficiently. In sustainable living, one can use water more sustainably through a series of simple, everyday measures. These measures involve considering indoor home appliance efficiency, outdoor water use, and daily water use awareness.

=== Indoor home appliances ===
Housing and commercial buildings account for 12 percent of America's freshwater withdrawals. A typical American single family home uses about 70 US gallons (260 L) per person per day indoors. This use can be reduced by simple alterations in behavior and upgrades to appliance quality.

==== Toilets ====
Toilets accounted for almost 30% of residential indoor water use in the United States in 1999. One flush of a standard U.S. toilet requires more water than most individuals, and many families, in the world use for all their needs in an entire day. A home's toilet water sustainability can be improved in one of two ways: improving the current toilet or installing a more efficient toilet. To improve the current toilet, one possible method is to put weighted plastic bottles in the toilet tank. Also, there are inexpensive tank banks or float booster available for purchase. A tank bank is a plastic bag to be filled with water and hung in the toilet tank. A float booster attaches underneath the float ball of pre-1986 three and a half gallon capacity toilets. It allows these toilets to operate at the same valve and float setting but significantly reduces their water level, saving between one and one and a third gallons of water per flush. A major waste of water in existing toilets is leaks. A slow toilet leak is undetectable to the eye, but can waste hundreds of gallons each month. One way to check this is to put food dye in the tank and to see if the water in the toilet bowl turns the same color. In the event of a leaky flapper, one can replace it with an adjustable toilet flapper, which allows self-adjustment of the amount of water per flush.

In installing a new toilet there are a number of options to obtain the most water-efficient model. A low flush toilet uses one to two gallons per flush. Traditionally, toilets use three to five gallons per flush. If an eighteen-liter per flush toilet is removed and a six-liter per flush toilet is put in its place, 70% of the water flushed will be saved while the overall indoor water use by will be reduced by 30%. It is possible to have a toilet that uses no water. A composting toilet treats human waste through composting and dehydration, producing a valuable soil additive. These toilets feature a two-compartment bowl to separate urine from feces. The urine can be collected or sold as fertilizer. The feces can be dried and bagged or composted. These toilets cost scarcely more than regularly installed toilets and do not require a sewer hookup. In addition to providing valuable fertilizer, these toilets are highly sustainable because they save sewage collection and treatment, as well as lessen agricultural costs and improve topsoil.

Additionally, one can reduce toilet water sustainability by limiting total toilet flushing. For instance, instead of flushing small wastes, such as tissues, one can dispose of these items in the trash or compost.

==== Showers ====
On average, showers were 18% of U.S. indoor water use in 1999, at 6–8 US gallons (23–30 L) per minute traditionally in America. A simple method to reduce this use is to switch to low-flow, high-performance showerheads. These showerheads use only 1.0–1.5 gpm or less. An alternative to replacing the showerhead is to install a converter. This device arrests a running shower upon reaching the desired temperature. Solar water heaters can be used to obtain optimal water temperature and are more sustainable because they reduce dependence on fossil fuels. To lessen excess water use, water pipes can be insulated with pre-slit foam pipe insulation. This insulation decreases hot water generation time. A simple, straightforward method to conserve water when showering is to take shorter showers. One method to accomplish this is to turn off the water when it is not necessary (such as while lathering) and resume the shower when water is necessary. This can be facilitated when the plumbing or showerhead allows turning off the water without disrupting the desired temperature setting (common in the UK but not the United States).

==== Dishwashers and sinks ====
On average, sinks were 15% of U.S. indoor water use in 1999. There are, however, easy methods to rectify excessive water loss. Available for purchase is a screw-on aerator. This device works by combining water with air thus generating a frothy substance with greater perceived volume, reducing water use by half. Additionally, there is a flip-valve available that allows flow to be turned off and back on at the previously reached temperature. Finally, a laminar flow device creates a 1.5–2.4 gpm stream of water that reduces water use by half, but can be turned to normal water level when optimal.

In addition to buying the above devices, one can live more sustainably by checking sinks for leaks and fixing these leaks if they exist. According to the EPA, "A small drip from a worn faucet washer can waste 20 gallons of water per day, while larger leaks can waste hundreds of gallons". When washing dishes by hand, it is not necessary to leave the water running for rinsing, and it is more efficient to rinse dishes simultaneously.

On average, dishwashing consumes 1% of indoor water use. When using a dishwasher, water can be conserved by only running the machine when it is full. Some have a "low flow" setting to use less water per wash cycle. Enzymatic detergents clean dishes more efficiently and more successfully with a smaller amount of water at a lower temperature.

==== Washing machines ====
On average, 23% of U.S. indoor water use in 1999 was due to clothes washing. In contrast to other machines, American washing machines have changed little to become more sustainable. A typical washing machine has a vertical-axis design, in which clothes are agitated in a tubful of water. Horizontal-axis machines, in contrast, put less water into the bottom of the tub and rotate clothes through it. These machines are more efficient in terms of soap use and clothing stability.

=== Outdoor water use ===
There are a number of ways one can incorporate a personal yard, roof, and garden in more sustainable living. While conserving water is a major element of sustainability, so is sequestering water.

==== Conserving water ====
In planning a yard and garden space, it is most sustainable to consider the plants, soil, and available water. Drought-resistant shrubs, plants, and grasses require a smaller amount of water in comparison to more traditional species. Additionally, native plants (as opposed to herbaceous perennials) will use a smaller supply of water and have a heightened resistance to plant diseases of the area. Xeriscaping is a technique that selects drought-tolerant plants and accounts for endemic features such as slope, soil type, and native plant range. It can reduce landscape water use by 50 – 70%, while providing habitat space for wildlife. Plants on slopes help reduce runoff by slowing and absorbing accumulated rainfall. Grouping plants by watering needs further reduces water waste.

After planting, placing a circumference of mulch surrounding plants functions to lessen evaporation. To do this, firmly press two to four inches of organic matter along the plant's dripline. This prevents water runoff. When watering, consider the range of sprinklers; watering paved areas is unnecessary. Additionally, to conserve the maximum amount of water, watering should be carried out during early mornings on non-windy days to reduce water loss to evaporation. Drip-irrigation systems and soaker hoses are a more sustainable alternative to the traditional sprinkler system. Drip-irrigation systems employ small gaps at standard distances in a hose, leading to the slow trickle of water droplets that percolate the soil over a protracted period. These systems use 30 – 50% less water than conventional methods. Soaker hoses help to reduce water use by up to 90%. They connect to a garden hose and lay along the row of plants under a layer of mulch. A layer of organic material added to the soil helps to increase its absorption and water retention; previously planted areas can be covered with compost.

In caring for a lawn, there are a number of measures that can increase the sustainability of lawn maintenance techniques. A primary aspect of lawn care is watering. To conserve water, it is important to only water when necessary, and to deep soak when watering. Additionally, a lawn may be left to go dormant, renewing after a dry spell to its original vitality.

==== Sequestering water ====
A common method of water sequestration is rainwater harvesting, which incorporates the collection and storage of rain. Primarily, the rain is obtained from a roof and stored on the ground in catchment tanks. Water sequestration varies based on extent, cost, and complexity. A simple method involves a single barrel at the bottom of a downspout, while a more complex method involves multiple tanks. It is highly sustainable to use stored water in place of purified water for activities such as irrigation and flushing toilets. Additionally, using stored rainwater reduces the amount of runoff pollution, picked up from roofs and pavements that would normally enter streams through storm drains. The following equation can be used to estimate annual water supply:

Collection area (square feet) × Rainfall (inch/year) / 12 (inch/foot) = Cubic Feet of Water/Year

Cubic Feet/Year × 7.43 (Gallons/Cubic Foot) = Gallons/year

Note, however, this calculation does not account for losses such as evaporation or leakage.

Greywater systems function in sequestering used indoor water, such as laundry, bath and sink water, and filtering it for reuse. Greywater can be reused in irrigation and toilet flushing. There are two types of greywater systems: gravity-fed manual systems and package systems. The manual systems do not require electricity but may require a larger yard space. The package systems require electricity but are self-contained and can be installed indoors.

== Waste ==
As populations and resource demands climb, waste production contributes to emissions of carbon dioxide, leaching of hazardous materials into the soil and waterways, and methane emissions. In America alone, over the course of a decade, 500 trillion pounds (230 Gt) of American resources will have been transformed into nonproductive wastes and gases. Thus, a crucial component of sustainable living is being waste conscious. One can do this by reducing waste, reusing commodities, and recycling.

There are a number of ways to reduce waste in sustainable living. Two methods to reduce paper waste are canceling junk mail like credit card and insurance offers and direct mail marketing and changing monthly paper statements to paperless emails. Junk mail alone accounted for 1.72 million tons of landfill waste in 2009. Another method to reduce waste is to buy in bulk, reducing packaging materials. Preventing food waste can limit the amount of organic waste sent to landfills producing the powerful greenhouse gas methane. Another example of waste reduction involves being cognizant of purchasing excessive amounts when buying materials with limited use like cans of paint. Non-hazardous or less hazardous alternatives can also limit the toxicity of waste.

By reusing materials, one lives more sustainably by not contributing to the addition of waste to landfills. Reusing saves natural resources by decreasing the necessity of raw material extraction. For example, reusable bags can reduce the amount of waste created by grocery shopping eliminating the need to create and ship plastic bags and the need to manage their disposal and recycling or polluting effects.

One of the biggest contributors to waste is the use of plastic. The debris accumulates within the environment, not only harming humans' well-being, but also the health of many different species all over the world. Most plastics do not break down naturally, causing them to sit in habitats for centuries. Plastic waste has been increasing because of three reasons: plastic is more sturdy and long-lasting than most other materials, the growth in the world’s population, and convenience. Talks about how to improve the situation have been going on for years now. The most well-known method is the use of more sustainable materials and the act of recycling.

Recycling, a process that breaks down used items into raw materials to make new materials, is a particularly useful means of contributing to the renewal of goods. Recycling incorporates three primary processes: collection and processing, manufacturing, and purchasing recycled products. A natural example of recycling involves using food waste as compost to enrich the quality of soil, which can be carried out at home or locally with community composting. An offshoot of recycling, upcycling, strives to convert material into something of similar or greater value in its second life. By integrating measures of reusing, reducing, and recycling one can effectively reduce personal waste and use materials more sustainably.

== Reproductive choices ==
Though it is not always included in discussions of sustainable living, some consider reproductive choices to be a key part of sustainable living. Reproductive choices refer, in this case, to the number of children that an individual has, whether they are conceived biologically or adopted. Some researchers have claimed that for people living in wealthy, high-consumption countries such as the United States, having fewer children is by far the most effective way to decrease one's carbon footprint, and one's ecological footprint more broadly. However, the scholarship that has led to this claim has been questioned, as has the misleading way that it's often been presented in popular newspaper and web articles. Some ethicists and environmental activists have made similar arguments about the need for a "small family ethic" and research has found that in some countries, these ecological concerns are leading some people to report having fewer children than they would otherwise, or no children at all.

However, there have been multiple critiques of the idea that having fewer children is part of a sustainable lifestyle. Some argue that it is an example of the kind of Malthusian thinking that has led to coercion and violence in the past (including forced sterilizations and forced abortions), and that it might lead to similar policies that deny women reproductive freedom in the future. Additionally, research has found that some environmentalists consider having children, and even having more children than they might otherwise, to be a part of sustainable living. They assert that parenting can be an important way that individuals can exert a positive environmental influence by educating the next generation and as a way to remain engaged in one's commitment to environmental action.

== Provision, supply and expenditure in general ==
A study that reviewed 217 analyses of on-the-market products and services and analyzed existing alternatives to mainstream food, holidays, and furnishings, concluded that total greenhouse gas emissions by Swedes could be lowered by as of 2021 up to 36–38 % if consumers – without a decrease in total estimated expenditure or considerations of self-interest rationale – instead were to obtain those they – using available data – could assess to be more sustainable. Provision, supply/availability, product development/success/price, comparative benefits as well as incentives, purposes/demands and effects of expenditure-choices are part of or embedded in the human neuro-socioeconomic system and therefore overall largely beyond the control of an individual seeking to make rational and ethical choices within it even if all relevant life-cycle assessment/product and manufacturing information was available to this consumer.

== See also ==
- Buddhist economics
- Circles of Sustainability
- Citizen Science, cleanup projects that people can take part in.
- Cradle-to-cradle design
- Circular economy
- Climate-friendly gardening
- Downshifting
- Eco-communalism
- Ecodesign
- Ecological economics
- Ethical consumerism
- Foodscaping
- Frugality
- Simple living
- Sufficiency economy
- Sustainability
- Sustainable architecture
- Sustainable design
- Sustainable development
- Sustainable event management
- Sustainable landscaping
- Sustainable House Day (in Australia)
- Permaculture
- The Venus Project
- Transition Towns
- Role of Education
