= Deep Green Resistance =

Radical environmental movement

- Founded: 2011
- Founder: Derrick Jensen; Lierre Keith; Aric McBay
- Location: United States
- Method: Direct action; education
- Website: deepgreenresistance.org

Deep Green Resistance (DGR) is an American radical environmental movement that perceives the existence of industrial civilization itself as the greatest threat to the natural environment and calls for its dismantlement and a return to a pre-agricultural level of technology. Although DGR operates as an aboveground group, it calls on others to use underground and violent tactics such as attacks on infrastructure or assassination. A repeated claim in DGR literature is that acts of sabotage could cause a cascading effect and lead to the end of civilization. DGR and far-right ecofascists use similar accelerationist and anti-majoritarian tactics, seeking systemic collapse.

DGR is widely denounced by other radical environmentalists, even those who support sabotage, because of "the group's vanguardism, its disregard for billions of already-precarious human lives dependent on agriculture, its self-defeating attacks on anarchism and veganism, and the virulent transphobia of the group's leaders, Lierre Keith and Derrick Jensen". Some Native American and other environmental groups have refused to work with DGR because of its controversial stance on transgender issues.

== Beliefs ==
In the 2011 book Deep Green Resistance, the authors Lierre Keith, Derrick Jensen and Aric McBay state that civilization, particularly industrial civilization, is fundamentally unsustainable and must be actively and urgently dismantled in order to secure a future for all species on the planet.

DGR calls for the dismantling of industrial civilization, and the return to a pre-agricultural lifestyle.

== Tactics ==
DGR operates as an aboveground movement and requires members to take a nonviolence pledge as of 2019, calling on others to use underground and violent tactics such as attacks on infrastructure or assassination. DGR is one of very few environmental groups to endorse lethal violence as sometimes justified. A repeated claim in DGR literature is that acts of sabotage could cause a cascading effect and lead to the end of civilization. Because the organization advocates sabotage and violence, which it views as necessary tactics to achieve its goal of dismantling industrialized society and capitalism, it can be classified as an apocalyptic or millenarian movement. DGR and far-right ecofascist groups such as The Green Brigade share similar tactics and an anti-majoritarian and vanguardist approach to activism, and both are accelerationist, seeking systemic collapse.

In 2017, DGR filed a lawsuit against the state of Colorado arguing that the Colorado River should be recognized as a legal person. The lawsuit was dismissed in 2019.

An article in Journal of Strategic Security describes the group as a "worrying bioterrorism threat", citing its strategy and propensity towards violence. Beginning in 2014, the FBI investigated Deep Green Resistance.

== Criticism ==
Anarcho-primitivists John Zerzan, Kevin Tucker and others criticize DGR's promotion of hierarchy in organizing an underground resistance, the code of conduct, the historical understanding of revolution and radical history, and the cult of personality around Jensen and Keith. Michelle Renée Matisons and Alexander Reid Ross of the Institute for Anarchist Studies have accused DGR of "emulating right-wing militia rhetoric, with the accompanying hierarchical vanguardism, personality cultism, and reactionary moralism."

How to Blow Up a Pipeline author Andreas Malm—who argues that some forms of infrastructural sabotage are justified to advance the environmental movement—condemned DGR, arguing its proposals, if implemented, would spell disaster for the vast majority of people in the world.

=== Anti-trans views ===
DGR describes itself as a radical feminist organization, and has been described by critics as transphobic and TERF. The organisation has described hormone therapy for transgender youth as eugenics and excludes transgender women from women's spaces, while Keith has compared gender transitioning to mutilation. In 2019, Jensen, Keith, as well as DGR activist Max Wilbert published an article in Feminist Current saying "Hands up everyone who predicted that when Big Brother arrived, he’d be wearing a dress, hauling anyone who refuses to wax his ladyballs before a human rights tribunal, and bellowing ‘It’s Ma’am!’" Keith linked the group's views on transgender issues to the environment, claiming that trans women "want to violate the basic boundaries of women" and comparing that to "violating the boundaries of forests and rivers and prairies". During the fight against the Thacker Pass lithium mine, some members of DGR formed another group called Protect Thacker Pass without disclosing their affiliation with DGR. They worked with local Native American group People of Red Mountain, which broke off the affiliation saying that DGR members had not been transparent about their anti-trans views.

In 2012, founder McBay left the group, saying that it promoted transphobia. Earth First! Journal repudiated DGR in 2013 and said that it would "no longer print or in any way promote DGR material" because of its leaders' anti-transgender stances. In 2022, during the resistance to the Thacker Pass Lithium Mine, Indigenous group People of Red Mountain broke ties with attorney and DGR member Will Falk, citing transphobia as the reason. Other environmental groups involved in opposing the Thacker Pass project have distanced themselves from DGR. The organization has also faced criticism for its association with Jennifer Bilek, an investigative journalist, who has, with antisemitic connotations, argued that transgender rights are a transhumanist conspiracy.

== See also ==
- Deep ecology
- Ecofeminism
- Eco-terrorism
- Luddite
- Radical environmentalism
- Ecofascism
