= Leigh Phillips =

British composer

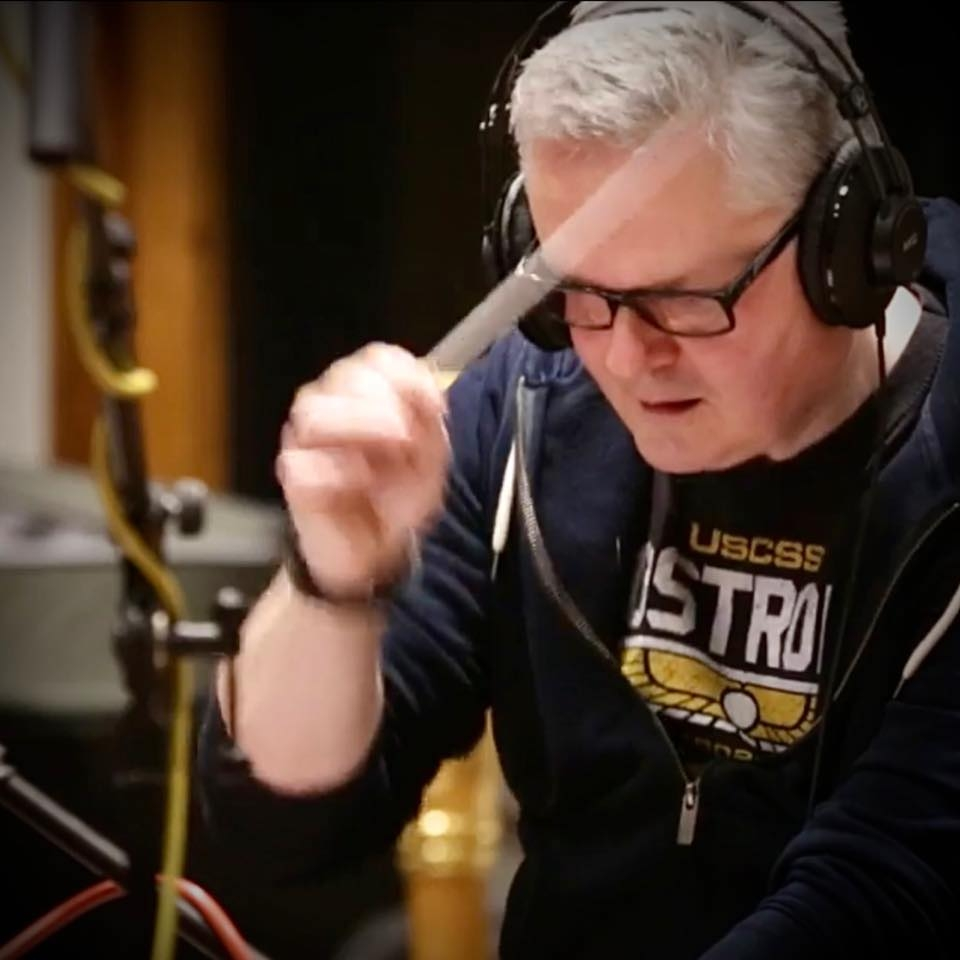
- 2024
- Born: August 14, 1973 (age 53); South Wales
- Education: Royal Welsh College of Music & Drama; London College of Music
- Occupation: Composer/ Orchestrator

Leigh Phillips is a composer, orchestrator, and conductor of music for film, media, and theatre. In addition to this, he is responsible for developing unique orchestrations, and arrangements, of film-music for live concert performance and recording.

== Career ==
Previous collaborations have included the, BAFTA Award-winning, composer John Ottman, Grammy Award-winning television composer Joe Harnell, The Halle Orchestra, The Golden State Pops Orchestra, The London Philharmonic Orchestra, soundtrack producers Silva Screen Records and Tadlow Music; his orchestrations and arrangements featuring in productions by companies such as Decca Records, SKY, IMAX, ITV, Channel 4, Prometheus Records, Classic FM, Orchestra Sinfonica di Milano, Fimucite Film Music Festival, Movie Score Malaga, Film Music Prague Festival, World Soundtrack Awards, the BBC, and Marvel Studios.

=== Film score reconstructions ===
One particularly prominent feature of Phillips' career has been his involvement in the reconstruction of classic (and previously unreleased) film scores (based on available information, he has reconstructed more Jerry Goldsmith and Miklos Rozsa film scores than any other individual). Some notable examples of reconstruction projects (both complete scores and compilation albums) that have utilised his orchestrations, include:

- The Ipcress File (John Barry)
- The Chairman (Jerry Goldsmith)
- Pursuit/ Crawlspace/ The People next Door (Jerry Goldsmith)
- Black Patch/ The Man (Jerry Goldsmith)
- World Soundtrack Awards - Laurence Rosenthal (Laurence Rosenthal)
- Séance on a Wet Afternoon (John Barry)
- Goldsmith at the General Electric Theater vol. 1-7 (Jerry Goldsmith)
- King of Kings (Miklos Rozsa)
- Damnation Alley - vintage synth programming (Jerry Goldsmith)
- Sodom & Gomorrah (Miklos Rozsa)
- The Curse of Frankenstein (James Bernard)
- Dracula (James Bernard)
- Thriller - vol. 2 (Jerry Goldsmith)
- Ben Hur (Miklos Rozsa)
- Thriller - vol.1 (Jerry Goldsmith)
- The Thief of Bagdad (Miklos Rozsa)
- Lawrence of Arabia (Maurice Jarre)
- The Blue Max (Jerry Goldsmith)
- Conan the Barbarian (Basil Poledouris)
- Taras Bulba (traditional folk-song arrangements)
- Quo Vadis' (Miklos Rozsa)
- The Salamander (Jerry Goldsmith)
- Public Access (John Ottman)

=== Other musical projects ===
Other orchestration & composition projects have included:

- Rock Bottom - [additional music] (Feature Film)
- Netflix Animation Studio Logo (ident)
- Superklaus - [additional music] (Feature Film)
- Cowboy Bebop - Live (Concert)
- Reagan (Feature Film)
- Bau - Artist at War (Feature Film)
- Yooka Replaylee (Video Game)
- Homeworld 3 (Video Game)
- Mario & Rabbids (Video Game)
- Dustborn (Video Game)
- Moon Knight (Limited TV Series)
- Kira & El Gin (Feature Film)
- The Serengeti Rules (Documentary)
- West End Stars in Concert (Tour)
- The Bachelor King 3D (Film)
- Ice Age Giants (BBC Documentary)
- War Made Easy (Documentary)

=== Music education ===
Leigh was educated at the Welsh College of Music and Drama where he gained a BA (Wales) Degree specialising in composition, and also holds a Masters Degree in Film Music Composition from the London College of Music.

With a long-standing interest in music-education, he returned to The London College of Music as course leader for film-music composition (2014 - 2020), where he was responsible for developing the UK's first, film-music specific, Bachelor of Music Degree.

=== Other activities ===
When not orchestrating, or composing, Leigh can usually be found at Smecky Music Studios, fulfilling his other role as a freelance producer for film, TV, video game, and album recording sessions featuring The City of Prague Philharmonic Orchestra.

=== Awards ===
In 2014, Leigh was presented with the IFMCA Special Award for his work on the reconstruction of Jerry Goldsmith's score, 'The Salamander'; previous recipients of this award included Marc Shaiman & Scott Wittman, Haiti - The Symphony of Hope project, and James Horner. *Denotes 2006 Jerry Goldsmith Award for Best Achievement in Audio Visual Music
