= Dmae Roberts =

Taiwanese-American writer, actor, and playwright

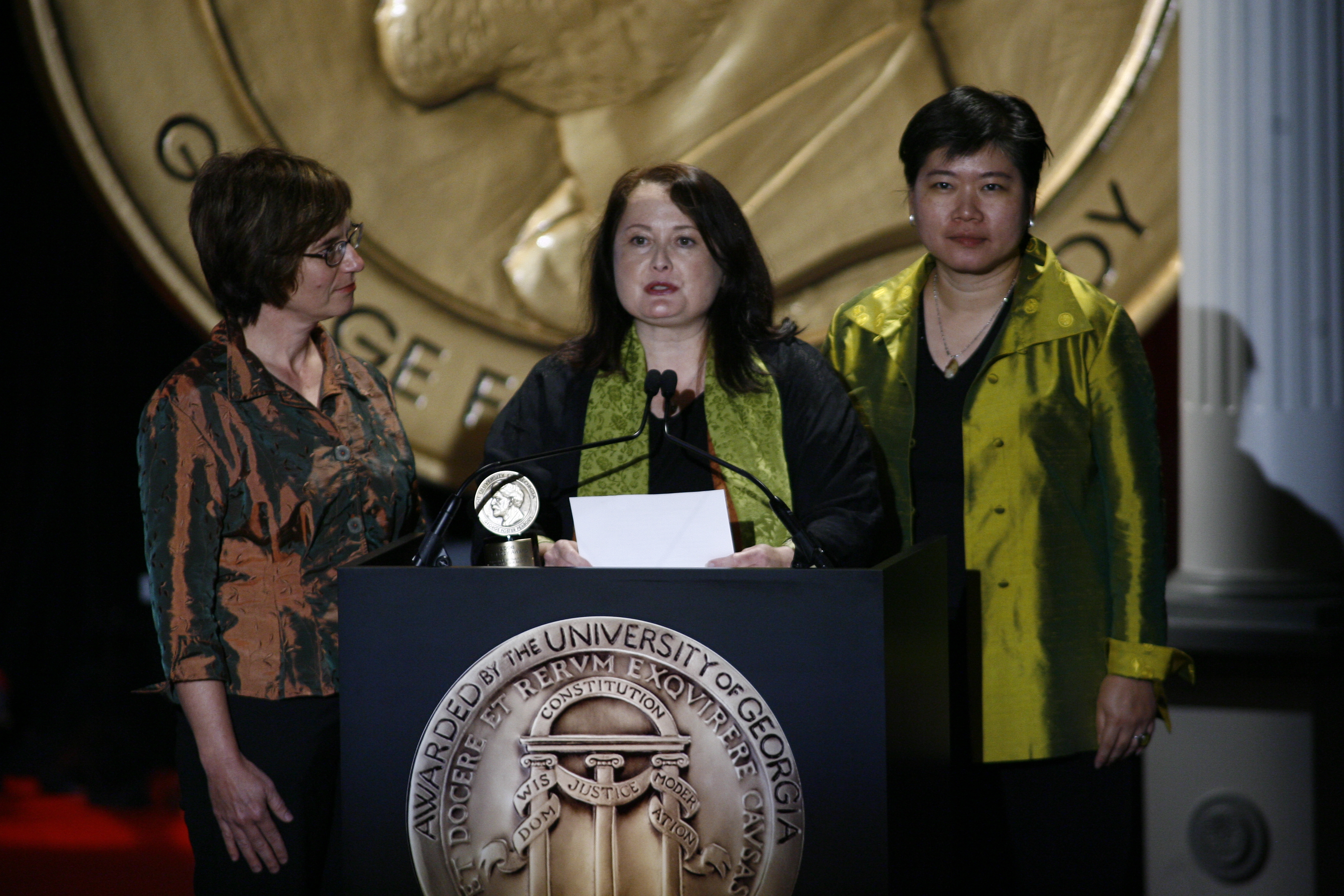
- Roberts' acceptance speech at the 66th Annual Peabody Awards
- Education: University of Oregon (BS)
- Occupations: Radio producer, writer, actress, playwright
- Writing career
- Pen name: D. Roberts

Dmae Roberts, aka D. Roberts, is a Taiwanese-American independent public radio producer, writer, actress and playwright. Much of her work focuses on cross-cultural issues or personal storytelling. Roberts was born in Taipei, Taiwan and grew up in Japan until she was eight. Her family moved to Junction City, Oregon when she was 10 years old. Roberts moved to Eugene, Oregon and graduated from the University of Oregon with a B.S. in journalism. Roberts relocated to Portland in 1989 to pursue her acting career while continuing to do her national radio work. She is executive producer of the nonprofit MediaRites. She is a member and former board member of the Association of Independents in Radio as well as a member of the Asian American Journalists Association.

== Radio work ==
More than 400 of Roberts' documentaries and audio art pieces have been featured on programs from National Public Radio and Public Radio International. In 1989, she produced "Mei Mei, A Daughter's Song", a documentary about her relationship with her mother and her mother's childhood in Taiwan, for which she received a George Foster Peabody Award. She also received a Peabody for her eight-hour series about Asian-American history, Crossing East. The series aired in 2006 and on more than 230 public radio stations. It was the first and only Asian American history series to air on public radio.

Other works by Roberts include "Coming Home: The Return of the Alutiiq Masks," which tells the story of the Alutiiq people of Kodiak, Alaska, and was a co-production with Koahnic Broadcasting and KNBA in Anchorage. The hour-long program aired on 180 radio stations across the country. In 2008, Roberts produced a piece called "Secret Asian Woman" that explores her mixed race identity.

Roberts is also the executive producer of MediaRites, "a non-profit media arts organization dedicated to telling the stories of diverse cultures and giving voice to the unheard." Among MediaRites' outreach projects was "The Breast Cancer Monologues", in which women with breast cancer shared their experiences with the disease. This work was a 2004 winner of the Golden Reel award from the National Federation of Community Broadcasters.

Since 1996, Roberts has hosted "Stage & Studio" a weekly radio program on KBOO about the performing, literary, and media arts. She features nearly 100 artists and arts organizations each year.

== Writing ==
Roberts' written work has been featured in Oregon Humanities and she writes a regular column for The Asian Reporter. In 2010, her work was included in the Reality Radio anthology published by UNC Press. Her play "Breaking Glass" was published by Temple University Press in the anthology of American plays "But Still, Like Air, I'll rise" edited by Velina Hasu Houston.

== Theatre ==
Roberts is an actress and the author of numerous plays. In 1991, she wrote a multimedia stage play called "Mei Mei" for the Interstate Firehouse Cultural Center in Portland that was an adaptation of her 1989 radio piece. In 1993, she continued writing about her family's early years in "Breaking Glass" at Portland Repertory Theatre. Her 1996 play, "Picasso in the Back Seat", produced at Artists Repertory Theatre, was a winner of the Oregon Book Award as well as a Portland Drama award.

== Honors and awards ==
- George Foster Peabody Award for Mei Mei: A Daughter's Song, 1990
- Drama Critics Circle Award for Merry Wives of Windsor, 1995
- Drama Critics Circle Award for Picasso in the Backseat, 1995
- Oregon Book Award for Picasso in the Backseat, 1996
- The Casey Medal for Meritorious Journalism for "Colin's World—The Lives of Children"
- Robert F. Kennedy Journalism Award, 1996
- Two Heart of America Awards/American Legion Auxiliary, 1998–1999
- National Lesbian/Gay Journalists Award for "Miracle on the Streets", 2003
- Two Clarion Awards, Writers Digest Award, 2000–2004
- National Federation of Community Broadcasters, Silvers/Gold for "Miracle on the Streets," "Living Flag," and "Breast Cancer Monologues"
- Two Asian American Journalists Association Awards, 2005–2006
- George Foster Peabody Award for Crossing East, 2007
- Dr. Suzanne Award for Civil Rights and Social Justice from the Asian American Journalists Association, 2007
- United States Artists Rockefeller Fellow, 2007
