= Sustainable House Day =

Annual national event in Australia

Sustainable House Day is a national event held annually across Australia, where households open their doors to the public to give interested people the chance to learn about the benefits of energy efficiency, renewable energy and sustainable design and how to apply it in their own homes. Participants have the opportunity to speak with sustainable home owners, architects, builders, designers and energy auditors to learn about sustainable living.

It began in 1994 as Solar House Day, showcasing early solar homes. As the way we design and live in homes has evolved, so has the event, expanding to include energy efficiency, electrification, passive design, materials, and climate resilience.

Today, it’s coordinated by Renew and supported by councils and community groups who help activate the event in local areas across the country.

The 2026 date is May 17.
