= Reese Erlich =

American journalist (1947–2021)

- Born: July 5, 1947
- Died: April 6, 2021 (aged 73)
- Occupations: author, journalist

Reese Erlich (July 5, 1947 – April 6, 2021) was an American author and freelance journalist who wrote for CBS Radio, Australian Broadcasting Corp., and National Public Radio. He also contributed to Foreign Policy and VICE News. He wrote the nationally distributed Foreign Correspondent column. Erlich won numerous journalism awards including a Peabody.

== Biography ==
Erlich was born and raised in Los Angeles. In 1965 he enrolled at the University of California, Berkeley, and later became active in the Anti-Vietnam War movement. In October 1967 Erlich and others organized Stop the Draft Week. They were arrested and became known as the "Oakland Seven". In their trial they were acquitted of all charges, being successfully represented by Charles Garry.

In 1968 he visited Cuba for the first time, which led to a continuing interest in that country that would eventually lead to a book called Dateline Havana (2009).

In 1968-9 Erlich worked as a staff writer and research editor for Ramparts, a national investigative reporting magazine published in San Francisco. His magazine articles have appeared in Vanity Fair online, San Francisco Magazine, California Monthly, Mother Jones, The Progressive, The Nation, and AARP's Segunda Juventud. He writes a nationally distributed column Foreign Correspondent.

Erlich's book Target Iraq: What the News Media Didn't Tell You, co-authored with Norman Solomon, became a best seller in 2003. His book The Iran Agenda: the Real Story of U.S. Policy and the Middle East Crisis was published in October 2007 with a foreword by Robert Scheer. In a San Francisco Chronicle book review, Ruth Rosen wrote, "Some people are treated as pariahs when they tell the truth; later, history lauds them for their courage and convictions. Reese Erlich is one of those truth tellers." Erlich's book Dateline Havana: The Real Story of US Policy and the Future of Cuba came out in January 2009.

Erlich's fifth book, Inside Syria: the Backstory of Their Civil War and What the World Can Expect (Prometheus Books, foreword by Noam Chomsky), was published in 2014. In a starred review of Inside Syria, Publishers Weekly wrote, Erlich's "insights and conclusions are objective and valuable. The book is essential reading for anyone interested in understanding the current turmoil in the Middle East."

The Iran Agenda Today: the Real Story from Inside Iran and What's Wrong with U.S. Policy, was published in September 2018.

Erlich worked with Walter Cronkite on four public radio documentaries. Cronkite has written, "Reese Erlich is a great radio producer and a great friend."

Since 1995, Erlich has produced Jazz Perspectives for public radio stations and online through Jazz Corner. Jazz Perspectives are produced features profiling jazz, blues and Latin musicians. From 2015 to 2017 he wrote an arts and culture column for The East Bay Monthly magazine.

Erlich died in April 2021 at the age of 73 after a short battle with cancer.

== Books ==
- The Iran Agenda Today: the Real Story from Inside Iran and What's Wrong with U.S. Policy, was published September 2018, forewords by Robert Scheer and William Beeman. (Routledge press)
- Inside Syria: the Backstory of Their Civil War and What the World Can Expect was published in hardcover by Prometheus Books in October 2014, foreword by Noam Chomsky. It was issued in paperback, including a 5000-word afterword, in 2016.
- Conversations with Terrorists: Middle East Leaders on Politics, Violence and Empire, Polipoint Press, Sept. 14, 2010, ISBN 978-0-9824171-3-3 In a review, Publishers Weekly wrote, “Using decades of his personal reporting, personal interviews, and new research, ... Erlich efficiently unearths some of the most problematic and overlooked narratives about terrorism.”
- Dateline Havana: The Real Story of U.S. Policy and the Future of Cuba, Polipoint Press, 2009, ISBN 978-0-9815769-7-8
  - Review: Dateline Havana on Foreign Policy In Focus
- The Iran Agenda: The Real Story of U.S. Policy and the Middle East Crisis, Polipoint Press, 2007, ISBN 978-0-9778253-5-6
- Target Iraq: What the News Media Didn't Tell You (co-authored with Norman Solomon), Context Books, 2003, ISBN 978-1-893956-39-1 This book is translated to Persian language by Iranian journalist Mohammad Reza Noroozpour.

== Major radio documentaries ==
- "Inside Syria", 50-minute radio documentary with a first hand report on the Syrian uprising, which aired on the Australian Broadcasting Corp. program 360
- "Who Won the Egyptian Revolution?" Making Contact Radio
- "Lessons from Hiroshima 60 Years Later", a one-hour radio documentary hosted by Walter Cronkite and distributed by Public Radio International.
- "Security Check: Confronting Today's Global Threats," 10-minute segment on drugs and small arms in Colombia.
- "Reaching for Peace in the Holy Land," a half-hour documentary hosted by Walter Cronkite and distributed by Public Radio International.
- "Children of War: Fighting, Dying, Surviving," a one-hour documentary hosted by Charlayne Hunter-Gault and distributed to over 200 public radio stations in the US, Canada and Australia.
- "The Russia Project," a two-hour documentary hosted by Walter Cronkite, distributed to over 200 public radio stations.
- "The Iran Project," a one-hour documentary hosted by Walter Cronkite, distributed to 170 public radio stations.
- Produced two, one-hour documentaries on the life of Louis Armstrong as part of the Louis Armstrong Centennial Radio Project airing on NPR.
- One hour documentary on the life of Cuban pianist Chucho Valdés for NPR's Jazz Profiles.
- One hour documentary on the life of guitarist Jim Hall for NPR's Jazz Profiles.
- One hour documentary on the life of Buddy Collette for NPR's Jazz Profiles.

== Journalism awards and grants ==
- In 2018 the California Senate passed a resolution honoring Erlich's journalism work.
- 2013–2017 Erlich received grants from the Pulitzer Center on Crisis Reporting for his coverage of Syria, Bahrain and Iran.
- 2012 The Society of Professional Journalists (Northern Calif.) gave Erlich an award for best radio explanatory journalism for his documentary "Inside the Syrian Revolution."
- 2011 Erlich received two grants from the Pulitzer Center on Crisis Reporting to cover the Arab Spring uprisings.
- 2010 Erlich and co-author Peter Coyote won an honorable mention from Project Censored for their 2009 article in Vanity Fair Online entitled “Murders at Al-Sukariya.”
- 2006 Peabody Award, shared with producers of Crossing East, a public radio documentary describing the history of Asians in the U.S.
- Clarion Award presented by the Association for Women in Communications for the public radio documentary "Children of War". (2006)
- Second and third place from the National Headliner Awards in the Best Documentary and War Coverage categories (2004) for "Children of War".
- Project Censored at Sonoma State University, eighth most censored story in America in 2002–03 for article "Hidden Killers" about U.S. use of depleted uranium.
- Depth reporting prize for broadcast journalism awarded by the Northern California Chapter of the Society of Professional Journalists (2002) for public radio documentary The Russia Project hosted by Walter Cronkite.
- Bronze World Medal in the national/international news category from the New York Festivals (2002) for The Russia Project.
- Second place in the Chicago International Film Festival investigative reporting category (1996) for Erlich's TV documentary "Prison Labor/Prison Blues."
