= Lierre Keith =

American radical feminist

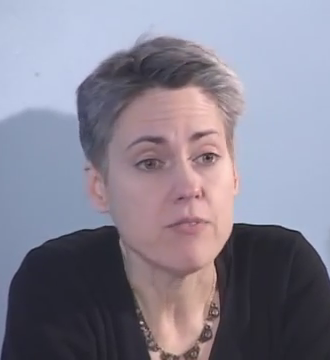
- Keith (May 2011)
- Born: 1964 (age 61–62)
- Education: Brookline High School
- Organizations: Women's Liberation Front; Deep Green Resistance
- Notable work: The Vegetarian Myth
- Movement: Radical feminism, trans-exclusionary radical feminism
- Website: www.lierrekeith.com

Lierre Keith (/liˈɛər/; born 1964) is an American writer, radical feminist, anti-transgender activist, and food activist.

== Biography ==
She began her public involvement in the feminist movement as the founding editor of Vanessa and Iris: A Journal for Young Feminists (1983–1985). During that period, she worked with the Women Against Violence Against Women group in Cambridge, participating in educational events and protest campaigns. In 1984, she was a founding member of Minor Disturbance, a feminist-perspective protest group against militarism. In 1986, she was a founding member of Feminists Against Pornography in Northampton, Massachusetts. She is among the founding editors of Rain and Thunder, a radical feminist journal in Northampton, Massachusetts.

As a radical feminist Keith has made numerous appearances, interviews, and speeches around the U.S. and Canada.

Keith was an early public advocate of the U.S. local food movement. In a 2006 Boston Globe report, she said, "I like knowing that I'm supporting the local economy, and not corporate America."

Her views have been criticized by some vegetarians, in what one journalist has called a "Vegan War". During a presentation of her book The Vegetarian Myth at the 2010 Bay Area Anarchist Bookfair, protesters hit Keith with chili pepper-laced pies. Keith responded by denouncing the act as "coward" and asking her assailants to direct their "herbivorous rage" at the powerful.

== The Vegetarian Myth ==
Keith's 2009 book The Vegetarian Myth: Food, Justice, and Sustainability is a controversial examination of the ecological effects of agriculture and vegetarianism. In The Vegetarian Myth, she offers evidence of agriculture destroying entire eco-systems, such as the North American prairie. She also argues in favour of animal agriculture over plant agriculture, citing that the latter destroys topsoil, while animal farming rebuilds it.

== Deep Green Resistance ==
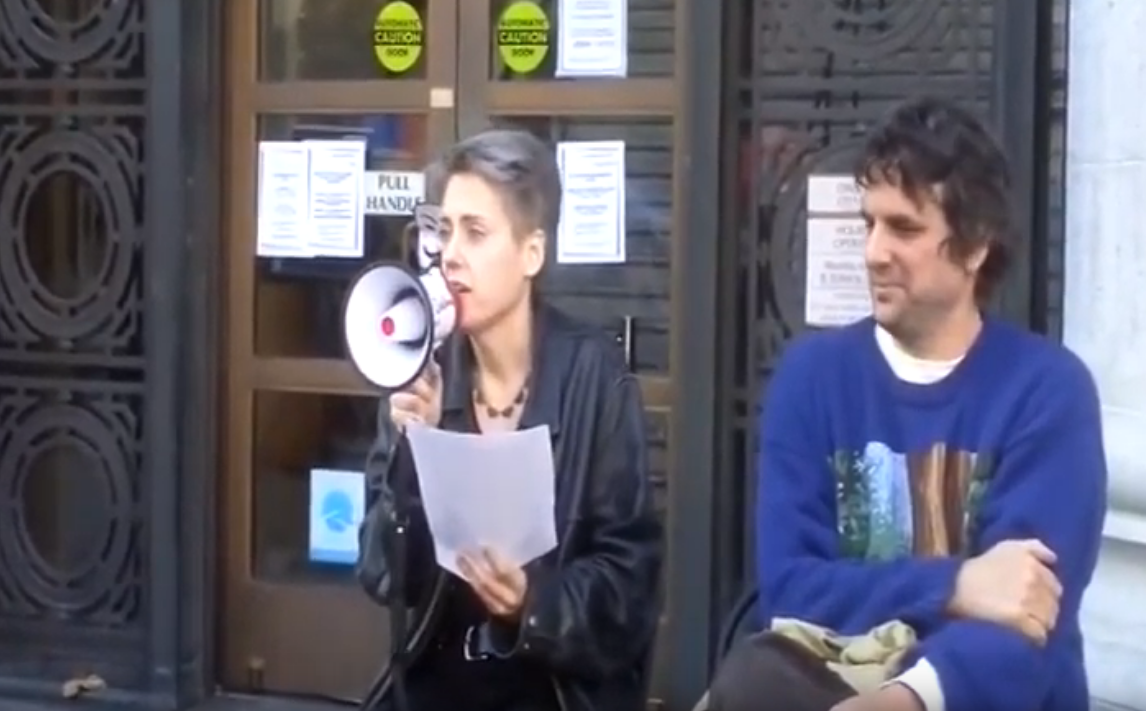
Lierre Keith (left) and Derrick Jensen (right) with Deep Green Resistance at Occupy Oakland in 2011

Keith is associated with the Deep Green Resistance movement, and together with Aric McBay and Derrick Jensen, she co-wrote Deep Green Resistance: Strategy to Save the Planet, published in May 2011. The book describes itself as a "manual on how to build a resistance movement that will bring down industrial civilization and save the planet", and "evaluates strategic options for resistance, from non-violence to guerrilla warfare, and the conditions required for those options to be successful".

After the publication of this book, the authors co-founded an organization by the same name. McBay left the organization in early 2012, saying he disagreed with Jensen and Keith's cancellation of a transgender-inclusive policy. Deep Green Resistance has disputed this account, saying that the women's safe space policy was one issue among many, and that the decision to restrict women's spaces was made by the women of DGR, and not by Jensen or Keith.

== Women's Liberation Front ==
Keith is a founder of the Women's Liberation Front, and, as of 2021, serves as its chair. Women's Liberation Front has been described as an hate group by the University of Wisconsin Law School QLaw student organization and the Gender Justice League.

== Works ==
- Bright Green Lies: How the Environmental Movement Lost Its Way and What We Can Do About It by Derrick Jensen, Lierre Keith, and Max Wilbert (Monkfish Book Publishing Company). 2021.
- Earth at Risk: Building a Resistance Movement to Save the Planet (edited by L.K. and Derrick Jensen), PM Press, 2012, ISBN 978-1-60486-674-2
- Deep Green Resistance: Strategy to Save the Planet (written by L.K., Derrick Jensen and Aric McBay), Seven Stories Press, 2011, ISBN 978-1-58322-929-3
- The Vegetarian Myth, PM Press, 2009, ISBN 978-1-60486-080-1
- Skyler Gabriel, Fighting Words Pr, 1995, ISBN 978-0-9632660-2-6
- Conditions of War, Fighting Words Pr, 1993, ISBN 978-0-9632660-1-9
