= War on Iraq: What Team Bush Doesn't Want You to Know =

- Cover of the first edition
- Author: William Rivers Pitt
- Language: English
- Subject: Politics
- Publisher: Context Books
- Publication date: September 2002
- Publication place: United States
- Media type: Print (paperback)
- Pages: 78 (first edition)
- ISBN: 1-893956-38-5

War on Iraq: What Team Bush Doesn't Want You to Know is short book, written in 2002, by William Rivers Pitt and featuring an extensive interview with former United Nations weapons inspector Scott Ritter. In it Pitt and Ritter examine the Bush administration's justifications for war with Iraq and call for a diplomatic solution instead of war. Ritter argues that Iraq once possessed many unconventional arms but they have either been destroyed or degraded. Therefore, the government's claims that Iraq had vast stockpiles of "weapons of mass destruction" were "shaky at best." In reviewing this book, The Guardian called it "the most comprehensive independent analysis of the state of knowledge about Iraq's weapons programmes until the new team of inspectors went back." Along with another book published by Context Books, The New York Times singled out War on Iraq: What Team Bush Doesn't Want You to Know as an anti-war book that "emerged from, and then codified opposition to the war in Iraq."

== See also ==
- Mass Deception: Moral Panic and the US War on Iraq
