= After Dachau =

- First edition (publ. Context Books)
- Author: Daniel Quinn
- Publisher: Context Books
- Publication date: January 1, 2001
- Pages: 192
- ISBN: 978-1-893956-13-1

After Dachau is a 2001 novel written by American author Daniel Quinn.

== Plot summary ==
The story is narrated by a young rich man, heir to a huge sum of money. He devotes his life to an organization called "We Live Again" which investigates reincarnation. People have souls that pass on to other individuals and give them their memories, usually alongside, but sometimes in place of their own memories.

The story focuses on Mallory Gabus, a recently reincarnated woman, and her integration into the new world. She recalls and narrates her experiences and memories of Hitler's victory, which allowed Hitler to bring his desire for an "Aryan" world to fruition, and realizes all that went wrong. The Nazis had won World War II and purged their empire of all non-whites, then rewrote history so as to say that Dachau, a concentration camp, was instead a battle with Adolf Hitler as its hero.

After Hitler's victory, the Third Reich is solely Aryan, the Aryans have killed all non-Aryans in their new empire. They now use A.D. to refer to After Dachau, the turning point in their civilization, and "A.D.-A.D." to refer to our A.D.

Mallory was (re-)born in 1922 A.D.-A.D. as an Afro-American woman in New York.

The Nazi purges in the Third Reich have started to have a cultural effect on the United States, and soon Jews are being executed. Blacks are being "repatriated", which means that they are being placed into concentration camps. Mallory hides out with her lover in the New York City underground and makes a life until their hiding place is discovered by police. At that point, they commit suicide rather than being taken alive or executed.

Jason Tull, the protagonist, in an attempt to publicize the story and the atrocities the Aryans committed, contacts a newspaper and other news media. His investigation gets him sequestered in an unknown location until he can write three words upon a chalkboard: "No One Cares", and, as it turns out, no one does.

The narrator explains that he cares, and he doesn't care if others don't care, he is still going to pursue this for his own personal interest. He opens an exhibit displaying relics from the old world, including works by Jewish authors such as Albert Einstein and Sigmund Freud.

The narrator receives a gift from his "uncle" (the man who imprisoned him), and expresses his intent to publish the gift. He opens a shop where he displays pictures of Africans that had been saved in Mallory's hideout.

Finally, one night, someone throws a brick through the gallery's windows, prompting the narrator to conclude that somebody "does care". The last line reveals that the gift is The Diary of a Young Girl, written during World War II, better known as the Diary of Anne Frank.

== See also ==
- Axis victory in World War II
