= War Made Easy: How Presidents & Pundits Keep Spinning Us to Death =

2007 documentary film by Loretta Alper and Jeremy Earp

- Film poster
- Directed by: Loretta Alper; Jeremy Earp
- Written by: Loretta Alper; Jeremy Earp
- Based on: War Made Easy: How Presidents and Pundits Keep Spinning Us to Death by Norman Solomon
- Produced by: Loretta Alper
- Narrated by: Sean Penn
- Edited by: Andrew Killoy
- Music by: John Van Eps; Leigh Phillips
- Production company: Media Education Foundation
- Release date: May 14, 2007
- Running time: 72 minutes
- Country: United States
- Language: English

War Made Easy: How Presidents & Pundits Keep Spinning Us to Death is a 2007 American anti-war documentary film written and directed by Loretta Alper and Jeremy Earp, based on the book of the same name by Norman Solomon. The film is produced by Alper and narrated by Sean Penn. It premiered in New York City on May 14, 2007, before a limited release on August 24, 2007.

== Synopsis ==
The film attempts to expose how the American government over 50 years has tried to strum up war effort using the media as a tool. "War Made Easy gives special attention to parallels between the Vietnam war and the war in Iraq."

== Reception ==
=== Critical response ===
On the review aggregator website Rotten Tomatoes, 88% of 16 critics' reviews are positive, with an average rating of 7.3/10. Metacritic, which uses a weighted average, assigned the film a score of 57 out of 100, based on 5 critics, indicating "mixed or average" reviews.

Jeannette Catsoulis of The New York Times stated, "Unsubtle, condensed and bullet-point simple, War Made Easy avoids fancy visuals for a uniformly drab and dispiriting aesthetic. Sporadically narrated by Sean Penn (evincing all the personality of a potato), the movie is cinematically inert if ultimately persuasive." V.A. Musetto of the New York Post criticized the film as "conventional and one-sided". Aaron Hillis wrote for The Village Voice that the film is "sobering, straightforward, and a bit drab, but... it's also an entirely nonpartisan endeavor". Variety critic Dennis Harvey credited "Solomon's astute onscreen analysis" for driving the film.
