= A Language Older Than Words =

2000 book by Derrick Jensen

- Author: Derrick Jensen
- Publisher: Context Books
- Publication date: 2000
- Pages: 399
- ISBN: 978-1-893956-03-2

A Language Older Than Words is a non-fiction book by Derrick Jensen, first published in 2000. The author uses his own personal experience of abuse as a springboard for looking at civilization as a culture of abuse, exploring the connections between various atrocities. Jensen also urges his readers to reconnect with the land.
