= The Vegetarian Myth =

2009 book by Lierre Keith

The Vegetarian Myth: Food, Justice, and Sustainability
- Author: Lierre Keith
- Publisher: PM Press
- Publication date: 2009

The Vegetarian Myth: Food, Justice, and Sustainability is a 2009 book by Lierre Keith published by PM Press. Keith is an ex-vegan who believes that "veganism has damaged her health and others". Keith argues that agriculture is destroying not only human health but entire ecosystems, such as the North American prairie, and destroying topsoil. Keith also considers modern agriculture to be the root cause of slavery, imperialism, militarism, chronic hunger, and disease.

Keith argues humans should accept death as a necessary precursor to food in that "everyone will get eaten, sooner or later". In sum, her proposition is that herbivores eat grass, humans eat herbivores, and then (eventually) worms/bacteria/etc. eat humans.

== Reception ==
The book resulted in extreme controversy, going as far as Keith being physically assaulted at a book reading. Aric McBay says that Keith is not being provocative for the sake of it, rather she believes vegetarians have the right impulse but are misinformed about the facts. Ian Fitzpatrick wrote that the book is at the core about the unsustainable nature of modern agriculture, but is "disguised" as a treatise against vegetarianism. Susan Schenck said the book was "full of hard core indisputable research". She agrees with the book's discounting of the contested scientific hypothesis on the effects of cholesterol on coronary heart disease. She further agrees with the book's claims linking soy with several ailments. However, Schenck disagrees that vegetarians are necessarily unhealthy, believing each individual has different abilities to synthesize the needed nutrients from different foods. Patrick Nicholson writes that the book misinterprets scientific articles, cherry-picks facts, uses strawman arguments, and relies heavily on anecdotes and faulty generalisations. John Sanbonmatsu interprets Keith's rhetoric as apocalyptic and millenarian. He argues that Keith's nutritional arguments are grounded on anecdotes and lack proper scientific backing. Also, the book was translated into dozens of languages including Spanish, Italian, and Arabic. Registered Dietician Ginny Messina referred to the book as, "so packed with misinformation and confusion that refuting the claims could be another book itself," further stating that it includes, "page after page of contradictions, fabrications, and misinterpretations."
