= DeleteMe =

Online privacy service

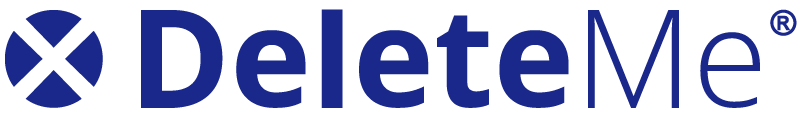
- Original authors: Rob Shavell; Eugene Kuznetsov; Andrew Sudbury
- Developer: Abine
- Release: 2010; 16 years ago
- Available in: English
- Website: joindeleteme.com

DeleteMe is an American internet data privacy service founded in 2010.

== History ==
DeleteMe was founded by Rob Shavell, Eugene Kuznetsov, and Andrew Sudbury in 2010. It is now an online privacy service provided by Abine.

== Platform ==
DeleteMe uses a user's personal details to reach out to data brokers through both automated methods and human intervention, requesting the removal of user data.

The DeleteMe platform can be accessed through a dashboard that displays updates on tracked data brokers, record reviews, and the current status of user data across various broker platforms. This dashboard also features graphical representations of data management over time. Users can also report unrecognized data brokers via the service's dashboard. In alignment with the California Privacy Rights Act of 2020, when DeleteMe identifies a new broker, users are notified and asked for permission to opt out from that broker.

== Reception ==
In 2018, DeleteMe was reviewed by Steven Petrow of USA Today. In 2021, DeleteMe was reviewed by Neil J. Rubenking of PCMag.

In 2024, a Consumer Reports study found that DeleteMe removed 27% of results from 13 tested people-search sites within 4 months of sign-up, compared to 70% for manual removals. Among similar services tested, DeleteMe was described as a "midlevel" performer. Consumer reports commented on DeleteMe's privacy policy, which allows for the sale or transfer of user data in the event of a business transaction, saying "Some privacy-minded subscribers might not want their information to be used this way."

In 2025, the New York Times Wirecutter review section called DeleteMe the "best data removal service," citing its ease of use and setup. "It’s comprehensive—covering names, addresses, and even relatives—but flexible enough that you don’t need to remember every little detail to reap the benefits," the review concluded.
