= Crossing East =

Public radio docuseries

Crossing East is an American documentary series for public radio produced by Dmae Roberts and MediaRites and hosted by George Takei and Margaret Cho. Covering Asian immigration to the U.S. from pre-nationhood to post-911, the series of eight one-hour documentaries delves into the many waves of Asian immigration into the United States and their impact on the making of America. The series also investigates the global implications of Asia-America immigration. The program's distribution partner is Public Radio International. This topic had never before been the focus of a series produced for public radio.

In 2007, the program was honored by winning a Peabody Award.
