= Mass Deception =

2010 book by Scott Bonn

- Author: Scott Bonn
- Publisher: Rutgers University Press
- Publication date: 2010
- Pages: 190
- ISBN: 978-0-8135-4788-6

Mass Deception: Moral Panic and the US War on Iraq is a 2010 book by Scott Bonn. The book argues that "the Bush administration created a panic by deliberately deceiving Americans about Iraq's possession of weapons of mass destruction (WMD) and its links to 9/11" through a novel model that explains how such claims are realized.

== See also ==
- Iraq War
- Iraq and weapons of mass destruction
