= Derrick Jensen (activist) =

American ecophilosopher

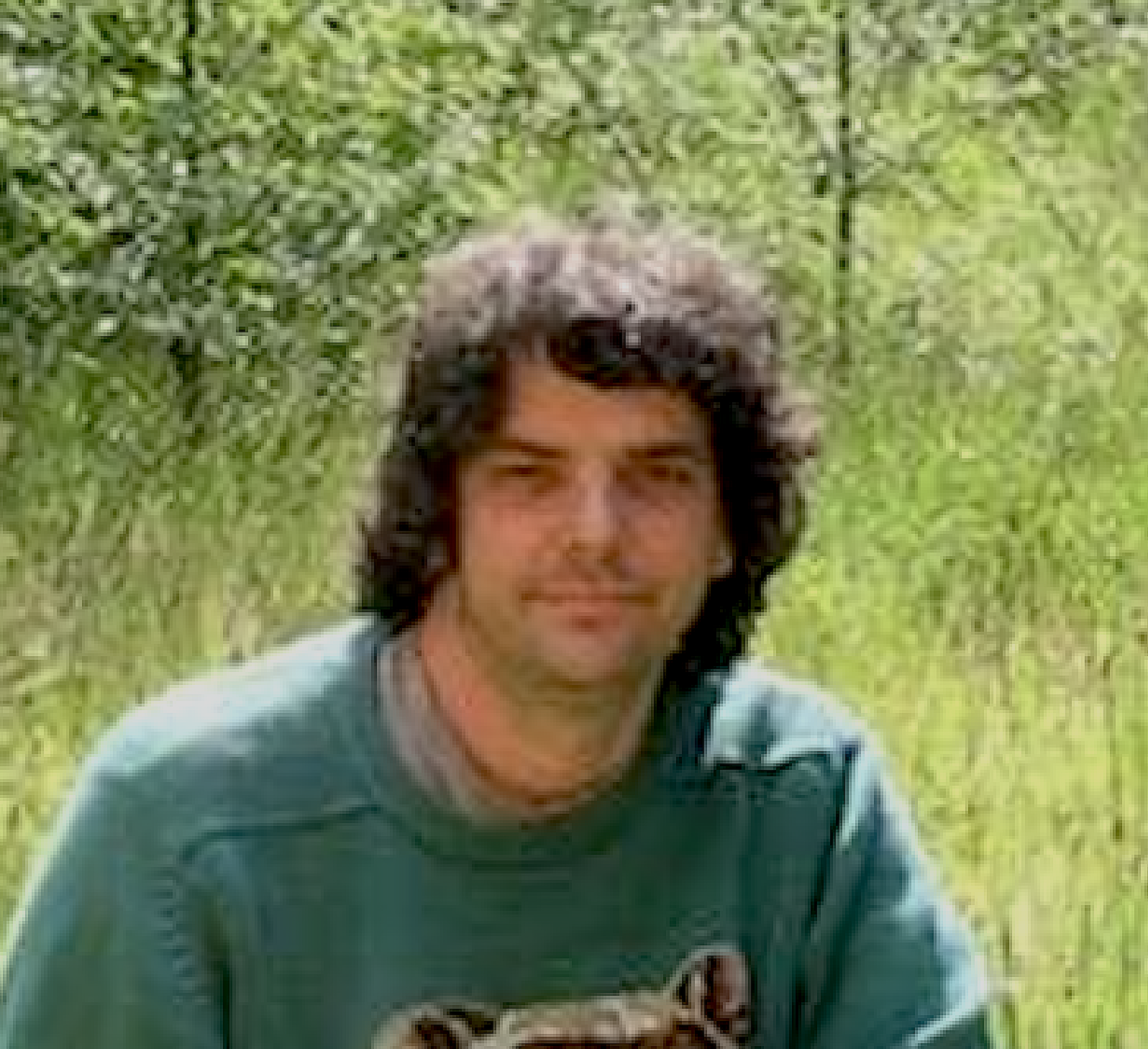
- Derrick Jensen
- Born: 1960 (age 65–66); Nebraska, United States
- Education: Colorado School of Mines (BSc); Eastern Washington University (MFA)
- Writing career
- Language: English
- Subjects: Environmentalism; Deep ecology; Feminism
- Website: derrickjensen.org

Derrick Jensen is an American environmental activist, author and ecophilosopher in the anarcho-primitivist tradition. He believes that human civilization is and has always been unsustainable for the planet.

== Early life ==
Derrick Jensen was born in 1960 in Nebraska and was raised in Colorado. He attended the Colorado School of Mines with a scholarship and graduated with a bachelor's degree in mineral engineering and physics. Even before graduating, he intended to become a writer. Jensen worked briefly in engineering and as a small commercial beekeeper. He became ill from Crohn's disease and had a slow recovery. His experience with the disease contributed to his approach towards Western culture. In 1991, Jensen received a Master of Fine Arts degree in creative writing from Eastern Washington University.

== Writing and activism ==
We don't think about the violence that makes the comforts and elegancies of our way of life happen. The world is being destroyed before our eyes, and it's really not that hard to tell the truth about it. It doesn't take that much courage.

— Derrick Jensen

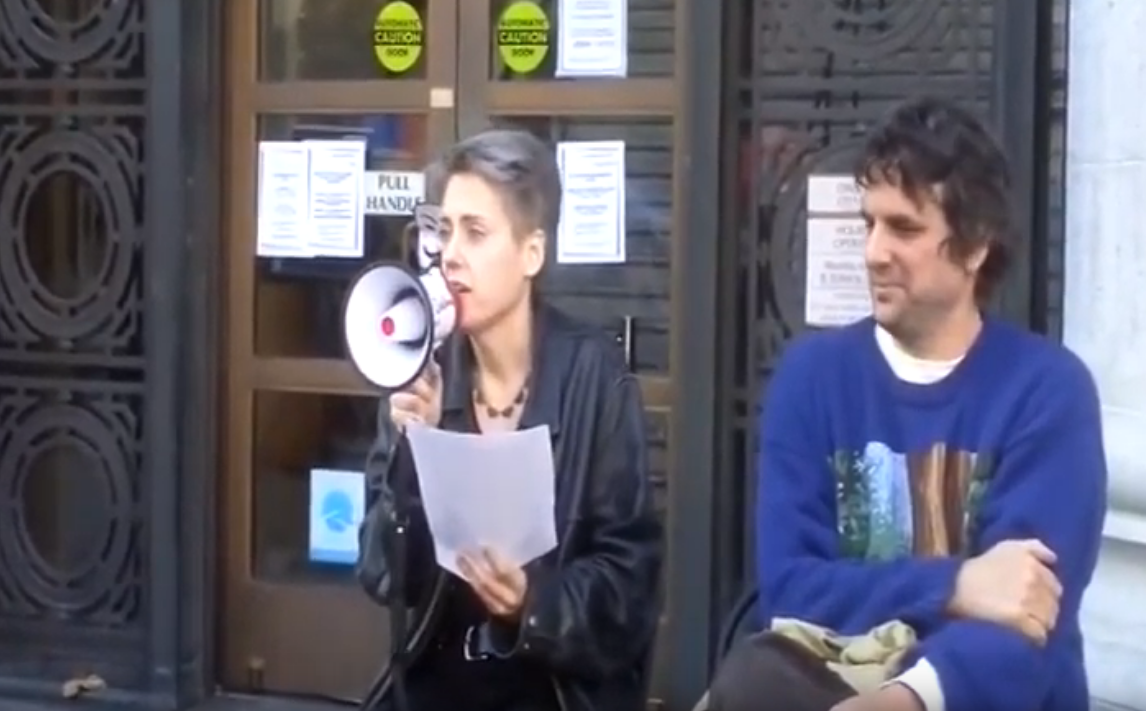
Lierre Keith (left) and Jensen (right) with Deep Green Resistance at Occupy Oakland in 2011

Jensen contends that human civilization is and has always been unsustainable for the planet. His writing and philosophy centers on the destructive tendencies of Western culture and how it proliferates between people and generations. His The Culture of Make Believe, a nonlinear composite of memoir and philosophy, outlines how Western culture was built upon brutality. Jensen has said this approach comes from wanting to be honest and "forthright without whining". When writing about massacres, slavery, and industrial forestry, he balances statistics and personal stories to "mix analysis with blood".

He wrote for two environmental organizations in 1995. A commission from an environmental organization led to his co-authored Railroads and Clearcuts, and Sierra Club Books published his interviews with activists, Listening to the Land. Jensen began A Language Older Than Words in 1996, published by Context Books in 2000. He described the book as beginning a trilogy, starting with how to be "sane in a crazy culture", followed by what one sees by becoming sane (The Culture of Make Believe), followed by what to do about what one sees.

Jensen is a critic of the mainstream environmental movement's focus on preserving civilization and technology over preserving the natural world. He promotes civil disobedience, radical activism, and dismantling infrastructure on a massive level in order to halt what he has called "the murder of the planet".

Lierre Keith and Jensen co-founded Deep Green Resistance in 2011. His belief, and the organization's position, that women-only spaces should exclude trans women has drawn criticism.

=== Reception ===
Utne Reader named Jensen among "50 Visionaries Who Are Changing the World" in 2008, and Democracy Now! says that he "has been called the poet-philosopher of the ecology movement".

== Personal life ==
Jensen lives in Crescent City, California, and has cats.

== Selected works ==
- with Draffan, George; Osborn, John (1995). Railroads and clearcuts: Legacy of Congress's 1864 Northern Pacific Railroad land grant. Spokane, Wash. Sandpoint, Idaho: Inland Empire Public Lands Council / Keokee Company Publishing. ISBN 1-879628-08-2. OCLC 32546308.
- — (2000). A Language Older Than Words. New York: Context Books. ISBN 1-893956-03-2. OCLC 44078542. Republished by Chelsea Green in 2004 with ISBN 978-1-931498-55-5.
- — (2002). The culture of make believe. New York: Context Books. ISBN 1-893956-28-8. OCLC 48761707. Republished by Chelsea Green in 2004 with ISBN 978-1-931498-57-9.
- with Draffan, George (2003). Strangely like war: The global assault on forests. White River Junction, VT: Chelsea Green. ISBN 978-1-931498-45-6. OCLC 52464656.
- with Draffan, George (2004). Welcome to the machine: Science, surveillance, and the culture of control. White River Junction, VT: Chelsea Green. ISBN 1-931498-52-0. OCLC 54966302.
- — (2005). Walking on water: reading, writing, and revolution. White River Junction, VT: Chelsea Green. ISBN 978-1-931498-78-4. OCLC 58051191.
- with Tweedy-Holmes, Karen (2007). Thought to exist in the wild: Awakening from the nightmare of zoos. Santa Cruz, CA: No Voice Unheard. ISBN 978-0-9728387-1-9. OCLC 137341817.
- with McMillan, Stephanie (2007). As the world burns: 50 simple things you can do to stay in denial. New York: Seven Stories Press. ISBN 978-1-58322-777-0. OCLC 154705030.
- with McBay, Aric (2009). What we leave behind. New York: Seven Stories Press. ISBN 978-1-58322-867-8. OCLC 261176357.
- with McBay, Aric; Keith, Lierre (2011). Deep green resistance: Strategy to save the planet. New York: Seven Stories Press. ISBN 978-1-58322-929-3. OCLC 601132927.
- — (2011). Truths among us: Conversations on building a new culture. Oakland, CA: PM Press. ISBN 978-1-60486-299-7. OCLC 756915435.
- — (2017). Monsters: Short stories. Oakland, CA: PM Press. ISBN 978-1-62963-436-4. OCLC 987687487.
- —; Keith, Lierre; Wilbert, Max (2021). Bright Green Lies: How the Environmental Movement Lost Its Way and What We Can Do About It. Monkfish. ISBN 978-1-94862-639-2.
