= Norman Solomon =

American journalist, media critic, antiwar activist

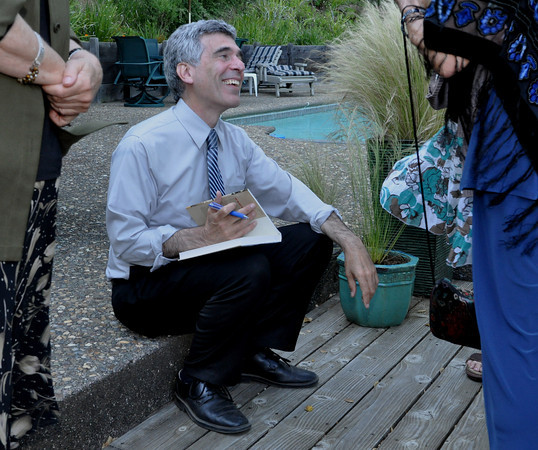
- Born: July 7, 1951 (age 75); Washington, D.C.
- Education: Reed College (Oregon)
- Occupations: Activist, writer, political candidate
- Known for: Founder and Executive Director, Institute for Public Accuracy
- Political party: Democratic

Norman Solomon (born July 7, 1951) is an American journalist, media critic, left-leaning progressive activist, and former U.S. Congress candidate. Solomon is a longtime associate of the media watch group Fairness & Accuracy In Reporting (FAIR). In 1997 he founded the Institute for Public Accuracy, which works to provide alternative sources for journalists, and serves as its executive director.

Solomon's weekly column, "Media Beat", was in national syndication from 1992 to 2009. In 2012, Solomon ran for Congress in California's 2nd congressional district. He attended the 2016 and 2020 Democratic National Conventions as a Bernie Sanders delegate. Since 2011, he has been the national director of RootsAction.org.

== Early life and activism ==
Solomon came under FBI scrutiny after he picketed for the desegregation of a Maryland apartment complex at age 14. He became aware of their surveillance later, through a Freedom of Information request. After high school, Solomon began a lifelong commitment to progressive activism. Solomon engaged in civil disobedience as part of the anti-nuclear movement, and eventually spent 40 days in jail as a result. He made eight trips to Moscow during the 1980s, including one during which he and a leader of an American group, the Alliance of Atomic Veterans, organized a sit-in at the U.S. Embassy, demanding that the U.S. join the Soviet Union in a halt to tests of nuclear bombs.

== Writer and media critic ==
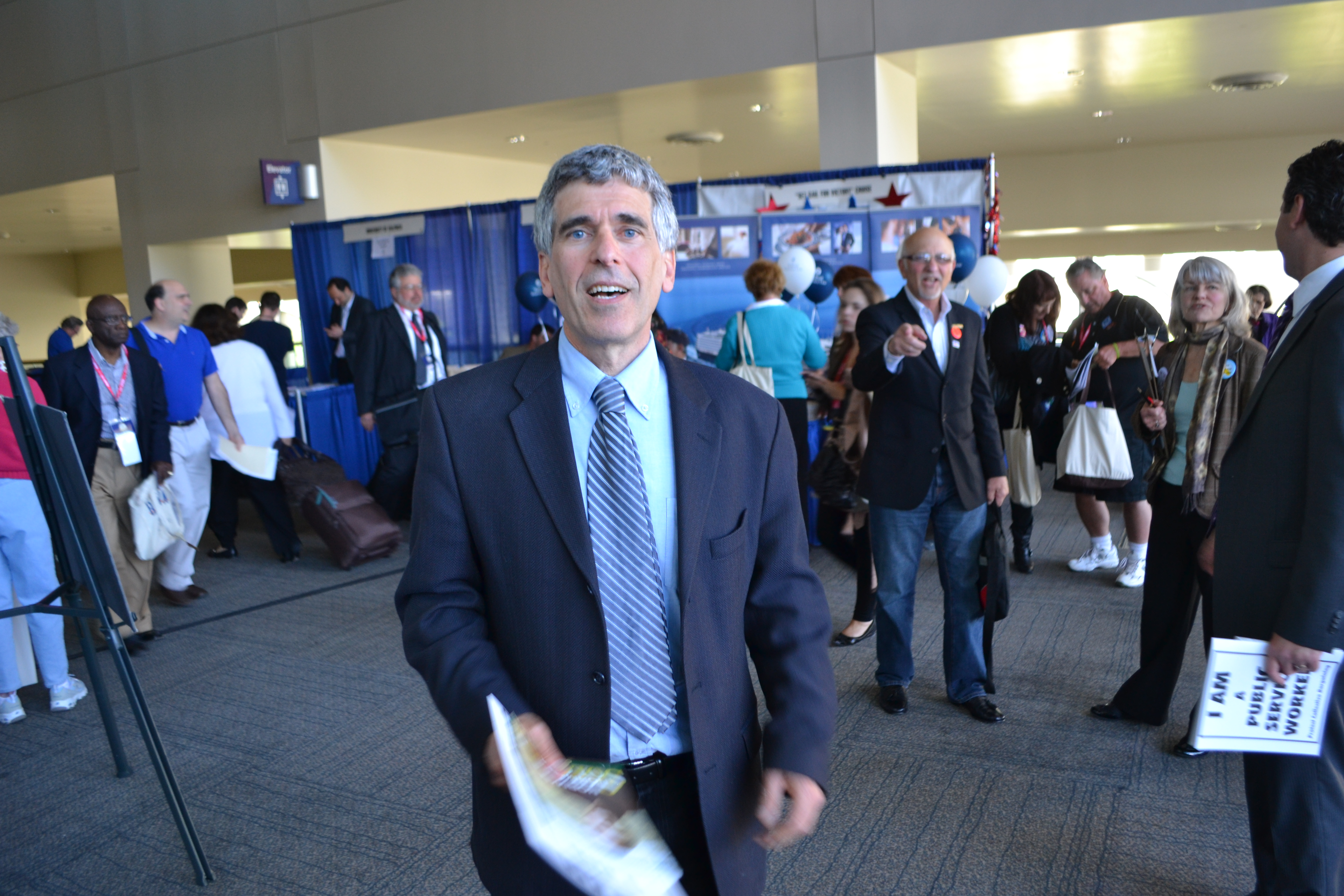
Solomon at the 2011 Democratic Party of California state convention

As a freelance journalist, Solomon reported for a number of years for Pacific News Service. In 1988, Solomon worked briefly as a spokesperson for the Alliance of Atomic Veterans in Washington, D.C. He was hired in August 1988 to run the new Washington, D.C., office of Fairness & Accuracy in Reporting. The author of fourteen books, his op-ed pieces have appeared in a range of newspapers, including the Los Angeles Times, The New York Times, San Francisco Chronicle, The Washington Post, and USA Today. His articles have been published by The Nation and other magazines. He is a frequent contributor to online outlets such as Common Dreams, Salon,The Hill, The Guardian and LA Progressive.

A book of Solomon's collected columns, The Habits of Highly Deceptive Media, won the 1999 George Orwell Award for Distinguished Contribution to Honesty and Clarity in Public Language. Jonathan Kozol's introduction to the book noted that "the tradition of Upton Sinclair, Lincoln Steffens, and I. F. Stone does not get much attention these days in the mainstream press ... but that tradition is alive and well in this collection of courageously irreverent columns on the media by Norman Solomon...." In 2000, Solomon teamed up with Robert Parry to write a series of investigative reports on George W. Bush's Secretary of State Colin Powell, published on Parry's website Consortium News.

Solomon's book Target Iraq: What the News Media Didn't Tell You (co-authored with Reese Erlich) was published in 2003 and translated into German, Italian, Hungarian, Portuguese, and Korean. War Made Easy: How Presidents and Pundits Keep Spinning Us to Death appeared in 2005. The Los Angeles Times called the book "a must-read for those who would like greater context with their bitter morning coffee, or to arm themselves for the debates about Iraq that are still to come." A documentary, narrated by Sean Penn, was based on the book, was released in 2007. War Made Invisible: How America Hides the Human Toll of Its Military Machine appeared in 2023. It details the extravagance of U.S. military efforts and targets the media coverage that masks or downplays their results or people. One review described it as "a companion to War Made Easy, updated to consider events in Afghanistan, Ukraine and other war zones." War Made Invisible received a starred review from Kirkus, which noted "Solomon makes a striking comparison between the American media’s strong interest in the losses endured by Ukrainian civilians after the recent Russian invasion and its indifference to the fate of Iraqi civilians after America’s invasion in 2003."

Solomon’s fourteenth book, The Blue Road to Trump Hell: How Corporate Democrats Paved the Way for Autocracy, was published in December 2025. With cartoons by Pulitzer Prize-wining political cartoonist Matt Wuerker, the book includes Solomon’s columns over a nine-year period. Solomon wrote in the book’s introduction: “The Democratic Party enabled Donald Trump to become president twice because of repetition compulsions that still plague the top echelons of the party—undermining its potential to end the real-life nightmare of MAGA control over the federal government. This book scrutinizes how the behavior of many Democrats assisted Trump’s electoral triumphs. That scrutiny is important not only for clarity about the past. It also makes possible a focus on ways that such failures can be avoided in the future. The Blue Road to Trump Hell is lined with warning signs that Democratic Party leaders and mass media routinely denied or ignored. I wrote the chapters from 2016 to 2024 in real time. Nothing has been revised for hindsight.”

Solomon is the founder and executive director of the Institute for Public Accuracy, an organization founded in 1997 "as a national consortium of independent public-policy researchers, analysts and activists." According to its web site, the mission of IPA is to increase "the reach and capacity of progressive and grassroots organizations (at no cost to them) to address public policy by getting them and their ideas into the mainstream media".

=== Peace missions to Iraq ===
As Executive Director of the Institute for Public Accuracy—which challenged Bush administration claims that Iraq possessed weapons of mass destruction—Solomon organized and led missions to Baghdad, seeking to avert the impending U.S. invasion. In mid-September 2002, he went with Congressman Nick Rahall (D-W.VA), former Senator James Abourezk (D-SD), and Conscience International President James Jennings to Baghdad, where they met with top officials of the Iraqi government, including Foreign Minister Tariq Aziz. Days later, Iraq gave a green light for UN inspectors to return to the country. In December 2002, Solomon accompanied actor and director Sean Penn to Baghdad in another attempt to foster dialogue and prevent a U.S.-led attack.

== 2012 congressional campaign ==
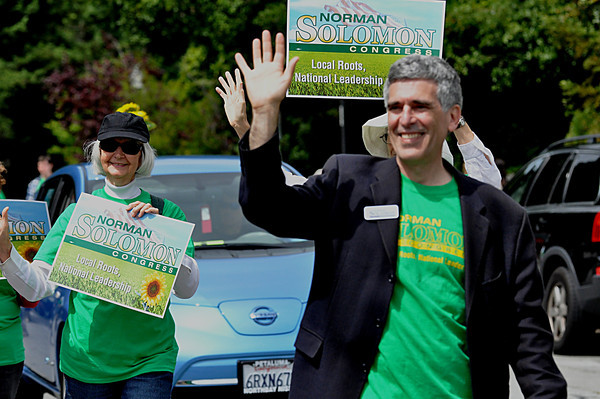
Solomon campaigning in the May 2011

On April 13, 2011, Solomon officially announced his candidacy for the open House seat in the newly created 2nd congressional district of California. Representative Lynn Woolsey—the incumbent from the former 6th congressional district, which was geographically expanded into the new 2nd district via redistricting—announced her retirement later in June, setting up a competitive Democratic primary in one of the more liberal districts in the country.

Observers expected Solomon to position himself to the left of his competitors and as the "philosophical heir" to Rep. Woolsey, a leader of the Congressional Progressive Caucus. In announcing his campaign Solomon himself argued, "After so many years of progressive leadership from Lynn Woolsey, her successor in the House should have a proven commitment to a wide range of progressive values." Solomon emphasized his strong environmentalist background and particularly his opposition to nuclear power, which he used to differentiate himself from his primary opponent Assemblyman Jared Huffman.

His overall fundraising strategy was patterned after those of Howard Dean and Barack Obama, as he sought to finance his campaign via small but continuous contributions from a large donor pool. Solomon failed to reach the general election, running third in the crowded primary, only 173 votes behind second place, with 14.9% of ballots cast, in the June 2012 California state elections. He followed eventual winner, Democratic state Assemblyman Jared Huffman (37.5%) and Republican Daniel Roberts with (15.0%). In California's newly implemented nonpartisan blanket primary, the top two vote recipients, regardless of party, proceed to compete in the general election.

== RootsAction.org ==
Solomon co-founded the online activist group Roots Action in early 2011; ten years later, it counted more than 1.3 million active members. With Solomon as RootsAction's coordinator, the group has addressed a wide range of concerns. In 2012, it generated more than 14,000 individual emails to the government of Ecuador as part of a successful campaign urging asylum in Ecuador's London embassy for WikiLeaks founder Julian Assange. In August 2013, Solomon delivered a RootsAction petition with more than 100,000 signers to the Nobel Committee in Oslo, urging that Chelsea Manning be awarded the Nobel Peace Prize. RootsAction was the first large U.S.-based online group to petition in support of NSA whistleblower Edward Snowden. In early 2014, RootsAction presented petitions (totaling 100,000 signers) to the State Department and Justice Department urging that the U.S. government restore Snowden's passport and end its efforts to capture him. By the end of the decade, RootsAction had organized many hundreds of online actions, including a #VoteTrumpOut initiative.

On June 4, 2014, Solomon was among the speakers at a news conference at the National Press Club in Washington, D.C., announcing the launch of ExposeFacts.org as an ongoing project of the Institute for Public Accuracy. In tandem with IPA, RootsAction hosted a news conference in Washington on August 14, 2014, announcing a petition with more than 100,000 signatures in support of New York Times reporter James Risen. At issue was the U.S. government's attempt to force Risen to testify against an alleged source, former CIA officer Jeffrey Sterling. C-SPAN aired the full 70-minute news conference, which was co-sponsored by the Institute for Public Accuracy and RootsAction.org. The October 27, 2014 edition of The Nation published a cover story by Solomon and investigative journalist Marcy Wheeler on the intertwined cases of Risen and Sterling as well as overall Obama administration policies toward the news media and whistleblowers ("The Government War Against Reporter James Risen").

In 2017, Solomon co-authored RootsAction's "Autopsy" report on the Democratic Party's 2016 Presidential defeat by Republican Donald Trump. The report attributed Trump's election to Republican voter suppression efforts and the Democratic Party’s failure to mobilize its base. After Biden gained the Democratic Party Presidential nomination, RootsAction launched the online "Vote Trump Out" campaign in swing states, with special attention to Arizona, Michigan and Wisconsin. Politico covered the "Vote Trump Out" campaign under the headline, "We have to get rid of Trump: Pro-Bernie group launches an effort to boost Biden." Weeks after Biden defeated Trump, RootsAction launched its "No Honeymoon" campaign to challenge Biden to enact a progressive agenda and "to push back against the destructive forces of corporate power, racial injustice, extreme income inequality, environmental assault and the military-industrial complex."

In July 2022, Solomon and Roots Action announced a campaign - Don't Run Joe - to discourage President Joe Biden from running for the presidency in 2024. It launched the campaign in New Hampshire, the first primary state, right after the fall 2022 midterm election, calling on voters to demand bold Democratic leadership. In June 2023, Roots Action transitioned from "Don't Run Joe" to an updated "Step Aside Joe" campaign, still maintaining that President Biden is a risky candidate.

== Bernie Delegates Network ==
Solomon was elected as a pledged Bernie Sanders delegate to the 2016 Democratic National Convention. As a resident of Marin County, he was elected to represent California's 2nd congressional district. He helped to organize, and was the coordinator of, the Bernie Delegates Network independent from the official Sanders campaign organization. Solomon said, "As much as we love Bernie, we don't take orders from him." The network contacted 1,250 Sanders delegates, about two-thirds of the total. Sanders urged his delegates not to boo or engage in disruption on the convention floor. According to Solomon, a survey of the Sanders delegates showed that 28% felt no obligation to comply with Sanders' appeal.

In 2020, when Solomon was elected again as a Bernie Sanders delegate to the Democratic National Convention, he served as a coordinator, among others, to a revived Bernie Delegates Network. The network, co-sponsored by RootsAction, Progressive Democrats of America and Our Revolution, helped mobilize over 1,000 DNC delegates to vote no on the party's 2020 national platform because the platform did not support Medicare for All or a single payer health care system.

== Books ==
- The Blue Road to Trump Hell: How Corporate Democrats Paved the Way for Autocracy (December 2025) ISBN 979-8-9936900-0-1
- War Made Invisible: How America Hides the Human Toll of Its Military Machine (June 2023) ISBN 978-1-62097-791-0
- Made Love, Got War: Close Encounters with America's Warfare State (October 2007) ISBN 978-0-9778253-4-9
- War Made Easy: How Presidents and Pundits Keep Spinning Us to Death (July 2005) ISBN 978-0-471-79001-3
- Target Iraq: What the News Media Didn't Tell You (co-authored with Reese Erlich) (2003) ISBN 978-1-893956-39-1
- The Habits of Highly Deceptive Media: decoding spin and lies in mainstream news (1999) ISBN 978-1-56751-154-3
- Wizards of Media Oz: Behind the Curtain of Mainstream News (co-authored with Jeff Cohen) (1997) ISBN 978-1-56751-119-2
- The Trouble With Dilbert: How Corporate Culture Gets the Last Laugh (1997) ISBN 978-1-56751-132-1
- Through the Media Looking Glass: Decoding Bias and Blather in the News (with Jeff Cohen) (1995) ISBN 978-1-56751-048-5
- False Hope: The Politics of Illusion in the Clinton Era (1994) ISBN 978-1-56751-024-9
- Adventures in Medialand: Behind the News, Beyond the Pundits (with Jeff Cohen) (1993) ISBN 978-1-56751-014-0
- The Power of Babble: The Politician's Dictionary of Buzzwords and Doubletalk for Every Occasion (1992) ISBN 978-0-440-21241-6
- Unreliable Sources: A Guide to Detecting Bias in News Media (co-authored with Martin A. Lee) (1990) ISBN 978-0-8184-0561-7
- Killing Our Own: The Disaster of America's Experience With Atomic Radiation (co-authored with Harvey Wasserman, 1982) ISBN 978-0-440-04567-0

== Film ==
- War Made Easy: How Presidents and Pundits Keep Spinning Us to Death (2007), from the Media Education Foundation, a documentary, narrated by Sean Penn, based on the book.
