= William Rivers Pitt =

American author and essayist (1971–2022)

- Born: November 9, 1971; Washington D.C., U.S.
- Died: September 26, 2022 (aged 50)
- Education: College of the Holy Cross (BA)
- Occupations: Blogger; editor

William Rivers Pitt (November 9, 1971 – September 26, 2022) was an American author, editor, and liberal political activist.

== Background ==
William Rivers Pitt was born in Washington, D.C., on November 9, 1971. His father, Charles Redding Pitt, became chair of the Alabama State Democratic Party. He graduated from the College of the Holy Cross in Worcester, Massachusetts, with a Bachelor of Arts in English literature. He taught English literature, journalism, grammar, and history at a small private school before joining the staff of the non-profit news organization Truthout.

== Writing career ==
Pitt's book War on Iraq: What Team Bush Doesn't Want You to Know, with Scott Ritter, was published by Profile Books in 2002. It was an in-depth examination of the Bush administration's false WMD arguments set against testimony and data from a weapons inspector who oversaw the destruction of Iraq's stockpiles in the 1990s. In reviewing this book, The Guardian called it "the most comprehensive independent analysis of the state of knowledge about Iraq's weapons programmes until the new team of inspectors went back." In December of 2002, the book appeared on the New York Times best-seller list.

Pitt's book The Greatest Sedition Is Silence: Four Years in America," was published by Pluto Press in 2003. It is an analysis of U.S. politics in areas outside the push for war in Iraq, covering topics such as the Enron collapse, the media and Fox News, but primarily concentrates on the aftermath of the attacks of September 11.

Pitt also published Our Flag, Too: The Paradox of Patriotism with Context Books in 2003.

Pitt's book House of Ill Repute: Reflections on War, Lies, and America's Ravaged Reputation, was published by PoliPoint Press in 2006.

Pitt's book The Mass Destruction of Iraq: The Disintegration of a Nation: Why It Is Happening, and Who Is Responsible, was published by Truthout in 2014. The book was co-authored by Truthout reporter Dahr Jamail, who traveled to Iraq after "Shock and Awe" and spent months as an unembedded journalist reporting from Fallujah and other hot spots in the war. Mass Destruction is the last volume of Pitt's trilogy on the war.

== Personal life ==
Pitt died on September 26, 2022.
