= Industrial civilization =

Civilization capable of harnessing energy on a global scale

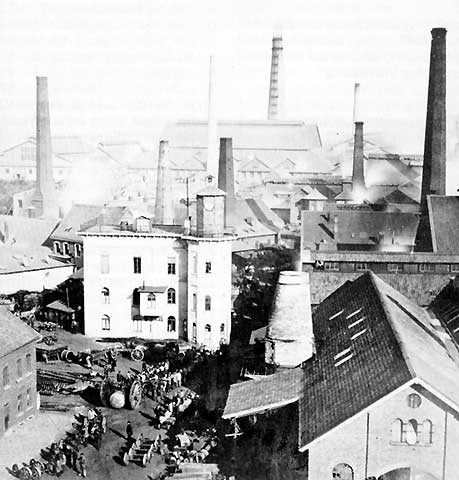
Krupp factories in 1864.

Industrial civilization refers to the state of civilization following the Industrial Revolution, characterised by widespread use of powered machines. The transition of an individual region from pre-industrial society into an industrial society is referred to as the process of industrialisation, which may occur in different regions of the world at different times. Individual regions may specialise further as the civilisation continues to advance, resulting in some regions transitioning to a service economy, or information society, or post-industrial society (these are still dependent on industry, but allow individuals to move out of manufacturing jobs). The present era is sometimes referred to as the Information Age . De-industrialization of a region may occur for a range of reasons.

Industrial civilization has allowed a significant growth both in world population, thanks to mechanised agriculture and advances in modern medicine, and in the standard of living.

Such a civilization is mostly dependent on fossil fuel, with efforts underway to find alternatives for energy production. Some areas have exhibited de-industrialization as certain industries go into decline, or are superseded.

== Contrast with other terms ==
=== Contrast with industrial society ===
Industrial civilization refers to the broader state of civilization, which spans multiple societies; industrial society just to specific segments (within the civilization) dependent on manufacturing jobs, whilst industrial civilisation as a whole involves many regions interdependent (via international trade) specialized in different ways, including information society and service economy. Note that these societies are still dependent on industrial civilization for their goods, and food imports coming from mechanised agriculture.

=== Contrast with Industrial Revolution ===
The Industrial Revolution is the historical event that ushered in industrial civilization. The modern world has evolved further following development in mass production and information technology (allowing service economy, and information society).

=== Contrast with industrialisation ===
Industrialisation is the process of any individual area being transformed. Industrial civilisation as a whole may have regions that still benefit from industrial societies, without being industrialised themselves, or having specialised in other ways (e.g. service economies).
