= CyberPsychos AOD =

Book and magazine publishing venture based in Denver, Colorado

CPAOD
- Website type: Magazine and Book Publisher
- Owner: Jasmine Sailing
- Website: cyberpsychos.netonecom.net
- Commercial: No
- Launched: 1992

Cyber-Psychos AOD (CPAOD) is a book and magazine publishing venture based in Denver, Colorado, focusing on avant-garde and unusual art, culture, and writings. Founded in 1992 (magazine), and 1995 (CPAOD Books) by Jasmine Sailing, it has released 10 books and 10 issues of the magazine. The magazine's unabbreviated title is Cyber-Psychos And Other Diversities, with a subtitle of "The Magazine of Mental Aberrations".

As stated by Ms. Sailing: "Horror, cyber-tech, science fiction, dark fantasy, surrealism, anything pleasantly insane. Please avoid sending straight-forward genre material, I only list these as an example of the general vicinities that might interest me. I have no problem with printing controversial material, in fact I hear it. My main prerogative is that the submission should be intelligent and capable of making people think."

CPAOD was the sponsor of the Death Equinox conventions held in Denver in the late 1990s, also known as Cyber-Psycho Convergences".

== Books published ==
- StarBones Weep the Blood of Angels by Sue Storm
- Nice Little Stories Jam-Packed With Depraved Sex & Violence by Michael Hemmingson
- The Hanging Man by S. Darnbrook Colson
- Stealing My Rules by Don Webb
- Stigma: After World by Jeffrey A. Stadt
- Snuff Flique by Michael Hemmingson
- A Good Cuntboy is Hard to Find by Doug Rice
- The Forbidden Gospels of Man-Cruel Volumes I and II by T. Winter-Damon & Randy Chandler
- A Pound of Ezra by Gregory R. Hyde

== Featured magazines ==
This is a list of featured magazine contents, in issue-number sequence:

- #1 (July 1992): Martin Atkins, Alien Sex Fiend, Joel Haertling, Gordon Klock, Cyber-Cents
- #2 (Samhain 1992): Godflesh, The Electric Hellfire Club, Rhys Fulber, Pamela Z, The Leather Pope
- #3 (February 1993): Crash Worship, Starkland Records, Pigface, Nick Zedd, Edward Lee (interview)
- #4 (May 1993): t. Winter-Damon (issue feature: interview, short fiction, non-fiction essays, art), Lucy Taylor (interview), D. F. Lewis (short fiction), G. X. Jupitter-Larsen, Type O Negative, Edward Lee (short fiction)
- #5 (May 1994): Vampire Rodents, Pain Teens, Joe Christ, Julie Doucet, Bruce Boston
- #6 (February 1995): Brian Hodge (issue feature: interview, short fiction, reviews), Sleep Chamber, Hakim Bey, Uncle River, Adam Parfrey
- #7 (Autumn 1997): John Shirley (issue feature: interview, short fiction), Larry McCaffery, Paul M. Sammon, Carol Lay, Tiamat, Little Fyodor, Charlee Jacob (short fiction), Thomas Wiloch (short fiction)
- #8 (1998–1999): Doug Rice, Lance & Andi Olsen, Michael Moynihan, Mason Jones, Misha, a William S. Burroughs tribute
- #9 (1999–2000): Andrew Vachss (issue feature: interview, short fiction), R. N. Taylor, Don Webb, M. Parfitt, black tape for a blue girl, Arkov Kapacitor, M. Parfitt
- #10 (2001–2002): Lance Olsen, Christopher Bale, Brian C. Clark of Permeable Press, M. Christian, Mason Jones, John Everson

Regular Features (appeared in multiple issues):

- Cyber-Cents (bargain-basement technology)
- Little Fyodor's "A Few of the Interesting Characters I Found Under the Floorboards"
- The Incredible 2-Headed TV Casualty (horror movie commentary from a 2-headed monster)
- Personal Reality Essays
- Comics
- Multi-media reviews

Early issues also featured bonus insert items:

- #1 included a cassette tape of Futura Ultima Erotica songs.
- #2 had The Leather Pope mini-comic as an insert.
- #3 came with a pack of Pain trading cards.

== CPAOD contributors ==
- Bruce Boston
- M. Christian
- John Everson
- Little Fyodor
- Michael Hemmingson
- Brian Hodge
- Charlee Jacob
- Edward Lee
- D. F. Lewis
- Michael Moynihan
- Lance Olsen
- W. H. Pugmire
- Andrew Vachss
- Don Webb
- Thomas Wiloch
- T. Winter-Damon
