= Puck (literary magazine) =

Literary magazine

Puck: The Unofficial Journal of the Irrepressible is a literary magazine that was published by San Francisco-based Permeable Press in the early and mid-1990s.

== History and profile ==
Puck was founded by Brian Charles Clark in 1984. Edited by Clark under the auspices of his imprint, Permeable Press, the magazine published numerous writers in the literary underground, including Hugh Fox, Michael Hemmingson, Lance Olsen, Mark Amerika, Freddie Baer, Susan Birkeland, Eurudice, Adrienne Greenheart, Mary Leary, Doug Rice, Morgan Songi, Tolek, Larry Tomoyasu, Jasmine Sailing and Martin Wayne. In 1997 Permeable Press sold the magazine to Cambrian Publications.

== See also ==
- List of literary magazines
