= Death Equinox =

Death Equinox was a series of four conventions held in Denver, Colorado in the late 1990s and early 2000s. Sponsored by CyberPsychos AOD, and organized by Jasmine Sailing, they focused on alternative culture and art. A usual aspect was that they combined both the transgressive aspects of writing and art with the actual practice of things that would appear in such works. Convention events included standards such as readings and panels but also featured live concerts, play piercing demonstrations, torture readings and Cnidarian sermons. Rev. Ivan Stang hosted a Church of the SubGenius devival at the second Death Equinox convention.

== Death Equinox '97 ==
- General GoH: John Shirley
- Sado-Magickal GoH: Don Webb
- Horrific Literatist GoH: Brian Hodge
- Master of Toast: Edward Bryant

== Death Equinox '98 ==
Specialized Guests of Honour:

- Slack-Magickal GoH: Rev. Ivan Stang
- Master of Toast: Lee Ballentine

Ranchhand Guests of Honour:

- Audial Distortionist GoH: Little Fyodor
- Visual Depictionist GoH: T. Motley
- Veteran Guests: Don Webb, Brian Hodge, and Edward Bryant

== Death Equinox '99 ==
- General GoH: Larry McCaffery
- Master of Oration: R. N. Taylor
- Kink-Artist GoH: Gomez
- Mad Scientist GoH: Bill Llewellin
- Veteran Guests: Brian Hodge, Edward Bryant, Lee Ballentine, Little Fyodor, and T. Motley

== Death Equinox '01 ==
Guests of Honour:

- Avant-Prof GoH: Lance Olsen
- Visual Depictionist GoH: Andi Olsen
- Horrific Literatist GoH: Brian Evenson
- Master of Crack-Toast: Michael Hemmingson
- Veteran Guests: Larry McCaffery, R. N. Taylor, Edward Bryant, Lee Ballentine, Little Fyodor, T. Motley, and Gomez.

== Other known participants (all years) ==
- Jasmine Sailing
- Bruce Young
- M. Christian (Eros Ex Machina)
- Thomas Roche (Noirotica)
- Paula Guran, (Dark Echo/Wet Bones)
- Julia Solis (Spitting Image)
- Greg Bishop (The Excluded Middle)
- Jeffrey A. Stadt (Bloodrealms)
- Doug Rice
- Rob Hardin
- Loren Rhoads (Morbid Curiosity)
- Schwann
- Trace Reddell
- Gregory R. Hyde
- Trey R. Barker
- Christopher Morris*
- Travis Fendle
- Gene Santagada
- Arkoff Kapacitor
- John Kerper
- Claudius Reich
- Judy Saxe
- Darlene Sexauer
- John Niernberger
- Chris Yardley (Tantric Lobotomy Commission)
- Gordon Klock
- Alex Seminara
