= Storming the Reality Studio =

Cyberpunk fiction and essays book

- Front cover of Storming the Reality Studio
- Genre: Book
- Publisher: Duke University Press
- Publication date: 1991
- ISBN: 978-0-8223-1168-3

Storming the Reality Studio: A Casebook of Cyberpunk and Postmodern Science Fiction, edited by Larry McCaffery, was published by Duke University Press in 1991, though most of its contents had been featured in Mississippi Review in 1988.

This collection of fictions by well-known contemporary writers and critical commentary by postmodern theorists addresses issues concerning how cyberpunk functions within postmodern culture. This casebook became the criterion for promoting the interaction between the genre of science fiction and the literary avant-garde.

In his review of the book in Science Fiction Studies, John Fekete writes, "McCaffery likes to read good books; and his role, as in this text, in introducing interesting and off-beat literary artifacts to readers who might otherwise miss them, is to provide a laudable service with an infectious enthusiasm."

Lance Olsen says in his review: "We're talking Zeitgeist here. Nothing more, nothing less. That's what Larry McCaffery's onto in this brilliant new compilation he's edited that you've just got to read.... You can't help getting excited about this collection. You just can't. It does nothing less than assemble a 1990s canon of postmodernity."

== Fiction Writers Featured in Storming the Reality Studio ==
- Kathy Acker
- J. G. Ballard
- William S. Burroughs
- Pat Cadigan
- Samuel R. Delany
- Don DeLillo
- William Gibson
- Harold Jaffe
- Richard Kadrey
- Marc Laidlaw
- Mark Leyner
- Joseph McElroy
- Misha
- Ted Mooney
- Thomas Pynchon
- Rudy Rucker
- Lucius Shepard
- Lewis Shiner
- John Shirley
- Bruce Sterling
- William Vollman

== Non-Fiction writers featured in Storming the Reality Studio ==
- Jean Baudrillard
- Jacques Derrida
- Joan Gordon
- Veronica Hollinger
- Fredric Jameson
- Arthur Kroker and David Cook
- Timothy Leary
- Jean-François Lyotard
- Larry McCaffery
- Brian McHale
- Dave Porush
- Bruce Sterling
- Darko Suvin
- Takayuki Tatsumi
