= Walls of Genius =

Walls of Genius is an American avant-garde music ensemble from Colorado. They participated in the 1980s Cassette Culture and experimented with psychedelic improvisations, free-jazz, punk-rock, uninhibited and manic deconstructions of pop, jazz and country-western standards to musique concrète, industrial noise and sound collages. Walls Of Genius was both reviled and loved by the Cassette Culture. Walls Of Genius was active from 1982-1985 and revived in 2014.

== Release history ==
Walls of Genius released over 30 cassette-albums of their own and others' music in the mid-1980s, starting with 1983's eponymous Walls Of Genius and concluding with a series featuring the collaborative work of Walls Of Genius and the free-jazz improv group, The Miracle, in 1985. They were featured on compilations of the 1980s Cassette Culture scene, including Objekt #2 released by Ladd-Frith Psyclones and "Slave Ant Raid" on Al Margolis' Sound Of Pig label If, Bwana. Walls Of Genius also performed with, produced and released the first two titles of Architects Office, an experimental noise-collage ensemble that later provided soundtracks for some Stan Brakhage films and or tracks.

Live performances included Los Angeles' Anti-Club and San Francisco's People's Theatre Coalition in the Fort Mason Center. Performances in the Denver/Boulder area included the Pearl Street Music Hall, Left Hand Books, the Pirate Gallery, Kake's Studio, the Blue Note, the Littleton Town Hall, and the Brillig.

Walls Of Genius was featured in the Boulder Daily Camera's Friday Magazine, Westword's Backbeat on numerous occasions, including a ten-year retrospective of the Denver music scene and Duane Davis' feature on the Festival Of Pain. They received a mention in Richie Unterberger's 1998 title Unknown Legends Of Rock 'n' Roll ("funny as hell weirdos"). They also merited a feature section in Bob Rob Medina's 2015 title Denvoid And the Cowtown Punks" and Robin James' 1992 title Cassette Mythos. Walls Of Genius titles were reviewed in magazines including Op, Option, Objekt, Sound Choice (see link above), Warning and Unsound.

In 2018, Wall of Genius released Wanted: El Jefe Loco, an album that features 8 tracks and was all written by Evan Cantor.

== Members ==
The primary members of Walls of Genius are the so-called "Head Moron" Evan Cantor (a.k.a. Joe Colorado) and Assistant Morons David Lichtenberg (a.k.a. Little Fyodor) and Ed Fowler. Lichtenberg has performed for many years, with Walls Of Genius and fronting his own band, as Little Fyodor. Collaborators included Marsha Wooley, Dena Zocher, Brad Carton, Leo Goya, Jeanne Hatherly, George Stone, Joe Ketola, Andrea DiNapoli, Melissa Mojica, Timm Lenk, Charles Verrette, and in the 21st century, Hal McGee, Charles Goff III, Rick Layton and Jeff Bragg.

The career of Walls Of Genius was comprehensively detailed by Hal McGee in 2012. A reunion in 2014 produced the release Now Not Then on the Haltapes label. Walls Of Genius remains active and many titles are now available online.

== Reception ==
A review of one release ("Before...and After") stated, "Simply Genius...they have been inspired by contemporary issues and are the new sound terrorists of America". In a later edition of Unsound, Steve Perkins was not as impressed: "This is music made by zealous fans who want to imitate, not by musicians who want to create and be original".

== Other sources ==
- Addison, Anne (1985). Tape And Record Reviews. Unsound Vol. 2, #1, 1985
- Asakawa, Gil (1987). Ten Years After. Westword, 9/16/87
- Davis, Duane (1984). Pain Killers: It's Crying Time Again at the Festival of Pain. Westword, 2/14/87
- Unterberger, Richie (1998). Unknown Legends of Rock 'n' Roll: Psychedelic Unknowns, Mad Geniuses, Punk Pioneers, Lo-fi Mavericks & More. Miller Freeman. ISBN 9780879305345.
- Medina, Robert (2015-08-01). Denvoid and the Cowtown Punks: A Collection of Stories from the 80's Denver Punk Scene. Independent Publisher. ISBN 9781495170454.
- James, Robin (1992). Cassette Mythos. Autonomedia
