= Avant-Pop: Fiction for a Daydream Nation =

Front cover of Avant-Pop: Fiction for a Daydream Nation

Avant-Pop: Fiction for a Daydream Nation is a Fiction Collective Two book published by Black Ice Books in 1992 edited by Larry McCaffery. It is a collection of innovative fiction, graphic art, and various unclassifiable texts written by some of the most radical literary talents who McCaffery classifies as Avantpop. In his introductory chapter, McCaffery calls these writers "a new breed of pop-culture demolition artists". These writers include cult figures such as Kathy Acker, Samuel R. Delany, Harold Jaffe and Derek Pell, as well as young new writers such as Euridice, Mark Leyner, and William T. Vollmann.

== Critical reception ==
Author Tom Robbins called Avant-Pop "a cluster-bomb of crazy fiction from a generation of writers too sane to repeat yesterday's lies." In his 1993 review in Science Fiction Eye, Trace Reddell writes "Here we have a group of writers who have been informed by cyberpunk, postmodern and modern writing, pop culture, and postmodern theory, and they deliver an energetic mix that is anything but redundant." Russ Kirk describes the book as "designed to activate your nervous system directly, bypassing the normal brain centers that are triggered when reading 'normal' material."

== Contents ==
- Larry McCaffery "Tsunami"
- Stephen Wright "Blessed"
- Doug Rice "Of Lightening and Disordered Souls"
- Derek Pell "The Elements of Style"
- Eurudice "Once upon a real woman"
- Mark Leyner "I'm writing about Sally"
- Rob Hardin "When Sleep Comes Down" and "Gunpowder Come"
- Harold Jaffe "Sex Guerrillas"
- Ricardo Cortez Cruz "EbonY MaN"
- Samuel R. Delany "On the Unspeakable"
- Kathy Acker "Politics"
- William T. Vollmann "San Diego, California, U.S.A. (1988)"
- John Bergin "The Water Tower"
- Harry Polkinhorn "Consumimur Igni"
- Gerald Vizenor "Wingo on the Santa Maria"
- Richard Meltzer "Okay with You?" "Days of Beer and Daisies" and "What Is This Thing Called Night?"
- David Matlin "Dreams of a Mind Ruptured Prince and Mouth Play"
- Tim Ferret "Through the Wire"
- Jill St. Jacques "Lady-Boy"
