= Morbid Curiosity (magazine) =

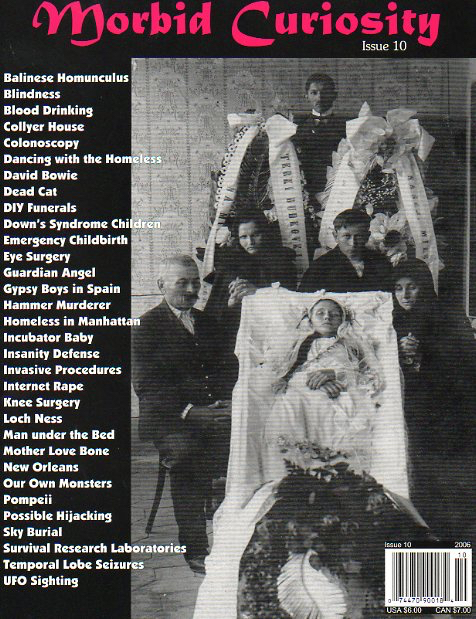
- Issue 10 cover
- Editor: Loren Rhoads
- Categories: Nonfiction, First Person, Creative Nonfiction
- Frequency: Annual
- Publisher: Automatism Press
- Founded: 1997
- Final issue: 2006
- Country: USA
- Based in: San Francisco
- Language: English
- Website: https://lorenrhoads.com/editing/morbid-curiosity-magazine/

Morbid Curiosity was an annual magazine published in San Francisco, California between 1997 and 2006. Helmed by editor and publisher Loren Rhoads, the magazine was devoted to confessional first-person nonfiction essays. Morbid Curiosity explored "the unsavory, unwise, unorthodox, and unusual: all the dark elements that make life truly worth living."

In September 2009, Scribner published a book titled Morbid Curiosity Cures the Blues. The book is a collection of the editor's favorite stories from all ten issues of her magazine.

== History ==
The cult magazine debuted in May 1997, but took some time to settle into a purely first-person vein. Early issues included straight nonfiction, such as the history of auto-erotic strangulation, and interviews. Eventually, editor Rhoads realized that what interested her most were survivor narratives: "There is an undiluted power in reporting what you experienced and testifying about how it changed you. Those are the stories that I like best: the authors' records of When Life Changed. They provide mirrors so that we — voyeurs and survivors in our own rights — can examine our own lives."

Morbid Curiosity magazine collected 310 survivor narratives in its ten issues.

Contributors probed sexuality, birth, modern healthcare, illicit substances, natural disasters, UFO encounters, humanity’s inclinations toward violence, as well as homicide, serial killers, and ghosts. They wandered from Auschwitz to Malaysia and from Hiroshima to Mexico. Through it all, Morbid Curiosity questioned authority, consensus reality, and accepted wisdom. Its tongue was often planted firmly in cheek.

== Contributors ==
Contributors to the magazine included Loren Rhoads, Michael Arnzen, M. Christian, Aaron Cometbus, Ray Garton, T.M. Gray, Michael Hemmingson, Brian Hodge, Charlee Jacob, Brian Keene, Jasmine Sailing, Julia Solis, Jill Tracy, Don Webb, and David Niall Wilson, as well as Maurice Broaddus, Alan M. Clark, John Everson, Rain Graves, Nancy Kilpatrick, and V. Vale.

== Live Events ==
The first Morbid Curiosity Open Mic was held at the Death Equinox '99 convention in Denver. Emceed by editor Rhoads, contributors to the magazine told "improvised true stories about past morbid episodes in their lives." Other Open Mics took place at World Horror Conventions and other horror conventions.

Readings by contributors to Morbid Curiosity magazine took place at Borderlands Bookstore and Borders on Union Square in San Francisco, the Museum of Death (Los Angeles), Stories Books and Cafe (Los Angeles), Dark Delicacies in Burbank, and Elliott Bay Books in Seattle, among other venues. Only the reading hosted by The Thrillpeddlers at the Hypnodrome was recorded.

== Legacy ==
- Morbid Curiosity magazine took part in the Art of Zines exhibit at the San Jose Museum of Art in October 2004.
- It was listed in The Goth Bible by Nancy Kilpatrick and Encyclopedia Gothica by Lisa Ladouceur.
- It was featured in Death: An Oral History by Casey Jarman and Everyone Loves a Good Trainwreck: Why We Can't Look Away by Eric G. Wilson.
- A copy also appeared on Mulder's desk in an episode of The X-Files.
- More recently, a copy of the magazine appeared in Camille Henrot's Pale Fox installation at the Chisenhale Gallery in London in 2014.

== Press and Notices ==
- In 2004, the magazine won the San Francisco Bay Guardian's Best of the Bay Award for "Best Nightmare-Inducing Local Magazine."
- In 2005, Morbid Curiosity was a finalist for the Horror Writers Association's Bram Stoker Award for Best Non-Fiction.
- When Morbid Curiosity ceased production in 2006, The Washington Post featured an obituary.
