= 10:01 =

Novel by Lance Olsen

- Author: Lance Olsen
- Language: English
- Genre: Postmodern novel, Speculative Fiction, Metafiction
- Publisher: Chiasmus Press
- Publication date: January 1, 2005
- Publication place: United States
- Pages: 187
- ISBN: 0970321260

10:01 is a postmodern novel by Lance Olsen, published in 2005 by Chiasmus Press. The book incorporates multiple micro-narratives written in various styles from the point of view of many different characters as they wait for a movie to begin playing in a theater.

A hypertext adaptation of the book was also published in 2005 in the Electronic Literature Organization Collection: Volume One as a collaboration between Olsen and multi-media artist Tim Guthrie.

== Plot and structure ==
Set in AMC movie theater 10 in the iconic Mall of America, 10:01 is composed of multiple micro-narratives written in various styles and genres (surreal, speculative, comic, lyrical, stream-of-consciousness, etc.), each from the point of view of one of the roughly 50 characters waiting for the film (whose title is never mentioned in the text) to begin. Those characters, from an aerobic instructor to a serial killer identifying his next victim, make up something like a cross-section of what Guy Debord called the Society of the Spectacle. As the novel nears its apocalyptic conclusion (which may in fact be happening, or may simply be a description of a movie trailer), contradictory events occur designed to disorient in the same way our data-flooded culture disorients.

In 2005, Olsen collaborated with multi-media artist Tim S. Guthrie to create a hypertext version of 10:01 that was published by the Iowa Review Web and then included in the Electronic Literature Organization Collection: Volume One. Olsen and Guthrie thereby transformed the original text from a primarily temporal to a spatial readerly experience.

== Reception ==
10:01 "attempts to understand how Americans today process the ever more information-rich world around them," Scott Esposito writes in Rain Taxi. "Rather than organizing his book around a discernable plot, Olsen makes an exploration of this idea the book's main attraction, including tiny clues in each vignette. Although some the vignettes are linked and some of the characters are visited more than once, most often we're left to develop our own connections between 'shots.' By structuring 10:01 like a movie and setting the book during a movie screening, Olsen suggests that we make sense of the daily onslaught of mediated, superficial interactions by perceiving consciousness as little movies that run inside our heads."

In a review essay published in Electronic Book Review, Stephen-Paul Martin argues that, "whereas visual media like film, TV, and advertising compel viewers to rush along the surface of a linear sequence of images, Olsen's prose invites careful examination, a gradual, rigorous state of attention designed to produce critical intelligence rather than a commercial transaction. Even if many of the characters are psychologically trapped in one way or another, the multiple space of their juxtaposed and intersecting thoughts and feelings indicates that a crucial aesthetic transformation has taken place, a demonstration of what fiction at its subversive best can offer, a rehumanized model of time."
