= Larry McCaffery =

American author and professor (born 1946)

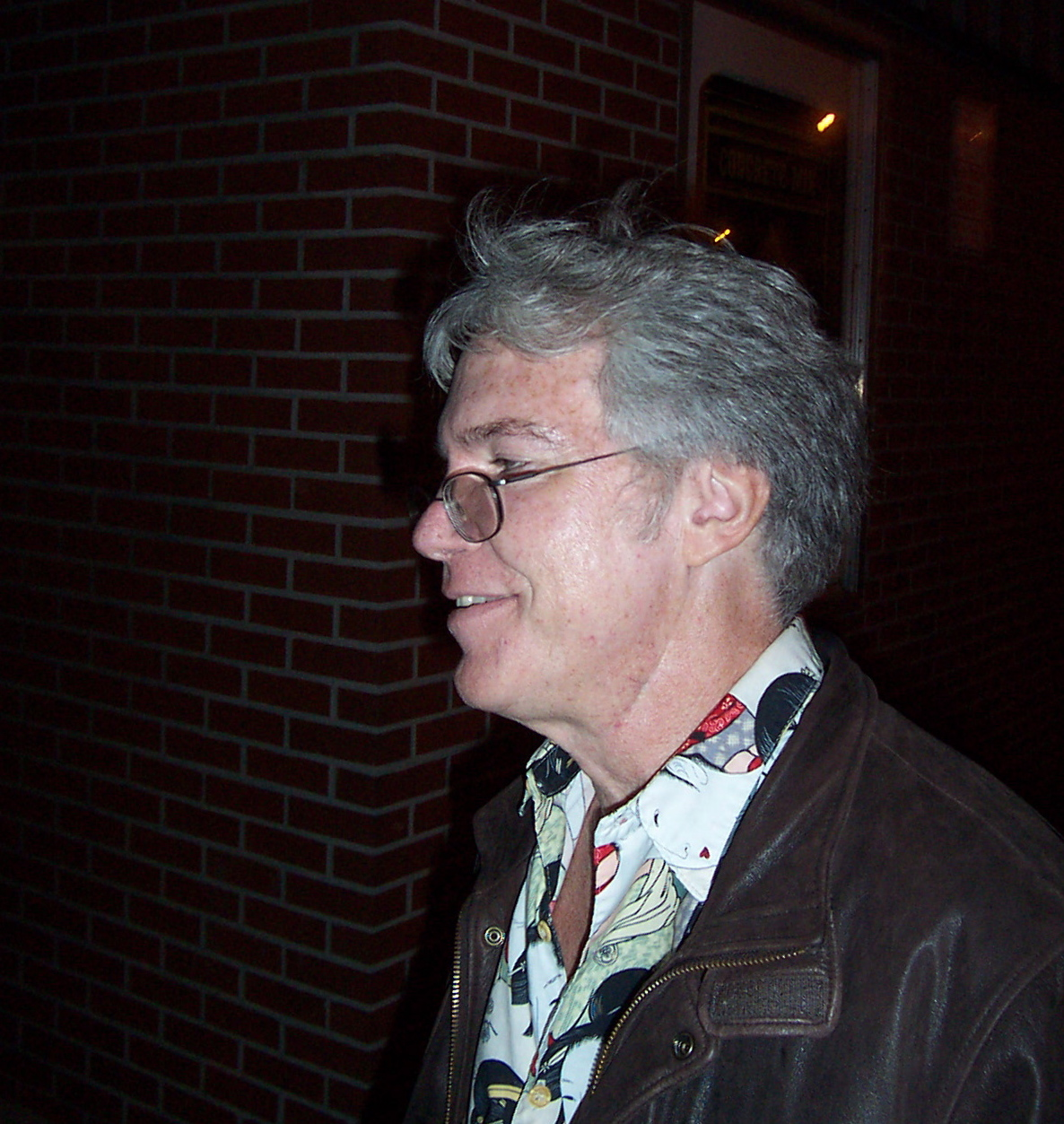
Larry McCaffery.

Lawrence F. McCaffery Jr. (born May 13, 1946) is an American literary critic, editor, and retired professor of English and comparative literature at San Diego State University. His work and teaching focuses on postmodern literature, contemporary fiction, and Bruce Springsteen. He also played a role in helping to establish science fiction as a major literary genre.

== Early life and education ==
McCaffery was born in 1946 in Dallas, Texas. He received his PhD in 1975, with a dissertation on the works of Robert Coover.

== Career ==
=== Academic career ===
He joined the Department of English and Comparative Literature at San Diego State University in 1976. He taught in SDSU's English Department until retiring in 2010. During his career as a professor, McCaffery took up visiting professorships at University of Nice, University of California, San Diego, Deep Springs College (where William T. Vollmann attended), Seikei University in Tokyo, Japan and was a Fulbright Lecturer at Beijing Foreign Studies University during the Tiananmen Square protests of 1989.

=== Literary career ===
In 1983, McCaffery published two books in the field of postmodern literary studies. The first was The Metafictional Muse: The Works of Coover, Gass, and Barthelme, which explored the emergence of the "meta-impulse" as one of the defining features of postmodern aesthetics. The second was Anything Can Happen: Interviews with Contemporary American Novelists (with Tom LeClair), which helped identify the major innovative authors associated with postmodernism.

McCaffery went on to publish three additional collections of interviews with contemporary authors: Alive and Writing: Interviews with American Authors of the 1980s with Sinda Gregory (1986), Across the Wounded Galaxies: Interviews with Contemporary American Science Fiction Authors (1990), and Some Other Frequency: Interviews with Innovative American Authors (1995). McCaffery explains that the interviews within these works begin orally, and, after being transcribed from tape and edited by both McCaffery and the interviewee, become "collaborative texts based on an actual conversation rather than a direct rendering of that conversation". These works established "avant-prof" critic Lance Olsen to dub McCaffery as "Guru of the Interview"

During his career as Professor at SDSU, McCaffery played a large role as editor of literary journals. In 1983, McCaffery arranged to have the literary journal, Fiction International move to SDSU from New York City, where it had been edited and published by Joe David Bellamy since 1973. McCaffery served as co-editor of FI with Harold Jaffe for the next decade, during which it became one of the leading publishers of radically innovative, politically charged fiction. Since the early eighties, he has also been an editor of American Book Review, and executive editor of Critique: Studies in Contemporary Fiction. McCaffery has guest-edited several special issues of other literary magazines, including Mississippi Review's landmark "Cyberpunk Issue".

His work Storming the Reality Studio placed science fiction and cyberpunk within the field of postmodern studies. an anthology featuring the fictional work of authors such as William Gibson, John Shirley, Samuel R. Delany, Don DeLillo, Kathy Acker, and Harold Jaffe, as well as non-fiction by writers such as Jean Baudrillard and Jacques Derrida. Other notable anthologies are Avant-Pop: Fiction for a Daydream Nation (1993) and After Yesterday's Crash: The Avant-Pop Anthology (1997).

== Awards and honors ==
- Judge, Electronic Literature Organization's Fiction Contest, May 2001.
- Guest-of-Honor, Death Equinox Conference, Denver, September 1999.
- Guest-of-Honor, Readercon, Boston, April 1996.
- Pioneer Award from Science Fiction Research Association, 1994.
- National Endowment for the Humanities Research Award, Tokyo, Summer 1992. Title of Project: "Japanese and American Postmodernist Interactions"
- Guest-of-Honor at Volgacon 91: A Conference of Cyberpunk and Recent Soviet Science Fiction, Volgogrand, Russia, September 1991.
- Meritorious Performance and Professional Promise Award, San Diego State University, 1986, 1988, 1990.
- Pushcart Prize Nominee for Non-Fiction
- Selected as Fulbright Lecturer to P.R. China, Beijing Foreign Studies University, 1988–1990.
- Fiction Judge, Los Angeles Times Book Prize, 1986.
- Outstanding Young Men of America Award, 1980.

== References in pop culture and legacy ==
McCaffery is briefly mentioned in Raymond Federman's novel The Twofold Vibration, and is mentioned throughout William T. Vollmann's book Imperial. He has also been quoted in an article in The New Yorker about David Foster Wallace's legacy.

He created a theory of media/visual studies about the relation between memory, narrative, and sexuality called "Avant-Porn," as claimed in his introduction to Michael Hemmingson's 2000 anthology, WTF: The Avant-Porn Anthology. a true account.

McCaffery is also author of the popular best of list The 20th Century’s Greatest Hits: 100 English-Language Books of Fiction. This list was written in response to Modern Library 100 Best Novels list (1999), which McCaffery saw as "being way, way out of touch with the nature and significance of 20th century fiction".

== Selected bibliography ==
=== Books of interviews ===
- Some Other Frequency: Interviews with Innovative American Authors (1995)
- Across the Wounded Galaxies: Interviews with Contemporary American Science Fiction Authors (1990)
- Alive and Writing: Interviews with American Authors of the 1980s with Sinda Gregory (1987)
- Anything Can Happen: Interviews with Contemporary American Novelists with Tom LeClair (1983)

=== Scholarly books ===
- The Metafictional Muse: The Work of Robert Coover, Donald Barthelme and William H. Gass (1982)
- Postmodern Fiction: A Bio-Bibliographical Guide Editor (1985)
- The Vineland Papers: Critical Takes on Pynchon's Novel with co-editors Geoffrey Green and Donald Greiner (1994)
- Federman: From A to X-X-X-X - A Recyclopedic Narrative with co-editors Thomas Hartl, and Doug Rice (1998)
- Avant-Crit: On Contemporary Literature and Culture (2024)

=== Fiction anthologies ===
- After Yesterday's Crash: The Avant-Pop Anthology. NY: Penguin Books, 1997. (ISBN 978-0-14-024085-6)
- Avant-Pop: Fiction for a Daydream Nation. Boulder: Black Ice Books, 1993. (ISBN 978-0-932511-72-0)
- Storming the Reality Studio Durham: Duke University Press, 1991. (ISBN 978-0-8223-1168-3)
- Expelled from Eden: A William T. Vollmann Reader with co-editor Michael Hemmingson (2004)

== See also ==
- List of cyberpunk works
- Avant-pop
- Fiction International
- SDSU Press
