= Desperate Women =

Desperate Women may refer to:

- Desperate Women, 1978 television film, directed by Earl Bellamy, written by Jack B. Sowards
- Desperate Women, collection of stories by Michael Hemmingson

== See also ==
- Desperate Housewives, American television series
