= Head in Flames =

Novel by Lance Olsen

- First edition
- Author: Lance Olsen
- Language: English
- Genre: Postmodern novel, Historiographic metafiction
- Publisher: Chiasmus Press
- Publication date: October 1, 2009
- Publication place: United States
- Pages: 200
- ISBN: 098150275X

Head in Flames is a postmodern novel by Lance Olsen, published by Chiasmus Press in 2009.

== Plot & Structure ==
Head in Flames is a collage novel built on a triadic structure. First Vincent van Gogh speaks briefly (sometimes only a sentence, sometimes a handful) in the first person in a Times font. Next Theo van Gogh does the same in the third person in Times bold. Last Mohammed Bouyeri speaks in the second person in a Courier font. This pattern repeats for the length of the text. The effect is more musical than narrative in a conventional sense.

Van Gogh finds himself standing in a field in Auvers-sur-Oise in July 1890, debating whether or not to commit suicide. Theo finds himself riding to work on the day he was assassinated in Amsterdam in November 2004 by Mohammed, an extremist outraged by the filmmaker's collaboration with controversial politician Ayaan Hirsi Ali on a 10-minute experimental short critiquing Muslim subjugation and abuse of women.

The consequence of such a structure is a complex investigation into art's multiplicity of purpose, religion's increasingly dominant role as engine of politics and extremism in the contemporary world, the complexities involved in foreignness/assimilation, and the limits of cultural tolerance.

== Reception ==
Rain Taxi wrote that Head in Flames is "distinguished both by its inventive, playful form and its evocative content," while Review of Contemporary Fiction called Olsen's novel "an important book" whose "structure is a tour de force of formal innovation calling to mind Pinget's That Voice, Rulfo's Pedro Páramo, and Julio Cortázar's Hopscotch.... Olsen's real success lies not in his critique of the many forms of intolerance but rather in his affirmation of art as salvation."
