= Loren Rhoads =

American author, editor, and lecturer

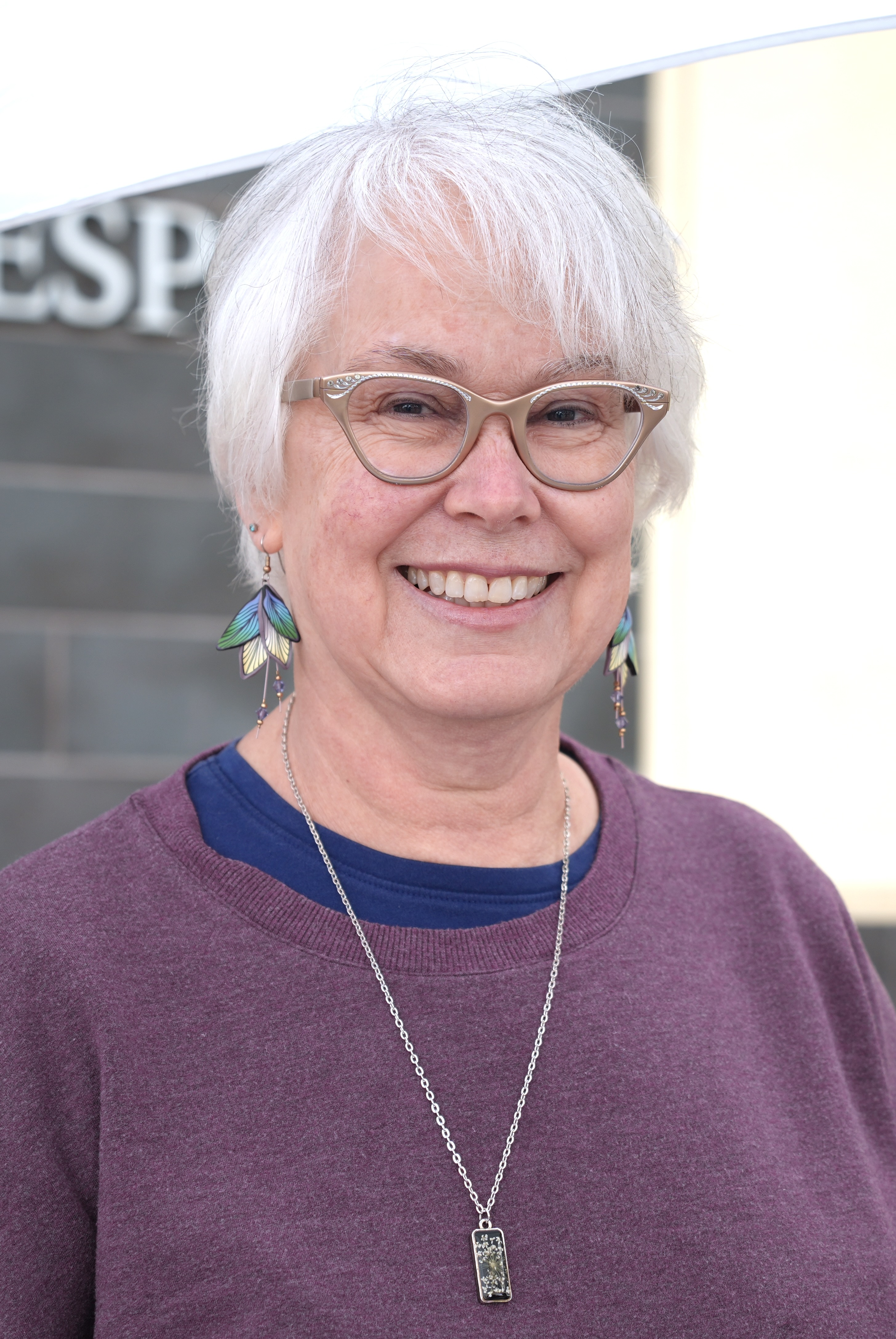
- Rhoads at the 2025 Bay Area Book Festival
- Born: 1963 (age 62–63); Michigan
- Education: University of Michigan
- Occupation: Author

Loren Rhoads (born 1963) is a San Francisco-based author, editor, and lecturer on cemetery history. She is a member of Horror Writers Association, Science Fiction and Fantasy Writers of America, and the Association for Gravestone Studies.

== Biography ==
Inspired by volunteering for RE/Search Publications, Rhoads and her husband Mason Jones founded Automatism Press in 1993. Automatism published two anthologies, Lend the Eye a Terrible Aspect (edited by Jones and Rhoads) and Death's Garden: Relationships with Cemeteries (edited by Rhoads alone), before she created Morbid Curiosity (magazine) in 1997. The magazine, which published true first-person confessional essays, was a Finalist for the Bram Stoker Award in 2004.

In 2006, Rhoads shut down Morbid Curiosity magazine to concentrate on her own writing. Her first big break came when her story "Still Life with Shattered Glass" took third place in the Fiction Contest at the 2005 World Horror Convention and was later published in Cemetery Dance magazine. That led in 2008 to the publication of four of her stories in Sins of the Sirens: 14 Tales of Dark Desire edited by John Everson for Dark Arts Books.

Rhoads edited Morbid Curiosity Cures the Blues: True Tales of the Unsavory, Unwise, Unorthodox, and Unusual, a collection of her favorite essays from Morbid Curiosity magazine, for Scribner in 2009. She subsequently edited anthologies for Damnation Books and Tomes & Coffee Press.

Her first novel, co-written with Brian Thomas, was published by Black Bed Sheet Books in 2014, followed by a space-opera trilogy published by Night Shade Books in 2015.

== Cemetery work ==
In November 1997, Rhoads began writing a monthly column about visiting cemeteries for Gothic.Net. Many of those essays were collected into a cemetery memoir called Wish You Were Here: Adventures in Cemetery Travel, first published by Western Legends Publishing in 2013.

She began blogging at CemeteryTravel.com in February 2011, which led to 199 Cemeteries to See Before You Die, published by Black Dog & Leventhal Publishers in 2017.

Rhoads has written about cemeteries for Mental Floss, Legacy.com, The Daily Beast, The Cemetery Club, Gothic Beauty, the Association for Gravestone Studies, the Horror Writers Association, among others.

She lectured about cemeteries at the Death Salon, Reimagine End of Life, the San Francisco Lit Crawl, StokerCon, the SFWA Nebula Conference, and on NPR.

She continues to advocate for the preservation of historic cemeteries.

== Published works ==
=== Fiction ===
- "Rock Faces," Ladies of Horror Flash Project, October 2019.
- "Silence of the Sirens," Shallow Waters: A Flash Anthology, volume 1, edited by Joe Mynhardt, (Crystal Lake Publishing), June 2019.
- "Still Life with Shattered Glass," Tales for the Camp Fire: A Charity Anthology Benefiting Wildfire Relief (Tomes & Coffee Press), April 2019.

- The raciest version appeared in Sins of the Sirens (Dark Arts Books) in January 2008 under the title "Still Life with Broken Glass."
- The earliest version of the story appeared in Cemetery Dance #54, March 2006, after it took 3rd place in the Fiction Contest at the 2005 World Horror Convention.

- "The Arms Dealer's Daughter," Space & Time #133, March 2019.
- "In the Pines," the Women in Horror issue of Siren's Call magazine, February 2019.
- "Something in the Water," Occult Detective Quarterly #5, January 2019.
- "Elle a Vu un Loup," Weirdbook #40, November 2018.
- "Letter from New Orleans," Ladies of Horror Flash Project, November 2018.
- "Mr. Moonlight," Ladies of Horror Flash Project, October 2018.
- "Guardian of the Golden Gate," Strange California, edited by Jaym Gates and J. Daniel Batt (Falstaff Books/StoryJitsu), April 2017.
- "The Drowning City" reprinted in Best New Horror #27, edited by Stephen Jones (PS Publishing), February 2017.

- Previously published in Nevermore! Tales of Murder, Mystery, and the Macabre, edited by Nancy Kilpatrick and Caro Soles (Edge Science Fiction & Fantasy Publishing), October 2015.

- "The Rush of Wind," Flight: Queer Sci Fi's Third Annual Flash Fiction Contest anthology (Mischief Corner Books), September 2016.
- "The Fatal Book," New Realm magazine, May 2016.
- "Sakura Time," Fright Mare: Women Write Horror (CreateSpace), edited by Billie Sue Mosiman, January 2016.
- "Grandfather Carp's Dream," Out of the Green: Tales from Fairyland (Urban Fey Press), edited by Martha J. Allard and Kacey Vanderkarr, November 2014.
- "Here There Be Monsters," The Haunted Mansion Project: Year Two (Damnation Books), Summer 2013.
- "Never Bargained for You," Demon Lovers: A Succubus and Incubus Anthology, edited by Inara LaVey and Kilt Kilpatrick (Ravenous Romance), January 2013.
- "A Curiosity of Shadows," The Haunted Mansion Project: Year One, edited by E. S. Magill, (Damnation Books), March 2012.
- "Catalyst," Not One of Us #44, October 2010.
- "Valentine" originally podcast by Wily Writers, September 2010.
- "The Angel's Lair," original to Sins of the Sirens: Fourteen Tales of Dark Desire, edited by John Everson, (Dark Arts Books), January 2008.

- It became the first chapter of Lost Angels (Automatism Press), 2016.

- "Sound of Impact," original to Sins of the Sirens: Fourteen Tales of Dark Desire, edited by John Everson, (Dark Arts Books), January 2008.
- "The Fox and the Foreigner," Not One of Us #38, October 2007. The story was long-listed for the British Science Fiction Association Award, January 2008.
- "Affamé," City Slab #10, July 2007.
- "The Shattered Rose," The Paramental Appreciation Society chapbook, originally published by Red Snake Press, an imprint of Borderlands Bookstore, March 2007.
- "Last-Born" initially appeared in The Ghostbreakers: New Horrors, edited by Danielle Naibert and G. W. Thomas (RAGEmachine Books), May 2005.
- "Justice," Blood Rose, April 2003.
- "Fitzgerald's Shadow," originally published in Indigenous Fiction #8, June 2001.
- "Mothflame," originally published in Not One of Us #25, March 2001.
- "The Energizer Bunny at Home," originally published in the Death Equinox '98: Cyber-Psycho Convergence II booklet, October 1998, after it won the Death Equinox '98 Fiction Contest.

- Reprinted in Instant City #4, Winter 2007, as "The Energizer Bunny Keeps Going and Going..."

- "His Love Don't Cost a Thing" (as Lorentz Jones), Unzipped, January 2002.
- "Just Another Day in Paradise," with Mart J. Allard and Brian Thomas, Tales of a New Republic, volume 3: Battles, May 1997.
- "Drifter," with Mart J. Allard, Tales of a New Republic, volume 2: Recruits, May 1996.
- "A Contest of Nerves," with Brian Thomas, Tales of a New Republic, volume 2: Recruits, May 1996.
- "Redemption," Tales of a New Republic, volume 1: Veterans, May 1995.
- "The Acid that Dissolves Images," originally published in Lend the Eye a Terrible Aspect (Automatism Press), March 1994.
- "Jordan Discovers What He Is," From Scratch volume #5, Winter 1992.
- "The Magic of Fire and Dawn," originally published in Beyond Science Fiction and Fantasy #18, October 1990.
- "Part Four: Dr. Chapel," Second Star to the Right: After the Fact (a Star Trek fanzine about Spock's death), October 1986.
- "Claustrophobia," Anthology (a Star Wars fanzine), May 1986.
- "Trust" (as Neil Dauber), in Anthology (a Star Wars fanzine), May 1986.
- "The Martyrs," Sanity, Ltd. #5, Fall 1982.
- "Leather Boots," Sanity, Ltd. #3, December 1981.
- "Alone in the Dark," Summer Youth Program Writers Workshop Bulletin, published at Michigan Technological University, Summer 1980.

=== Chapbooks ===
- Alondra's Experiments, Automatism Press, 2018.
- Alondra's Investigations, Automatism Press, 2018.
- Alondra's Adventures, Automatism Press, 2018.
- Ashes & Rust, Automatism Press, 2005 (paper), 2012 (ebook).

=== Nonfiction ===
- 199 Cemeteries to See Before You Die, Black Dog & Leventhal, 2017.
- Wish You Were Here: Adventures in Cemetery Travel, Automatism Press, 2017.

=== Novels ===
- Angelus Rose: As Above, So Below #2, co-written with Brian Thomas. Automatism Press, 2020.
- Lost Angels: As Above, So Below #1, co-written with Brian Thomas. Initially published by Black Bed Sheet Books in 2014. Second edition, Automatism Press, 2016.
- The Dangerous Type: In the Wake of the Templars #1, Night Shade Books, 2015.
- Kill By Numbers: In the Wake of the Templars #2, Night Shade Books, 2015.
- No More Heroes: In the Wake of the Templars #3, Night Shade Books, 2015.

=== Edited by Loren Rhoads ===
- Tales for the Camp Fire: A Charity Anthology Benefiting Wildfire Relief, Tomes & Coffee Press, 2019.
- The Haunted Mansion Project: Year Two, Damnation Books, 2013.
- Morbid Curiosity Cures the Blues: True Stories of the Unsavory, Unwise, Unorthodox, and Unusual, Scribner, 2009.
- Morbid Curiosity magazine, Automatism Press, 1997-2006.
- Death's Garden: Relationships with Cemeteries, Automatism Press, 1995.
- Lend the Eye a Terrible Aspect, edited with Mason Jones, Automatism Press, 1994.

== See also ==
- List of horror fiction authors
