= Calendar of Regrets =

2010 novel by Lance Olsen

- Author: Lance Olsen
- Language: English
- Genre: Postmodern novel, Historiographic metafiction
- Publisher: FC2
- Publication date: September 6, 2010
- Publication place: United States
- Pages: 456
- ISBN: 1573661570

Calendar of Regrets is a postmodern novel by American writer Lance Olsen, published by Fiction Collective Two in 2010.

== Plot summary ==
Calendar of Regrets is a collage novel comprising twelve interconnected narratives, one for each month of the year, all pertaining to notions of travel—through time, space, narrative, and death.

The narratives involve: 1) the poisoning of the painter Hieronymus Bosch; 2) former CBS anchorman Dan Rather's mysterious mugging on Park Avenue as he strolled home alone one evening; 3) a series of postcard meditations on the idea of travel from a young American journalist visiting Burma; 4) a high school teacher who videos her own auto-erotic asphyxiation and sends them to strangers across the U.S.; 5) a husband-and-wife team of fundamentalist Christian suicide bombers in London; 6) a terrorist commandeering a family's car on the Italian Autostrada; 7) the myth of Iphigenia from Agamemnon’s daughter’s point of view; 8) a series of pirate podcasts by a young drifter along the shores of the Salton Sea in southern California; 9) an interview between forensic psychiatrist Park Dietz and the man who assaulted Dan Rather; 10) an angel (based on the one appearing in symbolist Hugo Simberg's famous painting titled The Wounded Angel) discovered by two boys in the Finnish countryside; 11) a man built of borrowed organs, each with its own story; 12) a boy born as a notebook.

Each narrative is composed in a unique style and genre, breaks off in the middle, and is nested inside the one that preceded it. The twelfth forms the mid-point of the novel. Each interrupted narrative then concludes. Reminiscent of David Mitchell's Cloud Atlas, they form a mosaic, connected through a pattern of musical motifs, transposed scenes, and recurring characters. Calendar of Regrets is a narrative about narrativity itself, the human obsession with telling ourselves and our worlds over and over again in an attempt to stabilize a truth that, as Vladimir Nabokov once said, should only exist within quotation marks.

== Reception ==
Review of Contemporary Fiction wrote "these stories explore the perplexity about ways of knowing and how knowledge is made manifest through storytelling," while Rain Taxi said Olsen's novel "ultimately reminds us of the ways that art and narrative doggedly navigate that thin line between the drive for order and the deep-seated realization that the universe that greets us each morning has only increased its entropy."
