= Tonguing the Zeitgeist =

1994 novel by Lance Olsen

- Author: Lance Olsen
- Language: English
- Genre: Postmodern novel, speculative fiction, science fiction, satire
- Publisher: FC2
- Publication date: May 1994
- Publication place: United States
- Pages: 192
- ISBN: 1882633040

Tonguing the Zeitgeist is an Avantpop novel by Lance Olsen, published in 1994 by Permeable Press. Finalist for the Philip K. Dick Award, it is a work of speculative fiction satirizing the commodification of the arts.

== Plot ==
Set in a post-earthquake Seattle, Tonguing the Zeitgeist is a story about Ben Tendo, a musician wannabe whose day job consists in taking orders at porno supplier Beautiful Mutants, Ltd. When every member of the reigning media-anointed grunge band is mysteriously assassinated, the music industry searches out a new pawn and zeros in on Ben Tendo, who they kidnap, turn into an addict, and implant with a new voicebox to increase the corporation's market shares.

== Reception ==
Book List wrote that "Olsen's densely packed, kaleidoscopic prose paints a nightmare vision of a near future spawned from our worst contemporary fears, such as rampant global warming, environmental decay, and an increasingly sick and cynical media," and concluded Tonguing the Zeitgeist is "brilliant black comedy."
