= John Philip Cohane =

American author

John Philip Cohane, born in New Haven, Connecticut, was an American author. He later moved to Ireland where he wrote books on etymology and ancient astronaut themes.

== Books ==
Cohane published The Indestructible Irish in 1968 in which he proposed that the Irish peoples were of 'Mediterranean origin’. In the book he claimed that the original blood stock in England, Ireland, Scotland, and Wales is Semitic. Cohane also published The Key: A Startling Enquiry into the Riddle of Mans Past, which claimed that before Egyptian, Greek, Phoenician and Carthaginian eras two major worldwide Semitic migrations took place from the Mediterranean and scattered across the earth.

The American linguist Cyrus Herzl Gordon was a friend of Cohane and wrote a preface to Cohane's book The Key, Gordon was supportive of many of Cohane's theories.

Cohane claimed that geographical names in America have a Semitic origin. He also believed that six word roots are found in most place names of most languages. Another claim by Cohane was that the Phoenicians adopted the alphabet from a prior Semitic culture.

In 1977 Cohane published Paradox: The Case for the Extraterrestrial Origin of Man in which he claimed man is a product of interplanetary colonization (see ancient astronauts).

== Reception ==
Cohane's controversial ideas were rejected by professional archaeologists and historians as "fantasy" and "pseudoscience".

Archaeologist Phil C. Weigand described The Key as a "fantasy masked as science" and suggested that the linguistic analysis is "methodologically unsound to be ever seriously considered."

== Bibliography ==
- 1968 The Indestructible Irish
- 1969 The Key: A Startling Enquiry into the Riddle of Mans Past
- 1972 White Papers of an Outraged Conservative
- 1977 Paradox: The Case for the Extraterrestrial Origin of Man

== See also ==
- Tertius Chandler
- Hugh Fox
- Theory of Phoenician discovery of the Americas
