= Derek Pell =

American photographer

Derek Pell is a visual artist, photographer, writer and satirist. He was the editor in chief of Zoom Street Magazine. He was editor of DingBat Magazine for 12 years, and a contributing editor to PC Laptop. Under both his name and his pen names, most notably Norman Conquest. Derek Pell has authored more than 30 books, many of which he designed and illustrated, including the Doktor Bey series, Bewildering Beasties, Assassination Rhapsody, Lost In Translation, and The Little Red Book of Adobe LiveMotion, along with several collections of his work.

== Biography ==
Derek Pell dropped out of the Art Institute of Chicago in the late 1960s and opened The Not Guilty Bookshop & Press on Martha's Vineyard. His writing and art began appearing in publications of experimental literature under various pseudonyms, most notably Doktor Bey and Norman Conquest. His primary style was incorporating mixed-media and using collage-text and cut and paste techniques. After the success of his Doktor Bey series in the late 1970s, Derek Pell moved to Los Angeles in the eighties, during this period he was charged by the FBI for defacing US currency while working on a mail-art performance. He began experimenting with cybertext, hyperlinks, and other computer-aided art in 1991. Pell and Conquest currently reside in the Bay Area where they edit Black Scat Books, a small independent press devoted to "Sublime Art & Literature."

== Themes ==
Derek Pell explores literary modernism/postmodernism themes and styles in his craft. Using a remarkable range of formal discourses and methods, Pell's work often employs elements of intertextuality, metafiction and reflexivity, decenterization, pastiche, appropriation, found materials, and sampling. Through various mediums such as mail art, text-and-collage, gallery exhibits, and book object (Artist's book), his style uses satire, sarcasm, wit, and humor (wordplay, dark humor, absurdist humor, shock humor, visual and textual puns) to comment, criticize, and occasionally openly mock America's traditional cultural attitudes and values though work that is as much conceptual and performance art as it is fiction.

== Pseudonyms ==
Derek Pell has published work under various pseudonyms, some with fictional biographies, which serve to question the concept of authorial originality intention while giving focus and outlet to his different faucets of creative expression.

=== Doktor Bey ===
Bey is a fictional scholar, born in New York City and Tibet in 1877. Author of Doktor Bey's Suicide Guide (1977), Doktor Bey's Bedside Bedbug Book (1978), Doktor Bey's Handbook of Strange Sex (1978), Doktor Bey's Book of Brats (1979), Doktor Bey's Book of the Dead (Jan. 1981).}

=== Norman Conquest ===
This is Derek Pell's visual and performance focused alter-ego and digital artist. Norman's art is featured in texts by authors such as Harold Jaffe's Straight Razor (1995), as well as his own work, Sartre's French Phrase Book (1974); Interiors: A Book of Very Clean Rooms (1985); Extremely Weird Republicans (1994); A Beginner's Guide to Art Deconstruction (1995); The Neglected Works of Norman Conquest (2012); What is Art? (2012); Rear Windows: An Inside Look at Fifty Film Noir Classics (2014); Corn on Macabre & Other Conundrums (2016); Smells Like Teen 'Pataphysics (Jan. 2020)}

In 1989, he founded the international anti-censorship art collective Beuyscouts of Amerika. He has created mixed-media works, book-objects, multiples, and collage works and has been featured in the Spencer Museum of Art. Several of his multiples are part of the permanent collection at the Museum of Modern Art. Conquest is currently Editor & Publisher of Black Scat Books.

=== Che Wax ===
One of Pell's earliest fictional pseudonyms, which appeared on the novel Brother Spencer Goes to Hell published by The Fault (Union City, CA: 1979).

== Books ==
- X-Texts - Collection of iconic sexual and erotic literature, in which each story is a meta-story, or treated version, of the original. Examples include Lady Chatterley's Loafer, Lolita, Over the Hill, and 9 1/2 Weeks: The Long March.
- The Little Red Book of Adobe LiveMotion - Written as an absurdist pastiche of Chairman Mao's Little Red Book, informing the citizens of "correct" political behavior, it also manages to be a guide to Adobe's LiveMotion software. The text serves as a humorous instruction manual for using flash as a political tool to oppose corporate culture and to foster a political revolution against capitalism. Resignifying symbols, images, and texts, the book is an example of the fluidity of meaning and identity found in the World Wide Web. This is the world's first (and only) satirical technical book.

== Photography ==
Pell has been involved with photography since 1974. He writes the Zoom Street blog and is the author of Shoot To Thrill: A Hard-Boiled Guide To Digital Photography (Que: 2009).

His only other nonfiction book is The Little Red Book of Adobe LiveMotion (No Starch / O'Reilly) - a guide to Flash animation. He has worked as a press photographer for UPI, and his photographs have appeared in The New York Times Sunday Magazine, Rolling Stone, LensCulture, The Times, New York, Interview, L.A. Weekly, American Forests, Fiction International, The Village Voice, and Zink.
