= Theories of Forgetting =

2014 Postmodern novel by Lance Olsen

- Author: Lance Olsen
- Language: English
- Genre: Postmodern novel
- Publisher: FC2
- Publication date: February 28, 2014
- Publication place: United States
- Pages: 384
- ISBN: 1573661791

Theories of Forgetting is a postmodern novel by Lance Olsen, published by Fiction Collective Two in 2014.

== Plot and structure ==
Theories of Forgetting is a novel made up of three intersecting narratives. The first involves the story of a middle-aged video artist, Alana, working on a short experimental video about Robert Smithson's land art Spiral Jetty. The second involves the story of Alana’s husband, Hugh, and his slow disappearance throughout Europe and across Jordan on a trip there both to remember and to forget in the aftermath of Alana’s unexpected death. His vanishing is linked to the Sleeping Beauties, a rising global religious cult that worships barbiturates. The third narrative involves the story of their daughter, Aila, an art critic and conceptual artist living in Berlin, and the marginalia she writes in her father's manuscript she discovers after his disappearance.

Each of these narratives has its own unique form and texture. Alana’s takes the shape of a diary containing photographs, drawings, newspaper clippings, and meditations on Smithson’s oeuvre, with which she becomes increasingly obsessed. Hugh’s is a more conventional third-person narrative, its voice numbed, disoriented, in the wake of his wife's unexpected death. Aila's notes exist only in the margins of Hugh's text.

Each page of the novel is divided in half. One narrative runs across the “top” from “front” to “back,” while the other runs “upside down” across the “bottom” of the page from “back” to “front.” In a sense, then, the novel’s physical structure suggests a spiral. Theories of Forgetting doesn't possess a front cover. Rather, it possesses two back ones. Opening it, the reader must choose what constitutes the privileged narrative, the one with which to begin, and that choice will exert pressure on the meaning she or he will make, since there are contradictory elements in the competing plots.

Theories of Forgetting, then, is interested in the materiality of page as well as in such thematic questions as death and the problem of memory and history.

== Reception ==
The Collagist commented that with Theories of Forgetting "Olsen delivers what could be called a 'destructuralized' novel that successfully resists the temptation of a conventional narrative strategy, yet for a novel that so self-consciously flashes its experimental bona fides, Theories remains eminently readable. Innovation and accessibility need not be in opposition to each other." The Quarterly conversation called Olsen's novel "a masterful work."
