= Tertius Chandler =

American historian (1915–2000)

Tertius Chandler (1915–2000) was an American historian and author from Berkeley, California.

== Author ==
Chandler was an author and historian who lectured on history, economics, and religion, especially about Moses. Chandler's most successful book in terms of recognition by scholars is Four Thousand Years of Urban Growth (1987). The book includes estimates of the population of cities since ancient times. Although the book has been widely quoted, urban historians have criticized Chandler's superficial and uncritical use of sources, leading to unreliable population estimates for many past cities.

== Claims ==
Outside of his mainstream work on populations of ancient cities, Chandler held many alternative ideas on history which he discussed in his book Godly Kings and Early Ethics where he presented his ideas on Moses and his belief that Zeus and other figures in Greek mythology were actual people. He developed these claims in some of his other books as well, some of his claims included:

- That Zeus was a king in Moses' time.
- That Tubal of ancient Spain may have built Stonehenge.
- That Moses was Akhenaten's vizier Ramose.
- That Chinese writing was derived from that of Moses.
- That Hindu reincarnation concepts came from Egypt.
- That Noah was the same person as the ancient Greek Aeneas.
- That Adonai has to come from Egyptian Aton.
- That the Jewish Ark comes from the Egyptian Ark of Truth even in its winged decoration.

== Published works ==
- Four Thousand Years of Urban Growth First edition (1974) revised edition (1987) ISBN 0-88946-207-0
- Chandler's Half Encyclopedia
- The Tax We Need
- Remote Kingdoms
- Godly Kings and Early Ethics (1981) ISBN 0-9603872-4-2
- Moses and the Golden Age (1986) ISBN 0-8059-3024-8
- Progress: Social Progress from Mercury to Kennedy

== See also ==
- John Philip Cohane
- Hugh Fox
