= Nietzsche's Kisses =

2006 novel by Lance Olsen

- Author: Lance Olsen
- Language: English
- Genre: Postmodern novel, Historiographic metafiction
- Publisher: FC2
- Publication date: February 28, 2006
- Publication place: United States
- Pages: 244
- ISBN: 1573661279

Nietzsche's Kisses is a postmodern novel by Lance Olsen, published in 2006 by Fiction Collective Two. It is a work of historiographic metafiction.

== Plot ==
Nietzsche's Kisses is the narrative of Friedrich Nietzsche's last mad night on earth. Locked in a small room on the top floor of what would become The Nietzsche Archives in Weimar, one of the most radical and influential of nineteenth-century German philosophers hovers between dream and wakefulness, memory and hallucination, the first person, second, and third, past and present, reliving his brief love affair with feminist Lou Andreas-Salomé, his stormy association with Richard Wagner, and his conflicted relationship with Elisabeth Förster-Nietzsche, his radically anti-Semitic sister.

== Narrative structure ==
The novel is written in narrative triads: a first-person section (comprising the real-time of Nietzsche's last few hours alive), a second-person section (comprising hallucinations experienced by Nietzsche), and a third-person section (comprising Nietzsche's attempt to narrativize his own life; that triadic pattern is repeated throughout the novel.

== Reception ==
In an in-depth critical article, Electronic Book Review called Olsen's novel "quite remarkable," while Publishers Weekly said Olsen is a "fine and daring writer, equal to the material."
