= Jasmine Sailing =

American editor and author

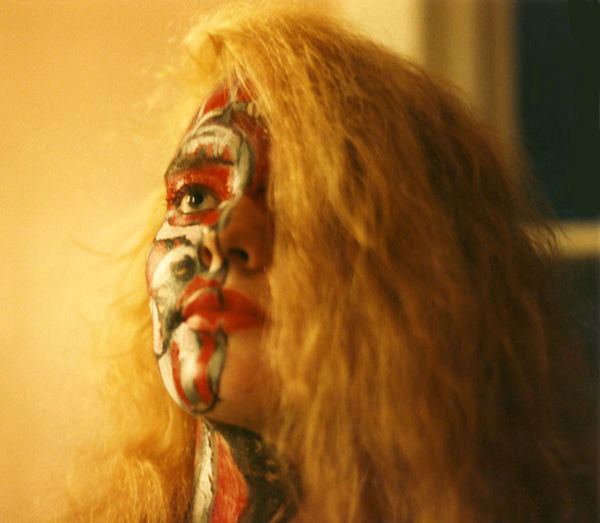
- Sailing in 1991
- Born: 1971 (age 54–55); United States
- Occupations: editor, publisher, event organizer, journalist, short story writer, essayist, gardener.
- Writing career
- Period: 1970s–present
- Subjects: fringe art and culture
- Literary movement: Confessional poetry
- Website: cyberpsychos.netonecom.net/jsailing

Jasmine Sailing is an author, events organizer, performer, music journalist, and editor-publisher of the magazine CyberPsychos AOD. She also organized the Death Equinox conventions in Denver, Colorado, where she resides. She debuted the CPAOD Books book line in 1995.

In the 1990s she performed in multiple music bands (as a synthesist and sometimes vocalist), including Futura Ultima Erotica, Goon Patrol, Ludicrous, and YHVH.

She was raised in the mountains of Colorado.

Sailing has been a guest at Readercon and World Horror Convention.

After running Death Equinox 2001 and publishing various books and another Cyber-Psychos AOD, Sailing put her regular projects on hiatus. She had serious health problems from untreated Graves' disease and Multiple sclerosis. She then recuperated while working on more simple projects. One of them was a Pair Go tournament called Te wo Tsunaide. It was the first Pair Go tournament in the United States outside of the US Go Congress, and during the first year she had support and guidance from Korean professional player and Go book author Janice Kim.

== Publication history ==
The publications in which Sailing's works have appeared include:

- The Mammoth Book of Historical Erotica
- What the Fuck: the Avant-Porn Anthology
- Morbid Curiosity
- Q Zine – Puck
- Mind Rot
- Collective Cauldron
- Bare Bone
- Bloodsongs
- Rebel Yell
