= There's No Place Like Time: A Retrospective =

2016 novel by Lance Olsen

- Author: Lance Olsen
- Language: English
- Genre: Postmodern novel
- Publisher: &Now Books
- Publication date: February 15, 2016
- Publication place: United States
- Pages: 136
- ISBN: 1941423930

There's No Place Like Time: A Retrospective is a limited-edition postmodern novel by Lance Olsen, published by &Now Books in 2016.

== Plot and structure ==
There's No Place Like Time: A Retrospective masquerades as a catalogue for a real retrospective of experimental films by a non-existent videographer. Author Lance Olsen and his wife, videographer Andi Olsen, stage the fake retrospective in galleries in Europe and the U.S. The result is a three-dimensional text: a real place dedicated to an unreal career of an artist named Alana Olsen. From her videos and the texts surrounding them (including this catalogue/novel), the viewer/reader is invited to treat her like a fictional character, inferring her character, development, obsessions, and relationship with her daughter, Aila, who allegedly curates the exhibit, but is in fact another fictive character. The catalogue/novel is made up of critical and biographical essays, stills, and reminiscences about Alana's small body of work (fewer than 20 videos over five decades, some of which have gone missing) produced in relative anonymity, yet apparently a large influence on artists as varied as Lars von Trier, Douglas Gordon, and Martin Arnold.

Thematically, There's No Place Like Time, then, forms part of a larger conceptual art installation that investigates the difficulties inherent in identity and knowledge about the past.
