= La Guerre Est Meurtre =

Studio album by Von Hemmling
- Released: 2002
- Recorded: 1984–2001
- Genre: Experimental
- Length: 69:57
- Label: Shrat Field Recordings & Royal Rhino Flying Records
- Producer: Jim McIntyre

Von Hemmling chronology
La Guerre Est Meurtre (2002)	Wild Hemmling (2005)

La Guerre Est Meurtre is an album by Von Hemmling. Self described by Jim McIntyre as a "linear nonlinear history of Von Hemmling" and a "stream of consciousness", it features a variety of recordings by McIntyre from 1984 to 2001. Broken up into six different "sections", much of the album is noise effects and edited recordings from bands such as The Apples in Stereo and the Lilys.

The album was mixed and mastered between 2001 and 2002. It is currently available on the official Von Hemmling website in six separate .wav files.

== Track listing ==
1. Section One – 12:26
2. Section Two – 9:12
3. Section Three – 8:06
4. Section Four – 6:08
5. Section Five – 12:31
6. Section Six – 21:31
