= Little Fyodor =

American underground punk/garage musician

- Performing in Denver, 2005

Background information
- Born: David Lichtenverg; December 8, 1957 (age 68)
- Origin: Wayne, New Jersey, USA
- Genres: Punk; Garage Rock; Outsider; Experimental
- Instruments: Guitar, vocals
- Years active: 1980–present
- Labels: Discriminate Audio, Public Eyesore, Elephant 6 Recording Co., Small Tools Tradition
- Formerly of: Walls of Genius
- Website: littlefyodor.com

Little Fyodor is the performance name of David Lichtenverg, an underground punk/garage musician from Denver, Colorado, who has been on the independent music scene since the early 1980s. He originally performed in the band Walls of Genius, and then went on to become a solo act as Little Fyodor, and then part of the duo Little Fyodor & Babushka. Lichtenverg is also known as a public radio deejay, and a reviewer of self-published music.

== Biography ==
David Lichtenverg is originally from suburban New Jersey, where during college he was particularly inspired by the Ramones album Leave Home, including the song "Carbona Not Glue". He moved to Colorado in 1981. In the 1980s Lichtenverg was a member of Walls of Genius, a cassette culture experimental group from Colorado which produced 30 tapes from 1982 to 1986, and which consisted of Lichetenverg, Evan Cantor, Ed Fowler and Brad Cartin. Collections of Walls of Genius' 1980s recordings were later reissued on compact disc in the early 2000s. Following the dissolution of Walls of Genius in the mid-1980s, Lichtenverg went on to work on his solo project Little Fyodor, self-releasing his first solo EP, Slither, under the name Little Fyodor in 1985. In 1986 Lichtenverg met Lauren Swain, whom he eventually became involved with romantically and collaborated with musically, with Swain adopting the stage name "Babushka." Lichtenverg and Swain began performing and recording thereafter as the duo Little Fyodor & Babushka, both with and without a live backing band called The Little Fyodor & Babushka Band.

In 1988 Little Fyodor released his sophomore album, Beneath The Uber-Putz, which was followed by Idiots Are Closer To God in 1990. In 1993 he toured with California experimentalists Negativland. Little Fyodor's 1994 album Dance of the Salted Slug was released on the Elephant 6 collective's label, The Elephant 6 Recording Co., and he has since become notable for his association with the Elephant 6, as The Apples in Stereo performed some of their earliest shows opening for Little Fyodor & Babushka. "Let it be known that the very first time the Apples ever performed with a real drum set, they were opening for Little Fyodor and Babushka." The Elephant 6 group Von Hemmling was reportedly named by Little Fyodor.

In 1998 Little Fyodor released a collaborative 7-inch vinyl single with the noise music and "conceptual art troupe," The Haters. In 2000 he collaborated with Boyd Rice on a rendition of the Little Fyodor song "The Blackness," for a compilation of Rice's collaborations with other artists. Little Fyodor later officiated Rice's wedding in 2013. In 2005 the independent Denver record label Discriminate Audio released a 25-song retrospective compilation of Little Fyodor's music, titled The Very Best Of Little Fyodor's Greatest Hits!. In 2013 the independent record label Public Eyesore released a 21-song tribute to Little Fyodor's music, titled The Unscratchable Itch: A Tribute To Little Fyodor, which features covers of Little Fyodor's songs, by various artists. In 2014, Little Fyodor & Babushka performed at the Austin, Texas, film and music festival South By Southwest. They returned for a second South By Southwest performance in 2016.

Little Fyodor is noteworthy for his connection to the Church of The Subgenius. After a live appearance by Little Fyodor & Babushka at the Death Equinox 1997 convention, attendees were so enthusiastic about the performance that they requested having the duo play every year. Little Fyodor became the convention's Audial Terror Guest of Honor in 1998. The Reverend Ivan Stang of the Church of the SubGenius witnessed Little Fyodor & Babushka's 1998 performance and asked them to perform at the next X-Day gathering, – as a result, Little Fyodor & Babushka continued to play SubGenius conventions yearly, into the mid-2000s.

Before moving to Denver, Lichtenverg was a college radio disc jockey, and deejayed a program on WTJU, the student-run station at the University of Virginia. After his move to Colorado, starting in the mid-1980s, Lichtenverg hosted a biweekly radio show as Little Fyodor on Boulder's KGNU, titled "Under the Floorboards," which showcased obscure artists. 2011 marked the 27th anniversary of Little Fyodor's career as a deejay at KGNU. After an initial interview in 1997, Little Fyodor also began a print column based on his radio show, "A Few of the Interesting Characters I've Discovered Under the Floorboards," in Denver-based fringe magazine CyberPsychos AOD.

Although Little Fyodor & Babushka announced their "final" show in 2016, as of June 2025 the group is still periodically performing as The Little Fyodor & Babushka Band.

== Musical Discography ==
=== Full-length albums ===
- Pithy Romantic Ballads - 2019, self released
- Peace is Boring - 2009, Public Eyesore
- Dance Of The Salted Slug -1994, Elephant 6 Recording Co
- Idiots Are Closer To God - 1990, Small Tools Tradition
- Beneath The Uber-Putz - 1988, Small Tools Tradition
- Slither Sloth - 1986, Sound Of Pig

=== Singles and EPs ===
- I Hate Myself (or What the Benadryl Gave Me) - 2025, NO PART OF IT
- Truly Rejected (as Little Fyodor & Babushka) - 2015, self released
- Revolution 9 - 2000, Small Tools Tradition
- The Age of Resignation / Shut Up! You're Not Funny! - 1990, self released
- Little Fyodor And The Haters - 1998, Noisopoly
- Slither - 1985, Mac Leningrad Music

=== Live albums ===
- Live @ XX-Day (as Little Fyodor & Babushka) - 2004, self released
- KGNU Kabaret 11/18/89 (as Little Fyodor & Babushka) - 1990, Harsh Reality Music

=== Appearances and Contributions ===
- Airs of Contempt and Derision - 2023, Discriminate Audio
- No Electricity - 2023, Forever Escaping Boredom
- Modus Vivendi - 2021, NO PART OF IT
- Hard to Be a Killer: A Tribute to Ralph Gean (as Little Fyodor & Babushka) - 2020, Hypnotic Turtle Records
- Pandemic Response Division (with GX Jupitter-Larsen, Michael Esposito, and Zo Guthrie) - 2020, Spectral Electric
- High Risk Of Rainbows & Hair Ribbons (I Got The Corona Virus - 19 Blues) - 2020, Harsh Reality Music
- Friends Of Stilletid 2018 Compilation (as Little Fyodor & Babushka) - 2018, Stilletid
- Friends Of Stilletid 2017 Compilation (as Little Fyodor & The Insect Explosion) - 2017, Stilletid
- Delirious Music For Delirious People - 2011, NO PART OF IT
- Reclamation Now! - A Tribute to deadbubbles (as Little Fyodor & Babushka) - 2011, Hypnotic Turtle Records
- Trunculence - 2008, NO PART OF IT
- Denver Art Rock Collective Vol. 1 - 2007
- Babushka's Naughty XXXmas! (as Little Fyodor & The Inactivists) - 2005, self released
- Radio 1190 Local Shakedown Vol. II - 2004, Smooch Records
- The Way I Feel (with Boyd Rice & Winona Righteous) - 2000, Caciocavallo
- 1-800-America - 1994, RRRecords
- Auricular Monthly Audio Magazine No. 9 - 1992, Auricular Monthly Audio Magazine
- The Electronic Cottage International Compilation Cassette Series: Volume 3 - 1991, Electronic Cottage
- Colorado Cassette Culture Compilation - 1990, Sound Of Pig
- Kakophonia Compilation #2 - late 1980s, Pillar Of Plastic
- collect and COLLOID - 1988, Small Tools Tradition
- Colorado - 1988, RRRecords
- Music From The Dead Zone Two: USA - 1987, Dead Man's Curve
- No Pigeonholes Volume 156 - 1987, Lonely Whistle Music

=== Compilation Albums ===
- The Very Best Of Little Fyodor's Greatest Hits! - 2005, Discriminate Audio

=== Tribute Collections ===
- The Unscratchable Itch: A Tribute To Little Fyodor - 2013, Public Eyesore

=== David Lichtenverg albums with Walls of Genius ===
- Madness Lives: The Walls Of Genius Compilation - 1985/2005, Walls of Genius Records
- Raw Sewage, VOL. II - 1985/2004, Walls of Genius Records
- Before... and After - 1984/2004, Walls of Genius Records
- Ludovico Treatment - Music To Cure Your Ills - 1984/2003, Walls of Genius Records
- Crazed To The Core - 1984/2001, Walls of Genius Records
- Raw Sewage, VOL. I - 1383/2002, Walls of Genius Records

== Music Videos ==
- "Trump Loves You" (as Little Fyodor & Babushka) - 2019, directed by Jason Bosch
- "No Relief In Sight" - 2012, directed by Matt Whoolery
- "Dance of the Salted Slug" - 2010, self released
- "I Want An Ugly Girl" (as Little Fyodor & Babushka) - late 1980s, self released

== Radio Broadcasts ==
- And This One's Introduced By... - December 14, 2022
- WTBC Radio - April 18, 2018
- Dave's Gone By - November 25, 2017
- Radio 1190, KVCU-AM - 2013
- Outsight Radio Hours #719 - September 15, 2013
- Radio 1190, KVCU-AM - 2015
- The Dr. Demento Show #97-46 - November 16, 1997
- The Dr. Demento Show #86-14 - April 6, 1986

== Television and Online Video Appearances ==
- The Hypnotic Turtle DreamBox, March 1, 2025
- Apartment Music 48, January 20, 2024
- Talking Palettes - June 15, 2020
- HPTV!, September 1, 2016
- Met TV, March 22, 2016
- TheLipTV2, "Late Night Denver" - September 19, 2013
- Home Movies Colorado, August 5, 2008
- Setlist TV - 1 hour Staten Island Cable TV special featuring Little Fyodor and Babushka - January 2011
