= Tim Guthrie =

American painter

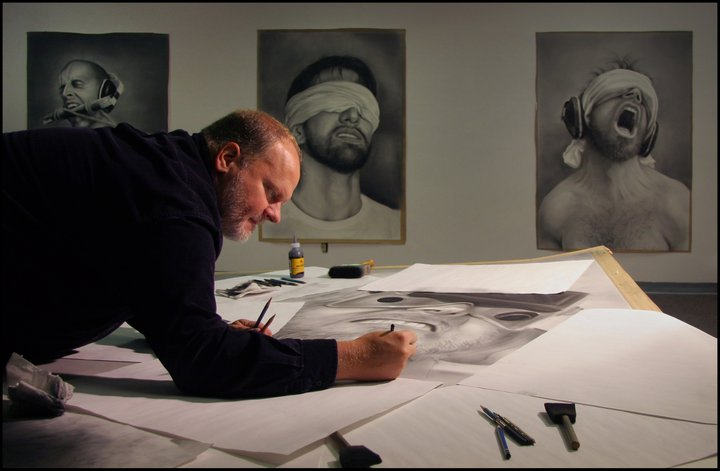
- Tim Guthrie drawing in his studio. Photo by Lindsey Bierman
- Born: Timothy Sean Guthrie; 1965 (age 60–61); Omaha, Nebraska, U.S.
- Known for: Experimental film

Timothy Sean Guthrie (born 1965 in Omaha, Nebraska) is a visual artist and experimental filmmaker. Guthrie's work is in collections throughout the United States, including the Boise Art Museum, and the Paris Gibson Square Museum of Art, Plemmons Collection of Contemporary Art, (Boone, North Carolina), and the Leigh Lane Edwards Collection of Contemporary Art, (Appalachian State University). Tim Guthrie gave a TEDxOmaha talk in October 2018 about An Artist's Journey Through Love and Loss. The talk focused on the death of his wife in 2015, and his grieving process, as well as the mini-documentary he created about her, called Missing Piece, which won numerous national and International awards. The works were also featured on the cover and in an article of Omaha Magazine.

He won a Top 25 MFA Sculptors in the Nation award from the International Sculpture Center and Sculpture Magazine, and worked on the Lied Jungle at Omaha's Henry Doorly Zoo, and he references both in a Creative Mornings talk where, among many projects, he also discusses working on the Lost City in Africa.

== Collaborations ==
Guthrie collaborated with Lance Olsen, a finalist for the Philip K. Dick Award for his novel Tonguing the Zeitgeist (Permeable Press,1994) on an interactive hypertext novel called 10:01, which was also published in the Electronic Literature Directory (Electronic Literature Organization) and The Iowa Review - Web Edition. Guthrie also collaborated with Olsen on an experimental animation called "The Nature of the Creative Process", which was featured at &Now.

Guthrie also has directed awarding winning films with Creighton University professors and students Backpack Journalism Project

== Residencies and exhibitions ==
Guthrie has been an artist-in-residence places such as Ørslev Kloster (Denmark), The Tyrone Guthrie Centre (Ireland), New Pacific Studio (New Zealand), and the Blue Mountain Center, (Blue Mountain, NY) and The Vermont Studio Center. He has also been awarded fellowships and grants (Nevada Arts Council, Sierra Arts Foundation, Nebraska Arts Council, each funded by the National Endowment for the Arts). Other awards include a purchase award at the Paris Gibson Square Museum of Art and awards at "Conflicts: The Cult of War and the Culture of Peace - AniMOweb", Modena, Italy, for the short film “Recalling Trinity" (IMDb), which was also included in the Hiroshima International Animation Festival, the Fort Omaha Film Conference, Film Streams and the Sheldon Museum of Art. His work has been shown in many venues, including the Holter Museum of Art, Bellevue Arts Museum, St. George Art Museum, and the Nevada Museum of Art and the Bemis Center for Contemporary Arts for a complex installation called "Rendition" which was originally shown in Reno, NV, and in which visitors had their reactions to his paintings of prisoners being tortured "digitally downloaded into a database for future examination and analysis".

== Books ==
Guthrie's work was included in the book Ingres, regards croisés by Jean-Pierre Cuzin and Dimitri Salmon. Guthrie's photography was used in Ink, Davis Schneiderman's third book in his DEAD/BOOKS trilogy.

== Awards ==
Guthrie was Best Visual Artist, Best New Media Artist and was awarded Best Group Show (Museum of Alternative History) in 2014. He was also Best New Media Artist in 2007 and was awarded Best Group Show (Nuclear Dichotomies) the same year. He has also been awarded Individual Artist Fellowships (Nebraska Arts Council) in 2011, 2008, 2007 and 2006 (Distinguished Artist).

Guthrie is a professor at Creighton University.

== Artwork ==
Guthrie has used his work to make commentaries about social justice such as his The Museum of Alternative History project, which addresses cognitive dissonance and confirmation bias and a 2007 show about the USA's nuclear testing program called Nuclear Dichotomies. He has presented his work as an activist at presentation around the world, such as Digital Disobediences where he was featured as part of Abertay University's Platform series. His Big Art Giveaway gave away nearly 500 pieces of artwork during the year of 2012 to "the 99%" including a show of much of the work at the Modern Arts Midtown Gallery in Omaha, NE. In 2010, Guthrie collaborated with Doug Hayko to create an exhibition about the United States' extraordinary rendition program at the Bemis Center for Contemporary Arts.

== Installations ==
Guthrie's work has included site specific installations, such as the Elements installation "Burn" at Fontenelle Forest in Bellevue, NE, and "Flow" in Elkhorn, NE and outdoor video projections such as the one for "Science Fair" in Omaha, NE.

Guthrie has also done public art pieces, including murals and banners on silos.

== Education ==
- Creighton University (Bachelor of Fine Arts Painting/Drawing)
- University of Idaho (Master of Fine Arts Sculpture)

== Residencies ==
- Blue Mountain Center, Blue Mountain, New York
- Tyrone Guthrie Centre, Annaghmakerrig, Ireland
- New Pacific Studio, New Zealand
- Hall Farm Center for the Arts and Education, Townshend, VT
- Virginia Center for the Creative Arts, VA
- Ørslev Kloster, Højslev, Denmark
- Vermont Studio Center, Johnson, VT

Collections

- Boise Art Museum, Boise, Idaho
- Paris Gibson Square Museum of Art, Great Falls, Montana
- Plemmons Collection of Contemporary Art, Boone, North Carolina
- Leigh Lane Edwards Collection of Contemporary Art, Appalachian State University
