= The Bachelor Machine =

Collection of erotic science fiction short stories

First edition, cover art by Larry Utley

The Bachelor Machine is a collection of erotic science fiction short stories by M. Christian. It was first published in 2003 (ISBN 1-931160-16-3) by Green Candy Press; the book is introduced by Cecilia Tan. It was republished in 2010 by Circlet Press (ISBN 978-1-885865-58-8) with a new foreword by Kit O'Connell. The stories take place in a wide variety of settings, with an assortment of themes and widely differing tone, from grim to humorous. There is also a wide variety of sexual acts depicted in the work, including many which are not possible with modern technology, involving a wide variety of partners in heterosexual, bisexual, homosexual and sometimes non-human couplings.

== Plot summaries ==
Some of the short stories in this collection include,

- "State", about a prostitute who is trained to behave like an expensive robot designed for sex.
- "Bluebelle" is about a police officer and his police vehicle (for which the story is named). His vehicle is also his sex partner.
- In "Winged Memory," a prostitute wears "whoreware," wearable computing equipment which includes a bracelet that charges cash cards and eyewear that cycles from green to red when a client's time is up. A man sells his memories (not unlike Strange Days)) in exchange for money to hire the prostitute.
- "Eulogy" is set in a future where humans are effectively immortal. In the story, a woman wants to perform oral sex on a man with a rare illness which is still actually fatal because the participants are bored with eternal life and miss their deceased friend.
- "Butterflie$" is the story of a computer hack which drains a victim's bank account while seducing them in virtual reality.
- "Everything But the Smell of Lilies," which concerns Justine, an expensive prostitute who has been surgically altered: thanks to extensive implants and modifications (such as rerouting of arteries and internal oxygen tanks), she can have her throat slit by a client who can then fulfill necrophilic fantasies on a body that can wake up again, save them from criminal charges, and collect a hefty fee. In this story, her pimp asks her to stage a distraction from a crime and act as a real victim, placing her in the hands of a paramedic with a taste for actual corpses.
- Lines of sexual orientation are blurred in "Fully Accessorized, Baby," where two women have sex, both using fully functional prosthetic penises (one also has a cybernetic arm made of teak).
- "The New Motor" is erotic historical fiction about the spiritualist John Murray Spear and a mystical machine he is led to build.
- "Guernica" depicts the behavior of BDSM enthusiasts in a dystopian future where only procreative heterosexual sex is legal.
- "Hackwork" is about a future where a high-tech form of possession allows a woman to hire her body out for sexual pleasure to clients that will feel her every sensation remotely.
- "Heartbreaker" is about a cyborg police woman who has a sexual encounter with an equally artificial criminal.
- In "Switch", a woman is a prostitute for a sex club where the prostitutes' memories are erased at the end of each working day, allowing them to cater to extremely private clientele.
- "Intercore" is about a futuristic amateur pornography photography session.
- An example of the humor in the volume occurs in "Technophile," which opens with the line, "I almost lost my virginity at fifteen, but his batteries ran low." It is about a young man whose attempts at his first sexual encounter with another man is made more awkward when he discovers that his lover's cybernetic genitalia is incompatible with the wiring in his home.
- "Skin-Effect" concerns two android lovers, one of whom is a soldier that has been completely replaced by artificial, robotic parts.

^{[2]}^{[3]}

== See also ==
- Sex in science fiction
- The Bride Stripped Bare By Her Bachelors, Even (Marcel Duchamp)
