= T. Winter-Damon =

American poet

- Born: Timothy Winter Damon
- Died: 2008; Tucson, Arizona
- Occupations: Novelist; short fiction author; essayist; poet; artist
- Writing career
- Pen name: t. Winter-Damon
- Genres: horror, crime, science fiction, occult
- Notable works: Duet For the Devil, City in the Torrid Waste

T. Winter-Damon was the pseudonym of Timothy Winter Damon, an American writer of fiction, poetry, and non-fiction, as well as an artist. His work has appeared in anthologies and in hundreds of international magazines. Among other distinctions, T. Winter-Damon's short fiction was regularly selected to be reprinted in The Year's Best Horror Stories, an annual anthology published by DAW Books.

His non-fiction specialties included world mythologies, Meso-American mythologies and ritual, serial murder, sexual sadism, cannibalism, and the occult, published in multiple issues.

He noted Marquis de Sade, Charles Baudelaire, William S. Burroughs, Edgar Allan Poe, H.P. Lovecraft, and Harlan Ellison as literary influences.

== Selected bibliography ==
=== Books ===
- Duet for the Devil CreateSpace Independent Publishing Platform (December 3, 2010) ISBN 978-1456437930
- The Hour of Hallucinations (poetry collection) (Talisman Books, 2002) ISBN 0-9626708-3-9
- The Forbidden Gospels of Man-Cruel, Volume 1 (with Randy Chandler) (CyberPsychos AOD Books, 2001) ISBN 1-886988-09-9
- The Forbidden Gospels of Man-Cruel, Volume 2 (with Randy Chandler) (CyberPsychos AOD Books, 2001) ISBN 1-886988-10-2
- Duet For the Devil (with Randy Chandler) (Necro Press, 2000) ISBN 1-889186-53-8
- Rex Miller: The Complete Revelations (TAL Publications, 1993)

=== Books: cover art ===
- Stigma: Afterworld (CyberPsychos AOD Books, 1997)
- Sinistre: An Anthology of Rituals (Horror's Head Press, 1993)
- The Best of D. F. Lewis (TAL Publications, 1993)
- Short Circuits / Bad News from the Stars (Ocean View Books, 1991)
- Hypertales & Metafiction by Bruce Boston (Chris Drumm Books, 1990)

=== Short fiction ===
- Do Deadheads Dream of Shock-Pulsed Meat? (Fantastic Worlds v1 #1 1996)
- Kadath: the Vision and the Journey (Cthulhu's Heirs, Chaosium 1994)
- Chaunt of the Gray Man (Worlds of Fantasy & Horror, Sum 1994)
- A Conversation with Harry Fassl (The Silver Web, Spr/Sum 1994)
- Magnetic Personality Triggers Nail-Biter's Near-Death Ordeal! (Alien Pregnant By Elvis, DAW Books, 1994)
- City in the Torrid Waste (The Year's Best Horror Stories: XXI ed, 1993)
- Shadowings (Weird Tales, 1992)
- The Ghost of Rimbaud Pauses (Grue #13 1991)
- Fragments as the Darkened Mirror Shatters (The Tome #4, 1990)
- Lord of Infinite Diversions (Semiotext(e) SF, Autonomedia, 1989; The Year's Best Horror Stories XVIII, DAW Books, 1990)
- In the Haunted Lands of Fear (Haunts #17, 1989)
- London is Calling with Don Webb (Back Brain Recluse, 1989; Don Webb's The Explanation and Other Good Advice collection, Wordcraft of Oregon, 1998)
- Martyr Without Canon (Grue, 1987; The Year's Best Horror Stories: XVI, DAW Books, 1988)

=== Poetry ===
- To a Fig Tree (Xizquil, 1993; 1994 Rhysling Anthology, Science Fiction Poetry Association)
- Holocaustic Museum Fragments for Binary Extrapolation with Bruce Boston (Specula, 1993; 1994 Rhysling Anthology Science Fiction Poetry Association; Works, 1995)
- The Newcomer with Thomas Wiloch (Xanadu 2, Tor Books, 1994)
- He Whispers the Secrets of Those Souls Blind of Morning’s Blue (Nocturne #1, 1988; 1989 Rhysling Anthology Science Fiction Poetry Association)
- Flickering Blue Extreme (Back Brain Recluse #4; 1986 Rhysling Anthology Science Fiction Poetry Association)
