= Von Hemmling (album) =

Studio album by Von Hemmling
- Released: 1993
- Genre: Experimental
- Length: 34:46
- Label: The Elephant 6 Recording Company

Von Hemmling chronology
| Von Hemmling (1993) | My Country Tis Of Thee / A Fine Appleseed (1997) |

Von Hemmling is an album by Von Hemmling. It was released by The Elephant 6 Recording Company.

== Track listing ==
1. Happy Were Together – 1:30
2. Little Arabian Rurul – 1:19
3. Get It – 1:22
4. Tell Me Sweetie – 2:33
5. Me Thin – 1:00
6. Copper Kettle – 1:46
7. Drive Yr. Dad Insane - 1:30
8. Oh Jennifer - 1:59
9. Nannys B-Day III - 1:25
10. Kathouse - 2:02
11. Stripes & Buttons - 1:08
12. Cupcake Cake - 0:51
13. Lulu - 2:09
14. Cant Take The Rain - 1:44
15. Never Alone - 1:36
16. Turn Up The Heat - 1:40
17. Fall Open Eye Mockingbird - 0:40
18. Flairfies - 0:51
19. Beenus-Bonus - 0:59
20. Popper - Take - 2:28
21. Rainy - 1:46
22. Good For Girl - 1:14
23. Hon Denlle Don Hemml - 0:47
