= Anxious Pleasures =

2007 novel by Lance Olsen

Anxious Pleasures: A Novel After Kafka
- Author: Lance Olsen
- Language: English
- Genre: Postmodern novel, Metafiction
- Publisher: Shoemaker & Hoard
- Publication date: February 1, 2007
- Publication place: United States
- Pages: 176
- ISBN: 159376135X

Anxious Pleasures: A Novel After Kafka is a postmodern novel by Lance Olsen, published in 2007 by Shoemaker & Hoard (now Counterpoint). It is a work of metafiction.

== Plot and structure ==
Anxious Pleasures explores intertextuality by appropriating and rewriting Franz Kafka's 1915 novella The Metamorphosis, about a man named Gregor Samsa who wakes up one morning to find himself transformed into a giant insect, from the points-of-view of the until-now secondary characters. Interspersed sections relate the narrative of Margaret, a young woman reading Kafka's text for the first time (a text that, strangely, seems to evince facts contrary to those in the original), and that of a downstairs neighbor, who may be some version of Kafka himself.

== Reception ==
Calling the novel "intricately woven and richly imagined", Publishers Weekly's review concludes that Anxious Pleasures "is a cerebral treat unto itself and a fine companion to Kafka's original."

In an extended review essay written for the journal Hyperion, Timothy Attanucci argues that Anxious Pleasures "unfolds under the aegis of the imperative that all history is what historians like to call revisionist. The coherence of any memory, any vision of the past, depends on the erasure of all that does not confirm the current interpretation. This is as true for history as it is for personal recollection: forgetting is ineluctable. From another perspective, however, one might begin to see how remembering the past is also a form of forgetting the present. At least this is the wager of a historical reading. One no longer reads Kafka insofar as he exists for us, reinventing him as necessary. One reads Kafka in order to see our world through his eyes, as if he could reinvent our present. In order to achieve this, one must confront historical reality as best one can. In part, this means revising tired narratives, or as Olsen writes, 'short-circuiting the comfortable narratives produced by dominant cultures committed to seeing such stories told and retold until they begin to pass for something like truths about aesthetics and the human condition' (125). In part, it means revisiting those narratives that never have become comfortable, and facing their strangeness as directly as possible. If you feel reassured by Kafka, then maybe Lance Olsen can provide you with a new jolt of curiosity."
