= Von Hemmling =

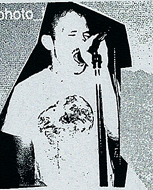
- Photo from show flyer, 2004.

Background information
- Origin: Denver, Colorado
- Genres: Experimental, lo-fi, psychedelic, garage rock
- Years active: 1991–present
- Labels: Elephant 6 Shrat Field Recordings; Royal Rhino Flying Records; The Fox Pop Recording Co
- Spinoffs: The Apples In Stereo
- Members: Jim McIntyre
- Past members: Hilarie Sidney; John Hill; John Ferguson
- Website: www.vonhemmling.net

Von Hemmling is the solo project of Jim McIntyre and one of many experimental music projects associated with The Elephant 6 Recording Company. Though Jim McIntyre is the band's primary performer, Hilarie Sidney and John Hill have both been members of Von Hemmling before becoming members of The Apples in Stereo. Other frequent collaborators include Rich Sandoval, Rob Greene, Dane Terry, Mike Snowden, John Ferguson, Trevor Tremaine and Mike Buckley. Von Hemmling was named by Denver artist Little Fyodor, in a conversation where Don Henley was mistakenly heard as "Von Hemmling"

== Discography ==
| Album | Release date | Label | Format |
|---|---|---|---|
| Von Hemmling | 1993 | Elephant 6 (E6011) | Cassette |
| My Country Tis Of Thee / A Fine Appleseed | 1997 | Elephant 6 | 7" vinyl |
| J.W. Kellogg | 1999 | Shrat Field Recordings (SHRAT 8801), Elephant 6 | 12" vinyl (one side only) |
| 99 from 1999 | 2000 | self-released | CD-R |
| La Guerre Est Meurtre | 2002 | Shrat Field Recordings | CD |
| Wild Hemmling | 2005 | self-released | CD |
| 99 from 1999 | 2008 | Royal Rhino Flying Records | CD |
| La Guerre Est Meurtre | 2008 | Royal Rhino Flying Records | CD |
| You (Being My Body Whole) | 2008 | The Fox Pop Recording Co. | Cassette |
