= Architectures of Possibility =

Architectures of Possibility: After Innovative Writing
- Author: Lance Olsen
- Language: English
- Genre: Literary Theory
- Publisher: Raw Dog Screaming Press
- Publication date: February 29, 2012
- Publication place: United States
- Pages: 252
- ISBN: 1935738194

Architectures of Possibility: After Innovative Writing is a theoretical anti-textbook by Lance Olsen, written in collaboration with Trevor Dodge, published in 2012.

== Structure & Ideas ==
Architectures of Possibility challenges the often unconscious assumptions behind conventional writing practices: how and why, for instance, time, scene, and characterization function. It also tracks a number of trends in contemporary writing, such as electronic literature and literary activism, and sketches in the current marketplace, while providing many exercises and supplemental reading lists. In addition, it provides more than 40 interviews with such innovative authors as Robert Coover, Lydia Davis, Brian Evenson, Shelley Jackson, Ben Marcus, Carole Maso, D. Harlan Wilson and Scott McCloud. Instead of suggesting rules or guidelines for writing, as most traditional writing guides do, Architectures of Possibility argues writing is a "possibility space where everything can and should be considered, attempted, and troubled."

== Reception ==
American Book Review remarks that Architectures of Possibility "de-naturalizes mimetic fiction and offers innovative fiction as the way to represent life/existence in the twenty-first century, with innovation stemming from a writer allowing her presence to become a 'desirous embrace' of her contemporary reality," while Media and Culture underscores "Lance Olsen is interested in creative writing as a 'series of choices,' whereby to 'write one way rather than another is to convey, not simply an aesthetics, but a course of thinking, a course of being in the world, that privileges one approach to 'reality' over another.'"

== Links ==
- Architectures of Possibility companion website
- Possible Architect Podcast: affiliated podcast hosted by AoP collaborator Trevor Dodge
