= Girl Imagined by Chance =

Novel by Lance Olsen

- Author: Lance Olsen
- Language: English
- Genre: Postmodern novel, Metafiction
- Publisher: FC2
- Publication date: September 25, 2002
- Publication place: United States
- Pages: 328
- ISBN: 1573661031

Girl Imagined by Chance is a postmodern novel by Lance Olsen, published in 2002 by Fiction Collective Two. It is a work of metafiction designed to trouble the unexamined assumptions of the memoir.

== Narrative structure ==
The novel is composed of twelve chapters, each of which is preceded by a photograph. In other words, its structure suggests a single roll of film. Girl Imagined by Chance explores the nature of photography, thereby raising questions about the simulated and the real, the mediatization of consciousness, originality, and the construction of identity. It examines the way images both give rise to and complicate memory. In this way, it is indebted to such theoretical works as Jean Baudrillard's Simulacra and Simulation and Roland Barthes's Camera Lucida, allusions to both of which appear in its pages.

== Reception ==
Rain Taxi called Olsen's novel "a book about the image of reality," drew connections between it and Edward Albee's play Who's Afraid of Virginia Woolf?, and emphasized its rare investigation into "couples who consciously elect to remain childless," while Paul Petrovic's essay in Extrapolation limns the relationship of Girl Imagined by Chance to Baudrillard's concepts of simulation and reproduction, and Jean-Luc Marion's phenomenology.
