= Sound of Pig =

American record label

Sound of Pig Catalogue Cover and Logo

Sound of Pig was a cassette culture label started in 1984 by Al Margolis in New York City. The label released hundreds of original cassettes between 1984 and 1990. It featured Margolis' own audio art projects that he recorded under the name of If, Bwana, plus a large number of national and international noise music artists.
