= Thomas Wiloch =

American writer

Thomas Wiloch (February 3, 1953 – September 4, 2008) was an American author, editor, poet, and illustrator.

== Profile ==
Born in Detroit, Michigan. Wiloch was the principal instigator and editor of Grimoire, a journal of surrealistic art and literature published from 1982 to 1985 that featured some of the earliest published work by the notable American horror writer Thomas Ligotti. After working on the editorial staff of Gale, a reference book publisher, for some 26 years, Wiloch became a freelance writer and editor in 2004.

Much of Wiloch's recent published writing is prose poetry, and has appeared in collections from various small press publishers including Snake Press and Wordcraft of Oregon. From 1988 to 1993, Wiloch authored the column "Codes and Chaos" for the arts magazine PhotoStatic. He was an associate editor of Sidereality magazine, 2004–05.

Wiloch has illustrated books by authors such as Bruce Boston, Robert Frazier, Andrew Joron, and Jessica Amanda Salmonson, as well as his work.

== Praise ==
Wiloch was described by Greg Body in Asylum as "one of a handful of contemporary American masters of the prose miniature".

Writing in the Gore Letter, Michael Arnzen stated that "Wiloch has been quietly working away in relative obscurity in his own 'niche' for two decades, developing a one-of-a-kind approach to a form he almost entirely owns. Wiloch writes surrealist short-short pieces, often no longer than a page, that are as philosophical as they are whimsical, as clever as they are poetic, and as disturbing as they are intelligent."

According to Bruce Boston, writing in Illumen magazine, Wiloch is "arguably the leading writer of prose poems in the genre field for the last two decades." English writer and artist A.C. Evans wrote in Stride magazine that Wiloch portrays "fragmentary confrontation with alien Otherness described in a symbolic vocabulary of closed rooms, casual catastrophe, uncanny Fortean phenomena, rituals of cruelty, and fleeting visions of transmundane worlds."

== Bibliography ==
=== Prose poem collections ===
- Paper Mask (1988)
- The Mannikin Cypher (1989)
- Tales of Lord Shantih (1989)
- Mr. Templeton's Toyshop (1995)
- Stigmata Junction (2005)
- Screaming in Code (2006)

=== Collections of cut-up haiku ===
- Night Rain (1991)
- Decoded Factories of the Heart (1991)
- Narcotic Signature (1992)
- Lyrical Brandy (1993)
- Neon Trance (1997)

=== Nonfiction ===
- Directory of Michigan Literary Publishers (1982)
- Everything You Need to Know about Protecting Yourself and Others Against Abduction (1998)
- Crime: A Serious American Problem (2004)
- National Security (2005)
- Prisons and Jails: A Deterrent to Crime? (2005)

=== Illustrations for works by others ===
- Sensuous Debris – Bruce Boston
- The Eleventh Jaguarundi – Jessica Amanda Salmonson
- Invisible Machines – Andrew Joron and Robert Frazier,

=== Poetry Collaborations ===
- The Newcomer – co-authored with t. Winter-Damon (Xanadu 2, Tor Books, 1994)
