= If, Bwana =

American noise music artist

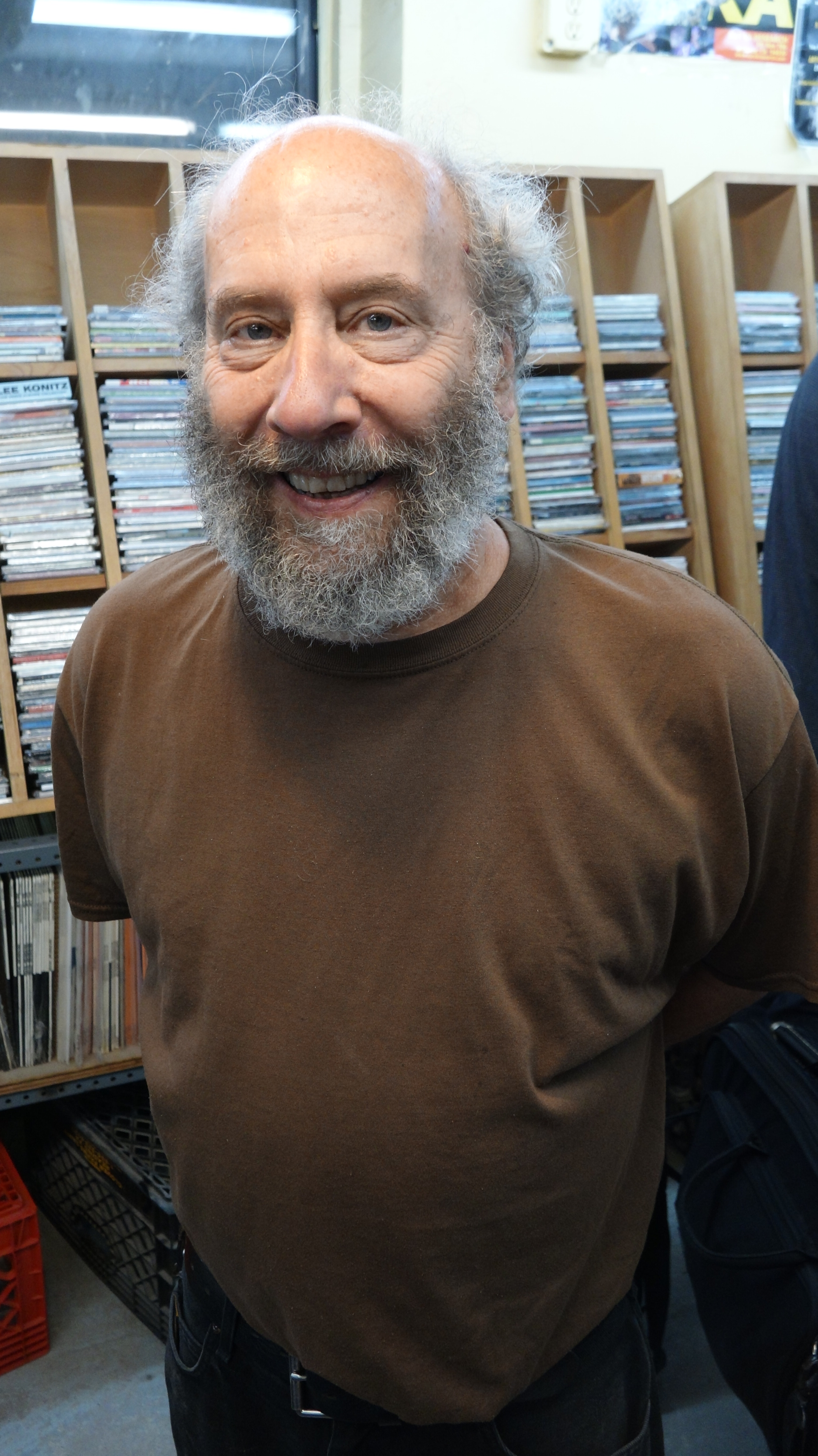
- Margolis at Downtown Music Gallery, 2025

Background information
- Born: Alan M. Margolis
- Genres: Noise music
- Occupations: Musician; record producer
- Labels: Sound of Pig; Pogus Productions

Alan M. Margolis, known professionally as If, Bwana, is a noise music artist.

== History ==
Margolis has been working under the musical pseudonym "If, Bwana" since New Year's Day, 1984. The moniker is an acronym for "It's Funny, But We Are Not Amused". He has since earned an international reputation for his experimental noise music.

== Recording history ==
Margolis's style is a fusion of ambient, industrial, and musique concrète, often featuring strange soundscapes that are described as both balmy and unnerving at the same time.

Margolis has also been very active as the owner of two labels: the cassette label Sound of Pig and, since the 1990s, Pogus Productions, a CD label with a focus on experimental contemporary classical music.

== See also ==
- Noise music
- List of noise musicians
- Cassette culture
