= Hugh Fox =

American poet

- Born: Hugh Bernard Fox Jr. February 12, 1932; Chicago, Illinois, U.S.
- Died: September 4, 2011 (aged 79); East Lansing, Michigan, U.S.
- Education: University of Illinois at Urbana-Champaign (PhD)
- Occupations: Writer; novelist; poet; anthropologist

Hugh Bernard Fox Jr. (February 12, 1932 – September 4, 2011) was a writer, novelist, poet and anthropologist and one of the founders (with Ralph Ellison, Anaïs Nin, Paul Bowles, Joyce Carol Oates, Buckminster Fuller and others) of the Pushcart Prize for literature. He has been published in literary magazines and was the first writer to publish a critical study of Charles Bukowski.

== Life and career ==
Fox was born and raised in Chicago as a devout Catholic, but converted to Judaism in later life. After completing his studies at Loyola University Chicago, he went on to receive a Ph.D. in American Literature from the University of Illinois at Urbana-Champaign, and was a professor at Loyola Marymount University, and then Michigan State University in the Department of American Thought and Language from 1968 until his retirement in 1999. Hugh Fox died on September 4, 2011, in East Lansing, Michigan.

== Works ==
Fox was the author of over sixty-two books, including six books on anthropology. He wrote over fifty-four books on poetry and many volumes on short fiction, and published many novels. Fox also wrote a number of books on pre-Columbian American cultures and catastrophism. Some of these works were labeled in the pseudoarchaeological category, such as his book Gods of the Cataclysm: A Revolutionary Investigation of Man and his Gods Before and After the Great Cataclysm (1976). Some of his books with these themes have been compared to the work of Ignatius Donnelly.

His book Gods of the Cataclysm received a number of positive reviews. Editor Curt Johnson praised the book claiming "Hugh Fox’s Gods of the Cataclysm...ought to be required reading for cultural historians of all disciplines," and Robert Sagehorn of The Western World Review cited Hugh Fox as "... one of the foremost authorities (perhaps the foremost authority) on pre-Columbian American cultures." Gods of the Cataclysm was revised and re-released in the summer of 2011 by Aardwolfe Books.

His novel Shaman was published by Permeable Press in 1993. Shaman is a semi-autobiographical account of a cross-dressing poet and novelist traveling to literary conferences and events, and details the reactions of the narrator's friends, rivals, and academic colleagues.

The Ibbetson Street Press of Somerville, Massachusetts, published Way, Way Off the Road: The Memoirs of an Invisible Man by Hugh Fox with an introduction by Doug Holder in 2006. This book recounts Fox's life and the people he knew from his extensive associations with the "Small Press" marketplace over the years, including Charles Bukowski, A. D. Winans, Sam Cornish, Len Fulton, and numerous other people.

Skylight Press of Cheltenham, United Kingdom published the novels "Depths and Dragons" and "Immortal Jaguar" by Hugh Fox in 2010, followed by the novel "The Dream of the Black Topaze Chamber" in 2011. Skylight Press will also be publishing a posthumous novel "Portrait of Sweeney" in 2016.

Sunbury Press of Mechanicsburg, Pennsylvania published "Who, Me?" by Hugh Fox in June 2011. This autobiography recounted his personal life and some of his unusual relationships. His collection of short stories "Through a Glass Darkly" was released in May 2011.

Fox's novel The Lord Said Unto Satan was published in the spring of 2011 by Post Mortem Press (Cincinnati). His final novel was Reunion, published by Luminis Books in summer 2011. Also in summer, 2011, Ravenna Press published his description in prose poems of one year of his life in E. Lansing, MI, "The Year Book."

== See also ==
- Tertius Chandler
- John Philip Cohane
