= Permeable Press =

San Francisco-based literary publishing company

Permeable Press was a San Francisco-based literary publishing company founded in 1990 by Brian Charles Clark. A "micropress" operating on less than U.S.$100,000 per year, Permeable published a number of trade paperback books, chapbooks, and the literary magazines Puck, Shock Waves, Q-Zine, Naked Review, and Xerotic Ephemera in the early and mid-1990s. Clark sold Permeable Press to Cambrian Publications in 1997.

== List of books published ==
- Shaman by Hugh Fox (1993)
- The Naughty Yard by Michael Hemmingson (1994) ISBN 1-882633-02-4 reprinted in The Mammoth Book of International Erotica (Carroll & Graf, 1996) ISBN 0-7867-0373-3
- Tonguing the Zeitgeist by Lance Olsen (1994; finalist for the Philip K. Dick Award) ISBN 1-882633-04-0
- Cher Wolfe & Other Stories by Mary Leary (1994)
- Once by Hugh Fox (1995)
- The Final Dream & Other Fictions by Daniel Pearlman (1995)
- Some Girls by Sarah Hafner (1995)
- Reasons For Not Sleeping by Michelle Ben-Hur (1995)
- At The News of Your Death by Joshua Beckman (1995)
- A Beginner's Guide to Art Deconstruction by Norman Conquest (1995)
- Crack Hotel by Michael Hemmingson (1995)
- Three-Hand Jax and Other Spells by Staszek (pen name of Stan Henry; 1996; finalist for the Lambda Literary Award)
- Stairway to the Sun by Hugh Fox (1996)
- The Larger Earth: Descending Notes of a Grounded Astronaut by David Memmott (1996)
- Objects Left Too Long In One Place by Catherine Scherer (1996)
- The Marquis de Sade's Elements of Style by Derek Pell (1996)
- Time Famine by Lance Olsen (1996)
- Toxic Shock Syndrome by Carolina Vegas Starr (1996)
- Flyscraper: Day of the Fly by Mark Romyn (1996)
- The Uncertainty Principle by Steven J. Frank (1997; winner of the Pocket Rocket Award for First Novel)
- Flying Saucers Over Hennepin by Peter Gelman (1997)
- Remote Control by Doug Henderson (1997)
- Minstrels by Michael Hemmingson (1997)
- Manson Family Picnic by R. Downey (1997)
- Ciphers by Paul Di Filippo (1997; co-published with Cambrian Publications)
- Scratch: Four Stories by Nikki Dillon (pen name of Lisa Dierbeck; 1997)
- Shock Waves contributors included Thom Metzger and Paul Di Filippo.
