= Fiction International =

- Discipline: Literary journal
- Language: English
- Edited by: Harold Jaffe

Publication details
- History: 1973–2023
- Publisher: San Diego State University
- Frequency: Annual

Standard abbreviations
- ISO 4: Fict. Int.

Indexing
- ISSN: 0092-1912

Links
- Journal homepage

Fiction International was a literary magazine devoted to innovative forms of fiction and non-fiction which addresses progressive political ideals. Founded at St. Lawrence University in Canton, New York, by Joe David Bellamy in 1973, the magazine moved to San Diego State University in 1983, where it has been "edited by Harold Jaffe and Larry McCaffery until 1992, when Harold Jaffe assumed sole editorship". Over the years, the magazine published works by Jaffe, J. M. Coetzee, Claribel Alegría, Robert Coover, William S. Burroughs, Alberto Moravia, Malcolm X, Allen Ginsberg, Marguerite Duras, Edmund White, Kathy Acker, Eckhard Gerdes, Sean Gill, Alain Robbe-Grillet, Clarice Lispector, and Roque Dalton.

Fiction International announced that it was ceasing publication after its 56th issue in spring 2023.
