= Don Webb (writer) =

American novelist

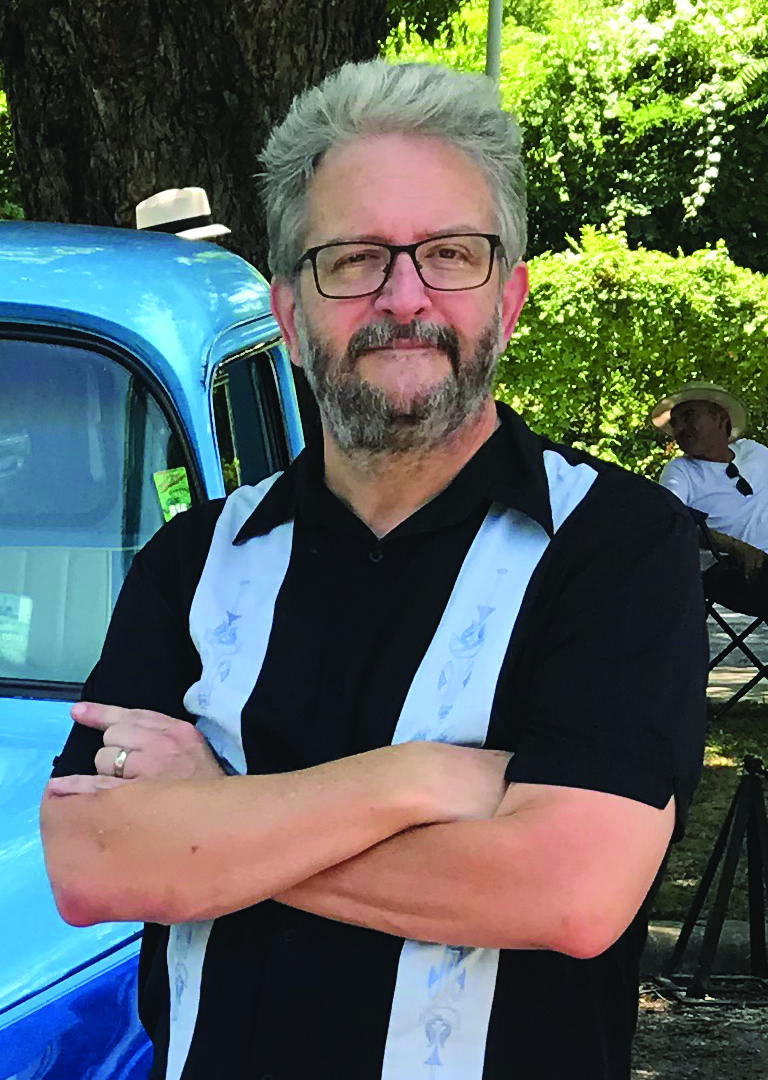
- Don Webb in 2018
- Born: 1960 (age 65–66)
- Occupations: Novelist; essayist; literary instructor
- Writing career
- Genres: Science fiction, horror

Don Webb (born 1960) is an American science fiction and mystery writer, as well as an author of several books on Left Hand Path occult philosophy. He is also a former High Priest of the Temple of Set.

== Writing career ==
Webb's first professional fiction sale was the short story "Rhinestone Manifesto", published in Interzone 13, Autumn 1985. He is best known for weird, experimental, and offbeat fiction, as well as works inspired by H. P. Lovecraft and according to Locus Magazine, he has published many stories, essays, interviews and other writings. His short stories have appeared or been referenced in numerous anthologies, including The Year's Best Science Fiction: Eleventh Annual Collection, Asimov's Science Fiction and The Magazine of Fantasy & Science Fiction His story "The Great White Bed" (F&SF May 2007) was nominated for the International Horror Critics Award.

Webb has published 12 books and over 400 other items covering a broad range of topics. Webb is a member of the Turkey City Writer's Workshop. He currently lives in Austin, Texas and teaches creative writing at the University of California, Los Angeles.

== Magico-religious activities ==
Webb served as High Priest of the Temple of Set from 1993 to 2002. Accordingly, he is an authority regarding the Temple of Set and its inner workings and has published several works of non-fiction on the topic. The Temple of Set continues to publish several of his articles as recommended introductory material for prospective members.

== Bibliography ==
=== Books ===
Fiction

- Judas Payne: A Weird Western / Webb's Weird Wild West: Western Tales of Horror (double book with Michael Hemmingson, Wildside Press, 2010) ISBN 1-4344-1194-X
- When They Came (Temporary Culture, 2006) ISBN 0-9764660-1-5
- Endless Honeymoon (St. Martin's Minotaur, 2001) ISBN 0-312-26582-4
- Essential Saltes (St. Martin's Press, 1999) ISBN 0-312-20302-0
- Serenade at the End of Time (Bereshith Pub, January 1999)
- The Explanation and Other Good Advice (Wordcraft of Oregon, 1998) ISBN 1-877655-25-2
- The Double: An Investigation (St. Martin's Press, 1998) ISBN 0-312-19144-8
- Anubis on Guard Selected Poetry of Don Webb (Dark Regions Press 1998)
- Stealing My Rules (CyberPsychos AOD Books, 1997) ISBN 1-886988-05-6
- A Spell for the Fulfillment of Desire (Black Ice Books, 1996) ISBN 1-57366-012-4
- The Seventh Day and After (Wordcraft of Oregon, 1993), ISBN 1-877655-05-8
- Märchenland ist abgebrannt: Profane Mythen aus Milwaukee (short story collection, translated by Susanna Harringer, Guthmann-Peterson, 1989)
- Uncle Ovid's Exercise Book (Illinois State University Press, Fiction Collective Two, 1987)
- The Bestseller and Others (Chris Drumm Publications)

Non-fiction

- The Seven Faces of Darkness (Occult non-fiction, Runa-Raven Press) ISBN 1-885972-07-5
- Uncle Setnakt's Essential Guide to the Left Hand Path (Occult non-fiction) ISBN 1-885972-10-5
- Mysteries of the Temple of Set: Inner Teachings of the Left Hand Path (Occult non-fiction) ISBN 1-885972-27-X
- Aleister Crowley: The Fire and the Force (Occult non-fiction) ISBN 1-885972-28-8
- Overthrowing the Old Gods: Aleister Crowley and the Book of the Law (Occult non-fiction) ISBN 1-62055-189-6
- Set the Outsider (with Judith Page) (Occult non-fiction) ISBN 978-1548138066
- Uncle SetNakt's Nightbook (Occult non-fiction) ISBN 978-1885972897
- Energy Magick of the Vampyre (Occult non-fiction) ISBN 978-1644111321
- How To Become a Modern Magus (Occult non-fiction) ISBN 978-1644113424

=== Short fiction ===
Collections

- Webb, Don (2014). Through Dark angles : works inspired by H. P. Lovecraft. Hippocampus Press.

Stories

Title	Year	First published	Reprinted/collected	Notes
Pollution	2014	Webb, Don (April 2014). "Pollution". Analog Science Fiction and Fact. 134 (4): 32–37.		
To Mars and Providence			War of the Worlds: Global Dispatches, Bantam Spectra, 1996; Eternal Lovecraft: The Persistence of HPL in Popular Culture, edited by Jim Turner, Golden Gryphon Press, 1998	

- "Tamarii Notebook" (in More Amazing Stories, edited by Kim Mohan, Tor, 1998)
- "Four-and-Twenty" (Originally published in Pulphouse: The Hardback Magazine Issue 7: Spring 1990 (Pulphouse Publishing, Spring 1990)
- "The Key to the Mysteries" (Originally published in Grue Magazine, 1989, collected in The Explanation and Other Good Advice, 1998)
- "In the Wings" (Originally published in Pulphouse: The Hardback Magazine Issue 3: Spring 1989 (Pulphouse Publishing, Spring 1989)
- London is Calling with t. Winter-Damon (Back Brain Recluse, 1989; The Explanation and Other Good Advice collection, Wordcraft of Oregon, 1998)
- Pulphouse Issue 19

=== Non-fiction ===
- Webb, Don (February 2001). "The Box from Japan by Harry Stephen Keeler (1932)". Curiosities. F&SF. 100 (2): 162. Archived from the original on December 27, 2004.

== Reviews ==
- "Book Becoming Power" by Henry Wessells (New York Review of Science Fiction, March 2000)
- "Webb on the Web" by Jon Lebkowsky (The Austin Chronicle, Vol. 17, No. 47, July 31, 1998)
