= Rain Taxi =

Book review and literary organization

- Fall 2011 cover
- Frequency: Quarterly
- Founder: Carolyn Kuebler and Randall Heath
- Founded: 1996; 30 years ago
- Company: Rain Taxi, Inc.
- Country: United States
- Based in: Minneapolis
- Language: English
- Website: www.raintaxi.com
- ISSN: 1943-4383

Rain Taxi is a Minneapolis-based book review and literary organization. In addition to publishing its quarterly print edition, Rain Taxi maintains an online edition with distinct content, sponsors the Twin Cities Book Festival, hosts readings, and publishes chapbooks through its Brainstorm Series. Rain Taxi's mission is "to advance independent literary culture through publications and programs that foster awareness and appreciation of innovative writing." The magazine is free on the newsstand. It is also available through paid subscription. Structurally, Rain Taxi is a 501(c)(3) non-profit. It sells advertising at below market rates, much of it to literary presses.

== History ==
The magazine was founded in 1996 by Carolyn Kuebler, Randall Heath, and David Caligiuri (who resigned with issue one). Editor Eric Lorberer joined the staff after issue one. The magazine is art-directed and business-managed by Kelly Everding.

Rain Taxi has been lauded for its role in bringing to light books which might not otherwise be reviewed. The magazine publishes relatively few dismissive reviews. It has been awarded the 2000 Utne Reader Alternative Press Award for Best Arts and Literature Coverage and Best Literary Journal in City Pages (Minneapolis). Editor Eric Lorberer was named to the Publishers Weekly "The Twin Cities Top 10".

An exception to the lack of controversy was David Foster Wallace's Summer 2001 review of The Best of the Prose Poem: An International Journal (White Pine Press). The review, which took the form of a bullet-pointed index that "broke down the anthology into numerical components", inflamed many of the book's contributors. See responses in Fall 2001 print edition of the magazine.

== Rain Taxi Review of Books (Print) ==
Rain Taxi focuses on literary fiction, poetry, and non-fiction with an emphasis on small press and offbeat books. The review features interviews with prominent writers such as Lydia Davis and Tao Lin; reviewers include Sharon Mesmer, Jacob Appel, Spencer Dew, and Mark Terrill.

== Raintaxi.com ==
The site includes distinct content not found in the print edition, as well as information about events publications.

== Brainstorm Series Chapbooks ==
Rain Taxi publishes limited edition chapbooks, each limited to 300 copies or less. Authors have included Kees 't Hart, Alice Notley, Donald Revell, Dara Wier, Nathaniel Tarn, Paul Auster, Russell Edson, Anne Waldman and Rikki Ducornet (collaboration), Kai Nieminen, James Tate, Stephen Dixon, Paul Metcalf, and Clayton Eshleman.

== Twin Cities Book Festival ==
Rain Taxi launched the Twin Cities Book Festival in 2001. The festival includes readings, talks, book signings, panel discussions, children's activities, book arts demonstrations, a used book sale, and a Literary Magazine Fair.

== Rain Taxi Readings ==
The Rain Taxi Reading Series began in 1998 and has hosted more than 200 writers.
