= M. Christian =

American novelist

M. Christian was an author and anthologist working in a variety of genres including horror, science fiction, erotica and crime. Much of his work combined sexual themes with either the horror or science fiction genre.

M. Christian died on January 1, 2026.

== Selected bibliography ==
Among his works are:

- The Bachelor Machine (collection, 2003),
- Amazons: Tales of Strong Women
- Blood Lust: Erotic Vampire Tales (Paperback)
- Confessions: Admissions of Sexual Guilt (Paperback)
- More Extreme Stories about Extreme Sex, Vol. 2

== Plot summaries ==
- Running Dry (novel, 2006) (ISBN 1-55583-807-3)

Running Dry concerns a painter, who receives a letter he last saw in 1913, at current moment of his death.

- Amazons: Tales of Strong Women (ISBN 9781560257608)

Tales of Strong Women examines "the common thread of women exhibiting strength and power".

- Blood Lust: Erotic Vampire Tales (Paperback)

Who would know vampires have other things on their mind other than blood?

- Confessions: Admissions of Sexual Guilt (Paperback) (ISBN 9781560257585)

Confessions: Admissions of Sexual Guilt looks at several writers' exploration of sexual confessions' impact.

== See also ==
- Sex in science fiction
- List of horror fiction authors
