= Harold Jaffe =

American novelist (1938–2024)

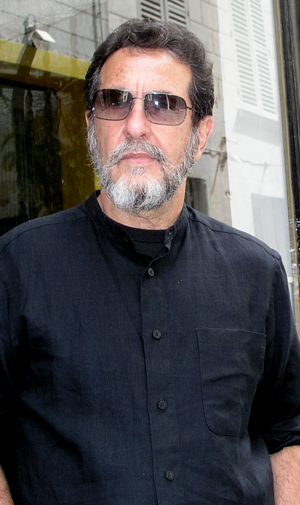
- Born: July 8, 1938; New York City, U.S.
- Died: June 23, 2024 (aged 85); San Diego, California, U.S.
- Education: Ph.D, English and American Literature
- Alma mater: Grinnell College (undergraduate studies) New York University (graduate studies)
- Occupations: Novelist; essayist; editor; professor
- Writing career
- Notable awards: Pushcart Prize (three), National Endowment for the Arts Grant in Fiction (two), California Arts Council Grant in Fiction
- Website: haroldjaffe.wordpress.com

Harold Jaffe (July 8, 1938 – June 23, 2024) was an American writer of novels, short fiction, drama, and essays. He was the author of 30 books, including 14 collections of fiction, four novels, and two volumes of essays. He was also the editor of the literary-cultural journal Fiction International. He had won two NEA grants in fiction and two Fulbright fellowships. His works have been translated into 15 languages, including German, Japanese, Spanish, Italian, French, Turkish, Dutch, Czech, and Serbo-Croatian. Jaffe was also a professor of Creative Writing, English, and Comparative Literature at San Diego State University. Jaffe died on June 23, 2024, at the age of 85.

Jaffe's fiction has appeared in such journals as Mississippi Review; City Lights Review; Paris Review; New Directions in Prose and Poetry; Chicago Review; Chelsea; Fiction; Central Park; Witness; Black Ice; Minnesota Review; Boundary 2; ACM; Black Warrior Review; Cream City Review; Two Girls’ Review; and New Novel Review. His fictions have also been anthologized in Pushcart Prize; Best American Stories; Best of American Humor; Storming the Reality Studio; American Made; Avant Pop: Fiction for a Daydreaming Nation; After Yesterday's Crash: The Avant-Pop Anthology; Bateria and Am Lit (Germany); Borderlands (Mexico); Praz (Italy); Positive (Japan); and elsewhere.

The 2004 issue of The Journal of Experimental Fiction called “The Literary Terrorism of Harold Jaffe” was devoted to his writings.

Jaffe was well known for his technique of docufiction, a literary form that treats and fictionalizes news reports and other published data to expose their philosophical underpinnings, ambiguities, nuances, and hidden agendas. In addition to Docufiction, both Guerilla Writing and Unsituated Dialogue were literary terms Jaffe created..

== Works ==
=== Novels ===
- Mole's Pity (1979)
- Dos Indios (1983)
- Othello Blues (1996)
- Jesus Coyote (2008)
- Brando Bleeds (2022)

=== Docufiction collections ===
- Son of Sam (2001)
- False Positive (2002)
- Nazis, Sharks & Serial Killers (2003)
- 15 Serial Killers (2003)
- Terror-Dot-Gov (2005)
- Paris 60 (2010)
- Anti-Twitter (2010)
- OD (2012)
- Induced Coma (2014)
- Death Cafe (2015)
- Goosestep (2016)
- Sacred Outcast (2017)
- Porn-anti-Porn (2019)
- Brut: Writings on Art & Artists (2021)
- Performances for the End of Time (2022)
- Kafka Kafka (2024)
- The Infected Desert (2024)

=== Fiction collections ===
- Mourning Crazy Horse (1982)
- Beasts (1986)
- Madonna and Other Spectacles (1988)
- Eros Anti-Eros (1990)
- Straight Razor (1995)
- Sex for the Millennium (1999)
- Strange Fruit & Other Plays (2021)
- Sacrifice (2022)
- Single-Sentence Stories (with Tom Whalen) (2023)

=== Essay collections ===
- Beyond the Techno-Cave: A Guerrilla Writer’s Guide to Post-Millennial Culture (2006)
- Revolutionary Brain (2012)
