= Lance Olsen =

American writer (born 1956)

- Olsen at Boston Book Festival in 2026
- Born: October 14, 1956 (age 70); New Jersey, United States
- Education: University of Wisconsin–Madison (BA); Iowa Writers' Workshop (MFA); University of Virginia (MA, PhD)
- Occupations: Writer, Professor Emeritus
- Spouse: Andi Olsen (m. 1981)
- Writing career
- Period: Contemporary
- Genres: Novel, Short Story, Criticism
- Website: www.lanceolsen.com

Lance Olsen (born October 14, 1956) is an American writer known for his experimental, lyrical, fragmentary, cross-genre narratives that question the limits of historical knowledge.

== Biography ==
Lance Olsen was born in River Edge, New Jersey, United States. He received a B.A. degree from the University of Wisconsin–Madison (1978, honors, Phi Beta Kappa), an M.F.A. from the Iowa Writers' Workshop (1980), and an M.A. (1982) and Ph.D. (1985) from the University of Virginia.

For ten years he taught as associate and then full professor at the University of Idaho; for two years, he directed the University of Idaho's M.F.A. program. He has also taught at the University of Iowa, the University of Virginia, the University of Kentucky, on summer and semester-abroad programs in Oxford and London, on a Fulbright in Turku, Finland, and at various writing conferences. From 2007 to 2023, he taught experimental narrative theory and practice at the University of Utah. From 2002 to 2018, he served as chair of the board of directors at Fiction Collective Two, or FC2; founded in 1974, FC2 is one of America's best-known ongoing literary experiments and progressive art communities. He was fiction editor at Western Humanities Review from 2007 to 2013. He served as Director of Creative Writing at the University of Utah from 2018 to 2019.

Olsen's wife is assemblage-artist Andi Olsen.

== Writing ==
Olsen is author of seventeen novels, one hypermedia text, six nonfiction books, five short-story collections, a poetry chapbook, and two anti-textbooks about experimental writing, as well as editor of two collections of essays about innovative contemporary fiction. His short stories, essays, poems, and reviews have appeared in hundreds of journals, magazines, and anthologies, including Conjunctions, Fiction International, Iowa Review, Village Voice, Time Out New York, BOMB, Hotel Amerika, and Best American Non-Required Reading. He is known for his fictional biographies (examples of historiographic metafiction), such as Nietzsche's Kisses and Head in Flames, for which he does extensive historical research, as well as his work in avantpop, postmodernism, speculative fiction, experimental writing practices, and critifiction (the blending of theory and narrativity in a single text).

The hypermedial version of his novel 10:01, created in collaboration with artist Tim S. Guthrie, was published by the Iowa Review Web in 2005 and included in the Electronic Literature Organization Collection: Volume One. Olsen was a regular participant in the biennial &NOW Festival, a celebration of experimental and innovative writing, and has collaborated with a board member of &NOW, Davis Schneiderman, on a series of short works.

== Awards ==
In March 2025, Olsen was awarded a Connecticut Artistic Excellence Grant. In May 2022, he was a fellow at The Rockefeller Bellagio Center on Lake Como, Italy. In the spring of 2018, he taught a seminar on Experimental Forms and delivered two lectures as Chaire des Amériques at the Institut des Amériques de Rennes at the University of Rennes. From May 2015 through April 2016, Olsen was a guest at the DAAD Artists-in-Berlin Program. He was the Mary Ellen von der Heyden Berlin Prize in Fiction Fellow at the American Academy in Berlin from January through May 2013 and the Mellon International Visiting Senior Scholar at Rhodes University in Grahamstown, South Africa, in October 2013. He is a Guggenheim and a two-time N.E.A. fellowship recipient, winner of a Pushcart Prize, and was the governor-appointed Idaho Writer-in-Residence from 1996 to 1998. His 1994 novel Tonguing the Zeitgeist was a finalist for the Philip K. Dick Award, and his work has been translated into Arabic, Croatian, Finnish, German, Italian, Polish, Russian, Spanish, and Turkish.

== Bibliography ==
=== Novels ===
- Live from Earth (NY: Available Press/Ballantine Books, 1991)
- Tonguing the Zeitgeist (San Francisco, CA: Permeable Press,1994)
- Burnt (La Grande, OR: Wordcraft, 1996)
- Time Famine (San Francisco, CA: Permeable Press, 1996)
- Freaknest (La Grande, OR: Wordcraft, 2000)
- Girl Imagined by Chance (Tallahassee, FL: Fiction Collective Two, 2002)
- 10:01 (print version: Portland, OR: Chiasmus Press, 2005; hypermedia version: Iowa Review Web 7.2 November 2005)
- Nietzsche's Kisses (Tallahassee, FL: Fiction Collective Two, 2006)
- Anxious Pleasures: A Novel After Kafka (Emeryville, CA: Shoemaker & Hoard, 2007)
- Head in Flames (Portland, OR: Chiasmus Press, 2009)
- Calendar of Regrets (Tuscaloosa, AL: Fiction Collective Two, 2010)
- Theories of Forgetting (Tuscaloosa, AL: Fiction Collective Two, 2014)
- There's No Place Like Time: A Retrospective (Lake Forest, IL: &Now Books, 2016)
- Dreamlives of Debris (Ann Arbor, MI: Dzanc Books, 2017)
- My Red Heaven (Ann Arbor, MI: Dzanc Books, 2020)
- Skin Elegies (Ann Arbor, MI: Dzanc Books, 2021)
- Always Crashing in the Same Car: A Novel After David Bowie (Tuscaloosa, AL: Fiction Collective Two, 2023)
- Absolute Away (Ann Arbor, MI: Dzanc Books, 2024)
- An Inventory of Benevolent Butterflies (Ann Arbor, MI: Dzanc Books, October 2026)

=== Anti-textbooks ===
- Rebel Yell: Writing Fiction (San Jose: Cambrian Press, 1998)
- Architectures of Possibility: After Innovative Writing (Washington, D.C.: Raw Dog Screaming Press, 2012)

=== Nonfiction ===
- Ellipse of Uncertainty: An Introduction to Postmodern Fantasy (Westport, CT: Greenwood Press, 1987)
- Circus of the Mind in Motion: Postmodernism and the Comic Vision (Detroit: Wayne State University Press, 1990)
- William Gibson (Mercer Island, WA: Starmont House, 1992)
- Surfing Tomorrow: Essays on the Future of American Fiction (Prairie Village: Potpourri, 1995), editor
- Lolita: A Janus Text (NY: Twayne, 1995)
- In Memoriam to Postmodernism: Essays on the Avant-Pop, co-edited with Mark Amerika (SDSU Press, 1995)
- There (Anti-Oedipus Press, 2014)
- Shrapnel: Contemplations (Anti-Oedipus Press, 2024)

=== Short story collections ===
- My Dates With Franz (Amherst, MA: Bluestone Press, 1993)
- Scherzi, I Believe (La Grande, OR: Wordcraft, 1994)
- Sewing Shut My Eyes (Normal/Tallahassee: Fiction Collective Two/Black Ice, 2000)
- Hideous Beauties (Portland, OR: Eraserhead, 2003)
- How to Unfeel the Dead: New & Selected Fictions (Toronto: Teksteditions, 2014)
