= Michael Hemmingson =

Novelist, anthologist, critic, cultural anthropologist, playwright (1966–2014)

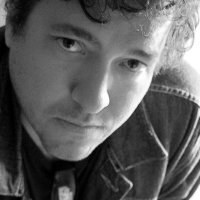
- Hemmingson in January 2004
- Born: July 12, 1966; Los Angeles, California, US
- Died: January 9, 2014 (aged 47); Tijuana, Mexico
- Occupations: Novelist, journalist, short story writer, essayist, cultural anthropologist, qualitative researcher
- Writing career
- Period: 1982–2014
- Genres: Literary fiction; genre fiction
- Notable works: The Naughty Yard; Hard Cold Whisper
- Literary movement: culture; violence, autoethnography
- Website: mhemmingson.wordpress.com

Michael Hemmingson (July 12, 1966 – January 9, 2014) was a novelist, short story writer, literary critic, cultural anthropologist, qualitative researcher, playwright, music critic, and screenwriter. He died in Tijuana, Mexico on 9 January 2014 reportedly of cardiac arrest.

== Publishing history ==
As an independent scholar, Hemmingson wrote Gordon Lish and His Influence on Twentieth Century American Literature, a meditative work; a short TV studies monograph on Star Trek (Wayne State University Press), and an ethnographic research project, Zona Norte (Cambridge Scholars). At the time of his death he was working on a biography of Raymond Carver, set for publication in 2014 by McFarland & Company in Jefferson, North Carolina.

Hemmingson was a prolific writer, often publishing 2-3 books a year. According to one reviewer, "Hemmingson has written over fifty books, and his experience shows. Not only does he inform the stories in This Other Eden with tangible details of the publishing industry, but he also imbues his characters with personalities that are displayed through his skillful use of highly individualized dialogue for each person."

He was a staff writer at the San Diego Reader in San Diego, California from November 2004 through January 2014. The last public article he wrote for the San Diego Reader was a critical music review of the rookie project, Million Dollar Mixtape by San Diego recording artist The Toven released in 2012. The review was published by the San Diego Reader on January 6, 2014 only three days before his death on January 9, 2014. Many of the photos which accompany his articles were taken by San Diego's iconic brand photographer, Chris Morrow. In 2010 Hemmingson joined the staff of Pacific San Diego Magazine.

== Film ==
As a screenwriter, his first indie feature, The Watermelon, was directed by Brad Mays and produced by Lorenda Starfelt at LightSong Films. He wrote the screenplay for the 2007 film Aliens, based on a one act play. Maxim Dashkin produced and directed.

Real Ideas Studio produced a short documentary, "Life in Zona Norte," which was screened at Cannes Film Festival's Short Film Corner May, 2009.

== Awards and honors ==
Hemmingson won the San Diego Book Awards Association's first Novel-in-Progress grant for The Rose of Heaven and SDBAA's Best Published novel for Wild Turkey. His media study monograph, Star Trek: A Post-Structural Critique of the Original Series, was a 2010 finalist nominee for General Non-fiction Book. He was selected as the toastmaster for the Death Equinox 2001 convention.

He was the recipient of two Everett Helm Research Fellowships at the Lily Library at Indiana University in Bloomington for his research on Gordon Lish, Raymond Carver, and William T. Vollmann. Hemmingson wrote multiple auto-ethnography articles for Forum: Qualitative Research.

== Influences ==
Hemmingson acknowledged as influences Harlan Ellison, Raymond Carver, Gordon Lish, and William Vollmann for literature in addition to Wim Wenders, David Lynch, David Mamet, and Stanley Kubrick for film. Hemmingson was called "Raymond Carver on acid" by literary guru Larry McCaffery and "a disciple of a quick and dirty literature" by the American Book Review.

== Theater ==
From 1995 to 2000, he was the literary manager of The Fritz Theater in San Diego, where he directed, produced, and wrote many plays as well as for his own company, The Alien Stage Project, which continues to produce theater in San Diego and Los Angeles. His full-length play, Driving Somewhere, won the 1997 Ventana New Play Award in San Francisco. It was first produced in 1995 by The Fritz Theater.

His one-act play, Iraq, was produced in the 2000 Samuel French, Inc. One-Act Play Festival in Manhattan, New York. His one-act, Milk, has been widely produced and is published in the book, The Art of the One-Act. It has been produced in Seattle, Los Angeles, New York City, and San Diego. His full-length play, Erotic Scenes in a Cheap Motel Room, has been produced by dozens of theaters and is available as a radio drama from Walcott & Sheridan Audio Library. Its debut was on March 11 at the Fritz Theatre.

Fritz Theater original productions include: Driving Somewhere, Iraq, Bosnia, and Erotic Scenes in Cheap Motel Room. Alien Stage Project original productions were Erotic Scenes in a Cheap Motel Room and Milk. Actor's Alliance Play Festival original productions were Milk, NASDAQ, The Aliens, Happiness. Compass Theater (in San Diego) and the production of full-length, Stations in summer 2009. Stations was directed by David Meredith and performed at the Resilience of the Spirit Festival.

== Independent scholarship ==
As an independent scholar, Hemmingson focused his studies on Raymond Carver and William T. Vollmann, and the methodologies of critifiction and autoethnography. He published extensively in these areas of study, as well as critical monographs on Star Trek, Barry N. Malzberg, Charles Bukowski, blogging and micro-blogging.

In 2009, at the National Communication Association convention in Chicago, the Carl Couch Center awarded Hemmingson the Norman K. Denzin Qualitative Research Award for his paper about auto/ethnography, "Fragments of my Grandmothers."

== Radio ==
From April 2012 until his death, Hemmingson hosted the show The Art of Dreaming on Revolution Radio at freedomslips.com.

== Bibliography ==
=== Anthologies (edited) ===
- Expelled from, Eden: A William T. Vollmann Reader New York, co-edited with Larry McCaffery: (Thunder's Mouth Press, 2004) ISBN 1-56025-441-6
- The Mammoth Book of Legal Thrillers, New York City: (Carroll & Graf in Manhattan, New York, 2001) ISBN 0-7867-0713-5
- The Mammoth Book of Short Erotic Novels New York City: Co-edited with Maxim Jakubowski (Carroll & Graf, 2000) ISBN 0-7867-0713-5
- What The Fuck: The Avant-Porn Anthology, Manhattan: (Soft Skull Press, 2000) ISBN 1-887128-61-1

=== Novels ===
- Time Lust Manhattan: (Tor Books, 2014)
- Judas Payne: A Weird Western / Webb's Weird Wild West: Western Tales of Horror (double book with Don Webb, Wildside Press in Cabin John, Maryland, 2010) ISBN 1-4344-1194-X
- Hard Cold Whisper, Rockville, Maryland: (Black Mask Books, 2010) ISBN 978-1608726189
- The Trouble with Tramps: An Orrie Hitt Homage, Rockville: (Black Mask Books, 2010) ISBN 1-59654-859-2
- Shabbytown, Rockville: (Black Mask Books, 2009) ISBN 1-59654-869-X
- The Yacht People (The Borgo Press, 2009) ISBN 1-4344-7765-7
- In the Background is a Walled City, San Bernardino, California: (The Borgo Press, 2008) ISBN 1-4344-0242-8
- Wild Turkey (Forge Books, 2001) ISBN 9780312878726
- The Naughty Yard, San Francisco: (Permeable Press, 1994) ISBN 1-882633-02-4 reprinted in The Mammoth Book of International Erotica (Carroll & Graf, 1996) ISBN 0-7867-0373-3

=== Fiction collections ===
- Poison from a Dead Sun/The Chronotope (Wildside Press, 2012) (Novel + collected science fiction stories)
- Vivacious Vixens and Blackmail Babes (Wildside Press/Borgo Press, 2012) (Novel + 4 crime noir stories)
- This Other Eden: Three Novellas and Three Stories, Brooklyn, New York: (The Dybbuk Press, 2010) ISBN 0-9766546-6-0
- Pictures of Houses with Water Damage, New York City (at the time of publishing was in upstate New York): (Black Lawrence Press, 2010)
- Desperate Women, Rockville: (The New Traveller's Companion/Olympia Press (in Paris), 2010) ISBN 1-59654-831-2
- How to Have an Affair and Other Instructions. San Bernardino, California: (The Borgo Press, 2007)
- Seven Women and Other Stories, New York City: (Venus Book Club, 2002) ISBN 0-7394-2171-9
- My Dream Date with Kathy Acker, Portland, Oregon: (Eraserhead Press, 2002)
- Snuff Flique, Denver: (CyberPsychos AOD, 1997) ISBN 1-886988-04-8
- Nice Little Stories Jam-Packed with Depraved Sex & Violence, Denver: (CyberPsychos AOD, 1995) ISBN 1-886988-00-5

=== Poetry collections ===
- Ourselves or Nothing, Rockville: (The New Traveller's Companion/Olympia Press, 2010) ISBN 1-59654-860-6
- Rwanda (Yellow Bat Press, 2003)
- Moving in on the Conservatives, Detroit: (Planet Detroit Press, 1995)
- Reaching Into the Wet Darkness, Stow, Ohio: (Impetus Press, 1986)
- Nowhere is Safe (Samizdat Press, 1985)

=== Plays ===
- Milk, Kalamazoo, Michigan: (New Issues in Poetry and Prose, 2007)
- Driving Somewhere San Francisco: (Vantana Productions, 1997)

=== Literary criticism ===
- Women in the Short Fiction of Raymond Carver, Jefferson, North Carolina: (McFarland & Company, 2014)
- William T. Vollmann: An Annotated Bibliography, Lanham, Maryland: (Scarecrow Press, 2012)
- Gordon Lish and His Influence on Twentieth Century American Literature, New York City (Turtle Bay, Manhattan) and London: Routledge, 2013)
- William T. Vollmann: A Critical Study and Seven Interviews, Jackson, North Carolina: (McFarland & Company, 2009) ISBN 0-7864-4025-2
- The Dirty Realism Duo: Charles Bukowski and Raymond Carver on the Aesthetics of the Ugly, San Bernardino (The Borgo Press, 2008, The Milford Series: Popular Writers of Today No. 70) ISBN 1-4344-0257-6

=== Anthologies (in which he appeared) ===
- Morbid Curiosity Cures the Blues (Simon & Schuster, 2009) ISBN 1-4391-2466-3
- The Urban Bizarre (Wildside Press LLC, 2004) ISBN 1-930997-40-X
- The Mammoth Book of Erotica (Carroll & Graf, 2000) ISBN 0-7867-0787-9

== Reviews ==
- Wild Turkey review by Tim W. Brown
- 5 reviews of Nice Little Stories Jam-Packed With Depraved Sex & Violence
