= Sukenick =

Sukenick is a surname. Notable people with the surname include:

- Lynn Sukenick (1938 – 1995), American poet
- Ronald Sukenick (1932 – 2004), American writer and literary theorist
