= The Love Cats =

The Love Cats may refer to:

- "The Love Cats" (song), a 1983 song by The Cure
- The Love Cats (film), a 2012 American drama film
- The Lovecats, a project of Peruvian musician Pelo Madueño
