= Northgate High School (Walnut Creek, California) =

Location
- 425 Castle Rock Road; Walnut Creek, California 94598; United States; 37°54′28″N 122°00′30″W

Information
- Type: Public
- Established: 1974
- School district: Mt. Diablo Unified School District
- Superintendent: Adam Clark
- Principal: Kelly Cooper
- Teaching staff: 65.37 (FTE)
- Grades: 9–12
- Enrollment: 1,600
- Student to teacher ratio: 23.48
- Colors: Crimson and Gold
- Athletics: Diablo Athletic League (DAL)
- Mascot: Broncos
- Newspaper: The Sentinel
- Feeder schools: Foothill Middle School
- Website: northgate.mdusd.org

Northgate High School (NHS) is a public high school located in the suburban Northgate neighborhood of Walnut Creek, California, United States. The most recent of five high schools in the Mount Diablo Unified School District, the school was built in 1974, and is home to approximately 1,500 students from Walnut Creek and Concord, California, grades 9–12. Its name derives from its location at the north entrance of Mount Diablo State Park.

== History ==
Northgate High School opened in 1974 to relieve pressure on neighboring Ygnacio Valley High School in Concord. Students were gradually phased in; the school graduated its first class in 1976. Northgate was the last high school to be built in the Mt. Diablo Unified School District.

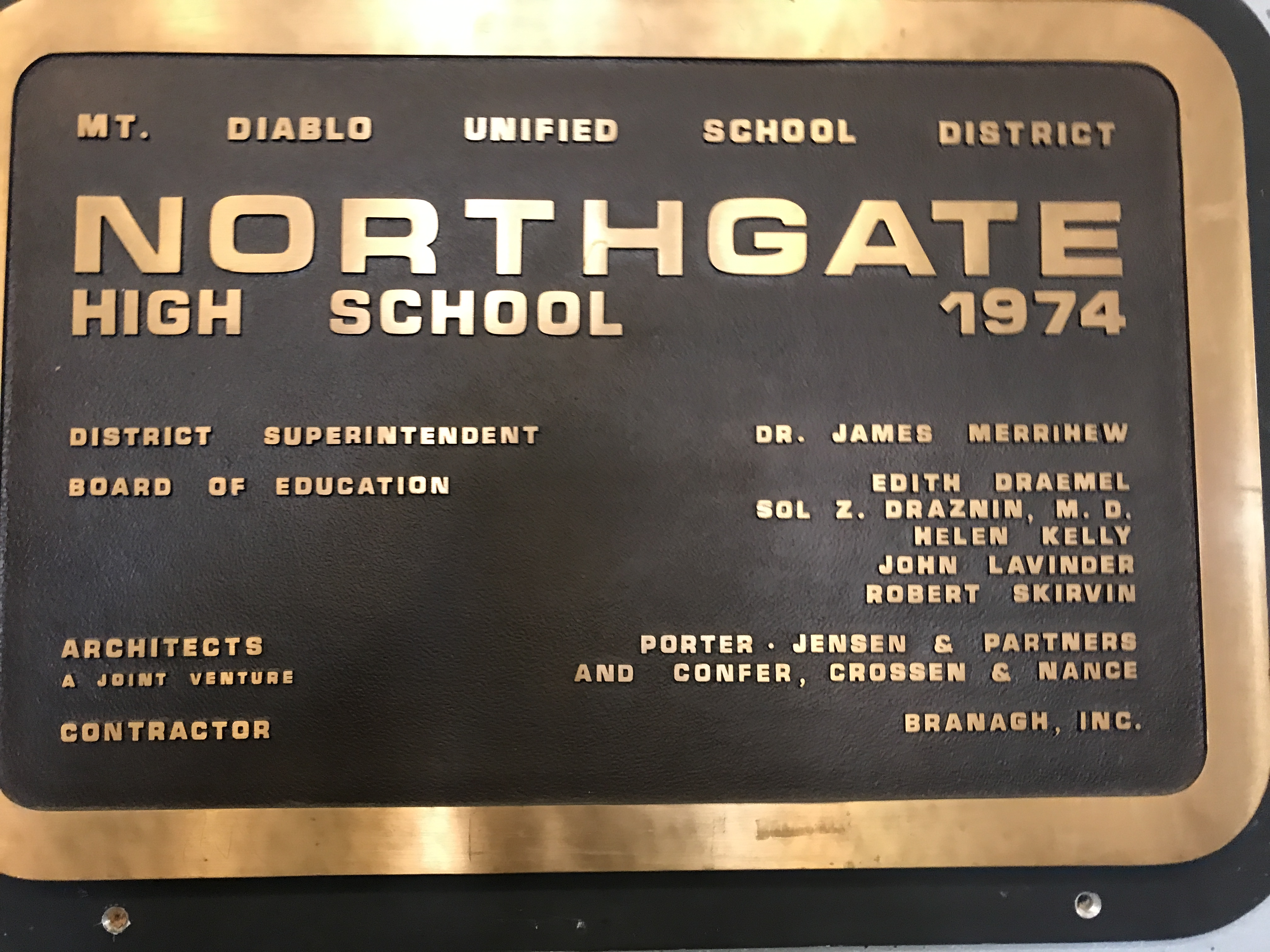
Plaque inside Northgate main entrance

In September 1978, the school hosted a debate on Proposition 6, a state proposition which would have made it mandatory for school boards to fire openly gay and lesbian teachers. The debate was between the proposition's sponsor, John Briggs, and San Francisco supervisor Harvey Milk. It was the last debate that Milk participated in before he was assassinated.

In December 2007, a petition was made to move Northgate to the Acalanes Union High School District. The Mt. Diablo school district board and the Contra Costa County Office of Education both denied the petition.

In 2016, a group named Northgate CAPS (Community Advocacy for our Public Schools) began a new campaign to separate Northgate High and its feeder elementary and middle schools into a new, separate school district. On May 2–3, 2017, the Contra Costa County Board of Education held public meetings on the petition. The county board recommended against the proposal; the state board of education could still take up the proposal but has not done so as of July 2018.

== Academics ==
Northgate High School was named a distinguished school in 2007. The school employs 60 certified teachers. 21 Advanced Placement courses are offered in fields including science, math, English, foreign language, social science, and art. Approximately 97% of graduates attend four-year or two-year colleges and universities. The school had a 94% graduation rate in 2010–2011.

Unlike some other schools in the Mt. Diablo district, Northgate does not have any formal academies.

The course catalog offers several sets of suggested courses for students with a specific interest, but these are not planned collaboratively; they include sequences in communications, environmental studies, animation, and engineering. Every senior must participate in a Mock Congress during the fall and must present a Senior Project at the end of the school year.

== Extracurricular activities ==
=== Athletics ===
The Northgate High School Athletic Department oversees 2 competitive varsity athletic teams that compete in the Diablo Valley Athletic League (in the North Coast Section of the California Interscholastic Federation). Northgate's sports include football, cheerleading, basketball, softball, baseball, soccer, volleyball, cross country, golf, lacrosse, swimming, tennis, track and field, softball, water polo, and wrestling. Northgate's Boy's Volleyball team won the Division I CIF Northern California Championship in 2026. During the 2013-14 year, the school broke ground on a new center to provide a pool for the aquatics teams and facilities for the school's sports medicine program. The aquatics facilities were completed in 2015 and are now used for water polo and swim team practices and meets.

The annual football game between Northgate and its cross-town rival Las Lomas High School is nicknamed "The Battle of the Creek" after Walnut Creek, California.

=== Performing arts ===
All Northgate performing arts programs operate chiefly out of the Jack De Rieux Little Theatre, which was remodeled and enlarged in 2006.

The instrumental music program consists of a Concert Band, Symphonic Band, Wind Ensemble, two Jazz Bands, Orchestra, and Marching band (all are regular courses except the extracurricular marching band). Concert band is the entry-level band consisting of only 9th grade students. Symphonic Band is the largest instrumental music group, typically consisting of 10th, 11th, and 12th grade members. Orchestra is a string orchestra that consists of students from all grades; the prerequisite is previous experience with private teachers or Orchestra in middle school. The audition process for Wind Ensemble, Jazz Band I, and Jazz Band II, the three most advanced bands, is competitive in nature due to a high number of talented students vying for a small number of spaces. In addition to concerts on campus, each spring the jazz ensembles usually hold a concert at Yoshi's nightclub in Oakland. All the other groups perform together at the Dean Lesher Regional Center for the Arts in downtown Walnut Creek. Jazz I won the "Next Generation Jazz Festival" portion of the Monterey Jazz Festival in five consecutive years (2014–2018), a record for that competition.

The choir program consists of several groups: the entry-level Concert Choir, which does not require an audition, Cantiamo (Level 2 Women's Choir), Il Coro (Level 2 Men's Choir), Bella Voce (Level 3 Women's Choir) and Madrigals (Level 3 Co-ed Choir). In order to be a part of Cantiamo or Il Coro, students must choose a song to audition with. To get into Bella Voce or Madrigals, any prospective member must have first spent at least one year in Il Coro or Cantiamo (some exceptions have been made in the past), and audition with a song of their choice and a selected choir piece. Cantiamo members trying out will decide whether they are trying out for Madrigals, Bella Voce, or both.

Madrigals have a heavy winter schedule, as they do holiday gigs for restaurants and families that hire them. This fundraising activity has been in place since the late 1970s and occupies most of December for the members. Bella Voce performs a variety of gigs throughout the year as well. The funds from these activities support the students' spring tour. Bella Voce, Madrigals, Cantiamo, Il Coro and the Instrumental Music program all go to Disneyland in the spring to perform and participate in the musical programs that are held for high schools and other performing arts groups. This event is called "Disney Performing Arts" (formerly known as "Magic Music Days").

The drama program consists of three levels, the last being Production Workshop which produces at least one play per semester. Students have the opportunity to try working with all aspects of theater, including stage lighting, sound design, promotions, scenic design, props (theatrical property), and stage management. Northgate also participates in the Devil Mountain Improv League, a completely student-created and student-run coalition of competitive high school improvisational theater students that has been around since 1996.

== Architecture ==
Northgate High School has received both acclaim and criticism for its brutalist architecture. The school is built into the side of a hill on Castle Rock Road, at the foothills of Mt. Diablo. The fact that the school's architect had designed some prisons during his career has led to a rumor that the school was first built as a prison.

When the school was originally constructed, none of the classrooms had permanent walls; rather, they had half-high walls that could be moved to make more room if needed. Classrooms were later retrofitted with walls because the concept was considered a fire hazard. Movable walls in classrooms were replaced by full-height walls. The school closed for many months after the Loma Prieta Earthquake due to the discovery of asbestos. During the 1990–91 school year, portable classrooms were used on the school grounds and the former Castle Rock Elementary grounds.

The library sits in the main forum of the school and remains one of the only areas with five-foot walls, making the library very open, and is in clear view of the office on the second floor. In the center of the school is a small atrium, which has been variously used as a lounge area or as a native-plant garden with plants, a small pond, and even turtles.

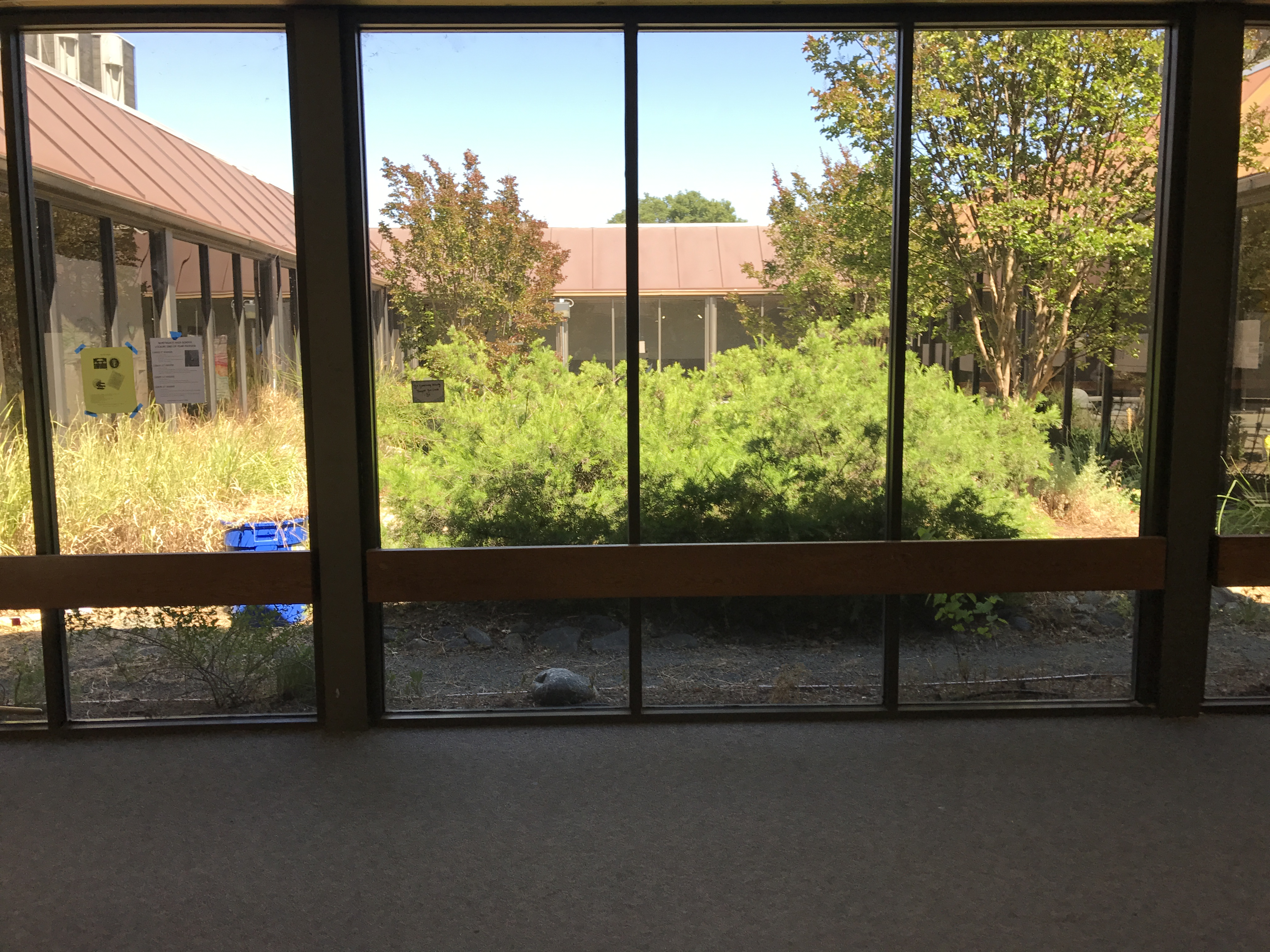
Northgate High School "atrium"

== In popular culture ==
The movie The Principal was partially filmed at Northgate High School. Northgate was chosen as a location for its partial-wall "open environment" classroom design, representing an easy teaching job at a "nice school" for the character Rick Latimer (James Belushi). After getting into trouble he is transferred to a tough school in Oakland, California.

== Notable alumni and staff ==
- Stef Burns/Steph Birnbaum (1977): rock guitarist
- Keith Clearwater (1977): professional golfer
- Peter Richardson (writer) (1977): author
- Lee Goldberg (1980): television writer/producer (Diagnosis Murder, Nero Wolfe) and novelist (Monk, The Walk)
- Cathy Podewell (1982): actress
- Kristen Babb-Sprague (1986): Olympic swimmer
- Doug Davis (1993): starting pitcher for the Arizona Diamondbacks
- Yul Kwon (1993): winner of the reality television show Survivor: Cook Islands
- Tammy Cleland (1993): Olympic champion and Olympic coach
- Ari Wallach (1993): American futurist and author
- Eva Marie (2002): fashion model, actress, valet, and professional wrestler
- The Story So Far (band): pop punk band

== Gallery ==
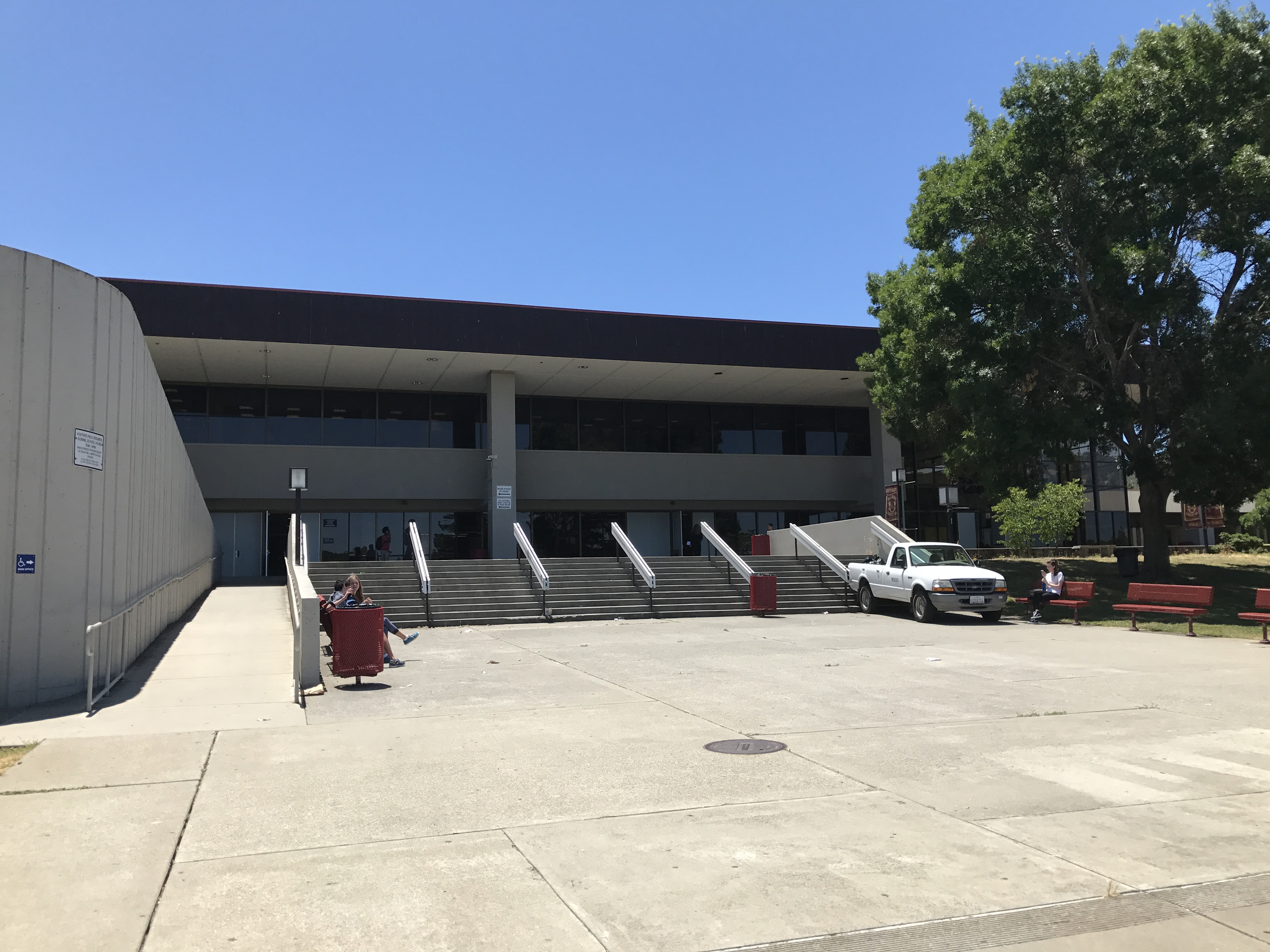
Northgate High School, main entrance

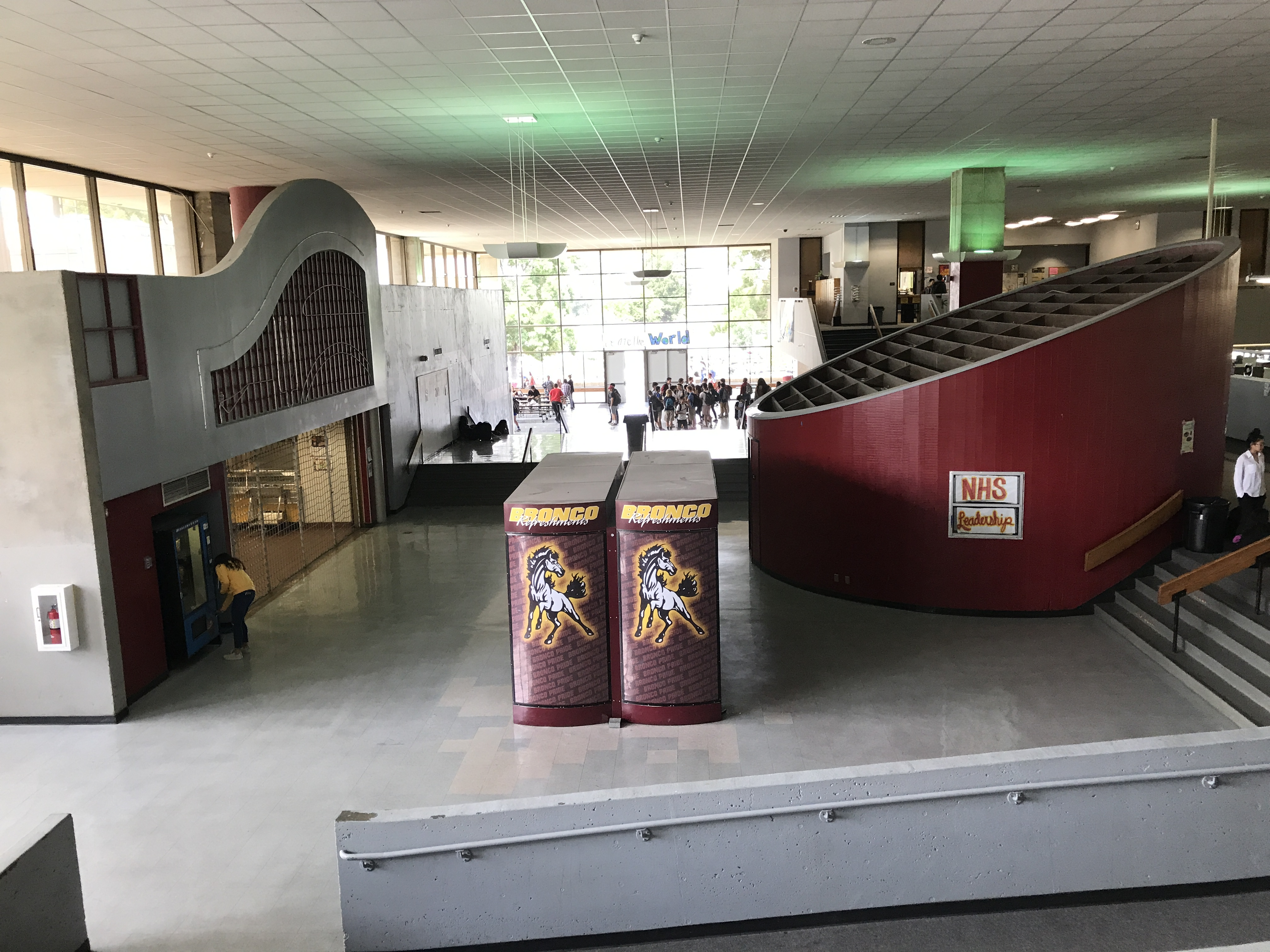
"Forum" meeting space, with main entrance at rear and cafeteria at left, viewed from mezzanine staff lounge

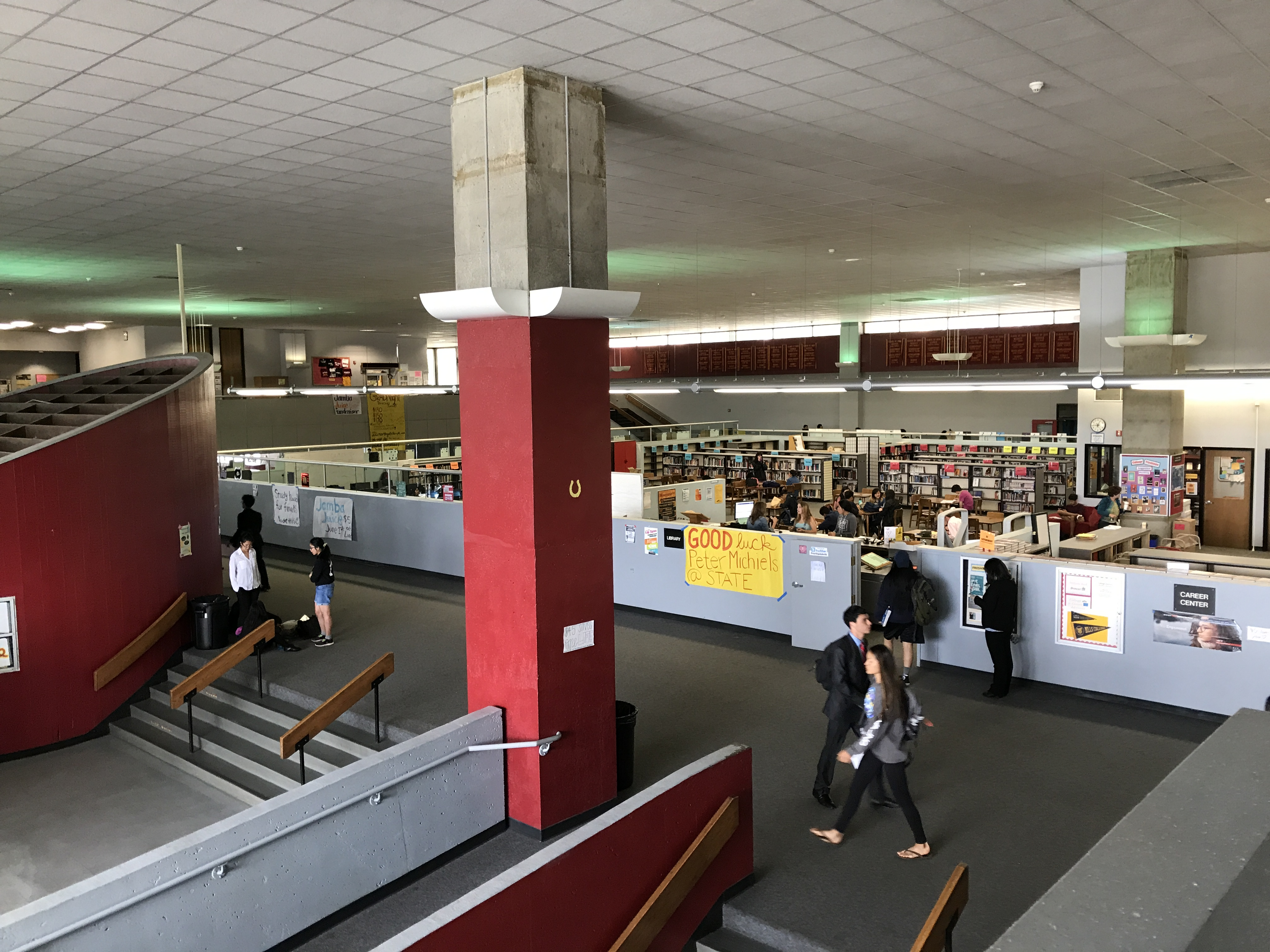
View of library and open area of main building, from mezzanine staff lounge

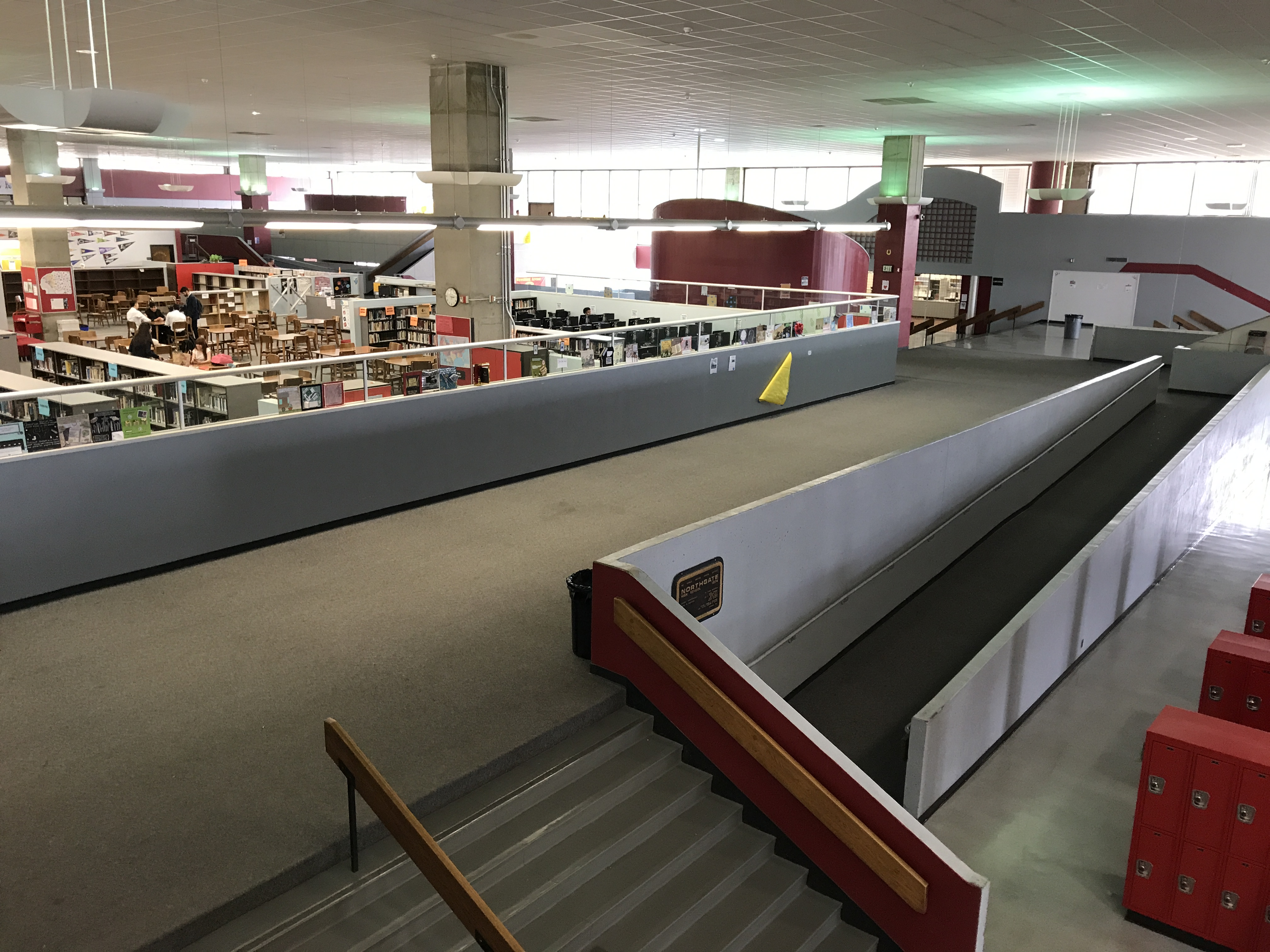
View of library from main office on mezzanine level

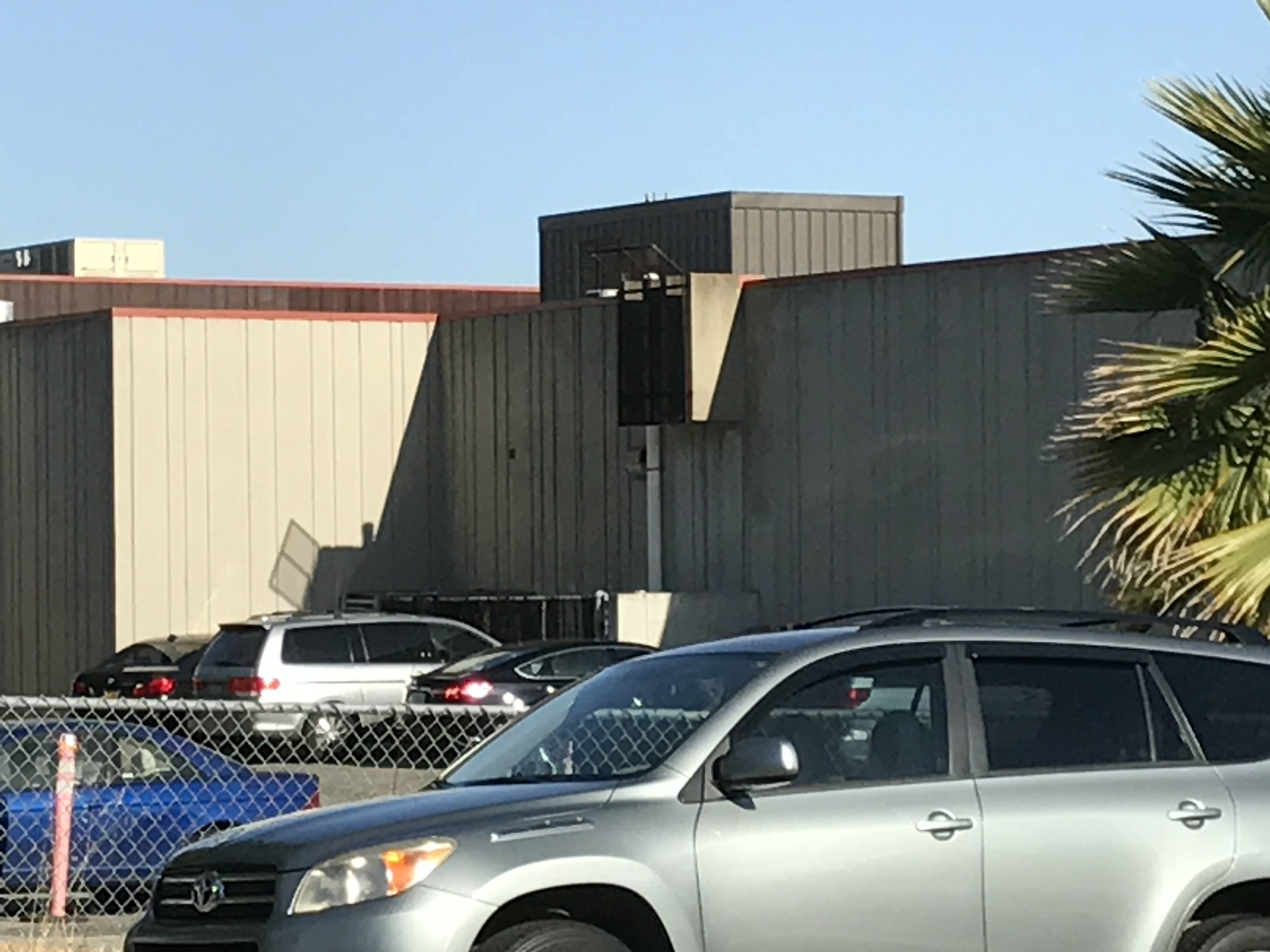
East side (Castle Rock Rd.), showing windowless concrete construction that is typical of the campus

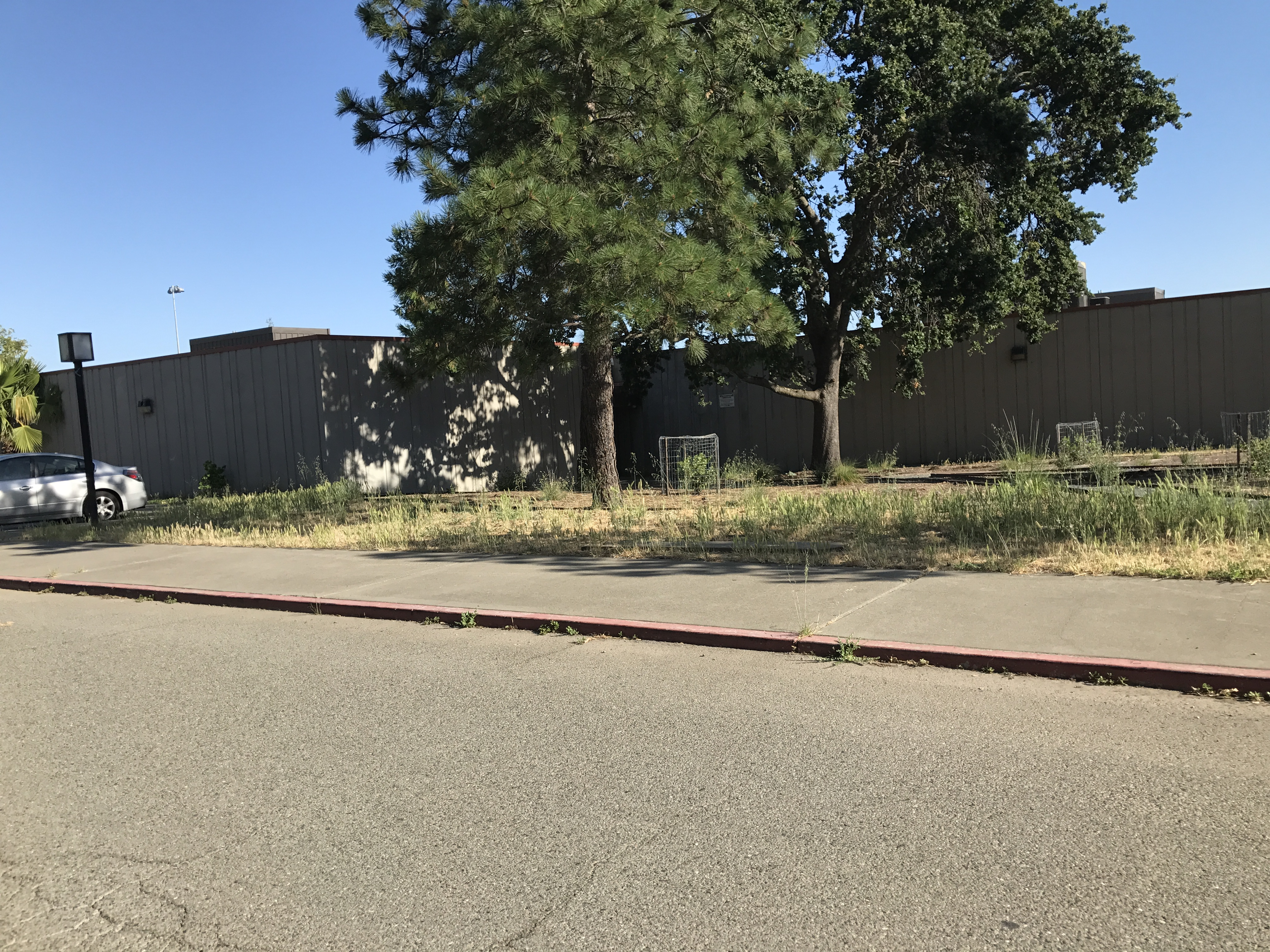
Southeast corner

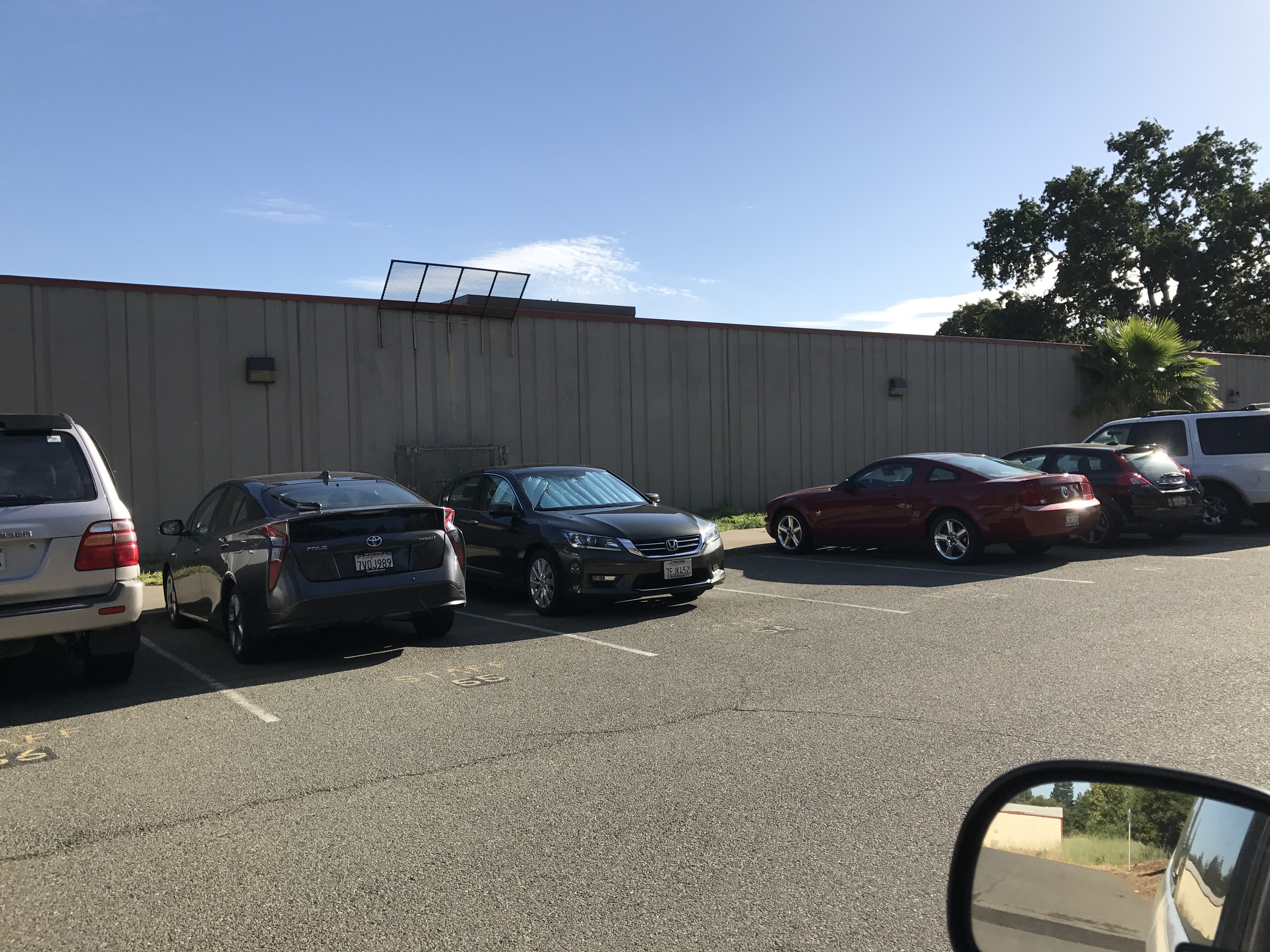
South side
