= Jonathan Baumbach =

American author, academic, and film critic (1933–2019)

- Born: July 5, 1933; New York City, U.S.
- Died: March 28, 2019 (aged 85); Great Barrington, Massachusetts, U.S.
- Education: Brooklyn College (BA); Columbia University (MFA); Stanford University (PhD)
- Occupations: Novelist, film critic
- Spouse(s): Naomi Miller (annulled); Ellie Berkman (divorced); Georgia Brown (divorced); Annette Grant
- Children: 4, including Noah

Jonathan Baumbach (July 5, 1933 – March 28, 2019) was an American author, academic and film critic.

== Life and career ==
Baumbach was born to a Jewish family in Brooklyn, the son of Ida Helen (née Zackheim), a teacher, and Harold M. Baumbach, a painter and academic. His father's disdain for earning tenure at the University of Iowa and various other schools resulted in him moving every year for the first six years of Jonathan's life "looking for a new place to paint."

He received a B.A. in English from Brooklyn College in 1955. Baumbach also earned an M.F.A. in playwriting from Columbia University in 1956 and a Ph.D. in English from Stanford University in 1961. Following two years of service in the United States Army, from 1956 to 1958, he was an instructor of English at Stanford (1958–1960) before holding assistant professorships at Ohio State University (1961–1964) and New York University (1964–1966). He returned to Brooklyn College as an associate professor in 1966 and was promoted to full professor in 1969. From 1975 to 2001, he was director of the college's M.F.A. fiction program. He also held visiting professorships at the University of Washington (1979–1980), Princeton University (1990–1991) and Brown University (1994). During the late 1950s, he was a contributor to Film Culture magazine before publishing two novels and a monograph on American fiction in the 1960s.

Having had his third novel rejected 32 times, he and Peter Spielberg founded the author-run publishing house Fiction Collective in 1974; one of the first titles published was Baumbach's Reruns. Later reorganized as FC2, the collective has since published many emerging writers (including Russell Banks and Mark Leyner) and does so currently through the University of Alabama Press. Although he remained a board member, Baumbach's own involvement as writer with FC2 finished when the collective rejected his novel B in 2002; it was ultimately published elsewhere. Following Reruns, he published nine additional novels, several collections of short fiction and his collected film criticism.

In the 1970s and early 1980s, Baumbach was film critic for Partisan Review. He twice chaired the National Society of Film Critics.

Baumbach was married four times: his first marriage, to, Naomi Miller, was brief and annulled; his second and third marriages, to Ellie Berkman and Georgia Brown, ended in divorce; his fourth marriage, to New York Times arts editor Annette Grant, ended when she died in February 2019. He has four children: David Baumbach, a photographer; Nina Baumbach; filmmaker Noah Baumbach (in two of whose films he had acting roles) and Nico Baumbach, partner of Pulitzer Prize-winning playwright Annie Baker and an assistant professor of film at Columbia University.

Baumbach died on March 28, 2019, at his home in Great Barrington, Massachusetts.

== Work ==
Preceded by his academic activity and on the heels of a critical study, 1965's The Landscape of Nightmare: Studies in the Contemporary American Novel, Baumbach's first novel, A Man to Conjure With, published the same year, "synthesizes various trends outlined in his critical study" and "has a protagonist who moves simultaneously backward and forward in time, carefully orchestrating revelations of plot and character so that the present is gradually understood in a plausible and convincing way. As a result, the narrative is assembled as a psychological collage." In the novels which followed, Baumbach has been said to be 'representative of a new style of novelist' alongside contemporaries Ronald Sukenick, Jerzy Kosinski, and William H. Gass while developing an experimental approach bearing comparison with surrealist and magical realist writers in their use of dream imagery. Baumbach himself has said "I'm not just using the dream in the traditional sense, in the psychological sense where it's an almost compacted parable, with special symbols. I'm just trying to find another way of getting at reality. I mean, my sense is that the conventional novel, for me, anyway, is on its way to a dead end. And I'm trying to get at the way things are in a way that no one has ever seen them before."

His second novel, What Comes Next, further explores the themes in his critical study and 'organizes itself as a literal landscape of nightmare, as all reference points for the character's reality are located within his own disjointed perceptions. His third novel, Reruns, "abandons plot and character entirely in favor of dream-like images from movies rerun page by page." In his fourth, Babble, Baumbach constructs his narrative from "the stories his infant son allegedly tells him."

Baumbach's work has been compared with the dreamlike filmic style of David Lynch and is often grouped with postmodernists like William Gaddis, Donald Barthelme and Robert Coover.

== Novels ==
- A Man to Conjure With (1965)
- What Comes Next (1968)
- Reruns (1974)
- Babble (1976)
- Chez Charlotte and Emily (1979)
- My Father, More or Less (1982)
- Separate Hours (1990)
- Seven Wives: A Romance (1994)
- D-Tours (1998)
- B, a novel (2002)
- YOU or the Invention of Memory (2007)
- Dreams of Molly (2011)

== Short fiction ==
- The Return of Service (1979)
- The Life and Times of Major Fiction (1987)
- On The Way To My Father's Funeral - New And Selected Stories (2004)
- The Pavilion of Former Wives (2016)

== Nonfiction ==
- The Landscape of Nightmare: Studies in the Contemporary American Novel (1965)
- Shots In The Dark: Collected Film Criticism (2017)
