= JoAnna Novak =

American writer

JoAnna Novak is an American writer. She is the author of several books, including the poetry collection Domestirexia, the memoir Contradiction Days, and the short story collection Meaningful Work. She is also the co-founder of Tammy, a literary magazine and chapbook publisher.

== Early life and education ==
Novak grew up in suburban Chicago. She has a bachelor's degree from Knox College in Creative Writing as well as an MFA in fiction from Washington University in St. Louis and an MFA in poetry from University of Massachusetts Amherst. She has listed "Annie Ernaux, Junot Díaz, Nathalie Léger, Karl Ove Knausgård, Ross Gay, Tommy Pico, George Eliot, Shirley Hazzard, Lydia Davis" as her influences, among others.

== Career ==
In 2009, Novak co-founded Tammy, a publication which runs a literary magazine and prints chapbooks, with Thomas Cook and Tyler Flynn Dorholt. She served as its founding editor. She has also taught at Mount Saint Mary College as an assistant professor of fiction, poetry, and creative nonfiction and worked as a writing coach for WriteByNight.

In 2017, Novak released her debut novel, titled I Must Have You, with Skyhorse Publishing. Among other things, the book concerns eating disorders and girlhood. One year later, in 2018, Novak published her debut poetry collection, Noirmania, with Inside the Castle.

In 2020, Novak published the poetry collection Abeyance, North America with After Hours Editions. One year later, in 2021, Novak published another poetry collection, New Life. The same year, she published Meaningful Work, a short story collection which won Fiction Collective Two's Ronald Sukenick Innovation Fiction Prize and was subsequently published by Fiction Collective 2.

In 2023, Novak published Contradiction Days, a memoir about Novak's own experiences as a mother which also addresses the life and work of Agnes Martin; it partly takes place in Taos, New Mexico, Martin's hometown, where Novak spent nearly three weeks in the middle of her pregnancy. The memoir was published by Catapult. She had written the first draft in 17 days and taken years to revise it. Kirkus Reviews called it a "lyrical memoir" and said that "the majority of the story pulses with honesty and vulnerability, spiraling to a satisfying ending."

In 2024, Novak published Domestirexia with Soft Skull Press. She had written many of its poems in 2020 and onward during the COVID-19 pandemic. Publishers Weekly lauded "Novak’s vivid language", stating "these pages overflow with life’s complexities, terrors, and fragmentations."

== Personal life ==
Novak has a husband and a son.
