= Marianne Hauser =

American journalist

Marianne Hauser (December 11, 1910 – June 21, 2006) was an Alsatian-American novelist, short story writer and journalist. She is best known for the novels Prince Ishmael (1963) about the foundling Kaspar Hauser and The Talking Room (1976), an experimental novel about a pregnant 13-year-old raised by lesbian parents. She was the recipient of a Rockefeller Grant and a National Endowment for the Arts grant.

== Early life ==
Marianne Hauser was born in Strasbourg, Alsace-Lorraine. Her mother, of French Huguenot descent, led a bohemian life and designed clothing before marrying her father, a German of Jewish descent, who worked as a chemical engineer and patent attorney. She had two older sisters, Dora and Eva. Dora died of meningitis in 1917, which Hauser would write about in her 1962 story Allons Enfant. Hauser was a difficult and mischievous child, raised during the First World War by her grandmother and a succession of governesses, while her mother ran the family business and her father worked in a German munitions plant.

The Hausers remained in Strasbourg until the 1920s when they moved to Berlin. Hauser hated the German education system, and was thrown out of high school. Eventually she enrolled in classes at the University of Berlin law school, but didn't complete a degree, preferring instead to study dance, anthropology and hang out with artists. She dreamed of traveling the world. In 1932, restless and horrified by the Nazis, Hauser married to escape Germany but soon abandoned her husband on Capri and moved to Paris where she began to write for newspapers. She wrote her first novel, Monique, in German. Monique, now lost, was published in 1934 in Zurich.

Hauser decided that becoming a travel writer was the best way to see the world and contacted Otto Kleiber, literary editor of the anti-fascist Swiss newspaper Basler National Zeitung, proposing that he send her to Asia to write travel articles. Despite her young age, he agreed to do so and in early 1934, she departed, traveling through China, Taiwan, Cambodia, Malaysia, Sri Lanka, India, Japan and Hawaii, writing a weekly 1200-word feuilleton. She traveled by third-class rail and ship, and met ordinary people, experiencing first-hand colonial racism. In her autobiographical writings she refers often to instances in her early life when she was made aware of racism, whether they occurred in British India, New York City or North Carolina. It is during this period that she learned the art of revision, spending days working on a 3 or 4 page manuscript. In India she was the guest of the Maharaja of a small province located on the Kathiawar peninsula, which became the setting of her second novel, Indisches Gaukelspiel (Shadow Play in India). She wrote the book in China, where she lived for a year, and completed it in Hawaii. Indisches Gaukelspiel was published in Leipzig by Zinnen Verlag. A French version was published in Paris by an underground press and is now lost. In 1937 she returned to Paris via the US, and Kleiber, impressed by her American reporting, sent her back to New York. However, she soon cut her ties to Europe and set about learning English by talking to strangers on the street and reading widely.

== Career ==
In the late 1930s and early 1940, she made numerous connections in the New York publishing world and worked as a regular book reviewer for The New York Times, The New York Herald Tribune, The Saturday Review of Literature and The New Republic, and wrote feature articles for Travel Magazine and Arts and Decoration. She also lectured about the threat of Nazism.

Encouraged by her friend and Travel editor Coby Gilman Hauser began work on her first English-language novel, Dark Dominion (1947) based on her romantic relationship with a psychiatrist. It is narrated by the brother of a woman married to a New York psychiatrist who cannot dream. It was published by Random House and was reviewed by major newspapers and magazines, including The New York Times, The New Yorker, Harper's Magazine, The Chicago Tribune, and The Partisan Review. In a review article for Vogue Magazine, Marguerite Young wrote, “Marianne Hauser’s imagination is cosmopolitan, civilized, critical. Her tale is told with figures of speech like formal designs on old tapestries, deranged but formal images.”

In 1944, she married Fred Kirchberger, a German Jewish émigré who trained as a concert pianist in Berlin and then the Juilliard School of Music in New York. Their son, Michael Kirchberger, was born in Harlem in 1945. Fred Kirchberger joined the United States Army as soon as war broke out and during World War II Hauser traveled through the American south as Kirchberger was stationed at different military bases. In 1948 they moved to North Carolina, where Kirchberger taught at Bennett College, an historically black women's college. Fred Kirchberger earned his PhD at the University of Florida in Tallahassee and they moved again, this time to Kirksville, Missouri, where Fred was a professor of music at the Northeast Missouri State College.

Throughout these travels Hauser wrote. She published short stories in Mademoiselle, Harper's Bazaar, where Alice S. Morris, her lifelong friend, champion and frequent editor, was fiction editor, Botteghe Oscure and The Tiger's Eye, a literary and arts journal published by another lifelong friend, Ruth Stephan, where Marguerite Young was the fiction editor. The Mouse (The Tiger's Eye, 1949) was selected for Best American Short Stories, 1950. While in Kirksville she completed two novels, The Choir Invisible (1957), published first in England as the Living Shall Praise Thee, and Prince Ishmael (1963). In a review, Guy Davenport wrote, "With a richness and color wholly alien to the novel in America, Marianne Hauser constructs a myth close to music in its power to move the reader from one dazzling passage to the next…"

In the late fifties through the early sixties Hauser divided her time between New York and Kirksville, and was friends with a group of women authors living in the West Village, Marguerite Young, Ruth Stephan, Anais Nin and Mari Sandoz.

In 1964, the University of Texas Press published her short story collection, A Lesson in Music. It would be her last book with a mainstream publisher.

In 1966, Hauser divorced Fred Kirchberger and moved to New York City permanently. The two remained close friends for the rest of their lives, traveling frequently together. Her first apartment was on Christopher Street, and that experience served as the basis for her next and most important novel, The Talking Room, published in 1976 by the Fiction Collective. In a review, Larry McCaffery wrote, "The beauty and magic….would seem to be in the book’s extraordinary prose patterns, which create in their complex, interrelated images a sustained vision of loneliness, the desire for love and the necessity for escape, and, always, a dreamlike lyricism."

Hauser became an instructor in the Queens College English Department. Between 1966 and 1976, she underwent a noticeable change in style. Her writing from here forward is broadly satirical and absurd. Always attracted to radical politics, she was energized by the anti-war movement and credits her involvement with 1960s radical politics, as well as an increasing mastery of English, with that change in style.

Her next three books were published by Douglas Messerli's Sun and Moon Press: The Memoirs of the Late Mr. Ashley (1986), narrated by a bisexual dead man; Me and My Mom (1993), a short work dedicated to her old mentor Coby Gilman, about a daughter's difficult relationship with her mother, whom she forces into a nursing home; and a reprint of Prince Ishmael (1991). During this time she returned to publishing short stories, and was interviewed by Larry McCaffery.

In 2002, Hauser returned to the Fiction Collective, reconstituted as FC2, which published her last novel, Shootout With Father, again narrated by a gay man, an artist with a wealthy, overbearing and narcissistic father who collects armor. In 2004 she published her final work, The Collected Short Fiction of Marianne Hauser (2004) with an introduction in which she discusses, among other things, masturbation in old age. She died in 2006, at the age of 95. Her old friend, avant-garde author Raymond Federman, wrote a tribute to her on his blog, as did her former publisher Douglas Messerli. Hauser's papers are housed at the University of Florida, Gainesville. Her friends called her Bear.

== Works ==
=== Novels ===
- Monique (Ringier, 1934)
- Indisches Gaukelspiel (Zinnen, 1937)
- Dark Dominion (Random House, 1947)
- The Living Shall Praise Thee (Gollancz, 1957) aka The Choir Invisible (McDowell, Obolensky, 1958)
- Prince Ishmael (Stein and Day, 1963)
- The Talking Room (Fiction Collective, 1976)
- The Memoirs of the Late Mr. Ashley (Sun and Moon, 1986)
- Me and My Mom (Sun and Moon, 1993)
- Shootout with Father (FC2, 2002)

=== Short fiction ===
- A Lesson in Music (University of Texas, 1964)
- The Collected Short Fiction of Marianne Hauser (FC2, 2004)

=== Stories ===
Title	Publication	Collected in
"The Sheep"	Harper's Bazaar (May 1945)	A Lesson in Music
"The Cruel Brother"	Mademoiselle (October 1945)	A Lesson in Music
"A Lesson in Music"	Harper's Bazaar (May 1946)	A Lesson in Music
"The Colonel's Daughter"	The Tiger's Eye (March 1948)	-
"The Other Side of the River"	Mademoiselle (April 1948)	A Lesson in Music
"The Mouse"	The Tiger's Eye (June 1949)	A Lesson in Music
"The Rubber Doll"	Mademoiselle (1951)	-
"Darling of the Spirit World"	Harper's Bazaar (December 1952)	from Prince Ishmael
"The Sun and the Colonel's Button"	Botteghe Oscure 12 (Fall 1953)	from Prince Ishmael
"The Living Shall Praise Thee"	Harper's Bazaar (February 1955)	from The Choir Invisible
"Peter Plazke, Poet"	Perspective (Summer 1955)	A Lesson in Music
"The Choir Invisible"	Harper's Bazaar (December 1955)	from The Choir Invisible
"Wisdom's House"	Harper's Bazaar (February 1957)	from The Choir Invisible
"The Island"	Texas Quarterly (Winter 1959)	A Lesson in Music
"The Wounded Rose"	Harper's Bazaar (March 1960)	from Prince Ishmael
"The Dreaming Poseidon"	Harper's Bazaar (September 1961)	A Lesson in Music
"Allons Enfants"	Harper's Bazaar (August 1962)	A Lesson in Music
"My Feathered Love"	Harper's Bazaar (August 1963)	from Prince Ishmael
"The Abduction"	Harper's Bazaar (June 1964)	A Lesson in Music
"One Last Drop for Poor Abu"	A Lesson in Music (1964)	A Lesson in Music
"Mimoun of the Mellah"	Harper's Bazaar (December 1966)	Collected Short Fiction
"The Seersucker Suit"	Carleton Miscellany (Fall 1968)	Collected Short Fiction
"Ashes: A Fragment from a Novel in the Making"	Statements 2: New Fiction (1977)	Collected Short Fiction
"Weeds"	Denver Quarterly 18.2 (Summer 1983)	Collected Short Fiction
"Heaven 2"	Blatant Artifice 2 (1986)	Collected Short Fiction
"Heartlands Beat"	Fiction International 18.1 (Spring 1988)	Collected Short Fiction
"The Missing Page"	Witness 3.2/3 (1989)	Collected Short Fiction
"No Name on the Bullet"	Fiction International 19.2 (1991)	Collected Short Fiction
"Conflict of Legalities"	High Plains Literary Review	Collected Short Fiction
"It Isn't So Bad That It Couldn't Be Worse"	City 9 International Anthology	Collected Short Fiction
"My Uncle's Magic Machine"	Fiction International (Fall 2001)	Collected Short Fiction
"The Long & the Short: A Fable"	Collected Short Fiction (2004)	Collected Short Fiction

=== Nonfiction ===
- “The Indomitable Spirit of Alsace.” Travel 70 (1938): 28 – .
- “Swan Song of the Middle Ages.” Travel 72 (1939).
- “Pantomime in Blue and Silver.” Travel 72 (1938): 18 – .
- “Bamboo, Symbol of Old China.” Travel. 73 (July 1939): 30.
- “Successful Small Home That Suits the Environment.” Arts and Decoration 49 (February 1939): 18 – .
- “Home Industries of the Swiss Peasants.” Arts and Decoration 50 (April 1939): 22–40.
- “Marrakesh: Descent into Spring.” Harper's Bazaar, 3054 (May 1966): 188–203.
- “Mimoun of the Mellah.” Harper's Bazaar, 3061 (December 1966): 114–82.
- About My Life So Far in the Contemporary Author's Series, Volume 11, Gale (Detroit), 1990.
