= Peter Richardson =

Peter Richardson may refer to:

- Peter Richardson (American director), American documentary filmmaker
- Peter Richardson (engineer) (1935–2020), British biomedical engineer and academic
- Peter Richardson (British director) (born 1951), British actor, comedian, director and screenwriter
- Peter Richardson (cricketer) (1931–2017), British cricketer
- Peter Richardson (politician) (born 1939), former member of the Australian House of Representatives
- Peter Richardson (boxer) (born 1970), British boxer
- Peter Richardson (writer), American author of books about the counterculture of the 1960s and 1970s
- Pete Richardson (born 1946), American football defensive back
