= Peter Richardson (writer) =

American author (born 1959)

Peter Richardson (born 1959) is an American author, teacher, and editor whose work focuses on the San Francisco counterculture and political journalism. His publications include books about Rolling Stone magazine, Hunter S. Thompson, the Grateful Dead, Ramparts magazine, and Carey McWilliams.

== Life and Career ==
Richardson grew up in the San Francisco Bay Area and earned a Ph.D. in English from the University of California, Berkeley. After teaching medieval literature at the University of North Texas, he accepted an editorial position at the Public Policy Institute of California in 1999.

In 2005, Richardson became the founding editorial director at PoliPoint Press, where he acquired and developed books on progressive politics and current affairs. In that position, he edited Sasha Abramsky, Rose Aguilar, Dean Baker, Jeff Cohen, Marjorie Cohn, Joe Conason, Kevin Danaher, Belva Davis, Reese Erlich, Steven Hill, Phillip Longman, Markos Moulitsas, David Neiwert, Christine Pelosi, Sarah Posner, William Rivers Pitt, Nomi Prins, Norman Solomon, and Curtis White. One PoliPoint Press book, The Spy Who Tried to Stop a War, was the basis for Official Secrets, the 2019 film starring Keira Knightley.

In 2006, Richardson began teaching at San Francisco State University, where his courses focused on California culture. He retired from that position in 2023.

Richardson's biography of radical author and editor Carey McWilliams appeared in 2005. A Bomb in Every Issue, his 2009 book about Ramparts magazine, was an Editors' Choice at The New York Times. In 2018, Meagan Day summarized that book in a Jacobin magazine article called "When Ramparts Reigned."

Richardson's book about the Grateful Dead, which appeared in 2015, was an Editors' Pick at Amazon and a national bestseller. Savage Journey, his book about Hunter S. Thompson, appeared in 2022. He discussed that book on C-SPAN's Book TV with David Talbot and on CBS News with Nicole Killion. Richardson's book about the first decade of Rolling Stone magazine was published in 2026.

Richardson's articles have appeared in The Nation, The New Republic, the San Francisco Chronicle, the Los Angeles Times Book Review, and many scholarly journals. His cultural commentary has been featured in various newspapers and magazines in North America and abroad. He has been interviewed for various documentary films, television programs, radio shows, and podcasts.

In 2013, Richardson received the National Entertainment Journalism Award for Online Criticism. He has moderated panels on politics, history, music, and sports at the Bay Area Book Festival.

== Books ==
- Brand New Beat: The Wild Rise of Rolling Stone Magazine (University of California Press, 2026) ISBN 978-0-520-39939-6
- Savage Journey: Hunter S. Thompson and the Weird Road to Gonzo (University of California Press, 2022) ISBN 978-0-520-30492-5
- No Simple Highway: A Cultural History of the Grateful Dead (St. Martin's Press, 2015) ISBN 978-1-250-01062-9
- A Bomb in Every Issue: How the Short, Unruly Life of Ramparts Magazine Changed America (The New Press, 2009) ISBN 978-1-59558-439-7
- American Prophet: The Life and Work of Carey McWilliams (University of Michigan Press, 2005; University of California Press, 2019) ISBN 978-0-520-30429-1
