= Double or Nothing (novel) =

1971 novel by Raymond Federman

- First edition
- Author: Raymond Federman
- Cover artist: Dave LaFleur
- Language: English
- Genre: Novel
- Publisher: Swallow Press, 1971. University of Alabama Press, 1998. Fiction Collective Two, 1999.
- Publication date: 1971
- Publication place: United States
- Pages: 267 pp
- ISBN: 978-1-57366-075-4

Double or Nothing (1971) is a novel by Raymond Federman, originally published by Swallow Press, Chicago. It was the winner of the Frances Steloff Prize and The Panache Experimental Fiction Prize.

== Plot ==
Double or Nothing tells two tales intertwining at once: One of a struggling writer attempting to get a narrative to write about and the other of his narrative. The story is told through the protagonist who is the narrator of both stories.

Narrative A: Narrative A is of the narrator of this novel. It begins with the idea that the protagonist is going to lock himself into a room for a year with nothing other than food, toiletries and supplies. The idea is that this set imposed isolation will spark some creative flare within him and allow him to write his book. The narrative begins with him strategizing what products he will purchase and what he needs to survive in the room comfortably. The entire narrative focuses on him strategizing about his stay in the room, rather than thinking of the narrative and comes to the point where in the end, no complete draft of the book is created, but rather a strategy on how it could have been created.

Narrative B: Narrative B is the constructed narrative of our protagonist. It focuses on a Jewish man, moving into America and experiencing the different form of life. It details a rough sketch of what the narrator's novel should be. Narrative B changes as Double or Nothing proceeds, with elements of the plot changing until a blueprint of the result is created in the end. This narrative chronicles the adventures of Boris, whose name is later changed to Dominique through the actions of the main narrator. Dominique is traveling to America, meets a girl on the boat he is traveling on and falls in love with her. After this, he arrives at America where he is taken in by his Uncle David. He falls in love with an African - American woman on the subway and has sexual relations with her. At first he is distrusting and throughout his relationship, begins to gain trust in her quickly. The narrative ends on this note.
