= Marc Anthony Richardson =

American novelist

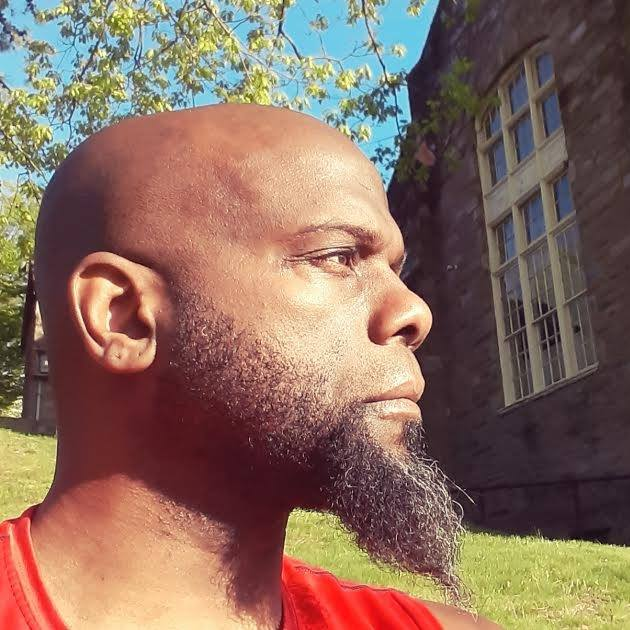
- Richardson in 2020
- Born: December 7, 1972 (age 53); Elkins Park, Pennsylvania
- Citizenship: United States
- Education: Antioch College, Mills College
- Writing career
- Genre: Experimental literature
- Notable work: Year of the Rat
- Notable awards: American Book Award, Creative Capital Award

Marc Anthony Richardson (born December 7, 1972) is an American novelist. He won an American Book Award and a Creative Capital Award.

== Life and work ==
Born in Elkins Park, Pennsylvania, Richardson was raised in the West Oak Lane section of Philadelphia by his mother, Betty Jean Richardson (née Williams), and his father, Malcolm Anthony Richardson. He is the youngest of their three sons. In 1991, he graduated from the Philadelphia High School for the Creative and Performing Arts (where he won awards for illustration), and went on to earn his BFA from Antioch College (where he studied with Martia Golden and was a finalist for the 1994 Hurston/Wright Award for College Writers). He earned his MFA from Mills College (where he studied with Micheline Aharonian Marcom and was a nominee for Best New American Voice 2010).

For over two decades, Richardson worked as a direct-care, social service counselor in day schools and group homes for disadvantaged youth in the Bay Area, in New York City group homes for adults with intellectual disabilities, and in Philadelphia public schools, exclusively as a therapeutic support counselor in low-income, African-American communities. Prior to Mills, he worked as an illustrator and a nude model. Though an exceptional freestyle dancer, he focused on art. He briefly studied classical drawing, painting, and printmaking at the Pennsylvania Academy of the Fine Arts on a partial scholarship, but returned to writing because of a lack of funding.

Year of the Rat, his debut novel, won the 2015 Ronald Sukenick Innovative Fiction Prize. In 2017, it was awarded an American Book Award from the Before Columbus Foundation, founded by Ishmael Reed. The ceremony took place at the San Francisco Jazz Center and was televised on C-SPAN.

Year of the Rat, a Künstlerroman, draws heavily from his personal experiences, as well as from those of his family members, past and present, delving into philosophical rants, poetry, social satire, and ribald, phantasmagoric language. Over the course of a decade, many of the incidents written in the book were freshly experienced by the author, such as his father's death and the near-death accounts of his mother and himself. Year of the Rat was published on his mother's 72nd birthday, the day of her successful heart surgery. Initially, one reviewer wrote that "the book is certainly unique in voice and style, but it’s also frightening, ugly, dense, and borderline offensive...it will make all but the most experimental of readers throw it across a room."

Messiahs, a speculative novel, fixes on an anonymous couple, an Asian American woman and an African American man. The man volunteered imprisonment on behalf of his wrongfully convicted nephew, yet―after over two years on death row―was "exonerated". In this dystopian society, proxies are allowed on death row in place of their convicted kin, as acts of holy reform. The initiative is based on the Passion of Christ. It was nominated as a fiction finalist for the 2021 Big Other Book Award.

Richardson was also a recipient of a PEN America grant, a Zora Neale Hurston/Richard Wright fellowship, an Art Omi residency, a Vermont Studio Center residency, and was an Andrew W. Mellon Scholar-in-residence at Rhodes University in Makhanda, South Africa. His work has appeared in Conjunctions, Callaloo, Black Warrior Review, Western Humanities Review, and the Anthology Who Will Speak for America? from Temple University Press He taught at the University of Pennsylvania,Rutgers University–New Brunswick, Stony Brook University, and the Center for Fiction.

In 2021, Richardson received a Creative Capital Award and a Sachs Program Grant for Arts Innovation for his work-in-progress, The Serpent Will Eat Whatever Is in the Belly of the Beast. Concerning the Creative Capital Award, Richardson stated: "This award supports the artists who work with no limitations in mind, no allegiances―whose diverse experiences require divergent formats." In 2024, he received an Artist Practitioner Fellowship from the Center for the Study of Race and Ethnicity in America (CSREA) at Brown University.

== Honors and awards ==
- 2015 Ronald Sukenick Innovative Fiction Prize
- 2017 American Book Award
- 2021 Creative Capital Award
- 2021 Sachs Program Grant for Arts Innovation
- "2022 Andrew W. Mellon Scholar-in-Residence at Rhodes University". english.upenn.edu.
- 2023 Art Omi: May Writers Cohort
- 2024 Center for the Study of Race and Ethnicity in America (CSREA) Practitioner Fellowship

== Publications ==
- —— (2016). Year of the Rat. Fiction Collective Two/University of Alabama Press. ISBN 9781573660570.
- —— (2021). Messiahs. Fiction Collective Two/University of Alabama Press. ISBN 9781573661904.
- The Serpent Will Eat Whatever Is in the Belly of the Beast (Dalkey Archive Press) forthcoming
