= Ronald Sukenick =

American writer

- Born: July 14, 1932; New York City, U.S.
- Died: July 22, 2004 (aged 72)
- Education: Midwood High School; Cornell University; Brandeis University (PhD)
- Occupations: Writer; literary theorist
- Spouse(s): Lynn Sukenick (divorced 1984) Julia Frey (m. 1992)

Ronald Sukenick (July 14, 1932 – July 22, 2004) was an American writer and literary theorist.

== Life ==
Sukenick was born and raised in Brooklyn, New York, where his father was a dentist. He graduated from Midwood High School and Cornell University before receiving his Ph.D. in English (with a dissertation on Wallace Stevens) from Brandeis University in 1962.

After Roland Barthes announced the "death of the author", Sukenick carried the metaphor even further in "the death of the novel". He drew up a list of what is missing: reality doesn't exist, nor time or personality. He was widely recognized as a controversial writer who, frequently humorously, questioned and rejected the conventions of traditional fiction-writing. In novels, short stories, literary criticism and history, he often used himself, family members or friends as characters, sometimes quoting them in tape-recorded conversations. He did stints as writer in residence at Cornell, the University of California, Irvine and the Hebrew University of Jerusalem. But his books were never best-sellers. Sukenick once commented that he had "only forty fans, but they're all fanatics."

He referred to his career as a university professor as his "day job". Beginning in 1956, he taught at Brandeis, Cornell, Hofstra University, the City College of New York, Sarah Lawrence College, the University at Buffalo and Paul Valéry University Montpellier 3. His most prolonged teaching stint was at the University of Colorado Boulder, where he was a professor of English from 1975 to 1999. While at Colorado, he served as director of creative writing until 1977 and as director of the publications center from 1986 to 1999.

He was actively committed to publishing and promoting the writing of other unconventional writers. He was founder and publisher of the American Book Review and a founder of The Fiction Collective (now Fiction Collective Two). Sukenick was chairman of the Coordinating Council of Little magazines, and on the executive council of the Modern Language Association and the National Book Critics Circle.

His archive resides at the Harry Ransom Center at the University of Texas at Austin.

== Family ==
He was divorced from Lynn Luria (Lynn Sukenick) in 1984. He lived with Julia Frey for many years, and they were formally married in 1992. Her book on Toulouse-Lautrec is now a standard work. She collaborated on Sukenick's posthumously published story "For the Invisible, Against Thinking" set in Bali.

He died from the muscular disease inclusion body myositis, in 2004.

== Works ==
- A Wallace Stevens Handbook. Brandeis University. 1962.
- Wallace Stevens: Musing the Obscure. New York University Press. 1967.
- Up (novel). FC2. 1999 [Originally printed 1968]. ISBN 978-1-57366-045-7.
- Death of the Novel and Other Stories (short story collection). FC2. 2003 [Originally printed 1969]. ISBN 978-1-57366-105-8.
- Out: A Novel (novel). Swallow Press. 1973. ISBN 978-0-8040-0630-9.
- 98.6 (novel). FC2. 1975. ISBN 978-0-914590-09-5.
- Long Talking, Bad Conditions, Blues (novella). FC2. 1978. ISBN 978-0-914590-60-6.
- In Form : Digressions on the Act of Fiction (1985)
- Blown Away (novel). Sun & Moon Press. 1986. ISBN 978-0-940650-65-7.
- The Endless Short Story (short story collection). FC2. 1986. ISBN 978-0-914590-95-8.
- Down and In - Life in the Underground: Bohemian to Hip to Beat to Rock and Punk - Mutiny in American Culture. Beech Tree Books. 1987. ISBN 978-0-688-06589-8. autobiography
- Doggy Bag: A Collection of Stories (short story collection). FC2. 1994. ISBN 978-0-932511-82-9.
- Degenerative Prose: Writing Beyond Category (1995) editor with Mark Amerika
- In the Slipstream : An FC2 Reader (1999) editor with Curtis White
- Mosaic Man (novel). FC2. 1999. ISBN 978-1-57366-079-2.
- Narralogues: Truth in Fiction. State University of New York Press. 2000. ISBN 978-0-7914-4400-9.
- Cows (novel). Alt-X Digital Arts Foundation. 2001. ISBN 978-1-931560-10-8.
- Moving Ahead
- Last Fall (novel). FC2. 2005. ISBN 978-1-57366-123-2.
- Charles Blackstone, Jill Talbot, ed. (2007). "For the Invisible, Against Thinking". The Art of Friction: Where (Non) Fictions Meet. The University of Texas Press. ISBN 978-0-292-71891-3.

== Criticism ==
- Matthew Roberson (2003). Musing the mosaic: approaches to Ronald Sukenick. State University of New York Press. ISBN 978-0-7914-5728-3.
- Jerzy Kutnik (1986). The Novel as Performance: The Fiction of Ronald Sukenick and Raymond Federman. Southern Illinois University Press, Carbondale, IL. ISBN 0-8093-1249-2. Archived from the original on 2012-10-18 – via Questia.

== See also ==
- Balcony View - a 9/11 Diary, by Julia Frey
