= Charles Blackstone =

American writer

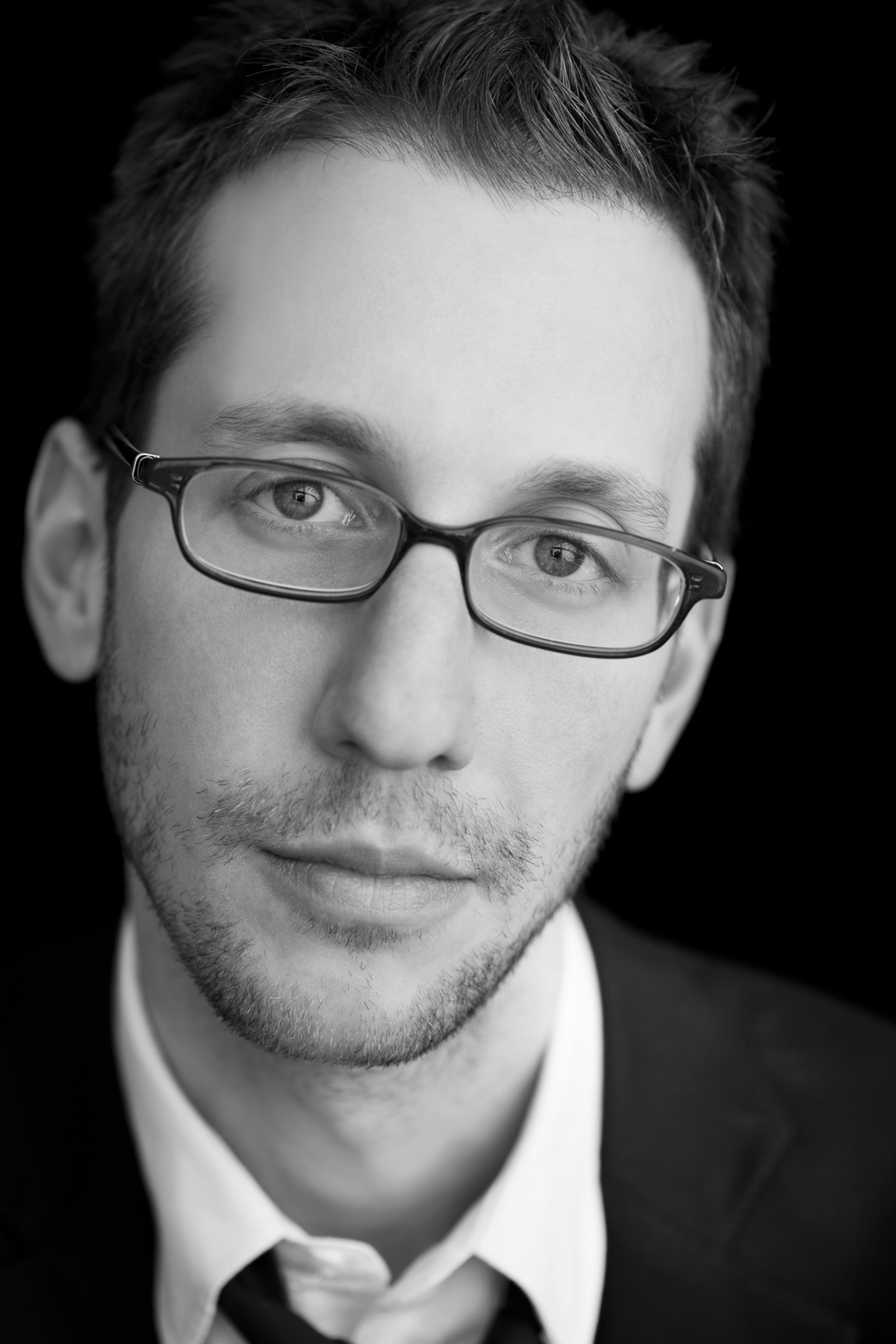
- Born: March 21, 1977 (age 49); Chicago, Illinois, U.S.
- Education: University of Illinois at Chicago; University of Colorado
- Occupations: Novelist, editor
- Spouses: Alpana Singh (m. 2006; div. 2014) Caroline Eick (m. 2016)
- Writing career
- Period: 2003–present
- Genres: Autobiographical fiction Experimental fiction
- Notable work: Vintage Attraction (2013)
- Website: www.charlesblackstone.com

Charles Blackstone (born March 21, 1977) is an American writer. His most recent novel is the semi-autobiographical Vintage Attraction (2013).

== Early life ==
Blackstone was born and raised in Chicago, Illinois. He is the great grandson of Janet Sobel. He graduated from the University of Illinois at Chicago and earned a master's degree from the University of Colorado creative writing program in 2003, where he received the Barker Award for Fiction in 2001.

== Career ==
Blackstone's first novel was the avant-garde The Week You Weren't Here (2005), set in Chicago in the spring of 2001. Using experimental prose, the story follows Hunter Flanagan on his search for true love. Next, he collaborated with Jill Talbot as co-editors of the experimental anthology The Art of Friction: Where (Non)Fictions Come Together (2008), a collection exploring the creative differences between fiction and nonfiction. His stories have been published in literary journals including Bridge, Evergreen Review and The Journal of Experimental Fiction. His short story "Before" was published in Esquire in March 2008 as part of the magazine's Napkin Fiction series.

Set in Chicago and Greece, Blackstone's semi-autobiographical second novel Vintage Attraction is a depiction of the academia, celebrity and fine wine culture. The novel is inspired by his courtship of Alpana Singh, a master sommelier and TV show host whom he would later marry. The character Peter Hapworth, a lonely 30-something adjunct creative writing professor, is based on Blackstone, and Isabelle "Izzy" Conway, who hosts a wine-tasting program, is based on Singh. The novel took Blackstone four years to write.

Writing for the Los Angeles Review of Books, Sabra Embry said that Vintage Attraction's fantasy vs. reality love story was poignant. Reviewing for the Chicago Reader Aimee Levitt described the book as awkwardly written, and the protagonist as unsympathetic. Gapers Block reviewer Ines Bellina praised the descriptions of wine, food, and local Chicago landmarks, but called the plot dull. Michael Lindgren of The Washington Post called the book "a slapdash, irritating affair."

In 2010 Blackstone began serving as managing editor of Bookslut, a literary website founded by Jessa Crispin in 2002. He has worked with writers and served as an editor for the site's monthly reviews.

In 2015, Blackstone taught writing at the Gotham Writers' Workshop in New York City.

== Personal life ==
Blackstone married sommelier and restaurant critic Alpana Singh in 2006. The couple divorced in 2014. In 2016, Blackstone married Caroline Eick, a senior vice president with Philadelphia-based healthcare marketing firm Calcium.

== Honors ==
- University of Colorado's Barker Award for Fiction, 2001
- Newcity's Lit 50: Who Really Books in Chicago, 2012
- Newcity's Lit 50: Who Really Books in Chicago, 2013

== Bibliography ==
=== Fiction ===
- The Week You Weren't Here (2005, Low Fidelity Press)
- Vintage Attraction (2013, Pegasus)

=== Nonfiction ===
- The Art of Friction: Where (Non)Fictions Come Together (2008, University of Texas Press) – editor, with Jill Talbot

=== Collections ===
- The & Now Awards: The Best Innovative Writing, "Before" (2009, Lake Forest College Press); originally appeared in Esquire, March 2008
