= Curtis White (author) =

American essayist and author

Curtis White is an American essayist and author. Most of his career has been spent writing experimental fiction, but he has turned recently to writing books of social criticism. He served as an English professor at Illinois State University in Normal, ILuntil his retirement in 2009.

In 1989, Curtis White co-founded and served as the first Managing Director of Fiction Collective Two (FC2), an independent publisher covering experimental literature.

== Books ==
=== As author ===
- Heretical Songs (short fiction) (Fiction Collective, 1981)
- Metaphysics in the Midwest (stories) (Sun & Moon, 1989)
- The Idea of Home (Sun & Moon, 1993; reprinted by Dalkey Archive Press, 2004)
- Anarcho-Hindu (FC2, 1995)
- Monstrous Possibility: An Invitation to Literary Politics (Dalkey Archive Press, 1998)
- Memories of My Father Watching TV (Dalkey Archive Press, 1998)
- Requiem (Dalkey Archive Press, 2001)
- The Middle Mind: Why Americans Don't Think for Themselves (HarperSanFrancisco, 2003)
- America's Magic Mountain (Dalkey Archive Press, 2004)
- The Spirit of Disobedience: Resisting the Charms of Fake Politics, Mindless Consumption, and the Culture of Total Work (Polipoint Press, 2006)
- The Barbaric Heart: Faith, Money, and the Crisis of Nature (Polipoint Press, 2009)
- The Science Delusion: Asking the Big Questions in a Culture of Easy Answers (Melville House Publishing, 2013)
- We Robots: Staying Human in the Age of Big Data (Melville House Publishing, 2015)
- Lacking Character: A Novel (Melville House Publishing, March 2018)
- Living in a World that Can’t Be Fixed: Reimagining Counterculture Today (Melville House Publishing, November 2019)
- Transcendent: Art and Dharma in a Time of Collapse (Melville House Publishing, 2023)
- On Resistance: A Manifesto (Melville House Publishing, 2026)

=== As editor ===
- American Made (co-edited with Mark Leyner and Thomas Glynn, Fiction Collective, 1986)
- An Illuminated History of the Future (FC2, 1989)
- In The Slipstream: An FC2 Reader (FC2, 1999) (co-edited with Ronald Sukenick)

== Other works ==
=== Lapham's Quarterly ===
- It's Not About You, a preamble to Lapham's Quarterly's Spring 2023 issue

=== Harper's Magazine ===
- The Idols of Environmentalism, a piece mentioning the shortcomings of modern environmentalist philosophy, 2007.
- Hot Air Gods, a critical essay on spiritual and political figures in depth, 2007.

=== Jacobin Magazine ===
- The Philanthropic Complex, an analytical essay on major foundations and how corporate charity acts slow down social reform, 2012.
- DNA: A Parasite that Builds Its Own Host?, a critique of reductionist human evolutionary ideologies, 2013.

=== Tricycle: The Buddhist Review ===
- The Benevolent Unknown, a philosophical essay on the difficulties of staying politically and spiritually engaged in a subjectively collapsing world, 2025.
- Against the Stream, a modern essay examining the collision of Buddhist practice, modern artistic expression, and transcendence, 2023.
- Our World in the Wheel of Life, a social critique of cosmology based on the Buddhist Wheel of Life.
