= Lynn Sukenick =

American poet (1937–1995)

- Born: September 11, 1937; New York City, U.S.
- Died: March 14, 1995 (aged 57); Cambridge, Massachusetts, U.S.
- Education: Brandeis University; City University of New York
- Occupation: Poet

Lynn Luria Sukenick (September 11, 1937, New York, New York – March 14, 1995, Cambridge, Massachusetts) was an American poet. She is also credited with coining the terms "daughter centric", and "matrophobic".

== Life ==
She received her undergraduate education at Brandeis University. She received a doctorate in English from City University of New York.

She taught at San Diego State University, University of California at San Diego, University of California, Irvine, University of California, Santa Cruz, Cornell University, Cleveland State University, the New College of California.

She married Ronald Sukenick, but they divorced in 1984. He collaborated with her in his story "Roast Beef: A Slice of Life" in The Death of the Novel and Other Stories.

Her work appeared in Ironwood, Quarry List, Five Finders Review, California Quarterly,

She coined the term matrophobia, the fear of becoming one's mother, in her work on Doris Lessing.

== Awards ==
- 1977–1978 Amy Lowell Poetry Travelling Scholarship

1975, 1977, 1979, 1982, 1984, 1985, 1991, 1993 Macdowell Fellowship

== Work ==
=== Poetry books ===
- Water astonishing: poems. Ragnarok Press. 1974.
- Houdini. Capra Press. 1973. ISBN 978-0-912264-81-3.
- Problems & Characteristics. Serendipity Books. 1975.
- Houdini Houdini. Cleveland State University Poetry Center. 1982.
- The Hue Everyone Living Knows: Poems. Small Press Distribution. 1993. ISBN 978-1-879342-05-7.

=== Short stories ===
- Danger wall may fall: short stories. Zoland Books. 1997. ISBN 978-0-944072-76-9.

=== Criticism ===
- Arlyn Diamond, Lee R. Edwards, ed. (1988). "On Women and Fiction". The Authority of experience. University of Massachusetts Press. ISBN 978-0-87023-622-8.
- Sukenick, Lynn (1973). "Feeling and Reason in Doris Lessings's Fiction". Contemporary Literature. 14 (4): 515–535. doi:10.2307/1207470. JSTOR 1207470.
