= Jill Talbot =

American writer

- Born: 1970 (age 55–56); Dallas, Texas, United States
- Occupations: Non-fiction writer, essayist
- Writing career
- Genres: Non-fiction, fiction, poetry

Jill Talbot (born 1970) is an American essayist and writer of nonfiction, fiction, and poetry. Talbot is the author of Loaded: Women and Addiction (Seal Press, 2001), and The Way We Weren't (Soft Skull Press, 2015), co-editor of The Art of Friction: Where (Non)fictions Come Together (University of Texas Press, 2008), and the editor of Metawritings: Toward a Theory of Nonfiction (University of Iowa Press, 2012).

== Life and work ==
Jill Talbot was born in Dallas, Texas in 1970. She earned her PhD in Contemporary American Literature and Film at Texas Tech University. She went on to earn her second Masters in Creative Writing from the University of Colorado Boulder. She has served as a writer-in-residence and English professor at Columbia College Chicago, and an English faculty member at St. Lawrence University, Oklahoma State University, Southern Utah University, and New Mexico Highlands University. Talbot's work has appeared in journals such as Brevity, DIAGRAM, Ecotone, The Paris Review Daily, The Pinch, The Rumpus, and Under the Sun. She has a daughter named Indie (born 2002) and currently resides in Texas, working as an Associate Professor of Creative Nonfiction at University of North Texas.

== Works ==
=== Books ===
==== Author ====
- The Way We Weren't. Soft Skull Press. 2015.
- Loaded: Women and Addiction. Seal Press. 2007.

==== Editor ====
- Metawritings: Toward a Theory of Nonfiction. University of Iowa Press. 2012.
- The Art of Friction: Where (Non)fictions Come Together. University of Texas Press. 2008. With Charles Blackstone.

=== Essays ===
==== In print ====
- "Stranded." Brief Encounters: A Collection of Contemporary Nonfiction. W.W. Norton & Company. 2015.
- "Again and Again." Carve. Fall Premiere Issue. 2014.
- "Wine List." PANK. Issue 10. Spring 2014.
- "Stalled." The Pinch. Issue 34.1. Spring 2014.
- "Lost Calls." Barrelhouse Essay Anthology. Barrelhouse Books. 2013.
- "The Man in the Photograph." South Loop Review. Volume 14. Fall 2012.
- "Driving I-15." Ecotone. Fall/Winter 2006.
- "My Two Countries." Under the Sun. 2005.
- "Viva Terlingua!" RE:AL. Fall 2004.
- "My Grandmother's Flowers." Cimarron Review. Issue 148. Summer 2004.

==== Online ====
- "Ledge." The Normal School. Fall 2014.
- "All or Nothing: Self-Portrait at Twenty-Seven." Brevity
- "Kitchen Table: A History." Writers for Dinner
- "Ceremony." River Teeth's "Beautiful Things" Series
- "Seams." Hobart
- "Dream Houses." Ascent
- "On Writing, Like Lust." (a collaborative hybrid with Justin Lawrence Daugherty) Pithead Chapel
- "Third Drink Decisions." The Rumpus
- "Memory Collective." (with Eric LeMay, Jenny Boully, Elena Passarello, Kristen Radtke, Dana Tommasino, Ryan Van Meter, and Dinty W. Moore) Seneca Review "Beyond Category" issue
- "Whipping Post." Hobart
- "Apology." Banango Street
- "Autobiographies." Full Grown People [Notable essay in Best American Essays 2014]
- "The Canyon." Sundog Lit
- "Radio Silence." The Paris Review Daily
- "On Hold." Defunct
- "Stranded." Brevity [Nominated for Pushcart Prize and Best American Essays 2014]
- "On Trouble, Like Dust." Ghost Proposal
- "What Doesn't Break Loose." The Collapsar
- "The Professor of Longing." Diagram
- "Emergent." The Paris Review Daily
- "Running Away from Running Away." The Rumpus
- "The Pieces." Revolution House
- "What I Learned in Homemaking." The Rumpus
- "The Fiction I No Longer Live." Drinking Diaries

=== Poems ===
==== In print ====
- "Wild Horses." Notre Dame Review. January 2009.
- "Black Against Darker Black." Iron County, Utah Poets Folio. Iron Mission Museum. January 2005.
- "Girls in the Blue Truck." Bordersenses. Spring 2004.
- "I Stopped Going to Mexico Because I Never Wanted to Come Back." It's All Good. Manic D Press. 2004.
- "Scenes from the Colorado Summers." Hard Ground 2001: An Anthology of Life in the Rockies. Pronghorn Press. 2001.
- "Museum Saloon." "The Basics of Writing." Blue Mesa Review. Spring/Summer 1998.
- "Two Pictures." Concho River Review. Fall 1997.

==== Online ====
- "Dreaming of Frank Sinatra," "October," and "When I Stop Dreaming of Frank Sinatra." Split Lip Magazine. Issue 9. Jan-Mar 2014.
- "Absorbed," "I Am Half in Love," and "Memorabilia." Hobart. September 18, 2013.
- "Running Isn't Being Free." Blue Fifth Review. Winter 2012.
- "Black." "Afternoon in July." Soundless. July 2012.

=== Interviews ===
- "Interview with Charles Blackstone." Word Riot
- "Interview with Dinty W. Moore." Bookslut
- "Interview with Armchair/Shotgun editor Evan Simko-Bednarski." Bookslut
- "Interview with B.J. Hollars." TriQuarterly
- "Bending Genre/Essay as Play: An Interview with Margot Singer and Nicole Walker." TriQuarterly

=== Craft ===
- "It's Never Just Me: Jill Talbot on 'All or Nothing, Self-Portrait at Twenty-Seven.'" Brevity
- "An Interview with Eric LeMay." New Books Network
- "The Admissions Essay versus the Permission Essay." Brevity
- "Context: Why It Matters." Creative Nonfiction
- "On Brian Oliu's 'mfw-22-Craigslist.'" Essay Daily
- "An Interview with Dinty W. Moore on the Flash Essay." Bookslut
- "Fiction and the Literature of Fact." Brevity
- "Creating Nonfiction." Segue
- "Introduction to Art of Friction." University of Texas
- "On the VanMeteresque." Essay Daily
- "An Advanced Creative Nonfiction Class Interviews Brian Oliu." Brevity
- "A Creative Nonfiction Class Interviews Ryan Van Meter." Brevity
- "State of Flash in the Classroom: A Flash of the Flash." Nano Fiction
