= Davis Schneiderman =

American novelist

Davis Schneiderman (born 1974) is an American academic leader, writer, and higher-education administrator serving as President of Ringling College of Art and Design. With expertise in artificial intelligence, technology ethics, and interdisciplinary innovation, Schneiderman served as the founding Executive Director of the Krebs Center for the Humanities at Lake Forest College, where he ledsnational initiatives on the cultural and ethical dimensions of AI, including the $1.2 million Mellon Foundation-funded HUMAN Initiative. Schneiderman previously served as Provost and Dean of the Faculty at Lake Forest College, and is recognized for his strategic leadership in AI integration, academic innovation, and institutional advancement within liberal arts education. He was co-founder of Lake Forest's interdisciplinary Artificial Intelligence Program and a frequent speaker on AI ethics, education, and the cultural implications of AI technologies.

== Biography ==
Schneiderman earned a B.A. from the Pennsylvania State University in 1996, followed by an M.A. in 1998 and a Ph.D. in 2001 from Binghamton University, SUNY. He joined the faculty at Lake Forest College in 2001, later serving as Chair of the English Department, Associate Dean of the Faculty, and then Provost and Dean of the Faculty from 2018 to 2023.

As Executive Director of the Krebs Center for the Humanities since 2023, Schneiderman has led major public-facing programs often focused on the cultural and ethical dimensions of artificial intelligence, including the Mellon Foundation-funded HUMAN Initiative (Humanities Understanding and Managing AI Nexus). HUMAN supports interdisciplinary curriculum, student research, and the development of experimental AI systems including Cosimo (an AI art docent) and ChiBot (a civic-humanities model in partnership with the Chicago History Museum).

Schneiderman helped develop the HUMAN Residency at the Ragdale Foundation, bringing artists, poets, and technologists into campus dialogue about AI and culture. He expanded institutional partnerships with the University of Bergen’s Center for Digital Narrative, supporting joint programming and faculty collaboration.

Under his leadership, the Krebs Center has hosted high-profile public programs including a conversation with techno-sociologist Zeynep Tufekci, and the public event “Send in the Evil Robots” with New York Times writer Kevin Roose, which explored AI’s impacts on creativity, education, and society.

His recent scholarly work examines cybernetics, machine authorship, and media theory, particularly the influence of William S. Burroughs on generative systems. His essay “The Electronic Revolutionary: Artificial Intelligence and Fake News” will appear in *William S. Burroughs in Context*, which he is co-editing with Oliver Harris and Alex Wermer-Colan for Cambridge University Press (2026). He received an Illinois Arts Council Creative Catalyst Grant in 2025 to develop an AI-themed performance piece in collaboration with his spouse, actor and writer Kelly Haramis.

== Works ==
Schneiderman is the author or editor of more than 10 books. As a creative writer, his recent novels include the DEAD/BOOKS trilogy, including the blank novel BLANK, the plagiarized novel [SIC](a collaboration with Andi Olsen, with an introduction by Oulipo member Daniel Levin-Becker) and the ink-smeared novel INK. (collaboration with Tim Guthrie); as well as the sci-fi dystopia novel Drain (Northwestern). Schneiderman edited wrote the introduction for the last novel from WWII survivor Raymond Federman. Schneiderman's work has appeared in numerous publications including Fiction International, Harpers.org, The Chicago Tribune, The Iowa Review, TriQuarterly, and Exquisite Corpse; he is a long-time contributor for The Huffington Post.

Writing about his novel Drain, reviewer Renée E. D'Aoust praised the way Schneiderman "conjures images within images" and called the book "creepy and bloody effective". Writing about Schneiderman's work, critic Edward S. Robinson notes that Schneiderman's "novels are imbued with theoretical complexity and a keen self-awareness, but without being smugly in your face with self-reflexivity....[and] his writing indisputably engages with contemporary discourse and is designed to provoke thought and debate."

Schneiderman's work has garnered notice for its unusual packaging, as well as for its writing. He bound his first book Multifesto in sandpaper to purposely damage the books next to it. Another of his books was encased in plaster. BLANK had collage musical tracks provided by Paul Miller, aka dj spooky. The remix edition of his debut novel Multifesto, originally 2006 and republished in 2013, contained remixes from the author Roxane Gay, Matt Bell, and Kathleen Rooney, among others.

As a scholar, Schneiderman is a recognized expert on the work of William S. Burroughs, and his co-edited collection Retaking the Universe: William S. Burroughs in the Age of Globalization was republished on its tenth anniversary at Realitystudio.com, the leading Burroughs website. With Oliver Harris and Alex Wermer-Colan, Schneiderman co-edited William Burroughs in Context for Cambridge University Press (2026); this edited collection of 35 essays that explores William S. Burroughs’ literary, artistic, and cultural contributions from interdisciplinary perspectives spanning literature, media, technology, philosophy, and the arts. Schneiderman has also been announced as editorial contributor to Come in with the Dutchman, a forthcoming revised version of Burroughs' The Last Words of Dutch Schultz, edited by James Grauerholz.

Schneiderman has also written extensively about innovative literature, the Surrealist Exquisite Corpse, and copyright and collage and remix culture.

As a journalist and essayist, Schneiderman has interviewed John Waters, Temple Grandin, Edward Snowden's ACLU lawyer Ben Wizner, Sherry Turkle, David Shields, Ruth Ozeki, Jean Kwok, and Aleksandar Hemon, about his work as a writer for the Netflix series Sense8, among others.

As Director of Lake Forest College Press, Schneiderman has published books on transportation and architectural issues including Beyond Burnham: An Illustrated History of Planning for the Chicago Region and Terminal Town: An Illustrated Guide to Chicago's Airports, Bus Depots, Train Stations, and Steamship Landings, 1939 - Present. Schneiderman and the author of these works, Joseph P. Schwieterman of DePaul University's Chaddick Institute for Metropolitan Development, collaborated through the Digital Chicago grant on Windy City in Motion, an exhibit at Chicago's Union Station.

== Digital humanities and non-paper works ==
Schneiderman has directed several digital humanities projects. These include the six-campus Exquisite Corpse project (2002-2005), funded by the Midwest Instructional Technology Center among Lake Forest College, Kenyon College, DePauw University, Monmouth College, Oberlin College, and Colorado College; the Virtual Burnham Initiative (2007-2010) funded by the National Endowment for the Humanities Office of Digital Humanities. His Virtual Burnham Initiative, and the work is now part of the Chicago History Museum digital collection, as part of the Digital Chicago website.

In addition, Schneiderman has served as PI for three grants from funded by The Andrew W. Mellon Foundation. This first was a planning grant among Lake Forest College, Knox College, and Beloit College for a collaboration among English Departments, and the four-year $800,000 Digital Chicago: Unearthing History and Culture project. Digital Chicago involves "students and faculty in exploring specific at-risk or forgotten sites in Chicago's history, through urban archeological digs, innovative digital humanities projects, and complementary coursework in a wide array of disciplines, including English, History, Art, Music, and others." The works from Digital Chicago are now housed at the Chicago History Museum digital collection, and include Schneiderman's Virtual Burnham project, which "transforms a selection of flat images from the 1909 Plan of Chicago—by Daniel H. Burnham and Edward H. Bennett into 3-D models." The third grant is the $1.1 million Humanities 2020 initiative, a partnership between Lake Forest College and the Chicago History Museum, the Chicago Humanities Festival, and other Chicago cultural and humanitarian organizations.

As a multimedia artist, Schneiderman creates audio, video and performance works as part of The Muttering Sickness collective, and recent works include "Modern Business Machines" a collaboration with actor and director Regina Taylor and Chicago's Goodman Theater; performances as the 2014 and 2016 Chicago Humanities Festival; the former in performance with Jon Langford (of The Mekons) and Anne Waldman and others; the latter debuting a drone video connected to the Art Institute of Chicago's exhibit on Hungarian artist Lazlo Moholy-Nagy, published at Big Other; and an album, The Last Days of Radio, released on poet Ann Waldman's record label.

Schneiderman is also the lead writer for Tim Guthrie's award-winning exhibit The Museum of Alternative History, with the Omaha Reader noting that the show "is conceived of and executed masterfully. It taps into the current zeitgeist, which supports the twisting of fact, skewing of science, and values opinion and belief over data and truth." The show won the Omaha Arts and Entertainment Awards and Best Group Show in the group's 8th- and 13th-annual awards. The Museum's most-recent award-winning run, from June 1 – September 26, 2018 at Omaha's KANEKO gallery, and was followed by a "pop-up" exhibit at the 2019 &NOW Festival at the University of Washington, Bothell.

== Media appearances ==
Schneiderman is featured prominently in the 2019 documentary film The World According to Radiohead, from ARTE TV, where he discusses Radiohead's connection to Noam Chomsky and Naomi Klein. He has appeared on Chicago area and national media, including Chicago Tonight where he offered counter-intuitive college success tips, the Collegiate Empowerment podcast, among others.

== Bibliography ==
=== Novels ===
- INK.: a novel. (Jaded Ibis, 2016).
- SIC: a novel. (Jaded Ibis, 2013).
- Blank: a novel. (Jaded Ibis, 2011).
- Drain. (TriQuarterly/Northwestern, 2010).
- DIS, Or, in the Shadow of the Dome of Pleasure. (Buffalo, NY: BlazeVOX Books, 2008).
- Abecedarium. [w/ Carlos Hernandez] (Portland, OR: Chiasmus Press, 2007).
- Multifesto: A Henri d’Mescan Reader. (New York: Spuyten Duyvil Press. Limited-edition art book, 2006; remix edition 2013).

=== Edited collections ===
- The Exquisite Corpse: Chance and Collaboration in Surrealism's Parlor Game. Eds. Kanta Kochhar-Lindgren, Davis Schneiderman, and Tom Denlinger. (Lincoln, NE: University of Nebraska Press, 2009).
- Retaking the Universe: William S. Burroughs in the Age of Globalization. Eds. Davis Schneiderman and Philip Walsh. (London: Pluto Press, 2004; Reality Studio, 2014).

=== Audiocollage albums ===
- The Last Days of Radio. (Fast-Speaking Music, 2015).
- Memorials to Future Catastrophes (with Don Meyer and Tom Denlinger). (Kansas City, MO: Jaded Ibis Productions, 2008).
