= Polipoint Press =

- Status: Defunct (2011)
- Founded: 2004
- Country of origin: United States
- Headquarters location: Sausalito, California
- Publication types: Books

PoliPoint Press (or P3Books) was a San Francisco Bay Area publishing company that was founded to print the writings of University of Phoenix founder John Sperling.

In 2004 it published its first book, Sperling's The Great Divide, a book of essays and full-color illustrations arguing that the Democratic Party, in order to retake the United States presidency, must abandon efforts in the allegedly culturally backwards "red states." The company was brought into being to "bring new ideas and perspectives into the body politic, to ignite dialogue," according to publisher Scott Jordan, a former publicist for the Saudi Arabian government.

Under editorial director Peter Richardson, the company went on to publish books by Sasha Abramsky, Rose Aguilar, Dean Baker, Jeff Cohen, Joe Conason, Marjorie Cohn, Kevin Danaher, Belva Davis, Reese Erlich, Steven Hill, Phillip Longman, Markos Moulitsas, David Neiwert, Christine Pelosi, William Rivers Pitt, Sarah Posner, Nomi Prins, Norman Solomon, and Curtis White. One PoliPoint Press book, The Spy Who Tried to Stop a War (2008), was the basis for Official Secrets, the 2019 film starring Keira Knightley.

PoliPoint Press's offices were in Sausalito, California. The company closed in 2011, selling off rights to its books to Paradigm Publishers and Berrett-Koehler Publishers.
