= Nomi Prins =

Author and journalist

Nomi M. Prins
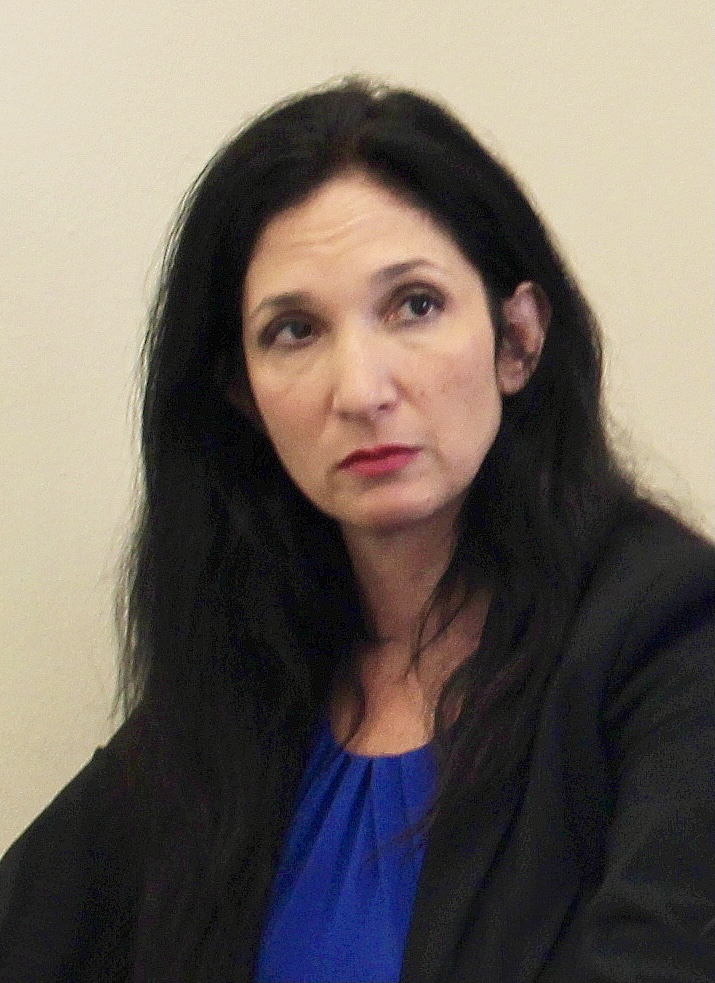
- Prins in June 2017 at a Congressional briefing
- Born: Poughkeepsie, New York, U.S.
- Education: Federal University of Rio Grande do Sul (PhD); New York University (MS); State University of New York at Purchase (BS)
- Alma mater: Leonard N. Stern School of Business
- Occupations: Author, Journalist and former Distinguished Senior Fellow at Demos
- Known for: Collusion: How Central Bankers Rigged the World; All the Presidents' Bankers: The Hidden Alliances that Drive American Power; It Takes a Pillage: Behind the Bonuses, Bailouts, and Backroom Deals from Washington to Wall Street; Black Tuesday; Other People's Money: The Corporate Mugging of America
- Website: nomiprins.com

Nomi Prins is an American economist, author, journalist, and public speaker who writes about Wall Street and the US economy.

Before becoming a journalist and public speaker, Prins worked in the finance industry. She was a managing director at Goldman Sachs, senior managing director at Bear Stearns in London, senior strategist at Lehman Brothers and analyst at the Chase Manhattan Bank. Prins has been a Distinguished Senior Fellow at Demos think tank from 2002 to 2016. An advocate for the reinstatement of the Glass–Steagall Act and other regulatory reform of the financial industry, Prins was a member of Senator Bernie Sanders' panel of expert economists formed to advise on reforming the Federal Reserve.

== Early life ==
Nomi Prins was born in Upstate New York, the oldest child in her family. Her father Jack Prins worked for IBM after having taught at the local college as a mathematics professor.

== Education ==
Prins received her bachelor's degree in mathematics from State University of New York at Purchase with a minor in music and a Master of Science in statistics from New York University. She received her PhD in International Strategic Studies with a specialization in International Political Economy from the Federal University of Rio Grande do Sul in Porto Alegre, Brazil.

== Career ==
=== Finance ===
After graduating, Prins started at Chase Manhattan bank as an analyst, after which she worked as a senior strategist for Lehman Brothers. In 1993 she moved to Bear Stearns in London, where she led the international analytics group as a senior managing director. Finally, she worked for two years as a managing director at Goldman Sachs, until she quit Wall Street. Prins was then a Distinguished Senior Fellow at the US think tank Demos from 2002 to 2016.

Prins has been a speaker on how to get banks to better serve the real economy at the Federal Reserve, International Monetary Fund and World Bank Annual conference. She has also offered public testimony to the U.S Senate speaking on the growing influence of private equity firms and Wall Street greed.

=== Author ===
Prins is the author of All the Presidents' Bankers: The Hidden Alliances that Drive American Power. Based on original archival documents, the book explores over a century of the often symbiotic, and sometimes-adversarial, close relationships between the 19 presidents from Teddy Roosevelt to Barack Obama and the key bankers of their day, and analyzes how they shaped US domestic and foreign policy. She authored a whistleblower book, It Takes a Pillage: Behind the Bonuses, Bailouts, and Backroom Deals from Washington to Wall Street.

Prins's articles have appeared in The New York Times, Fortune, Newsday, Mother Jones, Slate.com, The Guardian, The Nation, The American Prospect, Alternet, New York Daily News, La Vanguardia, and other publications. She is a monthly contributor to Tom Dispatch where she offers analysis on the connections between Wall Street and Washington. Her latest book, Permanent Distortion was released in October 2022. Permanent Distortion details how the movement of money by central banks has influenced global markets and economic policies and furthered the separation between Wall Street and the real economy. The Nation Books imprint Bold Type Books published her book Collusion.

== Works ==
- Permanent Distortion: How the Financial Markets Abandoned the Real Economy Forever – Publisher: Public Affairs (10/11/22): ISBN 978-1541789067.
- Collusion: How Central Bankers Rigged the World - Publisher: Nation Books (5/1/18): ISBN 978-1568585628. The author claims that central bankers control global markets and dictate economic policy.
- All the Presidents' Bankers: The Hidden Alliances that Drive American Power – Publisher: Nation Books (4/8/14): ISBN 978-1568587493.
- It Takes a Pillage: Behind the Bonuses, Bailouts, and Backroom Deals from Washington to Wall Street – Publisher: John Wiley & Sons (9/22/09); ISBN 0-470-52959-8; ISBN 978-0-470-52959-1.
- Other People's Money: The Corporate Mugging of America – Publisher: New Press (8/1/06); ISBN 1-59558-063-8; ISBN 978-1-59558-063-4. An account of corporate corruption, political collusion and Wall Street deception. This book was chosen as a Best Book of 2004 by The Economist, Barron's and The Library Journal.
- Jacked: How "Conservatives" are Picking your Pocket (whether you voted for them or not) – Publisher: Polipoint Press (9/1/06); ISBN 0-9760621-8-6; ISBN 978-0-9760621-8-9. Catalogs her travels around the USA talking to people about their economic lives.
- Black Tuesday – Publisher: CreateSpace 2011 – ISBN 1-4635-5766-3. A historical novel about the Crash of 1929.
