= Fiction Collective Two =

Publisher

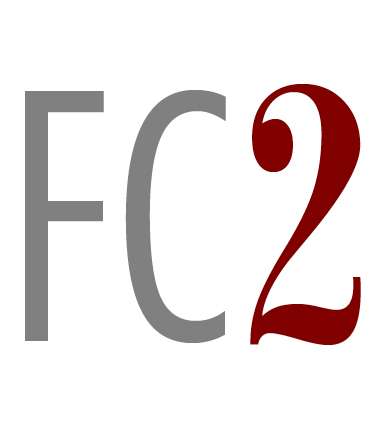
- Status: Active
- Founded: 1974
- Founder: Curtis White, Ronald Sukenick, Mark Leyner, Jonathan Baumbach, B. H. Friedman, and Peter Spielberg
- Country of origin: United States
- Headquarters location: Salt Lake City, Utah
- Fiction genres: Fiction
- Official website: www.fc2.org

Fiction Collective Two (FC2) is an author-run, not-for-profit publisher of avant-garde, experimental fiction supported in part by the University of Utah, the University of Alabama Press, Central Michigan University, Illinois State University, private contributors, arts organizations and foundations, and contest fees.

== History ==
The precursor to FC2, the Fiction Collective, was founded in 1974 by Jonathan Baumbach, Peter Spielberg, B. H. Friedman, Mark Jay Mirsky, Steve Katz, and Ronald Sukenick, among others. It formed the first US not-for-profit publishing collective run by innovative authors and for innovative authors. According to Sukenick, the Fiction Collective was intended to "make serious novels and story collections available in simultaneous hard and quality paper editions" and to "keep them in print permanently." Although geographically disparate (including members in California and Colorado), the offices of the Fiction Collective were located at Brooklyn College. FC established distribution in the fall of 1974, utilizing George Braziller, a distributor of European fiction. In 1979, Carol Sturm Smith took the reins of Co-Director (acting as president) from Jonathan Baumbach; Raymond Federman succeeded Peter Spielberg. For the remainder of the 1970s and much of the 1980s, the Fiction Collective published steadily (usually around six books a year), supported by The New York State Council for the Arts and the National Endowment for the Arts.

In 1986, reductions in arts funding enacted by the Reagan administration resulted in denial of the Fiction Collective's NEA grant application. During this period, the organization also struggled with decision-making and management issues. In 1989, Curtis White, Ronald Sukenick, Mark Leyner, Jonathan Baumbach, B. H. Friedman, and Peter Spielberg decided to reorganize the press, and founded Fiction Collective Two, or FC2 for short.

The new iteration of the press began once again to receive National Endowment for the Arts funding in the mid-1990s, but in 1996 that funding was challenged by the Congressional Subcommittee on Oversight and Investigations, due to material in FC2 books the Committee deemed offensive. During the subsequent hearings, FC2 received public support from such writers as Mark Strand, William H. Gass, and Toni Morrison. Despite the hearings, FC2 continued to publish throughout the 1990s, including several notable titles (Mark Amerika's The Kafka Chronicles, Cris Mazza's Revelation Countdown, and Samuel R. Delany's Hogg among them) under their Avant-Pop imprint, Black Ice Books.

From 1999 to 2002, FC2 underwent several changes: managing editor Curtis White stepped down; FC2 authors R. M. Berry and Jeffrey DeShell re-organized the press and became acting publishers for a time; and then Lance Olsen became the new Chair of the Board of Directors, and a new Board of Advisors was formed. In 2006, FC2 moved marketing and distribution from Illinois State University to the University of Alabama Press. Layout and design continues to be performed at Publications Center at Illinois State University. In 2007 FC2 moved its business offices from Florida State University to the University of Houston–Victoria. In 2011, FC2 closed its business offices at University of Houston–Victoria, and Olsen oversees operations from the University of Utah.

=== Organization ===
FC2 is an imprint of the University of Alabama Press where book production (generally six new books a year and one reprint), distribution, and marketing are handled. FC2's editorial offices reside at Central Michigan University. In 2018, business and general operations moved from University of Utah to Wake Forest University. Author Joanna Ruocco (Wake Forest University) serves as the Chair of the Board of Directors, which, in 2018, consisted of Jeffrey Deshell (University of Colorado-Boulder), Noy Holland (University of Massachusetts), Michael Mejia (University of Utah), Lance Olsen (University of Utah), Matthew Roberson (Central Michigan University), Elisabeth Sheffield (University of Colorado-Boulder), and Dan Waterman (non-voting representative for University of Alabama Press).

== Contests ==
FC2 sponsors two book contests annually. The Ronald Sukenick American Book Review Innovative Fiction Prize was started in 2006 as a way to find emerging authors whose innovative aesthetic vision harmonizes with that of FC2. According to the contest page, "the prize is open to any U.S. writer in English who has not previously published with Fiction Collective Two." The winner receives publication of her/his manuscript and $1500. The 2012 winner was Luke B. Goebel for Fourteen Stories, None of Them Are Yours. In 2015, Marc Anthony Richardson's Year of the Rat won the prize, and subsequently won the 2017 American Book Award.

In 2008, FC2 launched the Catherine Doctorow Innovative Fiction Prize to bring other established innovative writers to the press. The prize is "open to any U.S. writer in English with at least three books of fiction published." The winner receives publication of her/his manuscript and $15,000. The 2012 winner was Michelle Richmond for The Hero of Queens Boulevard and Other Stories.

Each year both prizes run from August 15 through November 1. Winners are announced in May.

== Literary impact ==
Since its founding in 1974, the press (the Fiction Collective, FC2, and the FC2 imprint Black Ice Books) has published more than 200 books. They have been mentioned in the "top books" of The Nation, Publishers Weekly, The Village Voice, and The New York Times Book Review. FC2 authors Clarence Major, Gerald Vizenor and Diane Glancy were included in the Norton Anthology of American Literature (fifth edition). Curtis White, Ricardo Cortez Cruz, Gerald Vizenor, Mark Leyner and Samuel R. Delany were also included in Postmodern American Fiction: A Norton Anthology. In 2002, the American Academy of Arts and Letters honored founder Ronald Sukenick with the Morton Dauwen Zabel Award, stating "he has been an explorer, a courageous adventurer, and an absolutely necessary component of American literature."

The press and its authors have also been the subjects of essays in such journals as Critique, the Review of Contemporary Fiction, the Chicago Review, Poets & Writers, Contemporary Literature, TriQuarterly, Rain Taxi, American Book Review, Extrapolation, and The Chronicle of Higher Education. FC2 authors have received awards and nominations from PEN West, the Oregon Book Award, the Independent Publisher Award for Multicultural Fiction, the American Book Awards, the Western Book Award, the N.E.A., the Guggenheim Foundation, and the Firecracker Alternative Book Award.

== Selected authors ==
- Kim Addonizio
- Lucy Corin
- Samuel R. Delany
- Brian Evenson
- Raymond Federman
- Marianne Hauser
- Fanny Howe
- Amelia Gray
- Stephen Graham Jones
- Michael Joyce
- Brian Kiteley
- Michael Martone
- Clarence Major
- Larry McCaffery
- John Shirley
- Yuriy Tarnawsky
- Melanie Rae Thon
- Mac Wellman
- Diane Williams
