= Video game culture =

Worldwide subculture

Video game culture or gaming culture is a worldwide subculture formed by video game enthusiasts. As video games have grown more sophisticated, accessible, and popular over time, they have significantly influenced popular culture, particularly among adolescents and young adults. Video game culture has also evolved with Internet culture and the increasing popularity of mobile games, which has additionally led to an increase in the female demographic that play video games. Notably, the COVID-19 pandemic has contributed to a significant increase in video game engagement as well.

People who regularly play video games often identify as "gamers", a broad term that can encompass casual gamers to passionate enthusiasts and professional gaming competitors. As video games become more social with multiplayer and online features, gamers find themselves in growing interconnected social networks. Playing video games can be for both entertainment and competition, as the trend known as electronic sports or esports has become more widely accepted. Video game-focused gaming conventions such as PAX and MAGFest which have become popular social-gathering events among computer enthusiasts since early 21st century. Gaming system reviews and gameplay streamings have also become significant part of this culture.

== Definition ==
Video game culture is broadly defined as the subculture of individuals who play video games. This includes both frequent gamers, who dedicate substantial time and effort into gaming, as well as more casual gamers who engage with games less regularly. Due to the interactive nature of video games, the culture surrounding them is distinct from other subcultures, focusing not only on who plays, but also on the types of games played and the ways in which people engage with them. The concept that video games have a distinct subculture was first suggested in 1996, but it gained more prominence as an area of academic study since the 2010s.

== Demographics ==
As of 2016, the average age for a video game player is 31, a number slowly increasing as people who were children playing the first arcade, console and home computer games continue playing and adopting newer systems. The gender distribution of gamers is reaching equilibrium, according to a 2016 study showing that 59% of gamers are male and 41% female; but research has also shown that women are less likely to self-identify as gamers out of fear of stigmatization. As of 2011 ESA reported that 71% of people age six to forty-nine in the United States played video games, with 55% of gamers playing on their smartphones or mobile devices. The average age of players across the globe is mid- to late 20s, and is increasing as older players grow in numbers.

According to a 2008 telephone survey with a sample size of 1,102 respondents, 97% of children living in the United States and between the ages of 12 and 17 played video games, while a 2019 report by the UK Children's Commissioner noted that 93% of UK children had played video games.

== LAN gaming ==
Video games are played in a variety of social ways, which often involve domestic gatherings or even in public places. A popular method of accomplishing this is a LAN (Local Area Network) party, which is hosted at a home and involves family and friends, creating a social event for people-friendly with each other. LAN parties are often held in large-scale events conducted in public spaces and have a great number of participants who might not usually socialize.

The Everquest Fan Faires for instance, provide weekends of socializing and playing, at a large gathering (an event of several thousand) of dedicated game fans. Terry Flew in his book Games: Technology, Industry, Culture also emphasizes the Online Gaming Communities – "where players aren't physically located in the same space, but still socializing together". This raises the notion of McLuhan's "Global Village", as people can transcend their physical limitations and communicate with people, possessing a similar interest, from all around the world. Shapiro also stresses the possibility of "Using technology to enhance one's social life", as friendships no longer have to be structured by physical proximity (e.g. neighbors, colleagues). Shapiro states that "the net (Online Gaming Communities) allows individuals to extend their social network in a novel way, to communicate and share life experiences with people regardless of where they live and form online relationships". Thus, such online communities satisfy a genuine need for affiliation with like-minded others.

== Online gaming ==
Online gaming has drastically increased the scope and size of video game culture. Online gaming grew out of games on bulletin board systems and on college mainframes from the 1970s and 1980s. MUDs offered multiplayer competition and cooperation, but on a scope more geographically limited than on the Internet. The Internet allowed gamers from all over the world – not just within one country or state – to play games together with ease. With the advent of Cloud Gaming high-performance games can now be played from low-end client systems and even TVs.

One of the most groundbreaking titles in the history of online video games is Quake, which offered the ability to play with sixteen and eventually up to thirty-two players simultaneously in a 3D world. Gamers quickly began to establish their organized groups, called clans. Clans established their own identities, their marketing, their form of internal organization, and even their looks. Some clans had friendly or hostile rivalries, and there were often clans who were allied with other clans. Clan interaction took place on both professionally set competition events, and during normal casual playing where several members of one clan would play on a public server. Clans would often do their recruiting this way; by noticing the best players on a particular server, they would send invitations for that player to either try out or accept membership in the clan.

Gamers of all ages play online games, with an average age of 33.

'Clan'- or 'guild'-based play has since become an accepted (and expected) aspect of multiplayer video games, with several games offering cash-prize tournament-style competition to their players. Many clans and guilds also have active fan-bases, which, when combined with the 'tournament' aspect, contribute to turning clan-based gaming into a semi-professional sport. Clans also allow players to assist each other in simulated combat and quests in-game advancement, as well as providing an online family for friendly socializing. From Quake, online video games grew beyond first-person shooters and have impacted every genre. Real-time strategy, racing games, card games, sports games can all be played online. Online gaming has spread from its initial computer roots to console video games as well. Today, every major video game console available offers degrees of online gaming, some limited by particular titles, some even offer up entire virtual communities.

=== Slang and terminology ===
The DreamHack LAN party in 2004

Like other cultures, the community has developed a gamut of slang words or phrases that can be used for communication in or outside of games. Due to their growing online nature, modern video game slang overlaps heavily with Internet slang, as well as Leetspeak, with many words such "pwn", as well as "noob", being direct carry-overs from Leetspeak. There are terms to describe video game events, game genres, gamer demographics, strategies, specific events, situations, and more. It is especially common among online games to encourage the use of neologisms for convenience in communication.

Most video games contain certain language or communication familiar to game and its player base. Overall the gaming community has common phrases that are used universally. The two most common phrases are "noob", which relates to a player who is low in skill and that they are relatively new to the game. The other phrase is "lol", which means "laughing out loud", this phrase is also used outside of gaming. There are also phrases that players use before and at the end of their matches. The abbreviation of "GL HF" is seen at the start meaning, "good luck, have fun". Then at the end, whether people win or lose, players use "GG", meaning "good game" to their opponents. A popular abbreviation the gaming culture created and uses is "AFK". This means "away from keyboard", and is used when a player is not using their keyboard or controller and are not paying attention.

=== Gaming networks ===
The shift from console-based or "shrink-wrap" video games to online games has allowed online games and massively-multiplayer online gaming (MMOG) today to develop highly advanced and comprehensive communication networks. With the freedom of the Internet's architecture, users can become producers of the technology and shapers of the growing networks. Compared to past eras where consumers had little means of communication with game developers and other communities beyond their geographical location, the Internet has created many methods of communication such as through the online bulletin board website, Reddit. Gamers can often develop sub-communities in-game clans and may use third party VOIP programs to communicate while playing games such as Skype, Ventrillo, TeamSpeak or Discord. These video game communities may have nothing in common, or instead be designed for dedicated, skilled players, or even clans made for those with shared commonalities such as personality, ethnicity, heritage, language or gender.

Another key component of many video game networks is the connection between the player base and the game developers. Many game developers have outlets either through official website forums or social media where gamers can communicate with and provide feedback to the game developers. Likewise, these same places become key locations for game developers to communicate with their fans, were often dedicated employees act as liaisons as a bridge between the company and the community.

Some of the most advanced networks take place with massively-multiplayer online gaming where servers of tens of thousands can be present simultaneously in the same instance or environment. In major titles such as World of Warcraft and League of Legends, the player base is in the millions. With so many people, many of these communities may develop virtual economies that may use a barter system or currency system. In some games, the interest in the virtual economies may be so great players will spend real money through auction sites like eBay for virtual property and items, commonly known as RMT (Real Market Trading). Some game developers may ban RMT in their games, especially when it interferes with the equity of the game. That being said, other game developers embrace it with one game, Second Life, with its entire focus on the usage of real-life currency for everything in the game world.

Since smartphones became commonplace around 2007, mobile video games have seen rapid increases in popularity. The widespread appeal of simple, "time-killing" games, reminiscent of "social games" such as those found on Facebook, has set the stage for mobile video games to account for almost 35% of video games' total market share by 2017. Because games such as Clash of Clans offer in-game bonuses for referring new players to the game, mobile gamers have turned to social media sites to recruit their friends and family. Some games even offer integrated social media support to provide players with in-game chat or "friends" features for communicating and competing with other players. A large number of mobile game players has led to the creation of devoted forums, blogs, and tip sites similar to those committed to console video games. Popular video game publications, like Ars Technica and TouchArcade are even beginning to give significant coverage to mobile games.

=== Debate over social culture versus antisocial culture ===
There has been much debate among media theorists as to whether video games are an inherently social or anti-social activity. Terry Flew argues that digital games are "increasingly social, a trend that works against the mainstream media's portrayal of players as isolated, usually adolescent boys hidden away in darkened bedrooms, failing to engage with the social world." He asserts that games are played in very social and public settings; for example computers and consoles are often played in living areas of domestic homes, where people play with family or friends.

David Marshall argues against the rich source of "effects" based research, finding that games are "deliberating and anti-social forms of behavior". Rather suggesting that "the reality of most games is that they are dynamically social – the elaborate social conversations that emerge from playing games online in massive multi-player formats" (MMOG). Exemplifying 'The Sims Online', he states "has built up entire political and social structures in given communities' that provide an elaborate game life for participants". Gamers in these online worlds participate in many-to-many forms of communication and one-to-one correspondence. The games are not only massive; they are also "intimate and social".

Gosney argues that alternate reality gaming is also inherently social, drawing upon Pierre Levy's (Levy 1998) notion of collective intelligence. He states that the game relied upon an "unprecedented level of corroboration and collective intelligence to solve the game". The issue of collective and corroborative team play is essential to ARG, thus are anything but a solitary activity.

Hans Geser further rejects the mainstream media view that video games as an anti-social activity, asserting "there is considerable empirical evidence that Second Life serves mainly to widen the life experience of individuals who have already a rich 'First Life', not as a compensating device for marginal loners." Thus highlighting the "fantastic social possibilities of Second Life", as the intangible reward of social belongingness is of paramount importance. Bray and Konsynski also argue the ability of the technology "to enrich their lives", as most Millennials report: "No difference between friendships developed in the real world vs. friendships developed online, and most use the Internet to maintain their social networks and plan their social activities".

== Social implications of video games on adolescents ==
Video games have been found to have both positive and negative impacts on the social behavior and development of adolescents. Positively, studies have shown that participation in video games can increase social development in children, specifically by enriching executive functions like attention, planning, and problem-solving, which in turn support social interactions. These cognitive skills can aid adolescents in navigating social situations and communicating effectively with others. Additionally, multiplayer and online games can promote social connections, especially with player interaction either in cooperative or competitive settings potentially developing teamwork abilities. In particular, multiplayer online games may encourage players to work as a team, solve problems, and build virtual communities, creating a space for socialization in the digital world.

On the other hand, video game use has also been associated with negative social outcomes, especially when addiction is involved. Research has been conducted to compare the social skills of students both addicted and not and concluded that gaming may reduce social competence, leading to a multitude of issues such as poor communication, social isolation, and reduced empathy. In more extreme cases, addiction to video games has been linked to developments of antisocial behavior and separation from real world interactions. Moreover, game designer William Siu, in his article I Make Video Games. I Won't Let My Daughters Play Them, expresses concern over the potentially harmful effects of video games, particularly their immersive nature and its potential for addiction. William Siu argues that video games have the potential to disrupt the development of critical social skills, as children become more immersed in their virtual worlds.

Furthermore, the effects of video games on adolescents are not proven to be universally negative or positive, most of the time they are influenced by factors such as the type of games played, the amount of time spent gaming, and the individual's ability to balance gaming with real-world social interactions.

== Cognitive and developmental effects ==
Video games have been proven to influence cognitive development, both positively and negatively. Research has also proven that video games, specifically that require strategy, critical thinking, or complex decision making have the potential to enhance cognitive ability. For example, it has been proven that video game engagement can improve executive functions like attention, planning, and problem-solving. Skills like these are essential in an academic setting and social interactions. This is due to the fact that they help individuals to better organize tasks, focus attention, and make decisions in a timely manner. As mentioned previously, the type of video game can weigh heavily on the cognitive impact it has. Action packed video games, for example, have been proven to improve visual attention and hand-eye coordination. Players of action packed video games have additionally been shown to exceed at tasks which require visual processing speed and selective attention.

However, not all aspects of video gaming are beneficial for cognitive development. Certain changes in cognitive development can be detrimental to development areas such as problem-solving, attention span, and decision-making. Video games have a high possibility of becoming addictive, which has additionally been linked to several cognitive and developmental drawbacks. It has been proved that students who are addicted to video games often show decreased attention spans and diminished impulse control, which can result in many negative effects in their lives. Due to the addictive nature of video games, it has been found that it results in more time spent playing online than in real world social scenarios. William Siu, a founder of the mobile gaming developer Storm8, expresses concerns that the immersive and often addictive nature of video games may disrupt the development of important life skills. He states that children who spend excessive time gaming become accustomed to the fast-paced and instant gratification offered by many video games, which leads to negative behavioral patterns, including social withdrawal and reduced face-to-face interaction, which may limit opportunities for practicing critical social and cognitive skills. While video games can offer valuable cognitive benefits, especially when played in moderation, excessive or unregulated gaming can impair attention, impulse control, and decision-making. The impact of video games on cognitive development ultimately depends on the type of games played, the time spent gaming, and the balance between virtual and real-world activities.

== Gender representation and the marginalization of women in video game culture ==
As the demographics of both video game developers and players have shifted, issues related to women in video games, such as sexism and gender representation, have received increased attention from academia, the media, the gaming industry, and gamers themselves.

Video game culture has long been criticized as a space dominated by heterosexual men, with the industry often focusing on producing games that reflect male interests and perspectives, reinforcing the notion of the "true gamer" as a heterosexual male. The stereotype of the "true gamer" has marginalized those who do not fit this mold, particularly women, by framing gaming as a masculine activity and excluding other identities. As a result, women in the gaming space often find themselves on the outskirts, with some even concealing their gender to avoid stigmatization or exclusion. Research has shown that female gamers frequently feel ostracized by their male counterparts and, as a result, may alter their behavior to fit in, such as adopting more masculine personas, using male avatars, or changing their voices during online interactions. Despite these challenges, women make up approximately 41% of all gamers, challenging the stereotype that gaming is a male-dominated pastime. On the other hand, research has shown that, on average, women tend to spend less time playing video games than men. However, these findings are based on self-reported data, which can be influenced by social and cultural factors. Studies indicate that women are more likely than men to underestimate their gaming time. Specifically, men in the study underestimated their weekly play time by about one hour, while women underestimated theirs by more than three hours. This suggests that women may downplay their gaming habits, possibly due to societal expectations or perceptions of gaming as a male-dominated activity.

== LGBTQ+ representation and gender disparity in the video game industry ==
The LGBTQ+ community has a notable presence within video game culture. For LGBTQ+ gamers, sometimes referred to as "gaymers," video games provide a unique space for sexual expression, identity exploration, and community building, offering a degree of freedom and acceptance not always found in the real world.

The video game industry itself has also faced criticism for its gender imbalance. A 2021 survey revealed that 30% of game developers identified as female, and 8% identified as nonbinary or transgender. This gender disparity in the industry can be attributed to a range of factors, including a lack of encouragement for women to pursue careers in game development, negative work environments, and pervasive gender stereotypes that prevent the participation of women and gender-diverse individuals in the field. The marginalization of women and other non-dominant groups within gaming culture and the industry underscores the need for more inclusive representation and opportunities for all gamers.

== Gaming and popular culture ==
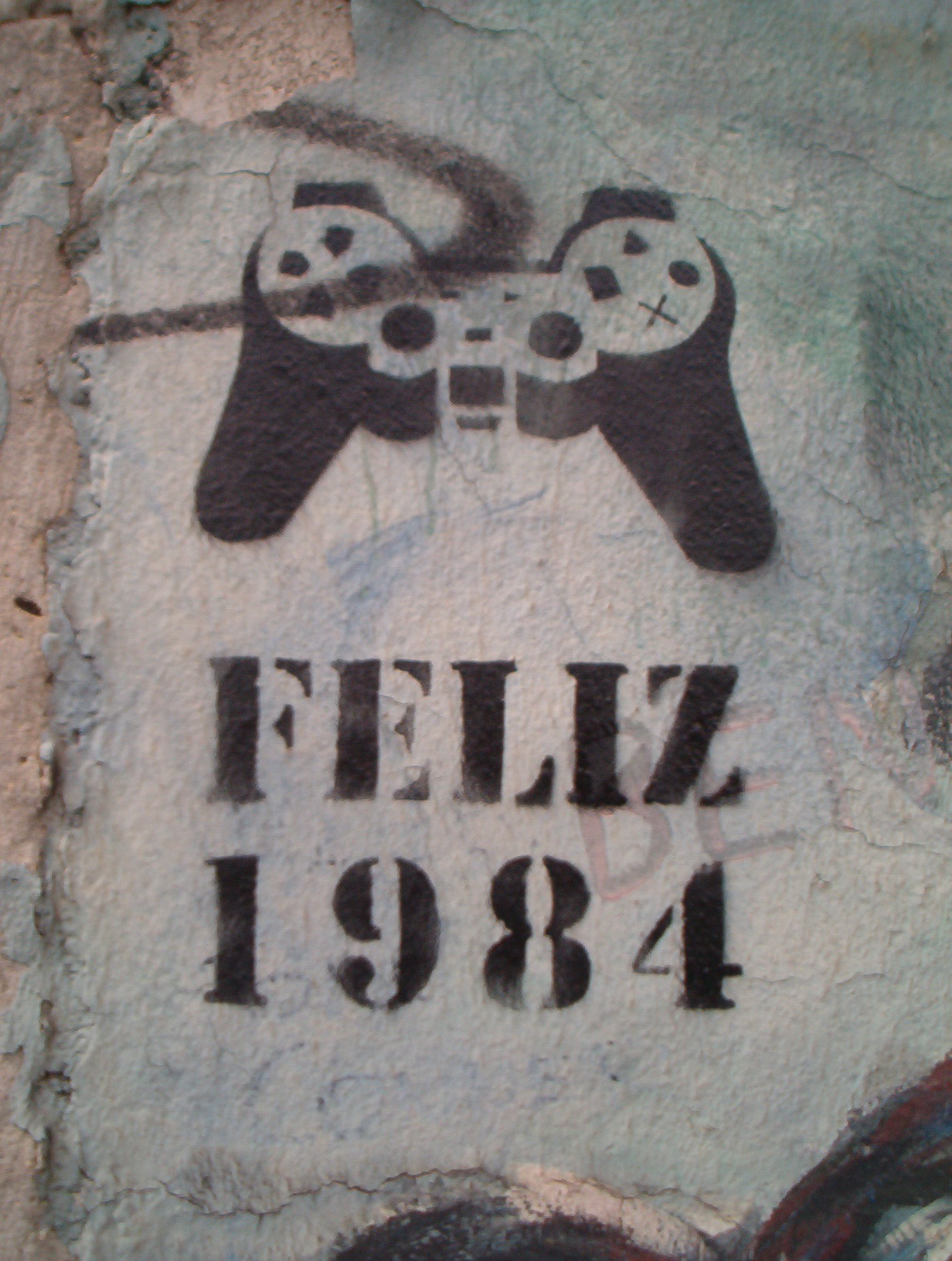
A crossover between video game culture and graffiti culture drawn on a piece of the Berlin Wall

=== Portrayal in media ===
From the 1970s through even the 1990s, video game playing was mostly seen as sub-culture hobby activity and as a substitute for physical sports. However, in its early history video gaming had occasionally caught the attention of the mainstream news outlets. In 1972, Pong became the first video game pop-culture phenomenon. This was followed by Pac-Man in 1980. Other video games labeled as pop-culture phenomena include Final Fantasy, Halo, Metal Gear, The Legend of Zelda, Tomb Raider, Grand Theft Auto, Call of Duty, World of Warcraft, Fortnite, Street Fighter, Mortal Kombat, Pokémon, Guitar Hero, Sonic the Hedgehog, and the Mario games.

As video games grew in popularity, controversies and arguments around games arose, spanning back to 1971. When Mortal Kombat debuted, particularly with its home video game console released on the Genesis and Super NES platforms; due to the media's outrage regarding the game's violent content, strict content guidelines, the system's version of Mortal Kombat was substantially re-worked to remove any 'extreme' violence, turning the blood green and giving the game a rating of mature. 1993's Doom caused quite a stir, with its detailed 3D graphics and copious amounts of blood and gore.

In response to these issues, the ESRB was established to help customers make informed decisions regarding the game content's appropriateness. In the 1999 Columbine shootings, violent video games came under fire with politicians questioning the relation of violent behavior with playing video games, stating "the answer is unclear."

Due to Grand Theft Auto's extreme violence and mature themes, the games throughout the years would create a variety of different controversies.

=== Television channels ===
The first video game TV show was GamePro TV. The first television channel dedicated to video games and culture, G4, was launched in 2002. However, over the years, the channel has moved away from video game shows, and more towards male-oriented programs. X-Play, one of the channel's most popular shows and the highest-rated video game review show, is still produced at G4 until it was bought by Esquire Magazine, who decided to cease X-Play and focus less on the video game oriented audience of G4 and go with their traditional, more general male audience of their magazine. Ginx TV is an international multi-language video game television channel, managed by the former MTV Networks Europe managing director Michiel Bakker. There are also video game shows that appear on other channels, such as Spike TV, Fuel TV, and MTV.

In Korea, there are two cable TV channels fully dedicated to video games, Ongamenet and MBCGame, broadcasting professional game leagues that are held in Korea.

In Germany most shows and channels dedicated to video games were canceled, although the content was highly appreciated by the video game audience. There was one digital cable and satellite channel with a focus on video games, which was closed in 2009: GIGA Television. Some of the hosts also did their show Game One dedicated to games on the German MTV channel until canceled 2014. The show is quite famous for their sketches on games and video game culture in Germany. The unofficial successor is the YouTube show Game Two, financed by public-service broadcasting program funk and produced by the 24/7 online channel Rocket Beans TV, which is dedicated to video game, nerd and pop culture. A similar show was "Reload"; produced for the public-service channel EinsPlus until the channel was announced to close in 2014. The Franco-German TV network arte has a show dedicated to video game culture: Art of Gaming

In Australia one TV show is based on video games and games: Good Game on the ABC (Australian Broadcasting Corporation) which broadcasts on channel ABC2. The show is also available as a podcast on iTunes.

In Russia there is one satellite, the "Perviy Igrovoy" (Gaming First) and one cable, "Gameplay TV", video game TV channels. Channels have Internet streams.

=== Web series ===
Angry Video Game Nerd is a show about a fictional character created by James Rolfe. The character is portrayed as a foul-mouthed, short-tempered retro gamer who reviews old video games usually sarcastically and negatively with frequent use of profanity for comical effect.

Pure Pwnage was a fictional series chronicling the life and adventures of Jeremy, a self-proclaimed "pro gamer".

Red vs. Blue (made by Rooster Teeth), is a machinima (machine-cinema) filmed with the Halo series of games. The series consist of hundreds of short episodes taking place in their own Halo based universe.

Consolevania, a game review/sketch show produced in Glasgow, Scotland, was developed into a broadcast series, videoGaiden on BBC Scotland.

The Guild is a web series, created by Felicia Day, in which the cast are members of a guild that plays an MMORPG similar to World of Warcraft.

Game Grumps, a show on YouTube in which the cast plays games sent in by viewers. It has a related show called Steam Train where the cast plays games either on Steam or sent in by independent developers.

=== Influences on music ===
Video game music has been used by popular musicians in many ways. The earliest example was the electronic music band Yellow Magic Orchestra's self-titled album, released in 1978, which used Space Invaders samples as instrumentation. In turn, the band would have a major influence on much of the video game music produced during the 8-bit and 16-bit eras. During the golden age of arcade video games in the early 1980s, it became common for arcade game sounds and bleeps to be used, particularly in early hip hop music, synthpop, and electro music. Buckner & Garcia's Pac-Man Fever, released in 1982, featured songs that were both about famous arcade games like Pac-Man, Donkey Kong and Berzerk, and also used the sound samples from the games themselves as instrumentation.

In 1984, former Yellow Magic Orchestra member Harry Hosono produced an album entirely from Namco arcade game samples, entitled Video Game Music. Sampling of video game music and sound effects to construct a melody has also become an increasingly common practice within modern hip hop music; examples include Donkey Kong Country 2's Haunted Chase being used in Drake's 6 God and Persona 4's Never More being used in Logic's Welcome to Forever.

Aphex Twin, an experimental electronic artist, under the name "PowerPill" released the Pacman EP in 1992 that featured a heavy use of Pac-Man sound effects. An entire music genre called chiptunes, or sometimes gamewave, have artists dedicated to using the synthesizer sets that came with past video game consoles and computers, particularly the Commodore 64 and the Nintendo Entertainment System. Notable examples of these bands include Mr. Pacman and 8 Bit Weapon. The influence of retro video games on contemporary music can also be seen in the work of less purist "Bitpop" artists, such as Solemn Camel Crew and Anamanaguchi. Moreover, many gamers collect and listen to video game music, ripped from the games themselves. This music is known by its file extension and includes such formats as: SID (Commodore 64), NSF (NES) and SPC (SNES). Cover bands like Minibosses perform their own instrumentations, and groups like the Protomen have written rock operas inspired by the Mega Man video games, while communities like OverClocked ReMix have released thousands of game music arrangements in a variety of genres and have influenced the careers of several game composers.

A comedy subgenre has developed increasing the popularity of several musicians including Jonathan Coulton, famous for the song Still Alive featured in the credits of Valve's Portal, and Jonathan Lewis, songwriter and composer credited with the Half-Life-themed parody album Combine Road.

Full orchestras, such as the Symphonic Game Music Concert tour North America, the United States, and Asia performing symphonic versions of video game songs, particularly the Final Fantasy series, the Metal Gear series, and Nintendo themed music, such as the Mario & Zelda Big Band Live Concert. In Japan, Dragon Quest symphonic concerts are performed yearly, ever since their debut in 1987.

=== Video game and film crossovers ===
==== Films based on video games ====
Examples of films based on video games include Street Fighter, Mortal Kombat, BloodRayne, Doom,Postal, House of the Dead, Alone in the Dark, Resident Evil, Silent Hill, Tomb Raider, Assassin's Creed, and Warcraft.

Until 2019, films based on video games generally had carried a negative connotation for lackluster quality, typically attributed to the difficulties of translating an interactive work to a passive form of entertainment. The commercial and critical success of the films Detective Pikachu and Sonic the Hedgehog in 2019 led to a turnaround for video game adaptions.

==== Movies about video games ====
Hollywood has also created films that are about video games themselves. The golden age of arcade video games in the early 1980s led to several films based around arcade games, including Tron (1982), WarGames (1983), and The Last Starfighter (1984). The Wizard (1989) was notable for featuring the first look at the upcoming game Super Mario Bros. 3 for the Nintendo Entertainment System.

Most films related to video games in the 1990s and 2000s were subsequently adaptions of games, rather than dealing with the medium itself, though the concept of video games remained as a central theme in works like Grandma's Boy (2006), Stay Alive (2006), and Gamer (2009). The 2010s introduced a new way of film which expanded on using video games as virtual world within the film. These include Tron: Legacy (2010, a sequel to the original Tron), Scott Pilgrim vs. the World (2010), Wreck-It Ralph (2012) and its sequel Ralph Breaks the Internet (2018), Pixels (2015), Jumanji: Welcome to the Jungle (2017) and its sequel Jumanji: The Next Level (2019), Ready Player One (2018), Free Guy (2021), Space Jam: A New Legacy (2021), and Tron: Ares (2025).

==== Interactive movies ====
Interactive movies as a computer and video game genre were the result of the multimedia expansion of computers and video game consoles in the mid-1990s, primarily because of the increased capacity offered by the laserdisc format. Interactive movies started on arcade machines in 1983, but quickly expanded to computers and video game consoles such as the Sega CD, the Phillips CD-i and the 3DO Interactive Multiplayer. The games are characterized by more emphasis on cinematic sequences, using full-motion video and voice acting. Interactive movie games have been made in several genres, including adventure games, rail shooters, and role-playing games.

The first interactive movie game was Dragon's Lair, originally released in the arcades in 1983, making it the first game to use a laserdisc and animation by Don Bluth, a man who worked for Disney on features like Robin Hood, The Rescuers, and Pete's Dragon, but later worked for other film companies like United Artists (All Dogs Go to Heaven) and Universal Studios (The Land Before Time). In Dragon's Lair, you control the actions of a daring knight named Dirk, to save a princess from an evil dragon, hence the name of the game. Since the dawn of this exact game, more and more companies have influenced the technology used and decided to make their interactive movie games for arcades and consoles. A more recent Interactive movie title is called 'Bandersnatch'. This movie sets you on a plot of a young 80's programmer named Stefan Butler. The movie lets the viewer choose different plot trajectories for the main character questioning reality throughout the way.

The birth of the 'interactive movie' genre was studded with unimpressive flops, though the genre later came into its own; at the time, video-capture technology was still in its infancy, with short (and often grainy and low-quality) video segments being the norm for games of any length.

== Video game and traditional media forms ==
With the rapid convergence of all media types into a digital form, video games are also beginning to affect, and be affected by traditional media forms.

In history, the Television engineer Ralph Baer, who conceived the idea of an interactive television while building a television set from scratch created the first video game. Video games are now also being exploited by pay-TV companies which allow you to simply attach your computer or console to the television cable system and you can simply download the latest game.

Games act on television, with the player choosing to enter the artificial world. The constructed meanings in video games are more influential than those of traditional media forms. The reason is that 'games interact with the audience in a dialogue of emotion, action, and reaction'. The interactivity means this occurs to a depth that is not possible in the traditional media forms.

Computer games have developed in parallel to both the video game and the arcade video game. The personal computer and console machines such as the Dreamcast, GameCube, PlayStation 2, and Xbox offered a new dimension to game playing. The consoles have now largely been replaced by the Xbox 360, Wii and, the PlayStation 4, and the personal computer is still a leading gaming machine.

Games are the first new computer-based media form to socialize a generation of youth in a way that traditional media forms have in the past. Therefore, the 'MTV generation' has been overtaken by the 'Nintendo generation'; however, some refer to the current generation as the 'iPod Generation'.

Because they straddle the technologies of television and computers, electronic games are a channel through which we can investigate the various impacts of new media and the technologies of convergence.

== Regional variations ==
The cultures of video games in different regions are different because of dissimilar technological infrastructures, policy frameworks, and investment of economies. In Middle East, especially Saudi Arabia, the culture of gaming has grown rapidly with a high level of participation by youths and adoption of mobile gaming. Government initiatives such as the National Gaming and Esports Strategy and major investment programs have contributed to building of infrastructure, creation of jobs, and international esports events, which places the nation as a potential hub of the gaming culture and industry.

These developments illustrate how regional policy and economic investment can shape the evolution of video game culture globally.

== See also ==
- Gamers Outreach Foundation
- Geek culture
- List of books about video games
- List of novels based on video games
- PC Master Race
- Sexism in video gaming
- Social interaction and first-person shooters
- Video game controversy
- Video game journalism
- Cannabis and video game culture
