= Zero Punctuation =

Video-game comedy-review series

- Logo featuring Yahtzee's cartoon avatar
- Genre: Video game reviews, black comedy, insult comedy, satire
- Created by: Ben "Yahtzee" Croshaw
- Theme music composer: Ian Dorsch
- Countries of origin: Australia; United States
- Original language: English
- No. of episodes: 836

Original release
- Network: The Escapist
- Release: July 24, 2007 – November 21, 2023

Zero Punctuation is a video game reviews web series created by the English comedy writer and video game journalist Ben "Yahtzee" Croshaw. From its inception in 2007, episodes were published weekly by internet magazine The Escapist. Episodes typically range from five to six minutes in length. Videos provide caustic humour, rapid-fire delivery, visual gags and critical insight into recently released video games, with occasional reviews of older games and retrospectives of the industry itself. In 2023, Zero Punctuation was discontinued following Croshaw's resignation from The Escapist and the formation of Second Wind, with new reviews being published by him in the same format under the rebranded series Fully Ramblomatic.

== History ==
Prior to Zero Punctuation, Croshaw primarily authored content for his blog, Fullyramblomatic, and would occasionally review video games, often with an emphasis on humor and criticism. In July 2007, Croshaw uploaded two game reviews in video format to YouTube in the same style that would eventually be used for Zero Punctuation: one of the demo of The Darkness for the PlayStation 3, and the other of Fable: The Lost Chapters for the PC. Both were well-received and The Escapist was one of several publishers to offer Croshaw a contract.

The name "Zero Punctuation" refers to the speed of Croshaw's narration. Since its creation, the series has become popular in the gaming community. Video game developers and publishers have occasionally acknowledged Croshaw's reviews of their games, and at least one internet meme has resulted from Zero Punctuation. At the end of each year, starting in 2008, Croshaw created special episodes of Zero Punctuation discussing what he believes were the best and worst games of the year. He occasionally dedicated episodes to new technologies or milestones in video gaming, such as E3 and the coming of the eighth generation of consoles. Croshaw also dedicated certain episodes to covering events or periods in gaming history that he considered to have disparaged the industry or its reputation. These include the video game industry crash of 1983, and the controversial Hot Coffee mod for Grand Theft Auto: San Andreas.

From 2009 to 2017, Croshaw authored a column on The Escapist known as Extra Punctuation. These articles were originally published every Tuesday and often supplemented the previous week's review by discussing a certain topic or trend exhibited by that game. Croshaw resumed the series in 2021 in video format.

On November 6, 2023, Croshaw announced he had resigned from The Escapist with other colleagues out of solidarity following the firing of editor-in-chief Nick Calandra that same day. He also confirmed that he did not own the rights to Zero Punctuation, leaving the future of the series in doubt. Two days later, on November 8, Calandra and Croshaw announced that Croshaw would continue making weekly short-form reviews under the title of Fully Ramblomatic. This show is hosted on Second Wind, a new outlet formed by the staff who left The Escapist. The Escapist's parent company Gamurs published the final two episodes of Zero Punctuation—reviews of Sonic Superstars and Marvel's Spider-Man 2—on November 21.

== Format ==
Typical Zero Punctuation imagery, illustrating Croshaw's confusion with obtaining spaceship fuel in Starbound

In Zero Punctuation, Croshaw usually reviews a game in a highly critical manner using rapid-fire speech delivery accompanied by minimalistic cartoon imagery and animation on a distinctive yellow background, which illustrates what is being said or provides an ironic counterpoint to it. Subtle references or jokes may be inserted to the visuals for comic effect or to add additional context to the narration. His reviews are intended to be humorous with constant usage of puns, analogies, metaphors, and dark humour accompanied by frequent use of profanity. Croshaw usually substitutes the main character or himself with his own avatar, a cartoon man distinguished by a trilby, with other cartoon people in the same style representing the main characters in a video game, celebrities, video game programmers, or friends of Croshaw. Another character used often is an imp-like creature (originally meant to resemble a "darkling" from The Darkness) which represents antagonists, animals, children, or less important characters from a game. Video games, developers, countries, and other entities are often anthropomorphized as box arts, logos, or flags, respectively, with arms and legs. Croshaw often allegorizes jokes, game details, or video game industry activities with references to, or commentaries on popular culture, politics, and history.

Zero Punctuation opens and closes with a theme song, a rock track composed and performed by Ian Dorsch. The ending credits usually feature humorous notes or other information relating to the review, as well as imagery of characters from the review engaging in slapstick. Prior to mid-2008, Zero Punctuation featured commercial songs at the beginning and end of each episode, which were usually related to the context of, or at odds with the game in question, such as the Ramones' "I Wanna Be Sedated" and Eric Johnson's "Cliffs of Dover" at the beginning and end, respectively, of his review of Guitar Hero III: Legends of Rock.

The series' format has proved inspirational for several other web series, such as the critical and educational series Extra Credits and CGP Grey.

== Critical style ==
Croshaw provides highly critical reviews of games, usually pointing out the faults that he implies other professional reviewers ignore in high-profile releases. He tends to disdain certain tropes and conventions in video games he feels have been overused, such as quick time events, highly common uses of motion controls, cover-based shooting, crafting systems, and an unbalanced emphasis on graphics over story or gameplay. Similarly, he has expressed cynicism of the prevalence of specific game designs, including military-themed first-person shooters for being very similar in gameplay, poor in ethics, and contrived in story; open-world games including crafting, collectibles, and stealth mechanics that he feels bloats a game's content; cinematic games that consist of linear, uneventful sections separated by action sequences and brief exploration; and live service games with repetitive gameplay that incorporates grinding to unlock new content. He also disapproves of game franchises that release sequels in rapid succession, such as Final Fantasy, Assassin's Creed, and Call of Duty. Croshaw generally does not review certain genres of games, such as sports and racing games, and has openly admitted to not liking most JRPGs, real-time strategy games, fighting games, or simulation games.

Certainly I focus on the bad, because I reckon plenty of sources focus on the good already. Happily, the bad is also easier to make funny.

— Croshaw on a Reddit "Ask me Anything" thread in 2011

Although Zero Punctuation episodes are usually intended to highlight Croshaw's criticisms of video games, his opinions are not universally negative, and any positive feelings towards the aspects of a game will usually be explicitly stated. During his review of Portal, he admitted to being unable to find any faults with the game. He opened his review of BioShock by saying "nobody likes it when I'm being nice to a game," referring to the negative reception of his favorable review of Psychonauts.

Croshaw cites the work of British television critic and PC Zone journalist Charlie Brooker as the "main inspiration" for his own reviewing style, as well as the writings of Douglas Adams, Sean "Seanbaby" Riley, Victor Lewis-Smith, and Old Man Murray's Chet Faliszek and Erik Wolpaw. He expressed respect towards the late Roger Ebert, noting that he "might one day aspire to being his videogaming equivalent".

== Games of the Year ==
From 2008, Croshaw created annual, year-end episodes of Zero Punctuation which enumerate his favorite and least favorite games from that year. For 2008 and 2009, mock "awards" were given for games based on arbitrarily defined categories. Starting in 2010, the "awards" format was replaced with ordered lists of his five favorite and least favorite games of the year. For 2015, he added a new category for his choices of the blandest and least innovative games of the year. To commemorate the end of the 2010s, Croshaw ranked in order of preference the best and worst games he had awarded during the decade.

In his 2013 lists, he awarded the "Lifetime Achievement Award for Total Abhorrence" to Ride to Hell: Retribution, expressing that it was so poor in quality that he hardly considered it a game but rather saw it as "congealed failure."

Best Game of the Year
Year	Game	Notes
2008	Saints Row 2	Given award as "The 'Copulating Jelly Baby' Award for Fucking Sweet Game"
2009	Batman: Arkham Asylum	Given award as "The Golden Dog Biscuit Award for Genuinely Best Game"
2010	Just Cause 2	9th Best of the 2010s
2011	Portal 2	2nd Best of the 2010s
2012	Spec Ops: The Line	7th Best of the 2010s
2013	BioShock Infinite	8th Best of the 2010s Retroactively replaced by Papers, Please
2014	Middle-earth: Shadow of Mordor	10th Best of the 2010s Retroactively replaced by Wolfenstein: The New Order
2015	Undertale	Best Game of the 2010s
2016	Doom	4th Best of the 2010s
2017	Resident Evil 7: Biohazard	5th Best of the 2010s
2018	Return of the Obra Dinn	3rd Best of the 2010s
2019	Disco Elysium	6th Best of the 2010s
2020	Spiritfarer	
2021	Psychonauts 2	
2022	Neon White	

Worst Game of the Year
Year	Game(s)	Notes
2008	Sonic Unleashed	Given award as "The "Turd in a Turd" Award for Unsurprising Poor Quality"
2009	Wet	Given award as "The Cement Block On A Racecourse Award for Biggest Non Starter"
2010	Kane & Lynch 2: Dog Days	6th Worst of the 2010s
2011	Battlefield 3 and Call of Duty: Modern Warfare 3 (tie)	10th Worst of the 2010s
2012	Amy	2nd Worst of the 2010s
2013	Call of Duty: Ghosts	8th Worst of the 2010s
2014	Thief	9th Worst of the 2010s
2015	The Order: 1886	5th Worst of the 2010s
2016	Homefront: The Revolution	4th Worst of the 2010s
2017	Sniper Ghost Warrior 3	7th Worst of the 2010s
2018	Hunt Down the Freeman	Worst Game of the 2010s
2019	Contra: Rogue Corps	3rd Worst of the 2010s
2020	The Last of Us Part II	
2021	Balan Wonderworld	
2022	Five Nights at Freddy's: Security Breach	

Blandest Game of the Year
Year	Game(s)	Notes
2015	Halo 5: Guardians	
2016	No Man's Sky	
2017	Star Wars Battlefront II	
2018	Conan Exiles	
2019	Anthem	
2020	Marvel's Avengers	
2021	Medal of Honor: Above and Beyond	
2022	Saints Row	

== Reception ==
In his 2008 review of The Witcher, Croshaw sarcastically referred to the PC gaming community as "the glorious PC gaming master race", intending to criticize the perceived elitist attitudes in that community. The phrase has since become an internet meme, and has been appropriated and championed by that community. In a 2018 review of Kingdom Come: Deliverance, Croshaw explained that he regretted calling the community "PC master race" instead of "dick-slurp all-stars," citing a continuation of the behavior that originally prompted the term.

Croshaw's negative review of Super Smash Bros. Brawl in 2008 was poorly received by fans of the game. He claimed to have received a disproportionate amount of hate mail following the review, and dedicated an episode to highlight and respond to various e-mails that he had allegedly received in response to it.

In 2009, Croshaw reviewed Prototype by comparing it to InFamous, attempting to decide which game was better. Unable to determine a victor, he jokingly suggested that the developers of each game send him artwork of the opposing game's main character wearing lingerie in order to claim the award. Radical Entertainment and Sucker Punch – the respective developers – unexpectedly complied with the challenge, prompting Croshaw to declare InFamous the winner after judging the quality of the images.

In 2013, Croshaw came under fire after an episode of Zero Punctuation on Papers, Please contained a metaphor that was viewed as transphobic. Croshaw agreed with the criticism and apologized, expressing regret towards making the statement. The offending remark was retroactively omitted from the video.

Croshaw was one of the founders of the Mana Bar, a video gaming lounge in Brisbane that operated from 2010 until 2015. Croshaw's popularity through Zero Punctuation has been credited with the initial success of the establishment.
