= Wet (video game) =

2009 video game

WET
- The game's cover art features protagonist Rubi Malone
- Developer: Artificial Mind & Movement
- Publisher: Bethesda Softworks
- Director: Patrick Fortier
- Producers: Philip DeRosa; Stéphanie Marchand
- Designer: Ashraf Ismail
- Programmer: Philippe Leblanc
- Artist: Jean-François Mignault
- Writer: Duppy Demetrius
- Composer: Brian LeBarton
- Engine: Gaia
- Platforms: PlayStation 3 Xbox 360
- Release: NA: September 15, 2009; EU: September 18, 2009; AU: October 1, 2009
- Genres: Third-person shooter, action
- Mode: Single-player

Wet is a 2009 third-person shooter action game, developed by Artificial Mind & Movement and published by Bethesda Softworks for the PlayStation 3 and Xbox 360. A PlayStation Portable version was planned, but ultimately cancelled.

Wet's gameplay revolves around killing opponents with both firearms and swords while engaging in acrobatic moves. In its story and setting, Wet follows heroine Rubi Malone (voiced by actress Eliza Dushku), a "problem-solver". Wet's title derives from the euphemism "wet work" – a messy job or task that involves one's hands becoming wet with blood.

Originally set to be published by Sierra Entertainment, Bethesda Softworks eventually announced that they would become Wet's publisher. The game received mixed reviews from critics, garnering praise for its gameplay, music, and production values, but was criticized for its graphics, levels, and lack of innovation. It sold 1 million units. A sequel to the game was announced in 2011, but was cancelled.

== Gameplay ==
Wet is an action game that combines shooting and swordplay with acrobatics and gore. The main character, Rubi, carries twin pistols and a sword (she can also carry dual shotguns, submachine guns, or crossbows), and can fire while jumping, sliding on her knees, and running on walls. During these acrobatic actions, the game enters slow motion, and she will automatically aim at a second enemy, allowing the player to shoot at two enemies at once. She can also combine her attacks, such as wall running off a person or performing a sword uppercut while sliding. Racking up kills and collecting multiplier icons gains multipliers, which increase score and the rate at which Rubi regenerates health. Rubi can also regain health by finding bottles of whiskey.

In some sections of the game, Rubi's face will get covered in blood and she will go into a murderous, berserker-like rage. These sections are presented in noir style, with bold red, black and white visuals. Rubi's attacks become faster and stronger to fight against large numbers of enemies during these sections, and killing chains of enemies extends her psychotic fury. There are also motorway sections that feature shooting integrated with quick time events.

At the end of each stage of play, the player will be graded on three different factors: Completion Time, Acrobatics, and Average Multiplier. Based on performance in these areas, Style Points will be given, allowing the purchase of upgrades to both Rubi and her weapons. Different upgrades include additional health blocks for Rubi, as well as increased firing rate and damage for the pistols, shotguns, submachine guns, and crossbows.

== Plot ==
Rubi Malone (Eliza Dushku) is a "problem-solver": a bounty hunter and general mercenary. In the game's prologue, she is hired to retrieve a briefcase that is hijacked by a gang. She does so, leaving numerous dead gang members in her wake, and delivers the case to a hospital. It turns out to contain a human heart, which a powerful man named William Ackers (William Morgan Sheppard) needs to survive. Rubi delivers the case to Ackers's grateful son, collects her fee, and departs.

One year later, Mr. Ackers approaches Rubi in her Texas hideout and hires her to go to Hong Kong to bring back his son, whom Mr. Ackers says has fallen in with a bad crowd. Rubi flies to Hong Kong and consults with a local friend, Ming (James Sie), who tells her that Ackers is heading up a powerful drug ring. Rubi, with difficulty, kidnaps the younger Ackers and delivers him to his father in London.

However, the "William Ackers" who hired Rubi turns out to be an imposter and a rival of the real Ackers. His bodyguards decapitate Ackers's son, then stab Rubi and leave her for dead. Rubi recovers with the help of a friend, Milo, and vengefully starts to track down the fake Ackers and his gang.

On a tip from Milo, Rubi does a favor for a shady woman named Kafka, performing a theft of a rare book being shipped to the British Museum. Kafka puts her on the trail of "Ackers", who is really a drug lord named Rupert Pelham (Malcolm McDowell). The trail leads Rubi back to Hong Kong and then to London again, where she is captured by Pelham's subordinate, Sorrell (Alan Cumming), and tortured for information. Rubi manages to overpower her captors and escape, and kills Sorrell, but not before he confesses that Pelham is moving in on the real Ackers that night.

Rubi confronts Pelham at Ackers's mansion, just as William Ackers is about to be killed. Rubi duels and kills Pelham's chief bodyguard, Tarantula (Kim Mai Guest), by snapping her neck, then decapitates Pelham. Ackers says that Rubi delivered his son to his death, albeit unknowingly. He cannot bring himself to forgive her, but her actions that night are enough for him to refrain from taking vengeance on her. Rubi accepts this and leaves, pocketing a small stack of cash that Pelham threw at her to try to save himself.

Before the credits roll, there is a close-up of Tarantula, whose hand twitches.

== Development and release ==
On July 29, 2008, Activision Blizzard announced that Wet had been dropped along with many other games, thus putting its future into hiatus – though according to Behaviour, the project would not be canceled completely because Wet had come so far along in development. In November 2008, at the Montreal International Game Summit, Artistic Technical Director David Lightbown announced that Wet would be released in 2009.

On April 24, 2009, Famitsu and Amazon indicated that Bethesda Softworks would be publishing Wet. On April 27, 2009, Bethesda Softworks confirmed that they would publish Wet. A demo of the game was released on the PlayStation Network and Xbox Live Marketplace on August 22, 2009. The game was released for PlayStation 3 and Xbox 360 in September 2009 in North America and Europe, and in October in Australia.

Original music for the game was composed by Brian LeBarton plus a list of rockabilly groups and Flamenco Rock n Roll pioneers Gypsy Pistoleros, who contributed 4 tracks to the soundtrack. The entire score was recorded live in four days in Los Angeles with a musical cast that included Carla Azar from Autolux, Motown drummer James Gadson, Shawn Davis on bass, Justin Stanley on guitar, Davey Chegwidden on percussion and Elizabeth and Chris Lea on trombone and saxophone. Brian is quoted as saying, "I wanted music that would scare the shit out of you, make you feel like you're in the game. It had to put you on edge and freak your brain out. Face-melting, musical debauchery."

== Reception ==
Reception

Aggregate score
Aggregator	Score	
Aggregator	PS3	Xbox 360
Metacritic	70/100	69/100

Review scores
Publication	Score	
Publication	PS3	Xbox 360
Destructoid	7.5/10	N/A
Edge	N/A	5/10
Eurogamer	N/A	7/10
Famitsu	30/40	N/A
Game Informer	7.5/10	7.5/10
GamePro	3.5/5	3.5/5
GameRevolution	B−	B−
GameSpot	7.5/10	7.5/10
GameTrailers	N/A	6.3/10
GameZone	7.5/10	7.5/10
Giant Bomb	3/5	3/5
IGN	(AU) 7.4/10 (US) 6.6/10	(AU) 7.4/10 (US) 6.6/10
Official Xbox Magazine (US)	N/A	7/10
PlayStation: The Official Magazine	3/5	N/A
411Mania	N/A	6.6/10
The A.V. Club	N/A	B

=== Critical reception ===
Wet received "mixed or average" reviews from critics, according to review aggregator website Metacritic. GameSpot praised the game's mechanics and soundtrack, but noted that the visuals are a bit rough and awkward. These sentiments were echoed by Eurogamer and Official Xbox Magazine UK who both observed that the exploitation design ethic failed to conceal the game's dated visuals, but both also said that the game – and the character of Rubi – possessed sufficient charm to make it worth playing. PixlBit said that it "has its issues, but its Tarantino-esque style makes it a raucous romp." IT Reviews noted that "it isn't a particularly original game, with bits and pieces borrowed from everywhere", but also said "it's well executed riotous blasting all the way, and it left us with an undeniable grin on our faces the majority of the time."

Edge was more scathing, commenting: "Some cool things happen to crazy people in A2M's Wet, but unfortunately there are times in between where you're actually expected to play it." Ben "Yahtzee" Croshaw, who hosts the online show Zero Punctuation, described the main character of Rubi being "as likable and sympathetic as a deepsea anglerfish in an SS uniform." In Japan, where the PlayStation 3 version was ported for release on September 17, 2009, Famitsu gave it a score of two sevens and two eights for a total of 30 out of 40.

=== Sales ===
Wet sold over 1 million units.

== Cancelled sequel ==
On November 8, 2010, a sequel was announced by Behaviour Interactive (formerly Artificial Mind and Movement), but rumors of its cancellation began on May 17, 2011, when an employee listed the project as canceled on their LinkedIn profile. Also, Bethesda Softworks, publishers of Wet, stated that they would not be the publishers of the sequel.
