= These Hands of Mine =

Studio album by Mr. Quintron
- Released: 1998
- Genre: Alternative rock
- Label: Skin Graft Records
- Producer: Steve Moller

Mr. Quintron chronology
Satan is Dead (1998)	These Hands of Mine (1998)	Unmasked Organ Light-Year of Infinity Man (2000)

Professional ratings
Review scores
Source	Rating
Allmusic	4/5 stars

'These Hands of Mine' is an album by Mr. Quintron, released on November 17, 1998, by Skin Graft Records. It was recorded in New Orleans, Los Angeles, and Memphis, Tennessee by Mr. Quintron and Steve Moller at Cotton Row. According to Quintron's official site, there are stories about the recording of this album which cannot ever be repeated. A young girl almost lost her life and a young man almost went to jail for murder.

== Track listing ==
'Side A'

1. "Sound of a Train" - 1:19
2. "Meet Me at the Club House" (The Champs) - 3:11
3. "Dungeon Master" - 5:10
4. "It's Moving Me" (Violinaires) - 4:15
5. "Wild Indians" - 5:40
6. "Drum Buddy [Sample Song-Rock]" - 2:21

'Side B'

1. "Grandfather Time" - 5:00
2. "MZ Exotic WLD [For S. A'Dair]" - 4:32
3. "Caveman 5000" - 3:37
4. "The Creeper" - 4:55
5. "Jealousy" (Traditional) - 1:51

== Credits ==
- Quintron - Hammond model D electric organ, Hammond Sounder, Drum machine, Drum Buddy, Mouth Machine, vocals
- Miss Pussycat - Shakers, Tambourine, backup vocals
- Velocity Hopkins - Chainsaw sound
