= Quintron =

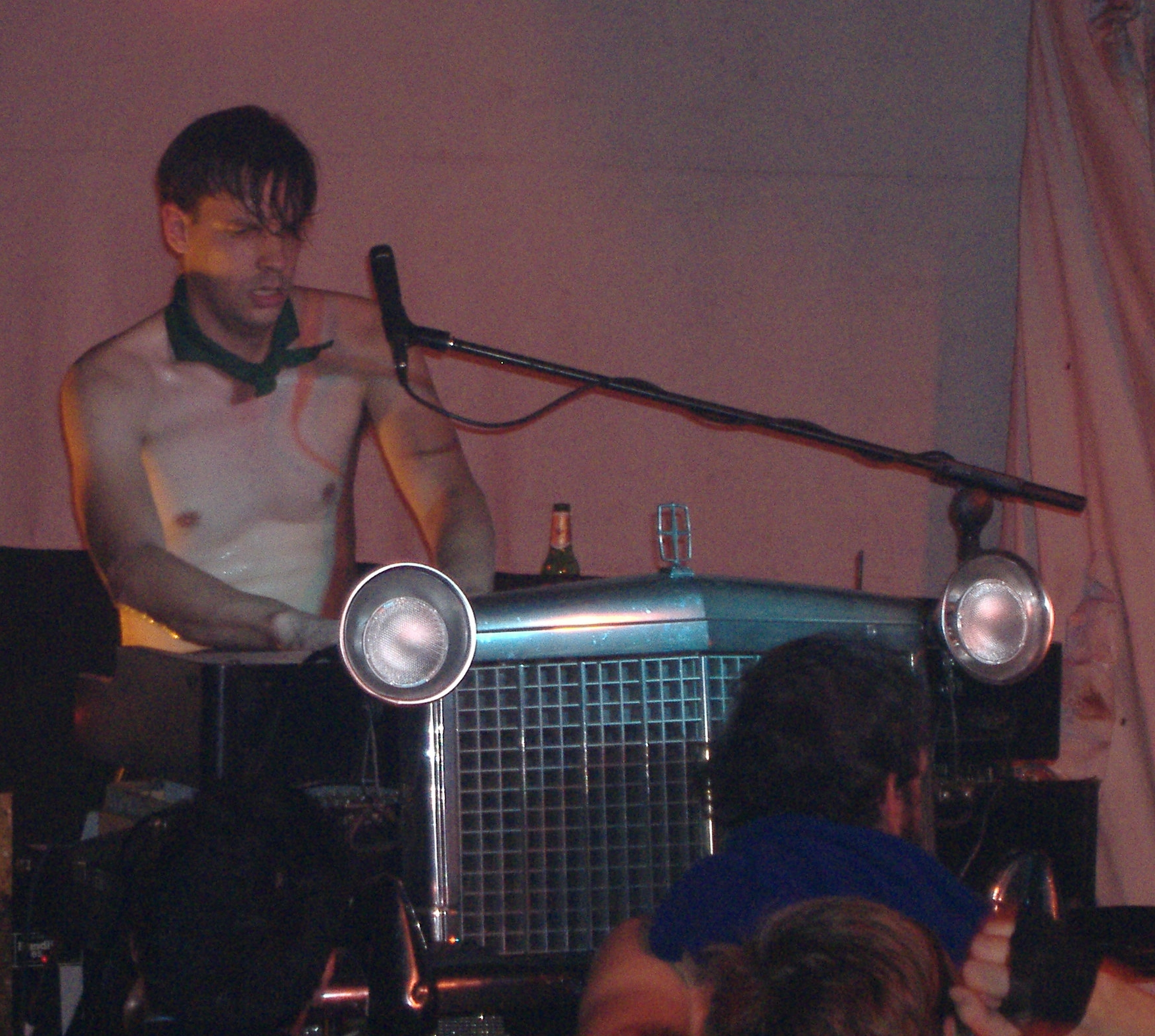
- Quintron in concert

Background information
- Born: Robert Rolston; Germany
- Genres: Rock, alternative rock, indie rock, noise rock
- Occupation: Musician
- Years active: 1990–present
- Labels: Bulb, Crypt, Skin Graft, Rhinestone, Three One G, Tigerbeat6

Quintron (real name Robert Rolston; born c. 1967 in Germany) is an American musician and one-man-band. He is a nightclub organist and inventor, who has patented a number of his own inventions and often performs at his own private club, the Spellcaster Lodge in New Orleans. He frequently performs with his wife, musician and puppeteer Panacea Pussycat (also known as Miss Pussycat), co-founder of the 9th Ward's defunct Pussycat Caverns.

== Music ==
Quintron is a multi-instrumental one-man-band. During performances, Quintron utilizes a custom-made Hammond organ/Fender Rhodes synthesizer combo which he has had outfitted to resemble the body of a car, complete with working headlights and a Louisiana license plate which reads "Quintron". Quintron is often accompanied by The Drum Buddy, a rotating, light-activated analog synthesizer, one of many which he has created and manufactured himself.

Quintron is regularly accompanied by his wife Miss Pussycat, who sings backup and plays maracas.

== Inventions ==
Quintron has invented a number of innovative musical devices. His first invention was called the 'Spit Machine' a hand organ which used saliva as a tuning conductor. Describing how the apparatus works, Quintron explains that "You had to spit on a stick, like a paint stir stick, and you had two metal leads that you would touch to either end of the line of spit and then you would move the leads closer together - higher pitch - and farther apart - lower pitch. The weird thing is that, the way I built the oscillator, spit was the only thing that I could use as a conducter (sic). Lemon juice was too conductive, water not enough, etc. You actually had a lot of control over the pitch with spit - it wasn’t too sensitive - and could really play it in tune like a real organ. There was also some resistive quality to human spit that gave the oscillator some weird overtones too."

His next invention was called the 'Disco Light Machine,' a device which, in his own words, was a "system of pick-ups that you would attach to a drum kit and the sound of the drums would light up a light inside a darkened box and this light would activate electronic sounds to go along with the drums - the harder you played the drums, the brighter the light and the louder the electronic sounds."

His most notable instrument, however, is the 'Drum Buddy'. The Drum Buddy is a mechanically rotating, five-oscillator, light-activated drum machine which can either be set to play automatically, or manipulated to create a number of different sound effects. The drum buddy has its own informercial, The Drum Buddy Show, which includes a number of guest appearances and performances by artists such as Quintron, Miss Pussycat, Ernie K-Doe, MC Trachiotomy, and the Drum Buddy Dancers.

Quintron subsequently released a non musical invention called the Bath Buddy which is a water-level sensor designed to tell you when your bath is full. It runs off a 9v battery.

== Private life and public image ==
Quintron is very enigmatic about his personal life and rarely grants interviews. It is known that he was born September 15, in Bitburg, West Germany, where his father was stationed in the military. He grew up in Mobile, Alabama, and St. Louis, Missouri, before completing high school and moving to Chicago at the age of seventeen. He attended Loyola University and was an active member of the Theatre Department before transferring to DePaul University. While in Chicago he played in a cover band called Idol Chatter, and eventually joined the Chicago experimental trio MATH with Jodie Mechanic and Michael Colligan. During his time in Chicago he opened his first club, Milk of Burgundy.

It was in New Orleans that he first met Panacea Pussycat, then-owner of the now-defunct Pussycat Caverns. While in New Orleans he founded his own club, the Spellcaster Lodge, which was severely damaged by Hurricane Katrina. 9th Ward Breakdown, a song he had written several years prior to Katrina, predicted the human cost of the disaster with uncanny accuracy. The Spellcaster Lodge was reopened in September 2006.

Mr. Quintron is known for his eccentric behavior. In 1996, during an interview for a Times-Picayune article, he told interviewer Bill Grady that he and his wife were first cousins. He also conducted the interview in a wheelchair, explaining that he had fallen from a roller coaster while at Six Flags over Mid-America. In an interview with Odyssey Magazine, Quintron qualified his unusual demeanor and explained his attitude towards the press, remarking; "I am aware that this interview is a game and I can step outside of this page to see it for what it is. You know, I may never say what I have just said in another interview ever. I can be inconsistent, unreliable, contradictory... like electricity or plumbing."

== Discography ==
=== Splits ===
- Split 7" with Flossie and The Unicorns (Bulb Records, 1996, BLB-044)
- Science In the Shape of Birds 7" with XBXRX, Bobby Conn, Zeek Sheck (GSL Records, 2000)
- Mardi Gras! 7" with XBXRX (Gold Standard Laboratories, 2001, G§L 49)
- Split 7" with Sick Lipstick featuring XBXRX (GSL Records, 2002)

=== EPs ===
- We've Got Each Other 12" EP (Horseglue Records, 2003)
- Jamskate EP (Rhinestone Records, 2007)

=== Albums ===
- Internal Feedback 001-011 LP (Bulb Records, 1994, BLB-039) (Out of Print)
- The Amazing Spellcaster (Live from the Pussycat Caverns) LP (Bulb Records, 1996, BLB-049) (Out of Print)
- The First Two Records CD (Bulb Records, 1996, BLB-049) (Out of Print)
- ...Play 9 Songs with Mr Quintron (Crypt Records, 1997)
- Satan Is Dead LP/CD (Bulb Records, 1998, BLB-052) (Out of Print)
- These Hands of Mine LP/CD (Rhinestone Records/Skin Graft Records, 1999, Rhinestone 003/GR57)
- Unmasked Organ Light-Year of Infinity Man LP/CD (Bulb Records, 2000, BLB-072) (Out of Print)
- Drum Buddy Demo LP Vol. 1 CD (Skin Graft Records/Rhinestone Records, 2001)
- Are You Ready For An Organ Solo? CD (Three One G Records, 2003)
- The Frog Tape LP (Skin Graft Records, 2004, GR72)
- Swamp Tech/Electric Swamp LP/CD/DVD Set - (Tigerbeat6 Records/Rhinestone Records (Vinyl), 2005)
- Too Thirsty 4 Love LP/CD/MP3 - (Rhinestone Records/Goner Records, 42GONE, 2008)
- Sucre Du Sauvage LP (Goner Records, 2011)
- Spellcaster II - Death In Space LP (Pizza Burglar Records, 2011)
- Erotomania - Quintron at the Chamberlin LP (Mind Meld Records, 2019, MM-002)
- Goblin Alert! (Goner Records, 2020)

=== Other appearances ===
- "Silent Night" and "Jingle Bell Rock" (with Miss Pussycat) on Psych-Out Christmas (Cleopatra Records, 2013)

Mr. Quintron's first two records on Bulb were initially released on vinyl only, in very small quantities, and are now very hard to find. They were re-issued in the Bulb Gold Re-issue series on CD, but are now out of print as well. Quintron's other Bulb releases were released on vinyl and CD at the time of release, but are now out of print as well, and the CDs are harder to find than the Bulb Gold Re-Issue CDs of his first two albums (more copies were pressed of the Bulb Gold Re-Issue albums).

The album The First Two Records is somewhat of an oddity, because although tracks from the first two records are present, compilation tracks and guitar solos are more prevalent. Also, a set track listing is not actually known. Bulb owner Pete Larson was asked, and said that there is no track list for the album. When asked about the track listing, Quintron said "yea...that is a Bulb records budget re-issue. I submitted different stuff for the re-issue but the just listed the first two lps track listing. I doubt they even listened to it before release. sorry to say that I don't even know the track listing so it will remain a mystery.......Q".
