= PC Master Race =

Tongue-in-cheek term of superiority for PC gaming

PC Master Race (PCMR), or in its original phrasing Glorious PC Gaming Master Race, is an internet meme, subculture and a tongue-in-cheek term used within video game culture to describe the grandiosity and god complex associated with PC gamers when comparing themselves to console gamers.

In current parlance, the term is commonly used by computer enthusiasts both to proudly proclaim themselves as an elitist gamer group, as well as a humorous self-parody of their own firm belief in the technical supremacy of personal computers as a video gaming platform over video game consoles such as PlayStation and Xbox, often citing gaming PC features like high-end graphics, higher frame rates, more precise gameplay control (especially with first-person shooters), free online play, wider variety of downloadable games, backward compatibility, better modifiability, upgradability and customization, lower cost-over-time, open standards, multitasking and overall superior performance. Popular imagery, discussion and media referencing the term also commonly belittles gamers who prefer playing consoles as "dirty console peasants", and describes people who prefer playing PC as the "PC master race".

== History ==
=== Creation ===
What quickly becomes obvious is that Witcher is very much a PC-exclusive game, which are typically designed to be as complex and unintuitive as possible so that those dirty console-playing peasants don't ruin it for the glorious PC-gaming master race.

— Ben Croshaw

In 2008, game critic Ben "Yahtzee" Croshaw employed the comedically extreme term "Glorious PC Gaming Master Race" in a Zero Punctuation video-review for the role-playing game The Witcher for the online gaming magazine The Escapist. Croshaw explained that his initial intent in referencing Nazi Germany's master race ideology when he coined the intense term Glorious PC Gaming Master Race was to poke fun at an elitist attitude he perceived among some of The Witcher's PC playerbase at the time of The Witcher's release, who had complained about the PC release of the game being possibly negatively affected by the console port of the game:

"It was intended to be ironic, to illustrate what I perceived at the time to be an elitist attitude among a certain kind of PC gamer. People who invest in expensive gaming PCs and continually spend money to make sure the tech in their brightly-lit tower cases is up to date. Who actually prefer games that are temperamental to get running and that have complicated keyboard interfaces, just because it discourages new or 'casual' players who will in some way taint the entire community with their presence. I meant it as a dig."

=== Reappropriation ===
In April 2011 I grabbed it [the expression] and changed its original meaning, creating a subreddit dedicated to the glory that is to play (and not only) on PC. ... we're a serious group dedicated to the serious and clear advantages of PC over other work and gaming devices, whose only and arguable advantage are artificial restrictions put in place so as to squeeze gamers out of their money.

— Reddit user pedro19, creator of the /r/PCMasterRace subreddit

The term caught on quickly, but with a different meaning than originally implied by Ben Croshaw. It is now being used as an expression of pride among PC gamers, who view their PC platform as superior to traditional video game consoles due to its ever-expandable and upgradable hardware, graphical potential, affordability, game library, mod support, freedom of input and peripheral options, emulation capability and other popular reasons. This change in meaning and widespread popularity can be linked back to the creation and popularization of the /r/PCMasterRace subreddit created by Reddit user pedro19 in 2011, which accumulated one million members by July 2017. (Over 10 million as of 2024).

While The Escapist continued to popularize the term's (or at least the term "Glorious PC Gaming Master Race") usage in later episodes for several years, writers in more mainstream computer-related and gaming-related publications tended to avoid using the term because of its negative associations, such as Nazism. In early 2015, Tyler Wilde, executive editor of PC Gamer, suggested the term should be abandoned altogether in an article titled "Let's stop calling ourselves the PC Master Race". "It worked as a hyperbolic joke when it was first said as a hyperbolic joke, and I did think it was a little funny to embrace the criticism ironically - for a moment, [but] when I see kids unironically boasting about their 'master-race' affiliation on forums, I cringe". Wilde instead suggested replacing the term, and offered examples such as "Fearsome Keyboard People" and "PC Thunder Cats". The article was met by some disagreement from others who believed the term's usage was acceptable. While Ben Croshaw acknowledged the term's reference to and origins from Nazi Germany, he countered that those who use the term without knowing of the association can be viewed positively as a sign that those ideals and their historic Nazi associations had faded from the public mind. He also made a reference to attempts to incite the term's abandonment as being part of a sort of "thought police", criticizing Wilde's article. Croshaw later sardonically admitted his distaste for the term, jokingly suggesting the term "PC-Gaming-Dick-Slurp-All-Stars" instead.

=== Popularization ===
The rapid growth of the shortened and now re-appropriated "PC Master Race" term as well as its handful of associated communities has attracted the attention of related computer hardware and game companies such as Corsair and Valve, as well as celebrities such as Terry Crews. Since 2015, several large technology companies have partnered with the PC Master Race group to organize contests, events and giveaways, such as AMD, Corsair, Cooler Master, Oculus VR, NZXT, and Nvidia. They have also been in close collaboration with the Folding@Home project, a distributed computing project developed by Stanford University, regularly pushing members of the community to donate their computer power to science, and organizing promotion events to fight against cancer and other diseases, as well as hosting an AMA for the Folding@Home team themselves, which had the participation of investigators and students from Memorial Sloan Kettering Cancer Center, Stanford University and Temple University.

By several accounts, the term has become an Internet meme, and is a launching point for debates about the relative popularity of gaming platforms. Reviewer Paul Tassi in Forbes suggested in 2014 that PCs had an edge because they were a "necessity" for everyday life while consoles were a "luxury" costing hundreds of dollars and only offering a few different games or features over that of what a PC already offered. However, the increasing cost of many new PC gaming components from the early 2020s, partially attributed to the 2020–2023 global chip shortage, has resulted in a re-evaluation of the affordability of PCs over consoles gaming.

== Bibliography ==
- Susie Dent (2016). John Murray (ed.). Dent's Modern Tribes: The Secret Languages of Britain. John Murray Press. ISBN 9781473623880.
