= Cannabis and video game culture =

Cannabis and video game culture is the intersection of cannabis culture and video game culture.

== Leisure culture ==
Various lifestyle publications covering cannabis and video games, vice versa, or both. The fusion can result in altered game play styles and objectives, exemplified by "Chicken Dreams," a cinematic performance artwork inside Grand Theft Auto V discovered by Imran Hafiz.

Various eSports leagues and video gaming venues acknowledge cannabis use among video game players in various ways.

== Cannabis for altering play ==
There are various narratives describing how cannabis improves, diminishes, or alters the video game playing experience.

== Problem behavior ==
Various research surveys report that video game addiction and cannabis abuse behaviors mutually increase each other. Problems with the pairing of video game addition and cannabis abuse can be especially prominent in adolescents.

== Video games featuring cannabis ==
Showcasing cannabis is highly taboo in media narratives. Because of this, mainstream censors will approve video games where the objective is murder, but prohibit video games which present cannabis use as normal. One video game about cannabis is an industrial production and marketing similator.
