= Gamurs =

Esports media business

GAMURS Group
- Website type: News, media, and technology services
- Available in: English, Portuguese, French, and Spanish
- Founders: Riad Chikhani, Phillip Luu, Carl Oehme, Halim Yoo, and Malik Akl
- Key people: Riad Chikhani (Co-Founder & CEO), Geraint Davies (COO)
- Website: gamurs.group
- Users: 55,000,000
- Launched: 14 February 2016; 10 years ago

The GAMURS Group, simply known as Gamurs, is an esports media and entertainment publisher. Established in 2014, the group operates multiple brands focusing on the esports and entertainment news markets, including the websites Dot Esports, We Got This Covered, The Mary Sue, Prima Games, and Escapist. GAMURS is based in Sydney, Australia, with an office in Austin, Texas.

== History ==
In 2010, Riad Chikhani, Phillip Luu, and Malik Akl established Rune Gear, a forum for the game RuneScape. They sold the business at the age of 17 to focus on school. Their experience inspired them to develop a similar business, but for a wider variety of games. In December 2014, they joined with Carl Oehme and Halim Yoo to form GAMURS Group. GAMURS began as a social network for gamers after joining the NRMA Jumpstart program run by the Slingshot Accelerator. Shortly after the program ended, the company raised $500,000 in a seed round.

GAMURS acquired two platforms, TeamFind and CSGOTeamFinder. On February 14, 2016, these sites merged to provide team and player-finding functionality for Counter-Strike: Global Offensive and League of Legends. GAMURS raised an additional $500,000 in another seed round in April 2016.

On April 26, 2016, GAMURS acquired esports publication websites eSports-Nation.com, GoldPer10, and eSports.guru. Once the acquisitions were completed, the three platforms were merged, making GAMURS a content provider for titles such as Call of Duty: Black Ops III, Halo 5: Guardians, Hearthstone, and Overwatch. On June 11, GAMURS launched EsportsWikis, an online encyclopedia dedicated to esports. On September 19, it acquired esports news outlet SplitPush.net. On October 28, GAMURS acquired Dot Esports from The Daily Dot.

On November 9, 2020, GAMURS acquired Pro Game Guides, a source for gaming guides. On June 28, 2021, GAMURS acquired We Got This Covered, a news site for film, TV, comics, and entertainment culture. On November 17, GAMURS acquired the website The Mary Sue, a website intended to highlight women in the "geek culture space" and provide a safe space for minority and underrepresented voices.

On January 3, 2022, GAMURS announced the acquisition of Prima Games, a gaming media company. On February 10, it announced the acquisition of Twinfinite, a website focused on video game news, reviews, features, and opinions. On September 30, it confirmed the acquisition of several websites from Enthusiast Gaming, including Destructoid, The Escapist, PC Invasion, and Siliconera. Their firing of The Escapist's editor-in-chief in November resulted in a number of contributors at the website—notably Ben "Yahtzee" Croshaw of Zero Punctuation—resigning and forming a new employee-owned outlet.

In July 2024, an unknown number of employees were laid off across Destructoid, PC Invasion, and Dot Esports.

On 24 September 2024, a second round of lay offs was made, losing about 30 employees due to "unprecedented shifts" in the industry, specifically relating to Google's Helpful Content update in 2023 and "the decline in Google search and Discover traffic across all sites". Those affected include Dot Esports gaming editor Vic Hood, Dot Esports Australian managing editor Isaac McIntyre, Twinfinite managing editor Tom Hopkins, Destructoid staff writer Jamie Sharp, and PC Invasion senior staff writer Diego Perez.

Additional layoffs took place in February, March, and April 2025. PC enthusiast website PC Invasion was also seemingly shutdown and now redirects to Prima Games.
