= Ralph Gean =

American rockabilly and outsider music singer-songwriter

- Born: October 12, 1942 (age 83); Port Arthur, Texas, US
- Genres: Oldies; Rock n' Roll; Rockabilly; Outsider; Country
- Occupation: Musician
- Instruments: Guitar; Vocals
- Years active: 1961–present
- Labels: Lori Records, Gallant Records, Discriminate Audio, Public Eyesore Records, Hypnotic Turtle Records
- Publisher: Fonky Donk Music
- Website: ralphgean.com

Ralph Gean (born 1942) is an American singer-songwriter known for his eclectic and often bizarre blend of rockabilly, country, classic rock n’ roll, and outsider pop.

== Biography ==
Ralph F. Gean was born in 1942, in Port Arthur, Texas. He attended Thomas Jefferson Sr. High (where Janis Joplin happened to be a classmate). Gean dropped out of school at seventeen to join the U.S. Air Force, but then failed to actually enlist. During the summer of 1959 the teenaged Gean worked at a carnival and saved up enough money to buy his first guitar, and then began performing locally in Texas in the early 1960s, doing both originals and covers of contemporary rock n' roll standards.

=== Initial success: early-to-mid-1960s ===
In 1962 Gean made his first studio recordings for Ray Doggett Productions, recording with B.J. Thomas (and Thomas’ band at the time, The Triumphs), Freddie Koenig and The Jades, and the vocal groups The Epics and The Lively Sisters. Gean's early recordings were released on Lori Records and Gallant Records. Gean became regionally popular in the Houston, Texas, area, and regularly opened concerts for national acts like Roy Orbison, Glenn Campbell, and Roy Head. Gean's songs also began to be covered by his contemporaries such as Sunny & the Sunliners and Vance Charles & The Sonics.

=== Post-success years: mid-1960s to late-1970s ===
Following “Beatle Mania" and "the British Invasion" of the early-to-mid-1960s, Gean's popularity quickly waned, and he was unable to locate a record label interested in releasing his self-financed third single. Gean then acquired his high school equivalency certificate, got married, and moved to Idaho to seek employment through the Church of Jesus Christ of Latter-day Saints (LDS Church), of which he was a member. Gean attended Rick's College in Rexburg, where he acted in theatrical productions and worked a series of odd jobs, before dropping out of college after his first year. Gean had four children with his spouse during this period.

At the end of the 1960s, Gean and his wife moved back to Texas, where Gean again worked a series of odd jobs to support his family. In the early 1970s, Gean moved his family again, to Salt Lake City, Utah, and broke from the orthodox LDS Church to become involved with a Mormon splinter sect led by Rulon Alred, whom the press later dubbed "The Mormon Manson." Gean and his wife then entered into a polygamous marriage with a second wife; which, two years later, resulted in the divorce of his initial non-polygamous marriage, and resulted in the breakup of Gean's family. Gean was later excommunicated from The Church of Jesus Christ of Latter Day Saints. Near the end of the 1970s, Gean's second wife also left him.

In the late 1970s Gean experienced depression, for which he sought treatment, and relocated back to Texas, where he experienced homelessness. In 1980 Gean returned to Salt Lake City, still experiencing homelessness, and spent a-year-and-a-half living out of a low-rent hotel and supporting himself by busking on the streets of Salt Lake City. During this time Gean also was caught-up in a currency counterfeiting ring led by a friend; which ended when U.S. Secret Service agents appeared at Gean's door and asked him to take a visit downtown with them.

By 1983 Gean was no longer experiencing homelessness, having secured stable employment and a fixed living situation, and began performing and recording music again. Into the mid-1980s Gean fronted a number of rock, rockabilly, and country acts in the Salt Lake City area, and performed regularly at bars, small venues, and fairs throughout Utah and Wyoming.

=== "Rediscovery" by the hipsters: late-1980s to late-1990s ===
In 1987 Gean moved from Utah to Denver, Colorado, where he found work as a caretaker for a disabled trust beneficiary. Gean was then "discovered" in the mid-1990s by Denver's aficionados of "incredibly strange" outsider and novelty music, such as Boyd Rice, Eric Allen, Jello Biafra, and others. This began a comeback for Gean's theretofore washed-up career, and he started performing regularly in and around Denver, both as a solo act and with rockabilly backing bands. In 1996 Gean was featured on the cover of the city's free weekly paper, Westword.

In 1997, the first ever compact disc collection of Gean's music, A Star Unborn: The Amazing Story of Ralph Gean, was released by the British record label World Serpent. The CD kindled a wider interest in Gean's music, and in the second half of the 1990s, he would go on to perform with the likes of Paul Burlison and Rocky Burnette, and with bands such as The Mutilators, The Volts, and The Humpers; as well as open for bands such as The Reverend Horton Heat, and John Sinclair. In the late 1990s Gean was brought into the studio to record with both Jello Biafra and Eric Allen, and was flown out to San Francisco to play to more than 1,500 people at an Incredibly Strange Wrestling event.

=== Post-rediscovery: 2000s to 2020s ===
In 2006 one of Gean's performances at the Denver D.I.Y. punk venue Monkey Mania was recorded and issued as a bootleg live album on CD. In 2007 a 2-disc CD compilation of Gean's music was released, The Amazing Ralph Gean – His Music, His Story, featuring remastered versions of many of the songs on the by then long-out-of-print 1997 CD, and a full disc of Gean's recordings at Sun Studio. In 2011 Gean contributed a song to a deadbubbles tribute compilation CD, and in 2013 contributed another song to a Little Fyodor tribute compilation CD. In 2014 Gean recorded three songs with a live backing band, which were released as a lathe-cut limited vinyl single. In 2019 Gean recorded a two-song digital single. In 2020, a tribute album featuring various artists covering Gean's songs was released, titled Hard To Be A Killer: A Tribute To Ralph Gean. In 2023, Gean provided spoken word on a song by the band Unborn Ghost. Also in 2023, the Portuguese band From Atomic covered Gean's song "Electricity" on the compilation Coverbilly Psychosis. In 2026, Gean released an album of various cover songs recorded from the early 1970s to the mid-2010s, titled Ralph Gean Covers The Hits.

As of spring 2026, Gean lives in a retirement community in Broomfield, Colorado. He continues to sporadically perform live as a solo artist in and around the Denver metro area.

== Discography ==
=== Singles ===
- Weeping Willow Tree / Experimental Love, Lori Records, 1962 (vinyl 45 single).
- One Night in San Antonio / Hey Dr. Casey, Gallant Records, 1964 (vinyl 45 single).
- Baast Session, Baast Records, 2014 (lathe-cut vinyl 10" single).
- Multicolored Jam / Sea of Heartbreak, Discriminate Audio, 2019 (digital single).

=== Albums ===
- Live at Monkey Mania, Monkey Mania Records, 2006 (CDR).
- Ralph Gean Covers The Hits, Discriminate Audio, 2026 (digital album)

=== Compilations ===
- A Star Unborn, Or What Would Have Been If What Is Hadn't Happened: The Amazing Story of Ralph Gean, World Serpent, 1996 (CD).
- The Amazing Ralph Gean – His Music, His Story, Discriminate Audio, 2007 (2xCD).
  - Disc One: "A Star Unborn"
  - Disc Two: "The Sun Studio Sessions"

=== Appearances ===
- Reclamation Now! – A Tribute to deadbubbles, Hypnotic Turtle Records, 2011 (CD).
- The Unscratchable Itch: A Tribute to Little Fyodor, Public Eyesore, 2013 (CD).
- Unborn Ghost, Airs of Contempt and Derision, Discriminate Audio, 2023 (CD, LP, Cassette).

=== Tribute albums ===
- Hard to Be a Killer: A Tribute to Ralph Gean, Hypnotic Turtle Records, 2020 (CD).

== Music videos ==
- "Goddess of Love," directed by Matt Whoolery
- "Planet Of The Rain," directed by Matt Whoolery

== Archived radio performances ==
- Ralph Gean on KVCU's Hypnotic Turtle Radio Circus (audio) (2014).
- Ralph Gean on WCSB (audio) (2012).
- Ralph Gean on KVCU (audio) (2008)
- Ralph Gean on Collective Voice Radio (audio) (2007)
- Ralph Gean on KGNU (audio) (2007)

== Press and reviews ==
Ralph Gean has been profiled and reviewed in Denver publications such as Westword, and The Denver Post; national U.S. publications such as Maximum Rocknroll, Rock & Blues News, Blue Suede News, and Exotica Et Cetera; European publications such as Nude Magazine (United Kingdom) and Vice España (Spain); and small independent publications such as: No Part of It, Yawner, and Victoria. An extensive biographical essay on Gean appears in the 2025 Brian M. Clark book Drunk Jerk: A Chrestomathy of Carousal and Critique, under the title "The Amazing Ralph Gean – The Tumultuous Tale of a Tenacious Troubadour."
