= Monkey Mania (venue) =

Colorado underground music venue

- Interactive map of Monkey Mania
- Address: 2126 Arapahoe Street; Denver; United States
- Coordinates: 39.7528°N 104.9890°W
- Operator: Josh Taylor, Amy Fantastic
- Type: All-ages D.I.Y. independent music venue.

Construction
- Opened: 1998
- Closed: 2006
- Demolished: 2019
- Years active: 1998-2006

Website
- monkeymania.net

Monkey Mania was a warehouse space turned D.I.Y. music venue in Denver, Colorado, which was active from late 1998 to 2006. The venue was known as a hub for shows by underground touring bands and local punk / experimental acts. It regularly hosted national touring independent American acts like Sonic Youth, HEALTH, Future Islands, The Microphones, Lightning Bolt, Coachwhips, Murder by Death, Glass Candy, Chromelodeon, Caroliner Rainbow, and Nels Cline; international acts like Noxagt, and Jean-Louis Costes; and local Denver acts like Mr. Pacman, Ralph Gean, Planes Mistaken for Stars, Little Fyodor, Pictureplane, Friends Forever, Rainbow Sugar, Ultra Boyz, Sparkles, Zombie Zombie, and Solar Bear.

== History ==
Monkey Mania was primarily run by Josh Taylor of the band Friends Forever. Taylor and his partner Amy Fantastic began Monkey Mania in 1998 as a Denver music venue at the address 50 North Lipan Street, but it was later relocated to downtown Denver, at the address 2126 Arapahoe Street. At both locations, the venue was run by a handful of live-in residents who were active in the Denver independent music scene and often performed at the venue as opening bands for larger touring acts. Every Monkey Mania show was all-ages, there was no alcohol served, and smoking was not allowed in the warehouse.

In 2024, the band The Intima described a performance at Monkey Mania as their "craziest show," stating,

"Monkey Mania in Denver, Colorado ... the shows there were always wild. It was a warehouse where there were basically no rules – we played with a band called Armature that, halfway through the set, pulled out a sledgehammer and started smashing absolutely everything in reach. They smashed big holes into the wooden floor."

Residents / participants at the two Monkey Mania locations included: Josh Taylor (ex-Friends Forever / Foot Village), Amy Fantastic (ex-Rainbow Sugar / Ground Unicorn Horn), Nate Hayden (ex-Friends Forever), Ben Brunton (ex-Secret Girls), Germaine Baca (ex-Rainbow Sugar / Sin Desires Marie / Old Time Relijun), Claudine Rosseau (ex-Sin Desires Marie), Brian M. Clark (Unborn Ghost), Luke Fairchild (ex-Git Some / Sparkles / Kingdom of Magic / Quits), Mike McNutts, Toshimi Ishiki, Jason Issacs, and Natalie Baca.

In the early 2000s, performances at Monkey Mania by the band Wrangler Brutes and by the singer/songwriter Ralph Gean were recorded and later released as bootleg live albums.

The final show at Monkey Mania hosted by Taylor and Fantastic was held on December 3, 2005. Taylor and Fantastic thereafter moved to Los Angeles, California, where they hosted shows at The Smell. The former Monkey Mania venue at 2126 Arapahoe Street was then handed-off to a new group of young independent musicians who renamed it Kingdom of Doom. Within a year, Kingdom of Doom had ceased to function as a venue, and the warehouse-turned-showspace was condemned sometime thereafter. The building that housed Monkey Mania was demolished in 2019 and the once-rundown downtown Denver neighborhood in which it was located has since become "gentrified," to the frustration of some Denver residents. The independent D.I.Y. all-ages successor to Monkey Mania in Denver was generally seen to be another later-opened venue called Rhinoceropolis.

Former Monkey Mania resident Brian M. Clark maintained a blog while living at the showspace from Fall 2003 to Summer 2004, in which he wrote about various shows and happenings that occurred at the venue while he resided there. The blog was later published along with accompanying photographs in Clark's 2025 book Drunk Jerk: A Chrestomathy of Carousal and Critique.
