= Raskulls =

2010 video game

- Developer: Halfbrick Studios
- Publisher: Microsoft Game Studios
- Designer: Daniel Vogt
- Artist: Matthew Knights
- Platform: Xbox 360
- Release: December 29, 2010
- Genres: Platform game, action
- Modes: Single-player, multiplayer

Raskulls is an action platformer video game developed by Halfbrick Studios and published by Microsoft Game Studios for the Xbox 360 via Xbox Live Arcade. It was released on December 29, 2010. In Raskulls, players must navigate through platform-based levels filled with blocks of varying shape and size. The characters must use their brick-breaking wands to create the fastest route to the end of the level.

Raskulls received generally favorable reviews from critics. Reviewers praised the comic character design, humorous dialogue and emotions, and overall gameplay. Many reviewers praised the number of game modes and the multiplayer component as well, but some reviewers felt the game would not keep its novelty as it aged. Initial sales were high, with over 19,000 units sold during the month of its release. Year-end 2011 sales were in excess of 101,000 units.

== Gameplay ==
Raskulls is a racing platform game which features competitive gameplay for up to four players.

Raskulls is an action platform game where players must move through platform-based levels filled with blocks of different shapes and sizes. The objective is to complete the level in the shortest time possible. The Raskulls possess block-breaking wands, and the key to gaining an advantage is by using the character's wand against the blocks to create the most efficient path through the level. When blocks are destroyed, remaining blocks fall and like-colored blocks combine in large blocks. When four or more gray block come into contact with each other, all touching gray blocks explode.

The single player campaign, known as Mega Quest, takes places over three game worlds. Players navigate from stage to stage using an overworld layout, similar to Super Mario World. Once a level is selected, the game switches to a side-scrolling, platforming game. The game consists of ten game types which include Ammo Scrooge and Bomb Disposal. Both offensive and defensive items can be acquired during gameplay to traverse through levels and defeat opponents. One such item, known as Boosties, can be collected within each level which fill the character's Frenzy bar. When Frenzy is activated, the Raskull is powered with super speed while the Frenzy energy depletes. Multiplayer is either online via Xbox Live or up to four players locally via splitscreen. In addition to attempting to get the best time in a match, players can also use wands and powerups to throw other players off course or into environment hazards. Players can also level up their characters after multiplayer matches.

== Synopsis ==
The game is set in the fictional world of the title characters, the Raskulls. An evil race of intergalactic buccaneers known as the Pirats have crashed-landed on the Raskulls' world in their search for the cheese planet. As the Pirats seek a source of fuel for their ship, their leader, Captain J. Turncoat, learns of the Shiny Stone, an object with incredible power. The Pirats fail in an attempt to steal the stone, and the Raskull King devises a plan to catch their enemies. A tournament is created in which the winner will receive the Shiny Stone as a surprise. The original plan goes awry: a Raskull named Dragon sends a royal decree to Knight, who winds up getting beaten up by the Pirat henchmen. As per the contingency plan, Dragon emerges the victor of the tournament, but as he claims his prize the second place competitor, revealing himself as Captain Turncoat, punches Dragon in the face and makes off with the Shiny Stone.

The Raskull king sends the Raskull known as Ninja to recover a previously unknown second Shiny Stone from an ancient tomb, under the condition that the latter does not take anything else. Along the way, Ninja encounters Wizard, who opens the door to the temple for him in exchange for a beverage called Jungle Juice; a mummy Raskull who assists in navigating the tombs; the Pirat henchmen Scurv and Barney, who are also searching for the second Shiny Stone; and the Temple Guardian, who attempts to incinerate Ninja with a laser that is reflected back by a mirror that Mummy finds. Stealing the second Shiny Stone from under Captain Turncoat's nose, Ninja is successful in his mission, and the king himself then sets out to recover the first Shiny Stone from the Pirats.

During his journey he encounters opposition from some territorial Raskulls. The king is forced to complete each of the challenges given to progress. Also, Scurv and Barney try to drive him to insanity by hiding under a block and an antique vase, respectively. He eventually arrives at the Pirats' downed ship, which landed near an active volcano called Mount Madness, and recovers the first Shiny Stone only to find out that Captain Turncoat has stolen the second from his castle. The two run into each other on their journey back to their homes. During an initially awkward conversation, the king suggests a game of rock paper scissors to see who gets both Shiny Stones, but is forced to battle the Pirat captain as he pilots his choice, which turns out to be "ship with lots of cannons". When the machine is defeated, Turncoat pulls the second Stone from King. This enrages the latter enough to engage in fisticuffs with the former, only to have both Shiny Stones escape their grasp and fall into a pool of lava. The lava erupts, sending the king, the captain and the Pirat's ship flying upward. The captain kicks the king back to the ground and boards his ship as it reaches orbit. As the ship continues to gain momentum the crew discovers that the molten lava is actually cheese, indicating the Raskulls' planet was the cheese planet they were searching for. King falls back to the ground in front of his subjects, who sat watching the battle, but just after King comments on the battle being a "'cheesy ending'", Dragon reappears and throws a brick into King's face, knocking him out.

== Development and marketing ==
Developers designed various expressions to depict emotions on the Raskulls.

Raskulls was announced for the Xbox 360 via Xbox Live Arcade at the Game Developers Conference in San Francisco, California held in Match 2009. Two promo images accompanied the press release and featured King and Dragon, two of the main characters. Following the initial reveal, character profiles were distributed among the gaming media to demonstrate the game's art style and humor. A teaser trailer was also released which took a satirical view on traditional game trailers featuring "epic" music and bold statements, whereas the Raskulls teaser showed an abrupt change in tone as King is shown flexing his muscles in front of a mirror accompanied by elevator music. Halfbrick released the first official trailer for Raskulls in June of the same year. The trailer showed various levels, characters and gameplay modes, including snippets of multiplayer. The game was originally slated for a Q3 2009 release, but it was later pushed back. In mid-2009 Halfbrick held a contest in which community members could design their own Raskull based on a template given by Halfbrick. The winning entry was a police-themed Raskull which was added to the game.

In 2010, Halfbrick posted a poll in February in order to choose the official cover for the game. The winning box art was revealed in March. On May 21, a Raskulls tournament took place at the Mana Bar in Brisbane, Australia. It was next shown at Penny Arcade Expo East in Boston, Massachusetts in April, where it was again made playable to conference attendees. A second tournament at the Mana Bar was held on December 23, where winners received a free copy of the game upon its release. The game was also featured in Microsoft's Games for the Holidays promotion. As part of the promotion, additional content was made available if players also purchased A World of Keflings or ilomilo. Players could also use the mascot from Destructoid, a video game blog, which can be unlocked during the game's Mega Quest campaign. Raskulls was released for the Xbox 360 on December 29. In January 2011, Halfbrick released a downloadable content pack entitled Raskulls Reinforcements 1. It contained four new playable characters: three Raskulls, Viking, Spaceman and Kitten, and one Pirat, Barney.

== Reception ==
Reception

Aggregate score
Aggregator	Score
Metacritic	75/100

Review scores
Publication	Score
The A.V. Club	B
Edge	6/10
Eurogamer	9/10
Game Informer	6.5/10
GamePro	4/5
GameRevolution	C+
GameSpot	6/10
GameTrailers	8/10
GameZone	6.5/10
Joystiq	3.5/5
Official Xbox Magazine (US)	8/10
The Escapist	4/5

=== Pre-release ===
In a preview of the game, CinemaBlend described Raskulls as a blend between Mario Kart, Castle Crashers, and Bomberman. It also drew comparisons to Mr. Driller. It was praised by various members of the video game media. David Hinkle of Joystiq felt that the blending of genres in Raskulls could be a "dangerously fun combination". Destructoid's James Stephanie Sterling also praised the game in previews, stating that it may be one of the "hottest XBLA titles" of 2009.

=== Post-release ===
Raskulls received "generally favorable reviews" according to the review aggregation website Metacritic. It received an Editor's Choice award from Peter Eykemans of TeamXbox who praised the re-playability factor of the game.

Tom McShea of GameSpot praised the game's humor. He stated that "the comedic timing is done exceptionally well" and said that Raskulls is overflowed with quirky touches.

Mixed views were given in regards to gameplay. Many reviewers felt that the overall gameplay mechanics were solid, but some reviewers felt that it was repetitive. Joystiq reviewer Garrett Martin felt the game had solid mechanics and well designed levels. Dakota Grabowski of GameZone praised the game's puzzle mechanics. Grabowski stated that the "best portions of Raskulls are when the game slows down and asks players to solve puzzles", but felt that the game may not be able to hold a player's interest in the long-term.

Initial sales were high, with over 19,000 units sold during the month of its release. Year-end 2011 sales were in excess of 101,000 units.
