= Drum Buddy =

Drum machine

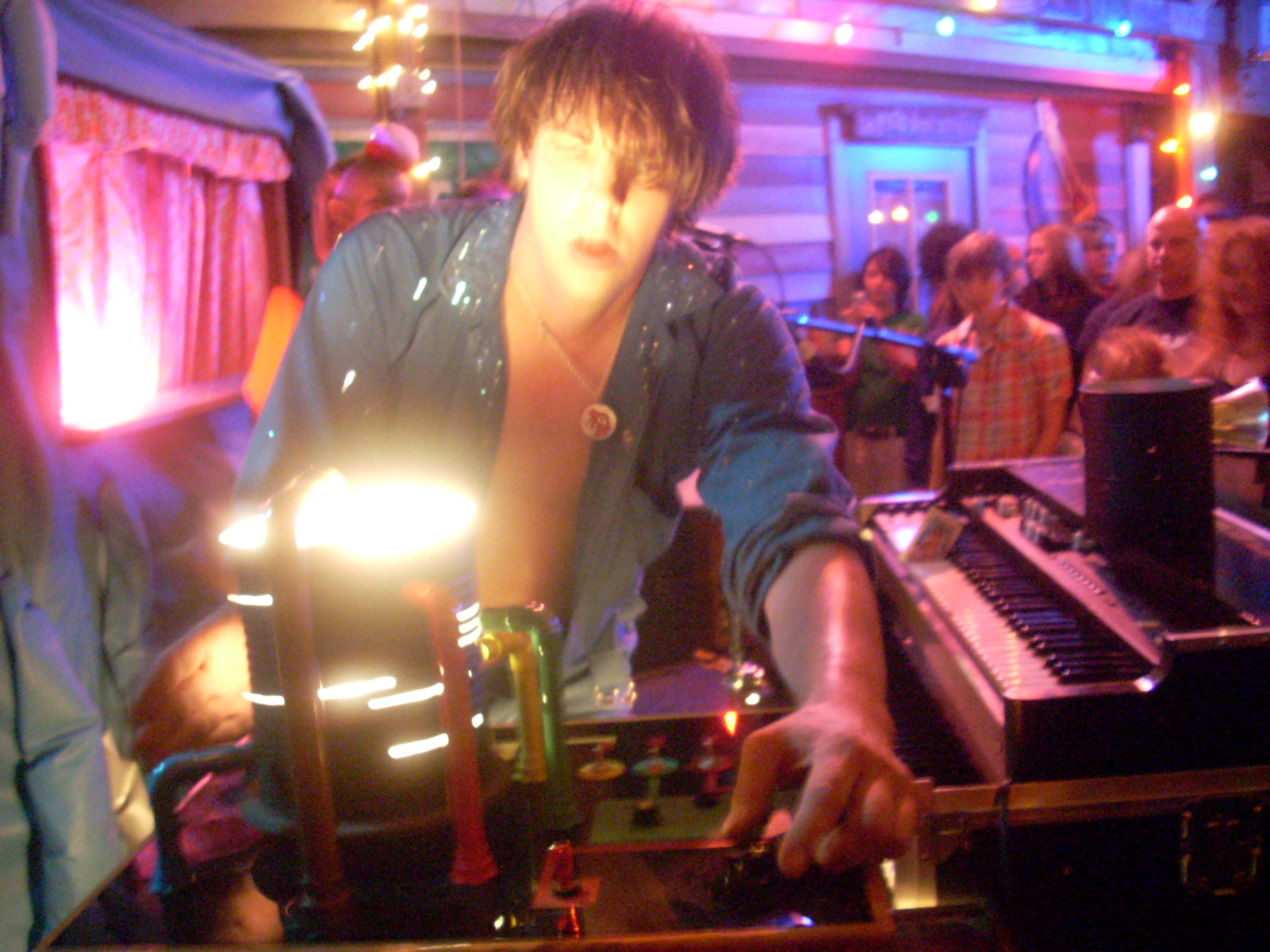
Quintron playing Drum Buddy

The Drum Buddy, invented by New Orleans Ninth Ward one-man band Quintron, is a light-activated oscillating drum machine which operates on the principles of an optical sound theremin. An electronic instrument developed in the Spellcaster Lodge QElectronics laboratory, only 44 units hand-assembled by Quintron exist. Its four voices – Space, Snare, Bass and Kick, are triggered by activating a photoelectric cell either intermittently or with an on/off DIP switch in combination with exposure to light.

The Drum Buddy is outfitted with a light fixture on a periscopic pipe fixed to its base. The fixture's bulb can be controlled by means of a dimmer switch. The bulb hangs above a rotating platen upon which a number 10 can (the large size common to coffee, canned vegetables and some sauces) prepared with holes and non-reflective paint is placed. As the can rotates, its holes pass the Drum Buddy's photoelectric cells, firing drum-like tones and theremin or Moog synthesizer-like chirps or buzzes.

Accomplished purveyors of the Drum Buddy can operate the instrument freestyle by "scratching" the can back and forth against the resistance of the platen's motor or by performing short solos on the bass channel's 12-point chromatic scale.
