= IPOD generation =

The IPOD generation stands for Insecure, Pressured, Over-taxed, and Debt-ridden. The term was first used in the Reform report 'The Class of 2005 - the IPOD generation', written by Professor Nick Bosanquet and Blair Gibbs.

Due to diminishing returns for higher education, high levels of taxation, and a demographic shift in welfare arrangements which will place ever greater burdens on the young, people under 35 are facing serious long-term issues which many governments are ignoring. Affordability of housing, especially in countries like Ireland and the UK has dropped in the past few years, pricing many young people out of the market. All of this has meant people under 35 now face future tax burdens and standards of living which may be inferior to their potential, based on past projections.
