= Mana Bar =

Australian video game themed bar

The Mana Bar
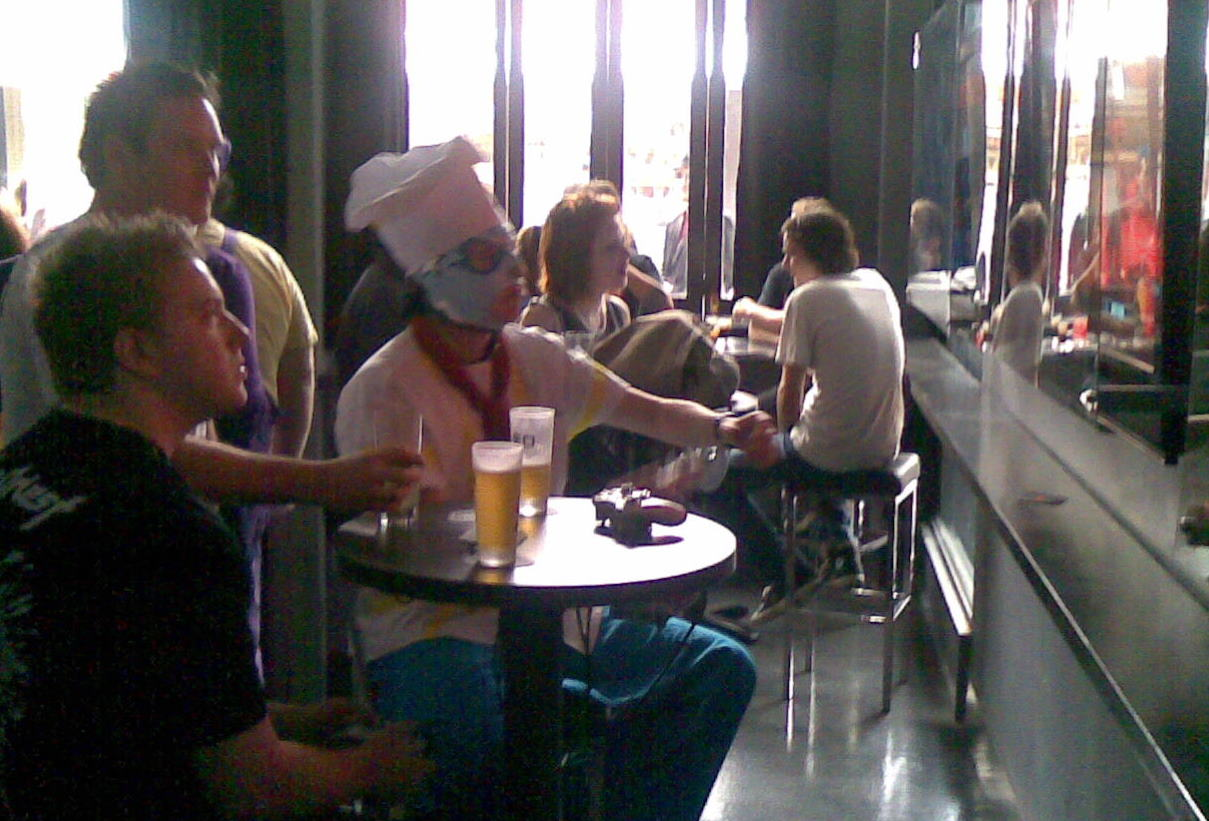
- Patrons playing videogames
- Interactive map of The Mana Bar
- Address: 420 Brunswick St, Fortitude Valley
- Location: Brisbane, Australia
- Coordinates: 27°27′35.24″S 153°2′12.57″E
- Owner: Morrigan Moore
- Capacity: 50
- Type: Bar

Construction
- Opened: 20 March 2010
- Closed: 24 May 2015

Website
- www.manabar.com.au

The Mana Bar was the first Australian cocktail bar and video gaming lounge located in Brisbane, Australia within its biggest night-life and entertainment district, Fortitude Valley. The bar held its opening event on 20 March 2010. The bar allowed visitors to play current generation gaming consoles free of charge while enjoying video game themed drinks.

The Mana Bar was founded as a collaboration between Guy "Yug" Blomberg, co-creator of Australian Gamer; Pras Moorthy, senior designer at The Creative Assembly; video game critic Ben "Yahtzee" Croshaw; and Shay Leighton, creative director of local cocktail bar The Bowery. Morrigan Moore became the owner and general manager in May 2014.

The bar closed on 24 May 2015.

== History ==
The idea was first conceived by Australian Gamer co-creator Guy Blomberg, in December 2007 after a house party in which Guy himself noted the successful combination of alcohol and video games made for an excellent social environment. Guy was later joined in this enterprise by Ben "Yahtzee" Croshaw, Prasant Moorthy and Shay Leighton. After years of planning and several pushed back opening dates, the Mana Bar opened on 20 March 2010. It is also reported that there are only a handful of venues in the world that offer a similar experience. Despite the 50 person capacity of the venue, the opening night saw over 100 line up, with the waiting time for some reported to be up to three hours long.

The Mana Bar has received significant media coverage from prime video game and geek culture sites including Kotaku, Destructoid, Gizmodo and Joystiq.

On 9 August of the same year, it was confirmed that the success of the Mana Bar in Brisbane has led to plans to expand to Sydney (no opening dates were mentioned) and Melbourne due to be opened on 16 July 2011. It was also revealed that there were plans to expand internationally, with the owners looking at opening the bar in the United States and Europe.

After a little over two years of operation, the Melbourne bar closed in September 2013, citing low patronage further impacted by restricted trading hours.

On 19 May 2015, the owners announced via the bar's Facebook page that the venue would cease trading on Sunday 24 May. The owners thanked "everyone [who] made it the sweet ride it was."

== Video game industry relations ==
The Mana Bar had strong ties with the video game industry, and had been used by developers and publishers as a promotional venue where they were able to preview or launch their games. This included the launch of BlazBlue, the Halo: Reach multiplayer beta, Just Cause 2 and Raskulls all being playable at the venue prior to the official launch of the games, the latter being a preview exclusive to the Mana Bar.
