= Yahtzee Croshaw =

British video game journalist and author (born 1983)

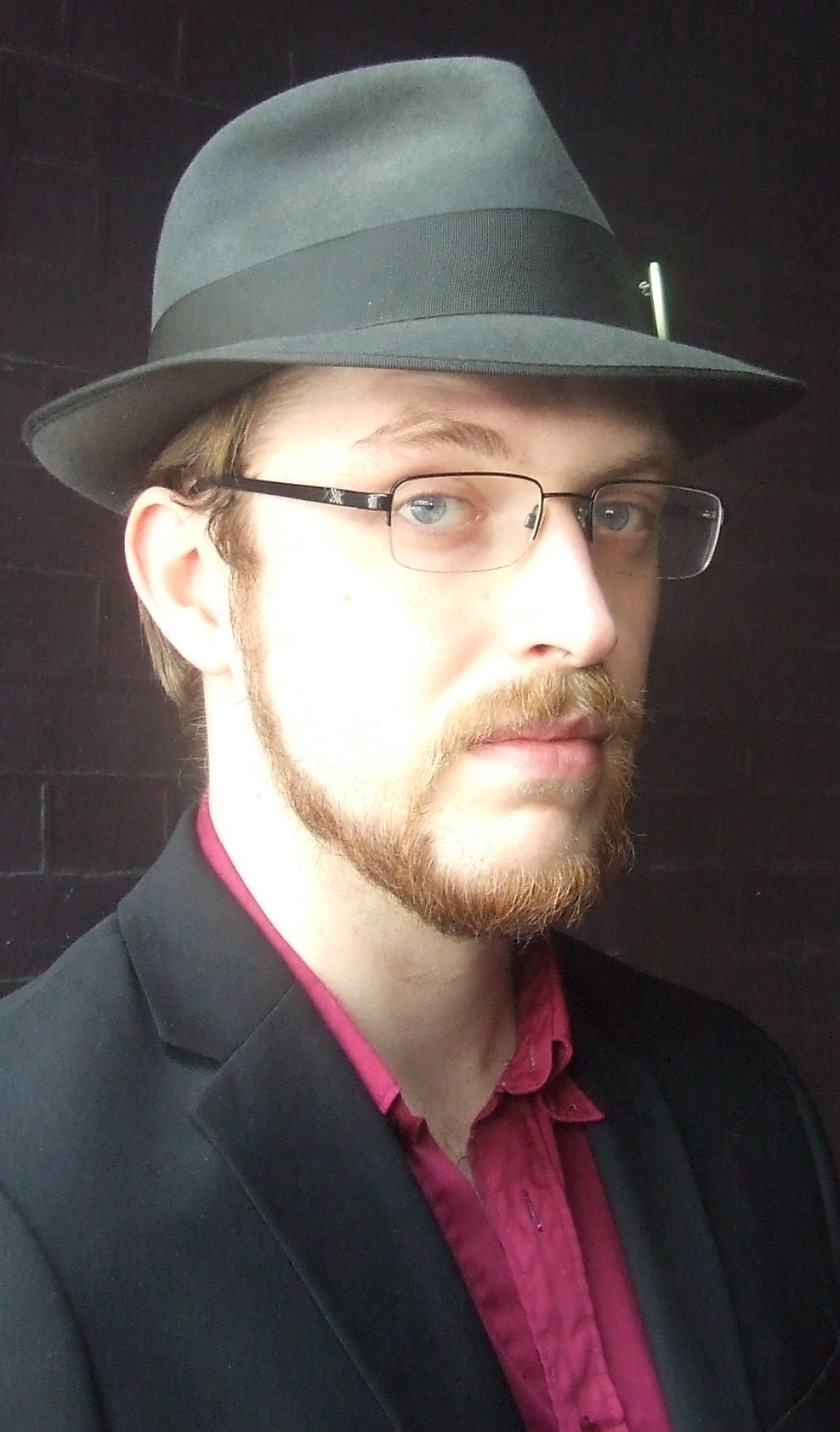
- Croshaw and his Fedora in 2010
- Born: Benjamin Richard Croshaw; 24 May 1983 (age 43); Rugby, England
- Occupations: Journalist; video game critic; author; video game developer; humourist
- Employers: The Escapist (2007–2023); Second Wind (2023–present)
- Known for: Zero Punctuation; Fully Ramblomatic
- Spouse: Kess (m. 2018)
- Children: 2
- Website: fullyramblomatic.com

Benjamin Richard "Yahtzee" Croshaw (born 24 May 1983) is a British journalist, video game critic and developer, author, and humourist. He is best known for his video game review series Zero Punctuation, which he produced for The Escapist from 2007 to 2023, and its spiritual successor Fully Ramblomatic, which he releases through Second Wind.

Croshaw has developed and released over two dozen indie games, including both freeware and commercial titles. He has also published six novels through Dark Horse Books. Outside of creative works, Croshaw was one of four founders of the Mana Bar, an Australian cocktail bar and video gaming lounge which opened in 2010, and had closed by 2015.

== Game journalism ==
=== Zero Punctuation ===
Zero Punctuation is a video-review series Croshaw released every Wednesday on The Escapist between 2007 and 2023. The series began with his review of the demo of The Darkness, which quickly grew in popularity. After one more review covering Fable: The Lost Chapters, Croshaw was hired to continue the series on The Escapist. Reviews were typically posted initially on The Escapist's site, then uploaded to The Escapist's YouTube channel a week later. The addition of the series to The Escapist led to a large growth in site traffic, and the series became the most popular feature on The Escapist, with each episode consistently receiving hundreds of thousands of views, and the most popular episodes surpassing a million views.

Throughout the series's lifetime, Croshaw became known for his rapid-fire delivery (from which the series's title is derived), along with his harsh critique of both the games he reviewed and the broader video game industry, as well as the crude humour and illustrations contained in his reviews. Additionally, Croshaw coined the term "PC Master Race" in one review, which then became common parlance among PC gamers. Reviews are roughly five minutes in length, and contained no numerical rating or score, as Croshaw called them "fucking nonsense when you're criticizing from a subjective artistic standpoint."

=== Fully Ramblomatic ===
Avatar of Yahtzee Croshaw

Yahtzee Croshaw
(@YahtzeeCroshaw)
tweeted:

Today, I formally resigned from The Escapist and Gamurs. I don't have the rights to Zero Punctuation, but whatever happens you'll be hearing my voice again soon, in a new place. Join this discord for updates in the coming days:

6 November 2023

On 6 November 2023, Croshaw announced his resignation from The Escapist alongside other colleagues following the abrupt firing of editor-in-chief Nick Calandra that same day, effectively ending Zero Punctuation as a series. Two days later, Calandra and Croshaw announced the creation of Second Wind, a new outlet on which Croshaw would continue weekly video-reviews under the title Fully Ramblomatic.

== Game development ==
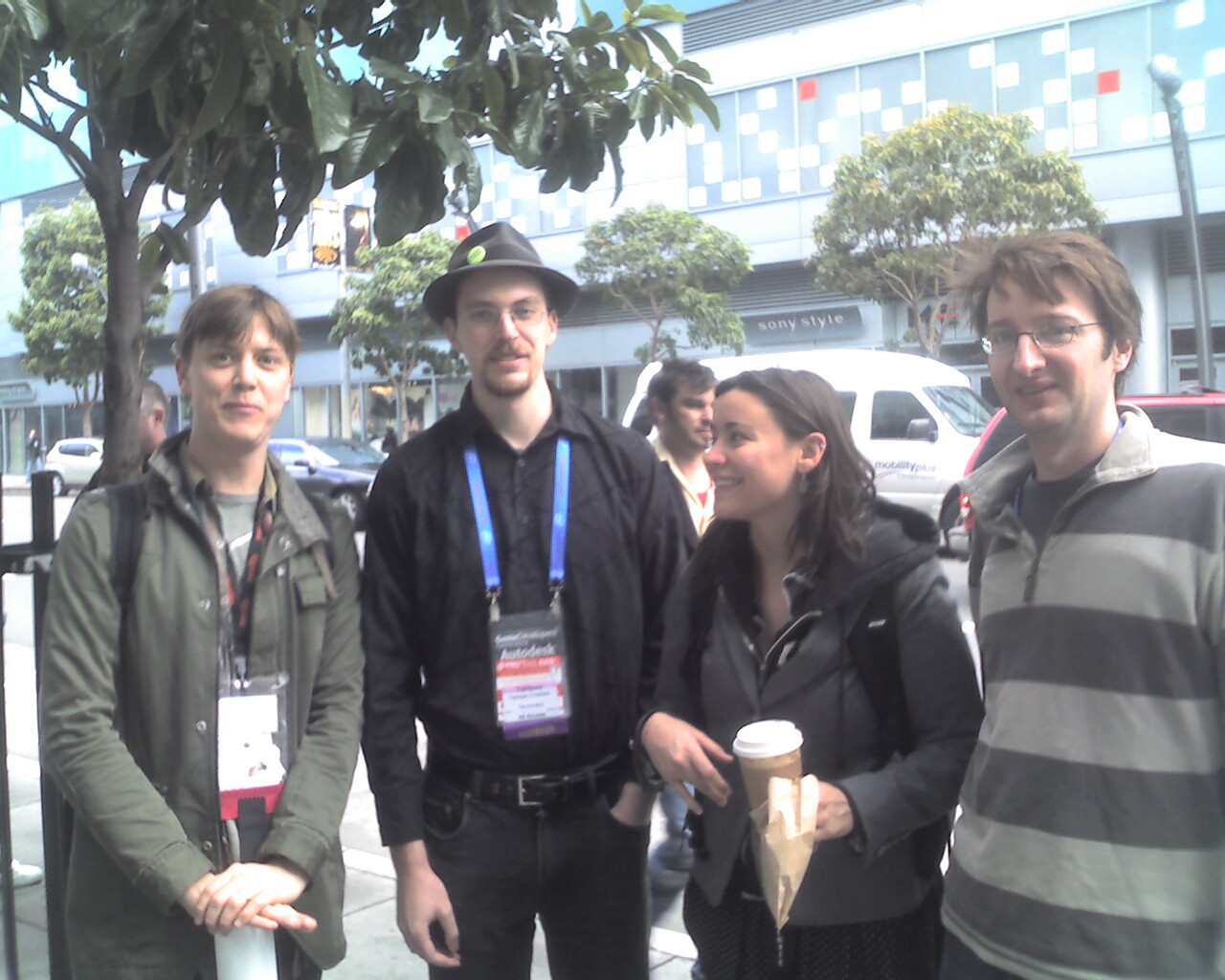
Croshaw (second from left) outside GDC 2008, alongside (left to right) Justin Hall, Merci Hammon, and Duncan Gough

Croshaw's first publicly released game was the Arthur Yahtzee trilogy created in Visual Basic 3 and released in 1998. He also wrote a selection of interactive fiction games through Z-Code, including Offensive Probing, Arthur Yahtzee: The Curse of Hell's Cheesecake, The Sorcerer's Appraisal, and the Countdown trilogy tied to his Chzo Mythos.

Croshaw then developed many freeware games in Adventure Game Studio from 2000 to 2007, including the Rob Blanc trilogy, Lunchtime of the Damned (the inaugural episode of Reality-On-The-Norm), The Trials of Odysseus Kent, the four part Chzo Mythos, Adventures In The Galaxy Of Fantabulous Wonderment, the 1213 series, and Trilby: The Art of Theft.

The latter two games were noted for pushing the engine beyond what it was designed for. He had previously charged to access the special editions for several of these games, but released everything for free in 2009. Builds of the Chzo Mythos and other games were released in 2010 for Linux on icculus.org, later updated in 2015 to the now open source AGS runtime.

In April 2012, Croshaw released the Cave Story inspired Poacher, developed in GameMaker Studio, which he would use to make all his subsequent games.

In a 2014 Vice interview, Croshaw disclosed that he had been asked to pitch a script for the then-in-development Duke Nukem Forever by a producer. He did so, however the script was rejected due to not fitting the producer's vision of Duke Nukem as a character. Croshaw had earlier in 2003 made a horror-themed total conversion mod for the original Duke Nukem 3D called Age of Evil.

In 2015, Croshaw released the mobile game Hatfall in collaboration with Addicting Games and Defy Media. PC Magazine's Will Greenwald scored the game 3.5/5, describing the game as "a funny little take on casual mobile games that doesn't offer any depth or complexity," while adding that the game "does a good job of taking the piss out of games (and you as the player) with the sharp-tongued Britishness of Yahtzee's writing and the minimalism of his animations."

In November 2013, Croshaw released the beta version of the Lovecraftian horror roguelike The Consuming Shadow, On 30 July 2015, the full game was released. Destructoid's Stephen Turner scored the game 4/10, describing the game as "more Frankenstein's Monster than Eldritch Abomination, shambling along [...] with once fresh parts, dug up from here and there." On 20 November, a new version of the game was released on Steam, which included new features.

In May 2019, Croshaw began a new video series called Dev Diary, wherein he would develop 12 freeware games over the course of a year.

His latest game, Starstruck Vagabond, was announced for a 2024 release, and ultimately came out on Steam on 24 May 2024. It received a positive review from Screen Rant, and a mixed review from Hardcore Gamer.

Yahtzee does all the artwork for his games himself in Microsoft Paint, lending his games what Wonder How Two described as "a delightfully old-school Sierra look, like in King's Quest 3." The music in a number of his games was composed by Mark Lovegrove.

== Writing ==
In the 2000s Croshaw created a number of webcomics, namely Chris and Trilby, Cowboy Comics!, The Adventures of Angular Mike, and Yahtzee Takes On The World!, which ran from 20 December 2000, to 22 September 2002. He also uploaded two unpublished novels to his website, Fog Juice and Articulate Jim: A Search for Something.

Croshaw was previously a staff writer for the Adventure Gamers website.

In 2010, Croshaw's first published novel Mogworld, was released by Dark Horse Books. Tor.com's Chris Greenland stated that the book "isn't going to bowl anyone over," while adding that "Croshaw undoubtedly has a strong, unique voice and I would hate to see that limited to only critiques."

External audio

- "Exhaustion From Having Sex With a Minor", read aloud by the author in 2010. Recording licensed under a Creative Commons Attribution–Noncommercial–Share Alike 3.0 license.

Later that same year, the short story collection Machine of Death was published, featuring a story by Croshaw titled "Exhaustion From Having Sex With a Minor". The Times Herald-Record's Jim Higgins described the story as "a talky tale of political intrigue that could be straight out of Isaac Asimov's Foundation series, with a snappy twist at the end that O. Henry might appreciate."

In 2012, an ebook version of Mogworld was released, which included an excerpt of Croshaw's second novel, Jam. The novel was published later that year on 10 October. The Quad's Kelly Baker described the book as "very funny, but [...] also surprisingly disturbing to boot."

In 2017, Croshaw's third novel, the sci-fi comedy Will Save the Galaxy for Food was published. In 2019, its sequel Will Destroy the Galaxy for Cash was published as an audiobook on Audible; a print version followed in 2020. In April 2024, the final book in the series Will Leave the Galaxy for Good was published on Audible, with print and ebook versions to follow.

In 2018, Croshaw's fourth novel Differently Morphous was published as an audiobook, with a print version following on 10 April 2019. A sequel followed in 2021, titled Existentially Challenged.

=== Bibliography ===
- Mogworld. Dark Horse Books. 2010. ISBN 978-1-59582-529-2. OCLC 589017680.
- Jam. Dark Horse Books. 2012. ISBN 978-1-59582-957-3. OCLC 794973812.
- Will Save the Galaxy for Food. Dark Horse Books. 2017. ISBN 978-1-5067-0165-3. OCLC 950635680.
- Differently Morphous. Dark Horse Books. 2018. ISBN 978-1-5067-1164-5. OCLC 1053611265.
- Will Destroy the Galaxy for Cash. Dark Horse Books. 2020. ISBN 978-1-5067-1511-7. OCLC 1154255211.
- Existentially Challenged. Dark Horse Books. 2021. ISBN 978-1-5067-3359-3. OCLC 1322812492.
- Will Leave the Galaxy for Good. Audible. 2024.

== Other works ==
=== Game Damage ===
Game Damage was a planned video game-centred TV show co-starring Croshaw. A pilot was released on YouTube in December 2008. In October 2009, a trailer for the first season was released. In November 2009, CNET reported that the show was "looking for international funding". The show was ultimately never picked up. In a 2014 interview with Vice, Croshaw stated that he believed the show never saw success because "TV networks tend to be antsy about gaming content because video gaming is one of TV's main competitors".

=== Mana Bar ===
Croshaw was one of four founders of the Mana Bar, an Australian cocktail bar and video gaming lounge. The bar initially opened in Brisbane in 2010, with a second venue opening in Melbourne in 2011. By May 2015, both venues had closed.
