= Mr. Pacman =

US musical group

- Origin: Denver, Colorado, United States
- Genres: Bitpop/gamewave
- Years active: 2001–present
- Members: Mr. Pacman, Silver Ghost, White Tiger, Anarchy Dragon, Cockroach 3030 (former name of Anarchy Dragon)

Mr. Pacman is a bitpop/gamewave band (or as the band calls themselves, "8-bit hero gangsta rock") from Denver, Colorado. Described as a performance art project as well as a band, Mr. Pacman's live shows include martial arts fighting with monsters, 1980s-style retro-futuristic outfits, and their signature Commodore 64-inspired electronic music with a rock attitude. Many Mr. Pacman songs are based on songs from classic video games, such as the Mega Man series.

== History ==
Mr. Pacman started out in 2001 as a project by Denver film school student Avery Rains, who rapped over Commodore 64 video game music. After one such performance, some Japanese exchange students remarked, "Mr. Pacman is awesome!". The name stuck, and Rains as Mr. Pacman now says he's from "Denver, Japan." A running gag based on this is the intentional use of Engrish in the band's e-mail newsletters.

Since 2001, Mr. Pacman has expanded from a solo project to a four-member band; adding first the Silver Ghost, then White Tiger, and finally Cockroach 3030 (now known as Anarchy Dragon). The band has released an EP, a split seven-inch vinyl single, and a full-length album. They have also contributed several tracks to compilation albums. Mr. Pacman was particularly active in the early 2000s, and often played at underground Denver show-spaces like Monkey Mania and Rhinoceropolis. In May 2005, the short film "Half Hour of Power" (called a "violent children's show" by the band) was included with the music video "No Ghosts!" and an interview with Mr. Pacman, among other band-related videos, on Dropframe, an Emmy-winning Colorado PBS show featuring indie films.

Apart from the band, Rains has often appeared as a solo act, as "Mr. Pacman." For several years in the early 2000s, he hosted a weekly "Extreme Karaoke Challenge" at Denver bar The Hi-Dive. Starting in 2002, Rains, as "Mr. Pacman," presented an annual PacFashion show; a fashion exhibition featuring both original fashions, pieces from local Colorado designers, and (one year) Rains' own collection of Power Rangers monster costumes. The shows' fashions were inspired by science fiction, anime, and video games, and included musical performances by Mr. Pacman as well as other indie bands, and continued for several years. Rains also played keytar as "Mr. Pacman" on the Hot IQs track "The New One" in 2004.

Mr. Pacman as a full live band periodically perform in and around Denver with local acts like Little Fyodor and Magic Cyclops, having played as recently as the summer of 2025.

== Equipment ==
Rains sings and plays a keytar live on stage. Although most musicians who use the MOS Technology SID chip do so only in the studio, Rains uses a SidStation, controlled by his keytar, live on stage. The Silver Ghost uses the standard QUERTY keyboard of a Commodore SX-64 as a bass synthesizer, pecking at keyboard keys to create bass-synth tones during live shows. (Daniel Eriksson, who helped design the SidStation, was the first to use a Sidstation live on stage, at mekke 2000; Goto80 was the first to use a SID chip live onstage at the ECC in 1993.) The rest of the band play standard "rock" drums and electric guitar.

== Press and awards ==
In the early 2000s, The Denver Post put Mr. Pacman on its "Top 10 Underground Bands of Colorado" list in 2002 (placing 7th that year), 2003 (5th), 2004 (5th), 2005 (8th) and 2006 (14th). Denver alternative newspaper Westword named Mr. Pacman "Best Bizarro Fashion/Rock Act" in 2002 as part of its "Best of Denver" awards, and Mr. Pacman was dubbed "Best Reunion of a Band That Never Broke Up" by the publication in 2011.

== Discography ==
=== Turbotron EP (2002) ===
1. Intro
2. Turbotron
3. Pacman Rap (Shout-out by Wesley Willis)
4. Neurotica
5. Be the Zero
6. O.P.A (Original Party Animal)
7. Welcome to the Future (Sucks)
8. The End
9. Girls That Go Boom (featuring Ozzy Osmond)

*Trivia: The cover photo was taken on a karaoke night at Armida's Mexican Restaurant in Denver "just prior to getting kicked out". O.P.A. is a mix of 6 different performances of the song at the Scott Baio Army Fourth of July party; during the instrumental for each, Mr. Pacman chugged a 40-oz. malt liquor.

=== 7" vinyl split with Magicyclops ===
1. Mr. Pacman: Baby's on Fire (Originally by Brian Eno)
2. Magic Cyclops: Abracadabra (Originally by Steve Miller Band)

=== Star Hustler (2003) ===
1. Gangsta Pac (Contains a sample from the movie Colors)
2. (rock) Star Hustler (with Magicyclops)
3. Pacman Densu (feat. Monotrona)
4. Lifeless
5. Pacman Power
6. Be the Hero (feat. Sara Thorpe; a Fischerspooner-like reinterpretation of "Be the Zero" from Turbotron)
7. Turbo Attack!
8. Mr. Pacman International
9. No Ghosts!
10. Luxury Car
11. Pacman Birthday (feat. Monotrona)
12. The Ninja
13. Paxcercise (feat. Bebe & Serge; based on "Deflektor" by Ben Daglish)
14. (porn) Star Hustler (feat. Sara Thorpe & Claudine; an alternate version of "(rock) Star Hustler")
15. Let's Go! (various video game samples)
16. Songjacked

*This is an enhanced CD. Included on the disc are the videos for Be the Hero, No Ghosts!, Luxury Car, and Paxcercise. The album was named 2003's Best Local CD of the Year by the Denver Post. The "limo tank" on the cover was a toy designed & built by Greg Hignight. It is said to shoot diamonds and run on Hennessy Private Reserve.
