= Monotrona =

American singer

- Origin: Chicago, IL
- Genres: Experimental Music, Noise Music, Electronic Music, Electronica
- Years active: 1996–2003
- Labels: Menlo Park Recordings, Eerie Materials, Self-published (online)
- Website: Archived Site

Monotrona was a one-woman musical/performance group active from 1996 to 2003 founded by Jodie Baltazar, also known as Jodie Mechanic. Monotrona performed in costume and in character as one of many self-styled Superbeings or Fourteen Impersonations of Man These Superbeings took the form of marginally or partially human figures such as apes, robots, ghosts, madmen, or giants with the additional perk that they possessed (or thought they possessed) superhuman powers.

All told, Monotrona evoked eight of these impersonations: Gorditz from Gorditz, Ooka, Jing Pow Ki Poo, Joey the Mechanical Boy, Hawkeye & Firebird, The Might Mun, Burglemir Frost Giant of the Supersphere, and Nakadai the Samurai.

== Music and Performance ==
Monotrona shows and music are notoriously difficult to categorize but have been described as “a perfect balance between silliness and creepiness, not to mention … the best thing to happen to the sputtering corpse of electro since asymmetrical haircuts.” In a 1996 interview with local Portland ‘zine Snipehunt, Monotrona mused: “When you do stuff like this where you’re being kind of goofy anyway--if you don’t spread that goofiness, then you’ve failed.” She was even voted “Scariest Musical Performer” in Portland in 1996. This combination of fright and fun was perfectly captured when Monotrona performed on the kids’ dance show Chic-a-go-go in 1998.

Others took a more serious viewpoint of Monotrona. Tom Moody, for example, describes her as a "post-feminist, posthuman musician/performance artist" and indeed a closer look at the lyrics reveals a recurring tension between that which is human and that which is not. Joey the Mechanical Boy, for example, concerns a boy who thinks he is controlled by a dark machine force: "The dark force is on his way / He will take you to his place / That’s the place where all machines live / There are no people there / No bodies that easily break / No emotions to fake / It's time you all cleared the room / Because the machine is more powerful than you." And indeed, when the performances are taken as a whole, Monotrona's work seems to be less about fright and fun then about exploring the various limits of humanness. One of her last incarnations, Burglemir, laments: "I’d like a coat and one pair of shoes / To touch the earth as only a man can do / Look at this world: it’s so damn small / My foot's a mountain and I'd like to squash it all / But I can't squash a thing because I'm not a man not a human being / Brutality’s for men, not for Superbeings."

Roctober Magazine wrote in its one-man band issue: "...as long as we can dance to the magical sounds of Monotrona, who really needs the answers?" For those who do, there seem to be plenty of them in Monotrona's music and performances. Either way, there is general consensus that Monotrona was a fearless and enthusiastic performer with the ability to "reduce crowds of hipsters to slack-jawed awe."

== History ==
Monotrona grew out of the Chicago noise rock band Duotron and was formed in April 1996 when Jodie moved to Portland, Oregon and Duotron disbanded.

Monotrona's early performances (1996–1997) utilized drums and metal percussion, played while standing up, along with electronics, which Jodie built herself and played with her feet. These early performances include Gorditz, Ooka, and Jing Pow Ki Poo. Some of the homemade electronics in these performances include a sine-wave generator, square-wave generator, baby monitors, heart monitors, PZM microphones attached to drums, toy drum machines, and a Wollensak reel-to-reel tape recorder. As Joey the Mechanical Boy, Monotrona used a Casio keyboard and modified children's toys attached to her arms.

In 1998 Monotrona moved to New York City, dispensed with actual instruments, and began using video game and other electronic samples. Beginning with Hawekeye and Firebird and continuing with The Might Mun, Monotrona used SID samples and songs from early video game music, as well as samples generated using the Elektron Sidstation. In the spring of 1999 Casey Spooner of Fischerspooner performed as Hawekeye and Firebird and even dressed in Monotrona's costume when she was unable to make her show.

In 2001, with Burglemir Frost Giant of the Supersphere Monotrona began using the MC505 and Elektron Sidstation to compose songs. During this time, a single appeared on an Electroclash compilation though she had no formal affiliation with the movement. One reviewer suggested her primary effect on that movement was to ‘befuddle the beautiful.’

In 2003, Monotrona created the character Nakadai the Samurai. She sang on and later covered two songs by gamewave band Mr. Pacman and put words to a song by Polish gamewaver Palsecam.

Monotrona performed her last show on February 14, 2003 when she was eight months pregnant, though many of her songs are now available free online as MP3s.

== Discography ==
=== Albums ===
- Hawkeye & Firebird (Menlo Park, 2002)
- Ooka Meets Jing Pow Ki Poo (Eerie Materials, 1998)

=== Compilations ===
- Might Mun/We evil sin (K48 Volume 4, 2004)
- Canned Hamm/Platonic Friend remix (Pro-Am, 2003)
- Hawkeye & Firebird/Cadillac Fantasy, Chic-a-go-go (Roctober, 2002)
- Hawkeye & Firebird/Tekul, Electroclash Vol. 1 (Mogul, 2000)
- Might Mun/The Creature, Momus Manhattan Folkways (Momus, 1999)
