= List of Knights of Sidonia volumes =

Knights of Sidonia is a Japanese manga series by Tsutomu Nihei. It was serialized in Kodansha's Monthly Afternoon magazine from April 2009 to September 2015. Its chapters were compiled in 15 tankōbon volumes, released between September 23, 2009, and November 20, 2015. It was later republished in seven shinsōban volumes, released between October 23 and December 22, 2017.

The manga has been licensed in North America by Vertical, who released all volumes in English between February 5, 2013, and April 26, 2016. It was later republished in seven omnibus volumes under the title Knights of Sidonia Master Edition from April 9, 2019, to October 13, 2020; each omnibus volume compiled three-and-a-half regular volumes.

== Volume list ==
No.	Original release date	Original ISBN	English release date	English ISBN
1	September 23, 2009	978-4-06-314597-7	February 5, 2013	978-1-93565-480-3 (print); 978-1-94122-002-3 (digital)
1. "Nagate Tanikaze's Choice" (谷風長道の選択, Tanikaze Nagate no Sentaku); 2. "Nagate Tanikaze's Maiden Battle" (谷風長道の初陣, Tanikaze Nagate no Uijin); 3. "Eiko Yamano's Starry Heavens" (山野栄子の星空, Yamano Eiko no Hoshizora); 4. "Norio Kunato's Fury" (岐神海苔夫の激昂, Kunato Norio no Gekikō); 5. "Mochikuni Akai's Glory" (赤井持国の栄光, Akai Mochikuni no Eikō)
2	February 23, 2010	978-4-06-310633-6	April 16, 2013	978-1-93565-481-0 (print); 978-1-94122-003-0 (digital)
6. "Mochikuni Akai's Kabizashi" (赤井持国のカビザシ, Akai Mochikuni no Kabizashi); 7. "Shizuka Hoshijiro's Rescue" (星白閑の捜索, Hoshijiro Shizuka no Sōsaku); 8. "Nagate Tanikaze's Return" (谷風長道の帰艦, Tanikaze Nagate no Kikan); 9. "Shizuka Hoshijiro's Salute" (星白閑の敬礼, Hoshijiro Shizuka no Keirei); 10. "The Twenty-Eighth Captain's Decision" (第二十八代艦長の決断, Dai Ni Jū Hachi-dai Kanchō no Ketsudan)
3	July 23, 2010	978-4-06-310680-0	June 4, 2013	978-1-93565-482-7 (print); 978-1-94122-004-7 (digital)
11. "Shizuka Hoshijiro's Return" (星白閑の帰艦, Hoshijiro Shizuka no Kikan); 12. "Numi Tahiro's Weekly Meal" (田寛ヌミの週一食, Tahiro Numi no Shūichishoku); 13. "Izana Shinatose's Sigh" (科戸瀬イザナの溜息, Shinatose Izana no Tameiki); 14. "The Ship's Immortal Crew" (不死の船員会, Fushi no Sen'in-kai); 15. "Hiroki Saito's Spree" (斎藤ヒロキの暴走, Saitō Hiroki no Bōsō)
4	December 22, 2010	978-4-06-310716-6	August 6, 2013	978-1-93565-489-6 (print); 978-1-94122-005-4 (digital)
16. "Izana Shinatose's Maiden Battle" (科戸瀬イザナの初陣, Shinatose Izana no Uijin); 17. "Nagate Tanikaze's Resolve" (谷風長道の決意, Tanikaze Nagate no Ketsui); 18. "Scientist Ochiai's Daughter" (科学者落合の娘, Kagakusha Ochiai no Musume); 19. "The Dream Izana Shinatose Had" (科戸瀬イザナが見た夢, Shinatose Izana ga Mita Yume); 20. "Norio Kunato's Turmoil" (岐神海苔夫の葛藤, Kunato Norio no Kattō)
5	May 23, 2011	978-4-06-310753-1	October 15, 2013	978-1-93565-499-5 (print); 978-1-94122-006-1 (digital)
21. "The Hawk Moth's Gaze" (紅天蛾の眼差し, Benisuzume no Manazashi); 22. "Scientist Ochiai's Scheme" (科学者落合の陰謀, Kagakusha Ochiai no Inbō); 23. "The Asteroid's Approach" (小惑星の接近, Shōwakusei no Sekkin); 24. "723's Embrace" (723の抱擁, 723 no Hōyō); 25. "First Platoon's Grind" (第一小隊の奮闘, Dai Ichi Shōtai no Funtō)
6	October 21, 2011	978-4-06-310783-8	December 10, 2013	978-1-93223-491-6 (print); 978-1-94122-007-8 (digital)
26. "The Asteroid's Collision" (小惑星の衝突, Shōwakusei no Shōtotsu); 27. "Toha Heavy Industries' Resumption" (東亜重工の再始動, Tōa Jūkō no Saishidō); 28. "Placenta-Hoshijiro's Impregnation" (エナ星白の受胎, Ena Hoshijiro no Jutai); 29. "Yure Shinatose's Hesitation" (科戸瀬ユレの逡巡, Shinatose Yure no ShunJun); 30. "Ren Honoka's Determination" (仄煉の決意, Honoka Ren no Ketsui)
7	March 23, 2012	978-4-06-387812-7	February 11, 2014	978-1-93913-002-0 (print); 978-1-94122-026-9 (digital)
31. "Shizuka Hoshijiro's Daughter" (星白閑の娘, Hoshijiro Shizuka no Musume); 32. "Tsumugi Shiraui's Public Debut" (白羽衣つむぎの御目見え, Shiraui Tsumugi no Omemie); 33. "Tsumugi Shiraui's Capabilities" (白羽衣つむぎの能力, Shiraui Tsumugi no Nōryoku); 34. "Clearing the Ocarina–Part One" (オカリナ攻略戦 前編, Okarina Kōryaku Sen Zenpen); 35. "Clearing the Ocarina–Part Two" (オカリナ攻略戦 後編, Okarina Kōryaku Sen Kōhen)
8	July 23, 2012	978-4-06-387833-2	April 8, 2014	978-1-93913-021-1 (print); 978-1-94122-027-6 (digital)
36. "The Greater Cluster Ship's Rumbling" (大シュガフ船の鳴動, Dai Shugafu-sen no Meidō); 37. "Tsumugi Shiraui's Longing" (白羽衣つむぎの願望, Shiraui Tsumugi no Ganbō); 38. "Tsumugi Shiraui's Yearning" (白羽衣つむぎの思慕, Shiraui Tsumugi no Shibo); 39. "Approach to Planet Nine" (惑星ナインへの侵入, Wakusei Nain e no Shinnyū)
9	December 21, 2012	978-4-06-387853-0	June 3, 2014	978-1-93913-022-8 (print); 978-1-94122-028-3 (digital)
40. "A Mere Two Unit's Rescue Force" (たった二機の救出部隊, Tatta Ni Ki no Kyūshutsu Butai); 41. "Nagate Tanikaze's Land Battle" (谷風長道の陸戦, Tanikaze Nagate no Rikusen); 42. "Shizuka Hoshijiro's Shape and Form" (星白閑の形象, Hoshijiro Shizuka no Keishō); 43. "Pilot Tsuruuchi's Blues" (弦打操縦士の憂鬱, Tsuruuchi Sōjūshi no Yūutsu); 44. "Yuhata Midorikawa's Decision" (緑川纈の決断, Midorikawa Yuhata no Ketsudan)
10	May 23, 2013	978-4-06-387886-8	August 5, 2014	978-1-93913-090-7 (print); 978-1-94122-029-0 (digital)
45. "The Honoka Sisters' House Raid" (仄姉妹の家宅捜査, Honoka Shimai no Kataku Sōsa); 46. "Kanata's Start–Part One" (かなたのはじまり 前編, Kanata no Hajimari Zenpen); 47. "Kanata's Start–Part Two" (かなたのはじまり 後編, Kanata no Hajimari Kōhen); 48. "A Contingent Criticality Weapon's Development" (臨界不測兵器の開発, Rinkai Fusoku Heiki no Kaihatsu); 49. "Nagate Tanikaze's Top Secret Assignment" (谷風長道の極秘任務, Tanikaze Nagete no Gokuhi Ninmu)
11	October 23, 2013	978-4-06-387928-5	October 7, 2014	978-1-93913-091-4 (print); 978-1-94122-030-6 (digital)
50. "The Pacifists' Last Trace" (非武装主義者の痕跡, Hibusōshugisha no Konseki); 51. "The Survivor's Rescue" (遭難者の救出, Sōnansha no Kyūshutsu); 52. "Lalah Hiyama's Exertions" (ヒ山ララァの奮闘, Hiyama Rarā no Funtō); 53. "The Greater Cluster Ship's Presence" (大シュガフ船の存在, Daishugafusen no Sonzai); 54. "Teruru Ichigaya's Conversion" (市ヶ谷テルルの転向, Ichigaya Teruru no Tenkō)
12	March 20, 2014	978-4-06-387965-0	December 2, 2014	978-1-93913-099-0 (print); 978-1-94122-031-3 (digital)
55. "The Mizuki's Launch" (水城の出艦, Mizuki no Shukkan); 56. "The Gauna's Shapelessness" (不定形のガウナ, Futeikei no Gauna); 57. "Sho Honoka's Rescue" (仄炒の救出, Honoka Shō no Kyūshutsu); 58. "The Mizuki's Capabilities" (水城の能力, Mizuki no Nōryoku); 59. "The Sun Lem's Gravity" (恒星レムの引力, Kōsei Remu no Inryoku)
13	August 22, 2014	978-4-06-387991-9; 978-4-06-358707-4 (LE)	March 10, 2015	978-1-94122-032-0 (print); 978-1-94122-036-8 (digital)
60. "The Semiautonomous Conversion Organ's Placement" (半自律式転換機構の設置, Han-jiritsushiki Tenkan Kikō no Setchi); 61. "The New Pilots' Maiden Battle–Part One" (新操縦士の初陣 前編, Shinsōjūshi no Uijin Zenpen); 62. "The New Pilots' Maiden Battle–Part Two" (新操縦士の初陣 後編, Shinsōjūshi no Uijin Kōhen); 63. "Tsumugi Shiraui's Dream" (白羽衣つむぎの夢, Shiraui Tsumugi no Yume); 64. "Kanata's Dismantlement" (かなたの解体, Kanata no Kaitai)
14	February 23, 2015	978-4-06-388033-5	September 29, 2015	978-1-94122-086-3 (print); 978-1-94122-087-0 (digital)
65. "Scientist Ochiai's Reincarnation" (科学者落合の転生, Kagaku-sha Ochiai no Tensei); 66. "Captain Kobayashi's Lingering Attachment" (小林艦長の未練, Kobayashi Kanchō no Miren); 67. "The Attack Fleets' Pinch" (攻撃艦隊の危機, Kōgeki Kantai no Kiki); 68. "Nagate Tanikaze's Restlessness" (谷風長道の焦燥, Tanikaze Nagate no Shōsō); 69. "Norio Kunato's Comeback" (岐神海苔夫の復帰, Kunato Norio no Fukki); 70. "The Series Two-Zero's Sortie" (二零(ニーゼロ)式の出撃, Nīzero-shiki no Shutsugeki)
15	November 20, 2015	978-4-06-388102-8; 978-4-06-358791-3 (LE)	April 26, 2016	978-1-94299-313-1 (print); 978-1-68233-263-4 (digital)
71. "Attack Fleet One's Call" (第一攻撃艦隊の決断, Dai Ichi Kōgeki Kantai no Ketsudan); 72. "Tsumugi's Willfulness" (つむぎの我儘, Tsumugi no Wagamama); 73. "Attack Fleet One's Interception" (第一攻撃艦隊の迎撃, Dai Ichi Kōgeki Kantai no Geigeki); 74. "Captain Kobayashi's Determination" (小林艦長の覚悟, Kobayashi Kanchō no Kakugo); 75. "The Kunato Team's Fight" (岐神班の戦い, Kunato Han no Tatakai); 76. "The Cluster Ship Fleet's Counterattack" (シュガフ船団の逆襲, Shugafu Sendan no Gyakushū); 77. "Sidonia's Knight" (シドニアの騎士, Shidonia no Kishi); 78. "The Gauna War's Conclusion" (ガウナとの終戦, Gauna to no Shūsen)

== Master Edition volume list ==
No.	Original release date	Original ISBN	English release date	English ISBN
1	October 23, 2017	978-4-06-510569-6	April 9, 2019	978-1-94719-442-7
2	October 23, 2017	978-4-06-510562-7	July 9, 2019	978-1-94719-443-4
3	November 21, 2017	978-4-06-510563-4	October 8, 2019	978-1-94719-482-3
4	November 21, 2017	978-4-06-510565-8	January 14, 2020	978-1-94998-001-1
5	November 21, 2017	978-4-06-510567-2	April 14, 2020	978-1-94998-017-2
6	December 22, 2017	978-4-06-510590-0	July 21, 2020	978-1-94998-042-4
7	December 22, 2017	978-4-06-510591-7	October 13, 2020	978-1-94998-074-5
