= Princess Resurrection =

Japanese manga series by Yasunori Mitsunaga and its adaptations

- First tankōbon volume cover, featuring Lillianne von Phoenix, also known as Hime

怪物王女 (Kaibutsu Ōjo)
- Genre: Dark comedy; Horror fantasy
- Manga
- Written by: Yasunori Mitsunaga
- Published by: Kodansha
- English publisher: NA: Del Rey Manga (former); Kodansha USA (current; digital)
- Magazine: Monthly Shōnen Sirius
- Original run: 25 June 2005 – 26 February 2013
- Volumes: 20
- Anime television series
- Directed by: Masayuki Sakoi
- Produced by: Kozue Kaneniwa; Makoto Sato; Yukiko Ninokata; Yūka Sakurai; Jun’ichirō Tanaka; Kentarō Hori; Takayuki Kanai
- Written by: Kazuyuki Fudeyasu
- Music by: Mikiya Katakura
- Studio: Madhouse
- Licensed by: AUS: Siren Visual; NA: Sentai Filmworks; UK: Manga Entertainment
- Original network: TBS, BS-i, CBC, KBS Kyoto
- English network: NA: Anime Network
- Original run: 13 April 2007 – 28 September 2007
- Episodes: 26 (24 + 2 extra episodes)
- Original video animation
- Directed by: Keiichiro Kawaguchi
- Produced by: Kensuke Tateishi; Takashi Yamaguchi; Riichiro Umezu (1–2); Jō Tsukamoto (3)
- Music by: Makoto Takou
- Studio: Tatsunoko Productions
- Released: 9 December 2010 – 7 October 2011
- Episodes: 3
- Manga

Naqua-Den
- Written by: Yasunori Mitsunaga
- Published by: Kodansha
- Magazine: Monthly Shōnen Sirius
- Original run: 25 February 2012 – 26 September 2014
- Volumes: 6
- Manga

Princess Resurrection Nightmare
- Written by: Yasunori Mitsunaga
- Published by: Kodansha
- English publisher: NA: Kodansha USA (digital)
- Magazine: Monthly Shōnen Sirius
- Original run: 25 November 2017 – 26 March 2021
- Volumes: 7
- icon

Princess Resurrection (Japanese: 怪物王女, Hepburn: Kaibutsu Ōjo; lit. 'Monster Princess') is a Japanese manga series written and illustrated by Yasunori Mitsunaga. It was serialized in Kodansha's shōnen manga magazine Monthly Shōnen Sirius from June 2005 to February 2013, with its chapters collected in 20 tankōbon volumes. The manga was licensed in North America by Del Rey Manga and later by Kodansha USA.

A 26-episode anime television series adaptation produced by Madhouse was broadcast on TBS from April to September 2007. A three-episode original video animation (OVA) adaptation produced by Tatsunoko Production was released from December 2010 to October 2011. The anime television series was licensed in North America by Sentai Filmworks.

A spin-off manga series, Naqua-Den, was serialized in Monthly Shōnen Sirius from February 2012 to September 2014, with its chapters collected in six tankōbon volumes. A sequel series, titled Princess Resurrection Nightmare, was serialized from November 2017 to March 2021, with its chapters collected in seven tankōbon volumes.

== Plot ==
Hiro Hiyorimi is a boy who has just moved to "Sasanaki Village" to meet his sister, who has recently been employed by a mysterious young woman that prefers to be called "Hime". Hiro encounters Hime by chance when she and her short yet strong gynoid bodyguard, Flandre, arrive; sacrificing himself to push Hime out of the way of a speeding car. However, Hiro suddenly finds himself alive, initially confused as he encounters Hime and unconsciously defends her during her fight with a werewolf. Hime explains that she is a member of the royal family of the Monster Realm which co-exists with the Earth-Realm, revealing her family possess the power to temporarily revive the dead as half-immortals bound to serve and protect them. Despite her disinterest, Hime is caught in a war of succession among her siblings for the Monster Kingdom's throne. The story then follows Hiro helping Hime fend off her siblings' supernatural assassins as they are joined by a half-werewolf named Riza and the vampire Reiri, Hime's younger sister, Sherwood, and her android bodyguard, Francisca, as their neighbors.

== Media ==
=== Manga ===
Written and illustrated by Yasunori Mitsunaga, Princess Resurrection was serialized in Kodansha's shōnen manga magazine Monthly Shōnen Sirius from 25 June 2005 to 26 February 2013. Kodansha collected its chapters in 20 tankōbon volumes, released from 23 January 2006 to 9 April 2013.

In North America, the manga licensed by Del Rey Manga in 2006; seven volumes were released from 1 May 2007 to 24 November 2009. In June 2016, Kodansha USA announced that it would release the series digitally. The 20 volumes were released from 26 July 2016 to 21 November 2017.

A spin-off manga series, titled Naqua-Den (南Q阿伝, Nakuaden), was serialized in Monthly Shōnen Sirius from 25 February 2012 to 26 September 2014. Kodansha collected its chapters in six volumes, released from 9 November 2012 to 9 December 2014.

A sequel series, titled Princess Resurrection Nightmare (怪物王女ナイトメア, Kaibutsu Ōjo Naitomea), was serialized in Monthly Shōnen Sirius from 25 November 2017 to 26 March 2021. Kodansha collected its chapters in seven volumes, released from 9 May 2018 to 6 August 2021. In September 2018, Kodansha USA announced that they had license the manga for digital release in English. The seven volumes were released from 30 October 2018 to 4 January 2022.

==== Volumes ====
No.	Original release date	Original ISBN	English release date	English ISBN
1	23 January 2006	978-4-06-373010-4	1 May 2007 (Del Rey); 26 July 2016 (Kodansha)	978-0-345-49664-5 (Del Rey); 978-1-6823-3318-1 (Kodansha)
2	23 May 2006	978-4-06-373025-8	28 August 2007 (Del Rey); 26 July 2016 (Kodansha)	978-0-345-49682-9 (Del Rey); 978-1-6823-3319-8 (Kodansha)
3	22 December 2006	978-4-06-373048-7	8 April 2008 (Del Rey); 3 August 2016 (Kodansha)	978-0-345-50140-0 (Del Rey); 978-1-6823-3320-4 (Kodansha)
4	6 April 2007	978-4-06-373068-5	26 August 2008 (Del Rey); 6 September 2016 (Kodansha)	978-0-345-50667-2 (Del Rey); 978-1-6823-3321-1 (Kodansha)
5	23 August 2007	978-4-06-373079-1	27 January 2009 (Del Rey); 20 September 2016 (Kodansha)	978-0-345-50668-9 (Del Rey); 978-1-6823-3345-7 (Kodansha)
6	21 December 2007	978-4-06-373096-8	19 May 2009 (Del Rey); 4 October 2016 (Kodansha)	978-0-345-50806-5 (Del Rey); 978-1-6823-3346-4 (Kodansha)
7	23 May 2008	978-4-06-373118-7	24 November 2009 (Del Rey); 18 October 2016 (Kodansha)	978-0-345-51428-8 (Del Rey); 978-1-6823-3347-1 (Kodansha)
8	3 April 2009	978-4-06-373143-9	6 December 2016	978-1-6823-3477-5
9	22 May 2009	978-4-06-373173-6	21 February 2017	978-1-6823-3478-2
10	20 November 2009	978-4-06-373194-1	21 March 2017	978-1-6823-3622-9
11	23 February 2010	978-4-06-376207-5	4 April 2017	978-1-6823-3615-1
12	9 July 2010	978-4-06-376223-5	25 April 2017	978-1-6823-3658-8
13	9 December 2010	978-4-06-376245-7	9 May 2017	978-1-6823-3697-7
14	9 March 2011	978-4-06-376258-7	23 May 2017	978-1-6823-3698-4
15	9 June 2011	978-4-06-376270-9	6 June 2017	978-1-6823-3699-1
16	7 October 2011	978-4-06-376299-0	25 July 2017	978-1-6823-3725-7
17	9 February 2012	978-4-06-376319-5	22 August 2017	978-1-6823-3795-0
18	8 June 2012	978-4-06-376345-4	26 September 2017	978-1-6823-3796-7
19	9 November 2012	978-4-06-376365-2	24 October 2017	978-1-6823-3864-3
20	9 April 2013	978-4-06-376391-1	21 November 2017	978-1-6823-3958-9

=== Anime ===
A 26-episode anime television series adaptation, produced by Madhouse and directed by Masayuki Sakoi, was broadcast on TBS, BS-i, and KBS Kyoto from 13 April to 28 September 2007. The opening theme song is "Blood Queen" by Aki Misato and the ending theme is "Hizamazuite Ashi o Oname" (跪いて足をお嘗め; "Kneel Down and Lick My Feet") by Ali Project. An original soundtrack album, Princess Resurrection: Original Soundtrack – Sympathy for the Belonephobia (怪物王女 オリジナル・サウンドトラック Sympathy for the Belonephobia, Kaibutsu Ōjo Orijinaru Saundotorakku Shinpashī fō za Beronefobia), was released on 3 October 2007; with the exception of Blood Queen, each song was produced by a member of Ali Project.

In North America, the series was licensed for English release by ADV Films in 2008. The series was released under the Sentai Filmworks licensing company and label on two DVD sets, in Japanese with English subtitles, on 17 March and 19 May 2009. The entire series was later released on a single DVD volume, in Japanese with English subtitles, on 3 August 2010 and with an English dub on 17 January 2012. It was licensed in Australia and New Zealand by Siren Visual and released on DVD on 23 March 2012; it was later licensed by Madman Entertainment and released on DVD on 2 June 2021. It was licensed in the United Kingdom by Manga Entertainment and released on DVD on 10 September 2012.

Three original video animation (OVA) episodes, produced by Tatsunoko Production, were bundled with the limited-edition of the 13th, 14th and 16th manga volumes, respectively, which were released on 9 December 2010; 9 March; and 7 October 2011, respectively.

== Reception ==
In Jason Thompson's online appendix to Manga: The Complete Guide, he describes the series' plot as being "fun and fast-paced", with "imaginative" action scenes. He also appreciated the manga's references to "classic movie monsters".

== See also ==
- Avarth, another manga series by the same author
- Isekai Sniper wa Onna Senshi no Mofumofu Pet, another manga series by the same author
- Time Stop Hero, another manga series by the same author
