= Aposimz =

Japanese manga series by Tsutomu Nihei

- Cover of the first volume

人形の国 (Ningyō no Kuni)
- Genre: Adventure; Dark fantasy; Science fiction
- Manga
- Written by: Tsutomu Nihei
- Published by: Kodansha
- English publisher: NA: Vertical
- Imprint: Sirius KC
- Magazine: Monthly Shōnen Sirius
- Original run: February 25, 2017 – August 26, 2021
- Volumes: 9
- icon

Aposimz (stylized in all caps), known in Japan as Ningyō no Kuni (人形の国; lit. 'Country of Dolls'), is a Japanese manga series written and illustrated by Tsutomu Nihei. It was serialized in Kodansha's shōnen manga magazine Monthly Shōnen Sirius from February 2017 to August 2021, with its chapters collected in nine tankōbon volumes.

== Setting ==
The series takes place on an artificial celestial body known as Aposimz (アポシムズ, Aposhimuzu), which is 200,000 kilometers in diameter. Most of the planet's volume is occupied by its core, which is covered by a superstructural shell. Five thousand years ago, people who lost a war against the inhabitants of the core were exiled to the surface, a cold and harsh environment. Surface dwellers face both the rapidly spreading Frame Disease (人形病, Ningyō-byō), which slowly converts normal humans into biomechanical, zombie-like beings, and native biomechanical creatures known as automatons. Certain people have been transformed by special "codes" into Regular Frames (正規人形, Seiki Ningyō), beings composed of a substance called placenta (胞衣, ena) and fueled by Heigus Particles (ヘイグス粒子, Heigusu Ryūshi), which renders them biologically immortal and makes them stronger and more resilient than normal humans. Regular Frames are also able to assume an armored form, and most have a unique special ability or weapon. These Regular Frames are highly revered by normal humans and are often leaders and protectors in their communities.

== Characters ==
Etherow (エスロー, Esurō)
The sole survivor of the White Diamond Beam (白菱の梁, Hakubishi no Hari) settlement after the Rebedoa Empire (リベドア帝国, Ribedoa Teikoku) destroys it. After being transformed into a Regular Frame, he seeks revenge upon the Empire. His armored form is colored in deep red with stripes of white and features a miniature railgun embedded in the left forearm known as an EBTG, which allows him to fire a variety of ammunition from his body's own solidified placenta to the incredibly powerful Anti-Megastructure Bullets.
Titania (タイターニア, Taitānia)
An intelligent automaton who provides Etherow with the code that transforms him into a Regular Frame as well as seven Anti-Megastructure Bullets (AMBs). She journeys with Etherow as his guide and confidant. Her normal form is that of a small four-legged creature, but she can temporarily assume a humanoid form. However, this transformation consumes a large amount of energy, and she is only able to change once a day.
Keisha (ケーシャ, Kēsha)
The princess of the underground settlement of Irf Nikk (イルフ・ニク, Irufu Niku) and a Regular Frame who eventually joins Etherow and Titania. Her armored form possesses a staff weapon that can extend to great lengths and is able to channel electricity.
Wasabu (ワサブ)
A Regular Frame and former member of the Rebedoa Empire's Reincarnated (転生者, Tensei-sha) who joins Etherow's group. As a Regular Frame, Wasabu is capable of reinforcing himself in armor. He is only able to fly.

== Publication ==
Aposimz is written and illustrated by Tsutomu Nihei. Nihei published a one-shot in Kodansha's seinen manga magazine Weekly Young Magazine on May 9, 2016. In November 2016, it was announced that the manga would be serialized in Monthly Shōnen Sirius, being the first time that Nihei would publish a manga in a shōnen manga magazine. The series ran in the magazine from February 25, 2017, to August 26, 2021. Kodansha collected its 54 chapters in nine tankōbon volumes, released from May 9, 2017, to December 9, 2021. Kodansha also started publishing a full-color edition of the series on November 8, 2019, and five volumes have been released as of August 8, 2022.

The manga was simultaneously published in English by ComiXology and Crunchyroll Manga. In November 2017, Vertical announced that they would release the series in print. The volumes were released from October 9, 2018, to June 28, 2022.

=== Volumes ===
No.	Original release date	Original ISBN	English release date	English ISBN
1	May 9, 2017	978-4-06-390706-3	October 9, 2018	978-1-94719-430-4
2	February 9, 2018	978-4-06-510937-3; 978-4-06-510975-5 (LE)	January 15, 2019	978-1-94719-444-1
3	September 7, 2018	978-4-06-395307-7; 978-4-06-513528-0 (LE)	June 18, 2019	978-1-94719-481-6
4	April 9, 2019	978-4-06-515256-0	January 28, 2020	978-1-94719-496-0
5	November 8, 2019	978-4-06-517554-5	September 8, 2020	978-1-94998-036-3
6	May 8, 2020	978-4-06-519616-8	January 19, 2021	978-1-94998-066-0
7	November 9, 2020	978-4-06-521161-8; 978-4-06-521180-9 (LE)	July 6, 2021	978-1-64729-055-9
8	April 30, 2021	978-4-06-523002-2; 978-4-06-523951-3 (LE)	January 18, 2022	978-1-64729-061-0
9	December 9, 2021	978-4-06-526219-1; 978-4-06-526220-7 (LE)	June 28, 2022	978-1-64729-100-6

== Reception ==
By February 2018, the manga had 250,000 copies in circulation.
