= Blame! (film) =

2017 Japanese animated film by Hiroyuki Seshita

- Release poster
- Directed by: Hiroyuki Seshita
- Screenplay by: Sadayuki Murai
- Story by: Tsutomu Nihei
- Based on: Blame! by Tsutomu Nihei
- Produced by: Shuzo John Shiota
- Starring: Takahiro Sakurai; Kana Hanazawa; Sora Amamiya; Kazuhiro Yamaji; Mamoru Miyano; Aya Suzaki; Nobunaga Shimazaki; Yuki Kaji; Aki Toyosaki; Saori Hayami
- Cinematography: Mitsunori Kataama
- Edited by: Hiromi Amanai
- Music by: Yugo Kanno
- Production company: Polygon Pictures
- Distributed by: Netflix
- Release date: May 19, 2017
- Running time: 106 minutes
- Country: Japan
- Language: Japanese

Blame! (stylized in all caps) is a 2017 Japanese animated science fiction action film directed by Hiroyuki Seshita, produced by Polygon Pictures, written by Sadayuki Murai and based on the manga series Blame!, which was written and illustrated by Tsutomu Nihei. It was released on Netflix on May 19, 2017.

== Plot ==
In the distant future, civilization has reached its ultimate Net-based form. An infection in the past caused the automated systems to spiral out of control, resulting in a multi-leveled city structure that grows indefinitely in all directions. Now humanity has lost access to the city's controls and is hunted down to be purged as "illegal" by the defense system known as the Safeguard. In a village, a tribe known as the Electro-Fishers is facing eventual extinction, trapped between the threat of the Safeguard and dwindling food supplies. A girl named Zuru goes on a journey to find food with a group of friends, only to inadvertently trigger a Watchtower which spawns robotic exterminators. Most of her companions are killed, but Zuru and her close friend Tae are saved by a mysterious wanderer, Killy.

Killy is brought to the village, where he meets Pop, their leader, who is interested in Killy after learning that he comes from 6000 levels below. Killy reveals that he is on a quest to find someone with the Net Terminal Gene, which would allow accessing the Netsphere and regaining control of the city. Killy solves the village's food problem by passing them a large number of rations. He leaves for an area below the village named the Rotting Shrine, and followed by Zuru and Tae, he finds the spoilt machine-corpse of Cibo, a former scientist from before the disaster. Cibo reveals that she built a shield generator that protects the village from the Safeguard and reveals that it is possible to produce more food rations at a nearby automated factory.

Heeding her words, a group of Electro-Fishers including Tae and Zuru travel to the automated factory in search of more rations. Arriving there, Cibo logs into the system and produces a large number of rations, which the Electro-Fishers quickly begin gathering. However, right after she produces a machine for Killy, the system rejects her log-in and starts to mass-produce Exterminators to eliminate the Electro-Fishers. Cibo builds a new body for herself and they all escape through a railway car. During the ride, Killy is knocked unconscious fending off exterminators.

Upon arrival, the Electro-Fishers celebrate the new supplies while also mourning the losses during the trip. Cibo secretly wakes Killy up with only Zuru as a witness and leads him down towards the shield generator with the machine. While heading down, Tae takes her gun to the observatory platform and shoots the shield generator, whereupon it is revealed that the real Tae was killed and impersonated by a Safeguard agent back at the factory. Calling herself Sanakan, she proceeds to kill most of the villagers, deeming them illegal residents while destroying the village in the process.

Killy notices and runs back up to the village. Cibo travels further down, sets the machine and connects herself to it. The village elders frantically lead the rest to the top of the village, resisting Sanakan using their remaining weapons. Killy enters combat with Sanakan, who after knocking him down notes that he is a body stolen from the Safeguard. Zuru throws the gun to Killy and he manages to shoot Sanakan, but not before she destroys Cibo's body.

In the Netsphere, Cibo pleads with the Authority controlling the Safeguard to let the villagers go. She is forbidden to do so, but is instead allowed access to the City's map, revealing an abandoned level safe from Safeguard control where the villagers can migrate to.

Cibo, now functioning through her only remaining arm, leads the remaining villagers to an elevator, but a Watchtower spots them and begins spawning exterminators. Killy throws the device which has been keeping him safe from the Safeguard to Zuru, upon which he says that he still wants to find the Net Terminal Gene, which enables human control of the city and all machines, including the Safeguard. Killy seemingly sacrifices himself so that the villagers can escape.

Later it is revealed that the Electro-Fishers successfully reached the abandoned level and established a new village there. Zuru's granddaughter reminisces of the times when she used to tell her about Killy, hopeful that Killy is still on his quest, which the final shot of the film confirms.

== Voice cast ==
| Role | Japanese | English |
|---|---|---|
| Killy | Takahiro Sakurai | Kyle McCarley |
| Cibo | Kana Hanazawa | Cristina Valenzuela |
| Zuru | Sora Amamiya | Christine Marie Cabanos |
| Sutezo | Mamoru Miyano | Keith Silverstein |
| Tae | Aya Suzaki | Cherami Leigh |
| Fusata | Nobunaga Shimazaki | Bryce Papenbrook |
| Atsuji | Yuki Kaji | Johnny Yong Bosch |
| Shige | Koutarou Nishiyama | Brian Beacock |
| Fuku | Nanako Mori | Reba Buhr |
| Pop | Kazuhiro Yamaji | Michael McConnohie |
| Shizu | Ayane Sakura | Cassandra Lee Morris |
| The Authority | Aki Toyosaki | Karen Strassman |
| Sana-Kan | Saori Hayami | Kira Buckland |

== Production ==
Plans for a full-length CG animated film were announced in 2007. However, this proposed CG film project was not released before Micott and Basara (the studio hired) filed for bankruptcy in 2011.

It was announced in November 2015 that the series would get an anime theatrical film adaptation. The film was directed by Hiroyuki Seshita and written by Tsutomu Nihei and Sadayuki Murai, with animation by Polygon Pictures and character designs by Yuki Moriyama. It was released globally as a Netflix original on May 20, 2017.

== Release ==
Blame! opened in Japanese theaters for a two-week run on May 20, 2017, and was released globally on Netflix on the same day.

On October 5, 2017, Viz Media announced at their New York Comic Con panel that they had licensed the home video rights to Blame! They released the film on Blu-ray Disc and DVD on March 27, 2018.

== Manga ==
A manga adaptation of the film, titled Blame! The Electrofishers' Escape (BLAME! 電基漁師危険階層脱出作戦, Buramu! Denki Ryōshi Kiki Kaisō Dasshutsu Sakusen) and illustrated by Kotaro Sekine, was serialized in Kodansha's Monthly Shōnen Sirius from April 26 to October 26, 2017, and collected into one volume, released on February 9, 2018.

== Reception ==
=== Critical response ===
Michael Nordine of IndieWire rated it B− and wrote that its worth a watch, but the "world-building is more engaging than its plotting". Toussaint Egan of Paste praised the adaptation for being both faithful and opening it to wider appeal, concluding that it is "one of the most conceptually entertaining anime films of late". James Brusuelas of Animation World Network wrote that although the plot is familiar, it is "definitely worth your time".

=== Accolades ===
Blame! won VFX-Japan Awards' 2018 Excellence and Best awards in the Animated Theatrical Film category. It was part of the Jury Selections of the 21st Japan Media Arts Festival in the Animation category.
