= Shōnen no Zankyō =

Japanese manga series

- First tankōbon volume cover

少年の残響
- Manga
- Written by: Mitsunori Zaki
- Published by: Kodansha
- Imprint: Sirius KC
- Magazine: Monthly Shōnen Sirius; (October 2016 – September 2017); Palcy; (May 2018 – September 2021); Comic Days; (October 2021 – March 2022)
- Original run: October 26, 2016 – September 6, 2021
- Volumes: 4
- icon

Shōnen no Zankyō (Japanese: 少年の残響; lit. 'Reverberations of Boys') is a Japanese manga series written and illustrated by Mitsunori Zaki. The manga was first serialized in Kodansha's shōnen manga magazine Monthly Shōnen Sirius from October 2016 to September 2017. It was then transferred to Kodansha's Palcy manga app, where it ran from May 2018 to September 2021, with its chapters collected in four tankōbon volumes as of July 2019.

== Synopsis ==
In an alternate present-day Tokyo, a series of terrorist attacks causes widespread public panic. The perpetrators leave behind only cryptic internet videos as clues. While the police struggle to decipher the messages and stop the bombings, a single detective begins to uncover the true motives behind the crimes.

The attackers are revealed to be two undocumented teenagers known only as Nine and Twelve. Operating under the alias "Sphinx", the pair orchestrates the incidents to expose a covered-up tragedy and demand justice for themselves and other forgotten children.

== Publication ==
Written and illustrated by Mitsunori Zaki, Shōnen no Zankyō started in Kodansha's shōnen manga magazine Monthly Shōnen Sirius on October 26, 2016; following a hiatus that began on September 26, 2017, the manga transferred to the Palcy manga app, where it ran from May 10, 2018, to September 6, 2021, and has also been serialized on Comic Days app from October 9, 2021, to March 19, 2022; and since July 2018 on Pixiv Comics.

Kodansha collected its chapters in four tankōbon volumes, released from May 9, 2017, to July 9, 2019.

=== Volume list ===
No.	Japanese release date	Japanese ISBN
1	May 9, 2017	978-4-06-390705-6
2	May 9, 2018	978-4-06-511478-0
3	December 6, 2018	978-4-06-513918-9
4	July 9, 2019	978-4-06-516551-5
