= Avarth =

Japanese manga series

- First tankōbon volume cover

アヴァルト (Avaruto)
- Genre: Dark fantasy
- Manga
- Written by: Yasunori Mitsunaga
- Published by: Kodansha
- Magazine: Monthly Shōnen Sirius
- Original run: December 26, 2015 – September 26, 2017
- Volumes: 6

Avarth (Japanese: アヴァルト, Hepburn: Avaruto) is a Japanese manga series written and illustrated by Yasunori Mitsunaga. It was serialized in Kodansha's shōnen manga magazine Monthly Shōnen Sirius from December 2015 to September 2017, with its chapters collected in six tankōbon volumes.

== Plot ==
When Earth is invaded by monsters, a giant named Avarth appears, defeats them, and then subjugates humanity, declaring himself a god. A boy, whose mother was killed during the chaos, rises up to lead a rebellion against Avarth.

== Publication ==
Written and illustrated by Yasunori Mitsunaga, Avarth was serialized in Kodansha's shōnen manga magazine Monthly Shōnen Sirius from December 26, 2015, to September 26, 2017. Kodansha collected its chapters in six tankōbon volumes, released from May 9, 2016, to November 9, 2017.

=== Volumes ===
No.	Japanese release date	Japanese ISBN
1	May 9, 2016	978-4-06-390628-8
2	August 9, 2016	978-4-06-390645-5
3	December 9, 2016	978-4-06-390668-4
4	March 9, 2017	978-4-06-390686-8
5	June 9, 2017	978-4-06-390717-9
6	November 9, 2017	978-4-06-510336-4

== See also ==
- Princess Resurrection, another manga series by the same author
- Isekai Sniper wa Onna Senshi no Mofumofu Pet, another manga series by the same author
- Time Stop Hero, another manga series by the same author
