= List of Dragon Eye chapters =

The chapter of Dragon Eye are written and illustrated by Kairi Fujiyama. The manga was serialized in Kodansha's manga magazine, Monthly Shōnen Sirius. Kodansha published the manga's 9 tankōbon between December 22, 2005, and February 22, 2008. The manga is licensed in North America by Del Rey Manga, which released the first volume in June 2007. The eighth volumes has been published with the seventh volume released in March 2009.

== Volume list ==
| No. | Original release date | Original ISBN | English release date | English ISBN |
|---|---|---|---|---|
| 1 | December 22, 2005 | 978-4-06-373003-6 | June 2007 | 978-0-345-49665-2 |
Mission 1: The Man with the Dragon Eye; Mission 2: Squad Zero, Deployed; Mission 3: The Mysterious Wooden Box
| 2 | January 26, 2006 | 978-4-06-373008-1 | September 2007 | 978-0-345-49883-0 |
Mission 4: The Forgotten Promise; Mission 5: The Captain Demoted!?; Mission 6: The Battle on the Lines
| 3 | April 21, 2006 | 978-4-06-373008-1 | December 2007 | 978-0-345-49884-7 |
Mission 7: The Leader of the Rabid; Mission 8: A Stratagem with Low Odds; Mission 9: The Man Once Known as Leda
| 4 | July 21, 2006 | 978-4-06-373008-1 | December 2007 | 978-0-345-49884-7 |
Mission 10: If You Should Ever Recall This Day Someday; Mission 11: Leila's Errand; Mission 12: The Evil Plot in Motion
| 5 | October 23, 2006 | 978-4-06-373043-2 | July 2008 | 978-0-345-50196-7 |
| 6 | February 23, 2007 | 978-4-06-373056-2 | October 2008 | 978-0-345-50521-7 |
| 7 | June 23, 2007 | 978-4-06-373075-3 | March 2009 | 978-0-345-50672-6 |
| 8 | October 23, 2007 | 978-4-06-373090-6 | September 2009 | 978-0-345-50673-3 |
| 9 | February 22, 2008. | 978-4-06-373098-2 | — | — |
