= Denji =

Denji is a Japanese word meaning "electromagnetic". It may refer to:

== People with the given name ==
- Denji Kuroshima (黒島 伝治, 1898–1943), Japanese author

== Fictional characters ==
- Denji (Chainsaw Man), the protagonist of the manga series Chainsaw Man
- Denji Lightan, a character from the anime television series Golden Warrior Gold Lightan
- Kudou Denji, a character from the manga series Abara

== Series ==
- Denshi Sentai Denziman, a part of the Super Sentai franchise
- Denji Sentai Megaranger, a part of the Super Sentai franchise
