= Time Stop Hero =

Japanese manga series

- First tankōbon volume cover, featuring Niña (left) and Kuzuno Sekai (right)

時間停止勇者 (Jikan Teishi Yūsha)
- Genre: Isekai
- Manga
- Written by: Yasunori Mitsunaga
- Published by: Kodansha
- English publisher: NA: Seven Seas Entertainment
- Magazine: Monthly Shōnen Sirius
- Original run: September 26, 2019 – present
- Volumes: 22
- icon

Time Stop Hero (Japanese: 時間停止勇者, Hepburn: Jikan Teishi Yūsha) is a Japanese manga series written and illustrated by Yasunori Mitsunaga. It has been serialized in Kodansha's shōnen manga magazine Monthly Shōnen Sirius since September 2019.

== Plot ==
Kuzuno Sekai is ostracized after an embarrassing photo of him is posted online. Distraught, he wishes he was gone from this world, and finds his wish granted when he abruptly wakes up in a fantasy world with nothing but the clothes on his back and a video game controller. He learns the controller's pause button allows him to freeze time indefinitely until he presses it again. He enthusiastically uses the time freeze for hedonism and perversion, but also to solve problems and defeat opponents, sometimes spending hours or even days in frozen time to find the solution, and often using it to move his allies around and save on travel time. He keeps his time freeze ability secret from all but his closest allies; he pretends he can strip people naked with a spell called "Disarm" and lets people assume that he has super speed or the ability to teleport. He finds a timer in his vision that counts down, though it stops just like everything else when he freezes time. Though unsure of the timer's purpose, he finds that it resets with more time, accompanied by a spontaneous fireworks display and a "Stage Clear!" message, whenever he accomplishes a great heroic deed. After earning the title "Hero of Salvation", he befriends the thief Niña and the dark elf Fury and forms an adventuring party with them. They travel around solving problems and aiming to defeat the King of Darkness, a demon who leads the Forces of Darkness to conquer the world.

== Publication ==
Written and illustrated by Yasunori Mitsunaga, Time Stop Hero started in Kodansha's shōnen manga magazine Monthly Shōnen Sirius on September 26, 2019. Kodansha has collected its chapters into individual tankōbon volumes. The first volume was released on January 9, 2020. As of August 7, 2026, twenty-two volumes have been released.

In North America, the manga has been licensed for English release by Seven Seas Entertainment.

=== Volumes ===
No.	Original release date	Original ISBN	English release date	English ISBN
1	January 9, 2020	978-4-06-518235-2	October 5, 2021	978-1-64827-604-0
1. "Shift and Stop" (シフトアンドストップ, Shifuto ando Sutoppu); 2. "Search and Stop" (検索と停止, Kensaku to Teishi); 3. "Disarm and Stop" (武装解除して停止, Busō Kaijo Shite Teishi); "Swordmaster and Stop" (ソードマスターとストップ, Sōdomasutā to Sutoppu)
Kuzuno Sekai is sent to a fantasy world in the kingdom of Belltree. As his video game controller can freeze time, he uses it for hedonism and perversion, but a timer in his vision counts down from 3 days. He gets arrested on purpose to fight a monster in a gladiator arena, befriending the imprisoned thief Niña. Sekai is smitten with Princess Alicia in the audience. He spends 275 days training in frozen time to gain the strength to kill the monster, a sand worm, inadvertently humiliating Swordmaster Leafa when he strips her while stealing her sword. For his victory, King Woz pardons Sekai and Niña and grants Sekai the title Hero of Salvation. The two learn the controller only works for Sekai. Together, they save Prince Will and his adventuring party from a golem, destroy it, and capture its master, the dark elf Fury. To spare Fury from execution, Sekai purchases her as a slave and then releases her. Princess Clau and her adventuring party challenge Sekai to a fight, but he humiliates them by stripping them naked. Sekai then captures several bandits who had been hunting Fury after destroying her village and killing her sister, allowing Fury to kill them in revenge. Sekai, Niña, and Fury agree to form an adventuring party.
2	May 8, 2020	978-4-06-519437-9	November 9, 2021	978-1-64827-617-0
4. "Goblin and Stop" (ゴブリンとストップ, Goburin to Sutoppu); 5. "Quest and Stop" (クエストとストップ, Kuesuto to Sutoppu); 6. "Bathhouse and Stop" (銭湯と停留所, Sentō to Teiryūjo)
The trio rescues kidnapped girls from being raped by goblins. Cornelius, the father of one of the girls, Fiona, offers them hospitality as thanks. The timer resets to 3 days. While looking for a new job, Sekai humiliates a belligerent man and woman by stripping them naked. Watching this, Leafa deduces Sekai was the one who stripped and stole from her and attacks him, proving fast enough to strike him just as he freezes time. He placates her by begging for mercy. The trio takes a job to investigate a tower and bathhouse where the inhabitants have been turned to stone. After Fury teaches him how, Sekai summons a golem he names Gankichi as an assistant as it can move while time is frozen. They realize the inhabitants were petrified by a cockatrice living in the tower. Sekai attacks it, but is petrified. Fortunately, Gankichi kills it, undoing all the petrification. Sekai then uses his time freeze to ogle all the women in the bathhouse.
3	September 9, 2020	978-4-06-520702-4	January 4, 2022	978-1-64827-640-8
7. "Chaos and Stop" (カオス・アンド・ストップ, Kaosu ando Sutoppu); 8. "Princess and Stop" (プリンセスとストップ, Purinsesu to Sutoppu); 9. "Realm and Stop" (レルムとストップ, Rerumu to Sutoppu); 10. "Orison and Stop" (オリソンとストップ, Orison to Sutoppu)
A shrine that keeps the Forces of Darkness out of Belltree crumbles. The trio rescues Clau and her party from the monster Dark Shoggoth. Fury explains it is a darkling, which is immune to normal attacks but vulnerable to light, holy, and healing magic. Sekai gathers clerics from across the kingdom so they can bombard it with healing spells, allowing Leafa, whom it previously swallowed, to slice her way out and kill it. Clau confesses she has fallen in love with Sekai, but he retreats. The Realm of Darkness encroaches on Belltree, blocking out the sun, then the King of Darkness, a demon the size of a mountain, unleashes a meteor bombardment to avenge Dark Shoggoth before leaving. Sekai uses his time freeze to evacuate everyone in Belltree. The timer resets to 10 days. After saving a child from the darklings and humiliating darkling commander Zaraza by stripping her naked, the trio is informed that Alicia must pray for 100 days to create a holy barrier to repel the darkness. The kingdom of Mount Cape requests help, so they set sail with Leafa joining them.
4	January 8, 2021	978-4-06-522036-8	April 26, 2022	978-1-63858-227-4
11. "Sail and Stop" (セイルアンドストップ, Seiruando Sutoppu); 12. "Ghouls and Stop" (グールとストップ, Gūru to Sutoppu); 13. "Opening and Stop" (開くと停止する, Hiraku to Teishi Suru)
The dragon Bahamut attacks them on their voyage. Learning his controller can control its movements, Sekai defeats it and it agrees to serve him. At Mount Cape, they learn the king is a young boy advised by the witch Lovisa, who explain the city is attacked by monstrous ghouls every night. As Sekai slays the ghouls, Leafa infiltrates the castle to learn her old teacher, Swordmaster Magnus, had been transformed into a monster, only for Lovisa to drop her down a trapdoor into the sewers where the ghouls hide. Sekai saves her and slays all the ghouls, then the group infiltrates the castle. They learn Lovisa is using a portal to the afterlife called the Nether Gate to experiment with resurrecting the dead, but each attempt makes the subject mutate into a monster and spawns ghouls from the Nether Gate. As Leafa battles the monsters, including Magnus, Sekai captures Lovisa and strips her, but finds notes concealed on her body that say they are on the same side.
5	April 8, 2021	978-4-06-522847-0	July 12, 2022	978-1-63858-346-2
14. "Climb and Stop" (登って停止する, Nobotte Teishi Suru); 15. "Unshut and Stop" (アンシャットして停止, Anshatto Shite Teishi); 16. "Mount Cape and Stop" (岬山と停留所, Misakiyama to Teiryūjo)
As Leafa slays the monsters, Lovisa explains she intends to revive her king's father, Tutoom, because he learned a secret to defeating the Forces of Darkness before his death. Her experiments have failed, but the Life Stone on Mount Godfall can perform true resurrections. Leafa leaves to report to the Council of Swordmasters while the trio ride Bahamut to Mount Godfall. Sekai grabs the Life Stone, but is launched off the mountain and breaks his leg. When a mountain tribe that guards the stone threatens him, he defiantly swallows it, healing his injuries. The tribe allows them to leave, but their chieftess Ranga will follow them until he passes the stone out. Meanwhile, an army of ghouls and a massive demon emerge from the Nether Gate. The party arrives back in time to slay them all. The timer resets to 3 days. The Realm of Darkness slowly approaches Mount Cape. As Lovisa needs 3 days to recover enough to perform the ritual, Sekai tries to speed things up by going to 3 witches who can brew a mana restoring potion, but after beating them in a fight in lieu of payment, they do not have any in stock and it takes a while to brew. On the third day, Lovisa attempts the ritual using Sekai's presence for the Life Stone, but it fails because it requires the full moon which is in 24 days, leaving Sekai at his wits' end.
6	August 6, 2021	978-4-06-524402-9	February 21, 2023	978-1-63858-733-0
17. "History and Stop" (履歴と停止, Rireki to Teishi); 18. "Prophecy and Stop" (予言と阻止, Yogen to Soshi); 19. "War and Stop" (戦争と停止, Sensō to Teishi); 20. "Departure and Stop" (出発と停車, Shuppatsu to Teisha)
Sekai does research and learns time beyond the Nether Gate moves slower than in the normal world, so he persuades the others to let him cross it, then open it during the full moon. Ranga follows him and they fend off monsters until the gate reopens. Lovisa performs the ritual, but Tutoom is only resurrected briefly. He says the land of Goido holds the answer. They go there and find a crashed meteorite made of healing stone. They collect it and equip all of Mount Cape's soldiers with weapons enhanced by the stone, allowing them to slay the darklings when they invade. Sekai captures Zaraza and humiliates her, causing the darklings to retreat. When the King of Darkness appears, Niña directs Bahamut to obliterate him with a fireball, but it was just his avatar. With the invasion halted, the timer resets to 10 days. Sekai releases Zaraza, who leaves. After a celebration, a ship bearing the shaman Miria arrives and says her island, Offshore Rope, needs help, so the group agrees to go with her. Before they leave, the witches gift Sekai with the finished mana restoring potion.
7	November 9, 2021	978-4-06-525869-9	June 20, 2023	978-1-63858-969-3
21. "Southbound and Stop" (南行きと停車, Minami-iki to Teisha); 22. "Tropical and Stop" (トロピカルとストップ, Toropikaru to Sutoppu); 23. "Seal and Stop" (シールして止める, Shīru Shite Tomeru)
Sekai gives Miria the potion so she can maintain a holy barrier to protect the ship from the darklings, then passes the time by telling everybody stories from Earth. Meanwhile, as Leafa reports to her superiors, Miria's sister Mirei asks for help and she agrees. As they arrive on the island, Miria explains their elderly king, Nazar, made a law forcing all women to wear only swimsuits in public and made the island a truce zone, allowing darklings as citizens. The new ruler will be decided in a doubles beach volleyball tournament. Two darklings, the Gagankel sisters, Vivia and Gilina, make it clear that if they win, they will order a monolith that is the source of all healing magic destroyed. Leafa and Mirei arrive and meet the others. They learn that every summer solstice, the monolith opens for a week to reveal a labyrinth with a sacred treasure. The summer solstice is today and they go there to find Nazar sent his soldiers to find the treasure as well. Sekai enters with Gankichi to find the labyrinth has rivers of lava.
8	March 9, 2022	978-4-06-527020-2	November 14, 2023	978-1-68579-583-2
24. "Delve and Stop" (探って停止, Sagutte Teishi); 25. "Higan and Stop" (彼岸と止まれ, Higan to Tomare); 26. "Salamander and Stop" (サラマンダーとストップ, Saramandā to Sutoppu)
Sekai and Gankichi navigate the labyrinth to find the treasure guarded by a massive flaming salamander. Unable to defeat it, they enter a tunnel guarded by a centipede monster and arrive in a Japanese village under attack by an army of vampires. He rescues Princess Sayuki Takegawa and everyone who is still alive and stakes the vampires, but she says the only thing that can truly kill them is sunlight, and the sun has not risen in days. He finds an invisible wall around the village and breaks it to return to the island, then enlists his allies' help. Leafa and Ranga lure the salamander into the tunnel to make it fight the centipede. Niña unlocks the treasure to reveal a mirror, but Fury realizes it is fake. Sekai takes all the villagers to the island and seals the breach in the wall to prevent the vampires from following. Miria agrees to take the villagers in as refugees. The timer resets to 3 days.
9	June 9, 2022	978-4-06-528215-1	April 9, 2024	979-8-88843-211-2
27. "Imposter and Stop" (詐欺師と停止, Sagi-shi to Teishi); 28. "Volleyball and Stop" (バレーボールとストップ, Barēbōru to Sutoppu); 29. "Re-search and Stop" (再検索と停止, Sai kensaku to Teishi)
Sayuki's ninja bodyguard Mikage is also her body double, so Sekai persuades her to join the volleyball tournament with Ranga as her partner so that Sayuki can become the new queen and remove the humiliating swimsuit law. During the tournament, Sekai liberally uses his time freeze to cheat or expose other players' cheating. Meanwhile, Leafa returns to the Japanese village to battle the vampires, deducing that the tunnel is a portal to another location and that the village is inside the Realm of Darkness, which is why the sun will not rise. It is a stalemate because the vampires can heal and pull themselves together if sliced apart. In the final match against the Gagankel sisters, Sekai has Miria substitute for Ranga and blast the field with healing magic to weaken the sisters.
10	September 8, 2022	978-4-06-529165-8	September 24, 2024	979-8-88843-861-9
30. "Victory and Stop" (勝利と停止, Shōri to Teishi); 31. "Coronation and Stop" (戴冠と停止, Taikan to Teishi); 32. "Stop and Stop" (ストップアンドストップ, Sutoppuando Sutoppu)
Miria ultimately cannot bring herself to hurt anyone and substitutes Ranga back in, resulting in the Gagankel sisters winning. Leafa returns and everyone realizes Sayuki's hand mirror is the real sacred treasure. They also learn Sayuki is Miria and Mirei's half-sister because their now deceased mother Marina once entered the labyrinth, found the mirror, then entered the Japanese village and married Sayuki's father. At Vivia's coronation ceremony, Sekai shows the mirror to Nazar, revealing he is a shapeshifting slime monster who replaced the real Nazar years ago and works for the Forces of Darkness. Suddenly, a volcano erupts and blocks out the sun with ash, allowing the vampires, who had bitten and turned the salamander and centipede, to invade. Leafa, Ranga, Mikage, Niña, and Bahamut battle them, but Nazar picks Sekai's pocket for his controller and slashes his stomach. Fury forces him to retreat and recovers the controller, then finds the Life Stone fell out of Sekai's wound. She tries to heal him with it, but it does not work. Miria suddenly strips and kisses Sekai on the lips.
11	January 6, 2023	978-4-06-530362-7	December 24, 2024	979-8-88843-980-7
33. "All-Out and Stop" (全力でストップ, Zenryoku de sutoppu); 34. "Wrap-Up-Party and Stop" (打ち上げパーティーと休憩, Uchiage Pātī to Kyūkei); 35. "Elf and Stop" (エルフとストップ, Erufu to Sutoppu)
While defending citizens, Mirei explains Miria sacrificed her own life force to revive Sekai. Sayuki suddenly releases a wave of holy light that disintegrates the vampires and ejects the darklings from the island. The timer resets to 3 days. Ranga inserts the Life Stone into Miria to revive her. Miria had fallen in love with Sekai, but he nervously avoids her. Like Alicia, Sayuki starts praying for 100 days to repel the darkness and everyone agrees to make her the queen. They have a celebration. Before Leafa goes home, she shows Sekai an alternate route in the tunnel and he gives her a healing stone sword as thanks. He finds a forest, a burned down village, and an elf who attacks him on sight. He returns and after saying goodbye to everyone, Niña and Fury agree to go with him to the village, while Ranga will stay on the island because Miria has the Life Stone. Fury recognizes the burnt village as her old home and convinces the elf, her friend Esther, to stand down. Esther still guards the abandoned village because it holds the talking, sacred tree Shinra. Shinra says it was expecting Sekai.
12	April 7, 2023	978-4-06-531343-5	May 27, 2025	979-8-89160-971-6
36. "Tutorial and Stop" (チュートリアルと停止, Chūtoriaru to Teishi); 37. "Past and Stop" (過去と停止, Kako to Teishi); 38. "Council and Stop" (カウンシルとストップ, Kaunshiru to Sutoppu); 39. "Ice Witch and Stop" (氷の魔女とストップ, Kōri no Majo to Sutoppu)
Shinra subjects Sekai to a trial to retrieve a sacred sword from a monster-filled maze, but when he succeeds, he is sent to the past when the village was still thriving. Unfortunately, the elves attack him on sight for being a human and shoot him with arrows. He wakes up back in the present unharmed, but Esther and Fury have no memory of seeing him. Annoyed, he does the trial a second time to return to the past and discovers Fury with her little sister Lucille. Deciding his mission is to prevent Lucille's death, he meets them and gains their trust, learning he is roughly a year in the past. Their aunt reports that Aksho Law, a member of the village's council, which is debating on whether to let outsiders in, was just murdered. While investigating the crime scene, Sekai is shocked to see one of the witches that he got the mana restoring potion from is floating in the sky. He meets the witch, Otomi, and convinces her of his story. To help him get a do-over, she kills him with an ice spell, making him wake up in the present. Again, Fury has no memory of meeting him, but when he declares he will save Aksho and the village, Esther falls in love with him to Fury's jealousy. Sekai does the trial a third time and returns to the past, before Aksho was killed, and observes him. Aksho's throat suddenly gets slashed as if by magic.
13	August 8, 2023	978-4-06-532749-4	October 28, 2025	979-8-89373-369-3
40. "Murderer and Stop" (殺人者と停止, Satsujin-sha to Teishi); 41. "Magicstone and Stop" (魔法石とストップ, Mahō Ishi to Sutoppu); 42. "Fourth and Stop" (4番目とストップ, 4-Banme to Sutoppu); 43. "Timelimit and Stop" (制限時間と停止, Seigen Jikan to Teishi)
Sekai realizes the murderer is a shapeshifting slime creature like Nazar. He enlists Otomi's help and she freezes the creature, then traps it in a jar. It claims the elves must be destroyed in the name of world peace and it arranged for bandits to attack the village if it failed to report. Sekai earns Fury's trust again and brings her to Otomi, whom she identifies as Tomitris Tangelica, an ambassador for the League of Mages. Otomi explains that Shinra's roots are spreading through the land and draining its magic, creating a magic stone shortage outside to replenish the elves' magic stone mines. Fury does not believe her, so Sekai takes her to Shinra and she sees the roots are indeed sucking up magic to produce magic stones. An elf named Discius Orcus oversees the operation to move the magic stones to the mines. Fury asks Sekai to save Aksho, so he has Otomi kill him. He wakes up in the present, then does the trial a fourth time to return to the past. He and Otomi trap the slime creature before it can kill Aksho, then he shows Fury the magic stone conspiracy. She offers a huge magic stone as a peace offering to the League. Sekai captures the bandits and leaves them to be arrested. Sekai and Otomi try to transport the magic stone via her flying broomstick, but Discius knocks them out of the sky with a gravity spell. The magic stone does not fall due to a long-lasting gravity spell. Otomi uses ice to break their fall, then Sekai captures Discius and Fury arrests him. Fury promises to meet him again. Realizing history will not change if he dies, Sekai takes Otomi to the tower and bathhouse with the cockatrice. He lets it petrify him, then Gankichi brings him to Otomi, asking her to guard him until his past self comes to kill the cockatrice. Roughly a year later, the petrification is undone. The timer resets to 3 days. Otomi greets him and shows that the elf village has turned into a floating city, but Discius walks free. He asks her to fly him to the village.
14	December 7, 2023	978-4-06-533880-3	March 24, 2026	979-8-89373-789-9
44. "Air Strike and Stop" (空爆と停止, Kūbaku to Teishi); 45. "Three Witches and Stop" (三人の魔女とストップ, San'nin no Majo to Sutoppu); 46. "Brutism and Stop" (ブルーティズムとストップ, Burūtizumu to Sutoppu); 47. "Airspace and Stop" (空域と停留所, Kūiki to Teiryūjo)
Sekai and Otomi are joined in the sky by her sisters Otaki and Okiku. Discius has been using the floating city, which he renamed Heaven's Wrath, to blast cities with lightning in a bid to take over the world. Heaven's Wrath drifts into the Realm of Darkness and flying darklings led by Zaraza attack it. The witches blast a hole in the force field protecting the city and Sekai, Otomi, Zaraza, and a few darklings slip through before it closes. Sekai frees the elves from dungeon cells and gives his golem summoning stone to Lucille, allowing her to summon a powerful golem to get past Discius' security golems. Discius is protected by a seemingly impenetrable force field that does not give even when Sekai attacks it for hundreds of days in frozen time. Discius claims Lucille and Fury are the last descendants of the Celestials and asks her to join him, but she refuses. The group leaves him and Sekai asks Zaraza for an alliance to take Discius down. She refuses and tries to attack Otomi because she and her sisters experimented on and killed darklings to acquire eternal youth. Sekai moves his group to Shinra where they find that Fury and several other elves have been turned into wooden statues and are being drained of magic to power the city. Discius makes the city rise above the clouds to expose the darklings to sunlight and make them vulnerable. Suddenly, an airship that dwarfs the city appears and vaporizes Discius with an energy cannon, then continually blasts the city and punches holes in it. Unable to evacuate the elves, Sekai contemplates killing himself to reset the timeline, but Lucille starts praying and releases a wave of holy light that launches the darklings out of the city. The airship is still blasting, but Sekai gets an idea on how to fix this.
15	April 9, 2024	978-4-06-535096-6	September 15, 2026	979-8-89561-417-4
48. "Shinra and Stop" (シンラとストップ, Shinra to Sutoppu); 49. "Revival and Stop" (復活と停止, Fukkatsu to Teishi); 50. "One Year and Stop" (1年と停止, 1-Nen to Teishi); 51. "White Knight and Stop" (ホワイトナイトとストップ, Howaito Naito to Sutoppu)
Sekai does Shinra's test a fifth time to return to the past, but Otomi goes with him. Together with Otomi's past self, they save Aksho and expose Discius' crimes in public, ensuring he remains arrested. Sekai instructs Aksho to alter Fury, Esther, and the bandits' memories to make them think the village was destroyed, burn the village, then have the villagers hide for a year, ensuring that history does not change. In the present, Fury, Esther, and Niña are stunned when the villagers come out of hiding and Fury reunites with Lucille. Otomi's past self, who stayed with the villagers, explains that Sekai and her future self delivered a huge magic stone to the League of Mages, but they never returned. A flashback shows the two successfully delivered the stone and the timer reset to 3 days. When the League's 4 meter tall leader, Veradonna Wizardonia, learned of Sekai's ability to freeze time, she cast her own time magic to slow him down into a statue and had him imprisoned, declaring only she is allowed to control time. Otomi protested, but Veradonna and her followers threatened her, so she sadly went home. Fury and Niña go to Belltree to ask for help. Princess Clau and her party agree to help, except for her mage Gerda who refuses to oppose the League, so they sail to Mount Cape to ask Lovisa to open a portal for them. Lovisa's portal takes them a day away from the League's headquarters and they must immediately fight off monsters. Veradonna and her followers detect the portal and ask who would dare challenge the League.
16	August 7, 2024	978-4-06-536588-5	March 16, 2027	979-8-89561-418-1
52. "Rescue and Stop" (救出と停止, Kyūshutsu to Teishi); 53. "Big Witch and Stop" (大きな魔女とストップ, Ōkina Majo to Sutoppu); 54. "Guidance and Stop" (誘導と停止, Yūdō to Teishi); 55. "Myth and Stop" (神話と停止, Shinwa to Teishi)
The party receives an audience with Veradonna, who denies knowing Sekai. Knowing she is lying, Niña and Clau's archer, Callie, work together to infiltrate her castle and free Sekai, breaking the time freeze put on him. He decides to get revenge by stripping and humiliating Veradonna and her followers, but her normal sized twin daughters, Sarida and Dahlia, freeze him. They want to kill him, but Veradonna realizes he could have easily killed them and decides to imprison him again. Niña and Callie rescue him again, and on him is a note inviting him and Clau to a discussion. The rest the party has to wait outside, but Bahamut is ready to attack if anything happens to them. Acknowledging Sekai as the Hero of Time, Veradonna offers to show them a secret not known to the rest of the League. She leads them through a giant-scaled, booby-trapped, and monster-filled labyrinth to a casket with a giant corpse inside. She explains it is Isawera, the Goddess of Life. Long ago, Lumille, the Goddess of Light, and Neibus, the Goddess of Darkness, were at war until Lumille was slain. Lumille's corpse split into Isawera, Haineus, the Goddess of the Sky, Fimis, the Goddess of Fire, Shintas, the Goddess of Water, Entoura, the Goddess of Earth, Vitilia, the Goddess of Thunder, and Searos, the Goddess of Ice. The seven goddesses together were able to repel Neibus and the Realm of Darkness. When Isawera mysteriously died, this allowed the Forces of Darkness to invade, so Veradonna has been trying to revive her. Sarida followed them and explains that Dahlia fell into a hole and disappeared. Veradonna writes her off as dead since the lower floor nullifies magic, but Sekai and Clau volunteer to find her and Veradonna arms Sekai with a sacred heirloom sword. Knowing her mother will not approve, Sarida freezes Veradonna and asks to come with them.
17	December 9, 2024	978-4-06-537702-4	—	—
56. "Labyrinth and Stop" (迷宮と停止, Meikyū to Teishi); 57. "Boss Fight and Stop" (ボス戦と停止, Bosu-sen to Teishi); 58. "Gatekeeper and Stop" (ゲートキーパーとストップ, Gēto Kīpā to Sutoppu); 59. "Siege and Stop" (包囲と阻止, Hōi to Soshi)
While the lower floor, which is another monster-filled labyrinth, nullifies spells, Sekai's time freeze still works and he learns that spells performed in the upper floor, like summoning Gankichi, can linger. Sarida navigates since she can sense Dahlia's presence. They reach a door guarded by a giant suit of animated armor. Sekai breaks a hole in the ceiling and carries the girls up, allowing Clau to blast the armor with lightning until it falls apart. A gaseous monster emerges, but Sekai kills it with the sacred sword, amazing Sarida who says only a worthy hero can wield it. The door opens and they step through, but Dahlia suddenly tackles Sarida back inside and the door closes, trapping Sekai and Clau. The door and the surrounding rock is seemingly indestructible, so they explore a forest where everything is so huge they are the same size as the mice. They find a monolith with another giant corpse inside, which is on a cliff floating in a void. When Sarida and Dahlia reunite with their mother, the timer resets to 3 days. With no other options, Sekai and Clau make camp and hope their friends find them. Veradonna, Sarida, and Dahlia explain what happened to the party. The armor reassembled itself, so they feel it is impossible to retrieve Sekai and Clau, but the party refuses to abandon them. Suddenly, the Forces of Darkness invade. As Veradonna organizes a defense, Niña asks to send a message requesting help from Leafa, who is currently battling the Forces of Darkness elsewhere.
18	April 9, 2025	978-4-06-539068-9	—	—
60. "Two Swords and Stop" (二本の剣とストップ, Nihon'notsurugi to Sutoppu); 61. "Sunlight and Stop" (太陽光と停止, Taiyōkō to Teishi); 62. "Home Run and Stop" (ホームランとストップ, Hōmuran to Sutoppu); 63. "Coexist and Stop" (共存と停止, Kyōzon to Teishi)
Veradonna opens a portal to Lovisa, who in turn opens one to Leafa, who agrees to help. Dahlia leads Leafa through the labyrinth and she defeats the armor and gaseous monster, making the door open. Sekai and Clau step through, but Sekai has Gankichi jam the closing door with its body. The darklings are led by Virian, a former member of the League of Mages. The mages create a miniature sun and threaten to drop it on the darklings, but they are holding villagers hostage. Sekai uses his time freeze to free the villagers and return them home, then tries to persuade Virian and the darklings to leave. Veradonna orders the mini-sun dropped, uncaring of the danger to Sekai, but he moves all the darklings away from the impact zone, declaring no one will die on his watch. Everyone except for Niña, Fury, Clau, and Leafa declares him a traitor to humanity. Veradonna orders another mini-sun dropped, but Leafa knocks it away with her sword. Virian claims that she used to be human, but after being expelled from the League for worshiping Neibus, she was driven to join the Forces of Darkness and become a darkling. Sekai and Leafa convince her to take the darklings and leave, but the avatar of the King of Darkness appears and mind controls her into ordering the darklings to attack. The mages make a third mini-sun, but it is too weak since their mana is depleted. Sekai has Bahamut obliterate the avatar with a fireball, making the timer reset. Leafa goes home. All the darklings disappear, and everyone is convinced that Sekai is not a traitor. However, Sekai tells Niña that the darklings are all alive.
19	August 7, 2025	978-4-06-540288-7	—	—
64. "Teardrop and Stop" (ティアドロップとストップ, Tiadoroppu to Sutoppu); 65. "Grass Pier and Stop" (グラスピアとストップ, Gurasupia to Sutoppu); 66. "Heavy Machinery and Stop" (重機と停止, Jūki to Teishi); 67. "Rocks and Stop" (ロックとストップ, Rokku to Sutoppu)
Veradonna pledges the League's support to Sekai. He leads her and her daughters to the giant corpse beyond the door and Veradonna identifies it as Neibus. Sekai says this means Neibus is not controlling the Forces of Darkness, so if the King of Darkness is defeated, there is a chance to establish peace. After a celebration, Veradonna confides to Sekai that Virian was her best friend, but she regretfully exiled her due to her unethical experiments with dark magic. Sekai tells her that he used his time freeze to evacuate Virian and the darklings before the fireball hit and then they left, making her cry in relief. Clau's party goes home, then Sekai's party meets the future Otomi and convinces her to join them. Otomi wants to go to the healing hot springs of the town Grass Pier in the dwarf kingdom of Cloud Horse. Upon arrival via a portal, some dwarves are hostile to Fury for being an elf, but Prince Balgrim orders them shown hospitality because Otomi had saved their people many times in the past. As the girls soak in the hot spring and Sekai uses his time freeze to ogle them, Fury explains the elves vs dwarves feud started when a dwarf king jacked up the prices of magic stones to pay for a war against the trolls, making the elves feel cheated. Later, the party is invited to tour the mines and the palace which are both inside Mount Ougi. There are ancient ruins in there too and the dwarves have uncovered mech suits. There is a cave-in and Balgrim's little sister Princess Darocca is buried. Sekai quickly digs her out and takes her to a cleric to be healed. Balgrim is appalled when Darocca is ungrateful. Sekai noticed she was trying to open a vault in the ruins when the cave-in happened and offers the thief Niña's services in unlocking it, but she is still ungrateful.
20	December 9, 2025	978-4-06-542069-0	—	—
68. "Locking and Stop" (ロックして停止する, Rokku Shite Teishi Suru); 69. "Troll and Stop" (トロール&ストップ, Torōru ando Sutoppu); 70. "Charge and Stop" (充電と停止, Jūden to Teishi); 71. "Mt. Ougi and Stop" (扇山と停止, Ōgiyama to Teishi)
The vault has no keyhole, but it responds to Fury and a keyhole appears, which they suspect is because of her Celestial heritage. While Niña and Darocca work on it, the party feasts with Balgrim and his wife Elva. Unfortunately, a racist dwarf elder named Sloven constantly insults Fury and claims the elves were the ones who cheated the dwarves. Niña and Darocca open the vault, which leads to a tunnel. Sekai scouts ahead and discovers stairs leading up, trolls tunneling through the rock, and a room where a spider-like robot guarding a door has killed several trolls with a laser beam. He uses his sword to reflect the laser, but it barely does any damage, so he retreats. Otomi convinces Balgrim not to risk himself and the party advances with Darocca in a mech suit. A troll blocks their path until Darocca makes him submit in a duel. Sekai meets them and warns about the robot. Another troll named Lugad asks to join them as he wants the robot destroyed for killing his friends and to learn what is beyond the door. Darocca arrogantly tries to fight the robot alone and is knocked out. After reviving her, Sekai convinces her to work together, so he continuously reflects the laser until she can smash it apart. The timer resets to three days and the door opens. The mountain mysteriously briefly releases a pillar of light into the sky. Zaraza and her forces spot this and move towards it. Sekai scouts ahead and discovers stairs leading to what looks like an observatory on the summit. He finds a mural depicting the airship that nearly destroyed the elf village and spots Zaraza's forces on the horizon, leaving him wondering what to do.
21	April 9, 2026	978-4-06-543120-7	—	—
72. "Mountain Top and Stop" (山頂と停留所, Sanchō to Teiryūjo); 73. "Ascendant and Stop" (アセンダントとストップ, Asendanto to Sutoppu); 74. "Hemisphere and Stop" (半球とストップ, Hankyū to Sutoppu); 75. "Black Rabbit and Stop" (黒ウサギとストップ, Kuro Usagi to Sutoppu)
22	August 7, 2026	978-4-06-544442-9	—	—
76. "Maelstrom and Stop" (メイルストロームとストップ, Meirusutorōmu to Sutoppu); 77. "Hymenus and Stop" (ヒメヌスとストップ, Himenusu to Sutoppu); 78. "Jelly and Stop" (ゼリーとストップ, Zerī to Sutoppu); 79. "Bitter Enemies and Stop" (宿敵と停止, Shukuteki to Teishi)

=== Chapters not yet in tankōbon format ===
80. "Paganism and Stop" (異教と停止, Ikyō to Teishi)
81. "Phimis and Stop" (フィミス・アンド・ストップ, Fimisu Ando Sutoppu)
82. "Collapse and Stop" (崩壊と停止, Hōkai to Teishi)
83. "Tug of War and Stop" (綱引きと停止, Tsunahiki to Teishi)

== See also ==
- Princess Resurrection, another manga series by the same author
- Avarth, another manga series by the same author
- Isekai Sniper wa Onna Senshi no Mofumofu Pet, another manga series by the same author
