= Wolverine: Snikt! =

Marvel Comics limited series

Publication information
- Publisher: Marvel Comics
- Schedule: Monthly
- Format: Limited series
- Genre: Superhero
- Publication date: July – November 2003
- No. of issues: 5
- Main character: Wolverine

Wolverine: Snikt! is a five-issue comic book limited series written and illustrated by Tsutomu Nihei, published by Marvel Comics in 2003 as part of their short-lived Tsunami imprint and starring Wolverine.

The title refers to the onomatopoeic representation of the sound of Wolverine's claws being extended — a metallic noise often written as "snikt".

== Plot synopsis ==
Wolverine walks through New York City's Central Park when a girl named Fusa tells him that her people are being massacred. She transports Wolverine to the year 2058, where human beings have all but been rendered extinct by new creatures called Mandates. Fusa asks Wolverine to fight against the Mandates, who are creating programs to process metals, all except adamantium, the metal that coats Wolverine's bones and claws. Wolverine accepts and goes on a mission to the Mandate colony, where the Progenitor (the first and the only Mandate capable of replication) is located. During the mission, Wolverine's team is killed, leaving only Wolverine and The Colonel (an adamantium cyborg). The Colonel makes it easier for Wolverine to reach The Progenitor's weakness: its Orb Core. Once there, Wolverine destroys the Orb Core, causing all the other mandates to be destroyed. In the end, Fusa asks Wolverine to stay in the future, but Wolverine tells her that he belongs to another place and hopes not to see them again (speaking in a positive manner). Fusa then transports Wolverine to the past, where he quotes Jim Morrison: "The future is uncertain and the end is always near".

== Collected editions ==
The series was collected in the trade paperback as Wolverine Legends Volume 5 in January 2004. Viz Media relicensed the series and released it as a deluxe edition in June 2023.

== Reception ==
Polygon's Zachary Jenkins included Wolverine: Snikt! in a list of "The 10 greatest Wolverine comics of all time", calling it "a singular work from Nihei and the kind of unique book more comics should strive to be".
