= Tower Dungeon =

Japanese manga series by Tsutomu Nihei

- First tankōbon volume cover, featuring Yuva

タワーダンジョン (Tawā Danjon)
- Genre: Dark fantasy
- Manga
- Written by: Tsutomu Nihei
- Published by: Kodansha
- English publisher: NA: Kodansha USA
- Imprint: Sirius KC
- Magazine: Monthly Shōnen Sirius
- Original run: October 26, 2023 – present
- Volumes: 7
- icon

Tower Dungeon (Japanese: タワーダンジョン, Hepburn: Tawā Danjon) is a Japanese manga series written and illustrated by Tsutomu Nihei. It has been serialized in Kodansha's shōnen manga magazine Monthly Shōnen Sirius since October 2023. It is about a farmer who is drafted into a group of soldiers tasked to rescue a princess from a massive tower filled with monsters and traps.

== Plot ==
A necromancer seizes control after assassinating the king, imprisoning the princess in a monolithic tower. When the Royal Guard's assault fails, they conscript villagers like Yuva, a strong but inexperienced farmhand. The tower's nightmarish interior contains twisted architecture and mutated creatures, including reanimated fallen soldiers. As the group ascends, they face increasingly grotesque horrors while struggling with dwindling resources. Yuva's raw resilience proves vital against the tower's impossible geometry and supernatural threats, contrasting with the guards' formal training in this grim struggle for survival.

== Media ==
=== Manga ===
Written and illustrated by Tsutomu Nihei, Tower Dungeon started in Kodansha's shōnen manga magazine Monthly Shōnen Sirius on October 26, 2023. Kodansha has collected its chapters into individual tankōbon volumes, with the first one released on February 8, 2024. As of September 9, 2026, seven volumes have been released.

In July 2024, Kodansha USA announced that it had licensed the manga for English release in North America, with the first volume released on July 15, 2025.

==== Volumes ====
No.	Original release date	Original ISBN	English release date	English ISBN
1	February 8, 2024	978-4-06-534697-6	July 15, 2025	978-1-64-729454-0
2	May 9, 2024	978-4-06-535644-9	September 16, 2025	978-1-64-729469-4
3	October 8, 2024	978-4-06-536991-3	November 11, 2025	978-1-64-729470-0
4	March 7, 2025	978-4-06-538735-1	February 3, 2026	978-1-64-729599-8
5	September 9, 2025	978-4-06-540641-0	May 5, 2026	978-1-64-729600-1
6	March 9, 2026	978-4-06-542766-8	November 24, 2026	978-1-64-729648-3
7	September 9, 2026	978-4-06-544783-3	March 23, 2027	978-1-64-729709-1

=== Other media ===
A promotional video for the release of the manga's sixth volume was published by Monthly Shōnen Sirius on its YouTube channel on March 30, 2026. The video features manga art with special effects by the agency Maxilla and traditional animation by the studio Keel. Toshiyuki Kono directed the animated clips at Keel and drew the storyboards, while Asuka Suzuki designed the characters and Tetsurō Moronuki designed the creatures.

== Reception ==
By August 2026, the manga had over a million copies in circulation.

The manga was nominated for the tenth Next Manga Award in the print category in 2024. It was also nominated in the Daruma for Best Drawing and Action Manga categories at the Japan Expo Awards in 2026.

Kara Dennison of Otaku USA observed that Tower Dungeon represents Nihei's shift from sci-fi to dark fantasy. She observed that the series features Nihei's distinctive monster designs and hints at deeper political intrigue. While the first volume mainly sets up the story, Dennison suggested it could appeal to both existing fans and new readers as a promising fantasy entry. Reviewing the first volume, Kevin Cormack of Anime News Network noted that the series marks Nihei's venture into fantasy, contrasting his signature sci-fi works like Blame!, and observed that the manga retains Nihei's atmospheric worldbuilding while featuring simplified character designs and organic architecture. While praising the RPG-inspired premise and environmental storytelling, Cormack found the 160-page volume disappointingly short, ending as the narrative developed.
