= Isekai Sniper wa Onna Senshi no Mofumofu Pet =

Japanese manga series

- First tankōbon volume cover, featuring Raisa (left) and Mofuo (right)

異世界狙撃手(スナイパー)は女戦士のモフモフ愛玩動物(ペット) (Isekai Sunaipā wa Onna Senshi no Mofumofu Petto)
- Genre: Isekai
- Manga
- Written by: Yasunori Mitsunaga
- Illustrated by: Inomaru
- Published by: Shōnen Gahōsha
- Imprint: Young King Comics
- Magazine: Young King Ours GH (November 15, 2019 – November 17, 2025); Comic Y-OURs (January 13, 2026 – present)
- Original run: November 15, 2019 – present
- Volumes: 12
- icon

Isekai Sniper wa Onna Senshi no Mofumofu Pet (Japanese: 異世界狙撃手(スナイパー)は女戦士のモフモフ愛玩動物(ペット), Hepburn: Isekai Sunaipā wa Onna Senshi no Mofumofu Petto; 'The Sniper from Another World Is a Female Warrior's Fluffy Pet') is a Japanese manga series written by Yasunori Mitsunaga and illustrated by Inomaru. It was serialized in Shōnen Gahōsha's monthly seinen manga magazine Young King Ours GH from November 2019 to November 2025, and later transferred to the publisher's Comic Y-OURs website in January 2026.

== Plot ==
Mr. Yasao, a 31-year-old firearms enthusiast marginalized socially due to his unemployment and cohabitation with his parents, dies in an accidental firearm discharge involving a homemade weapon. In the afterlife, a mysterious deity grants him reincarnation into a fantasy world as a sentient, teddy bear-like creature named Mofuo. After facing initial survival struggles, he is adopted by a swordswoman named Raisa, who discovers his linguistic capabilities.

Mofuo's unique ability manifests as the conjuration of firearms through excavation—an anomalous phenomenon in this world where such weapons are virtually unknown; he speculates about their prior existence in antiquity. His ballistic expertise, which includes quick draw, sharpshooting, and sniping, proves tactically valuable, facilitating their alliance with martial artist Erika Hardlock after becoming involved in her familial vendetta.

The group undertakes various quests during which Mofuo domesticates a canine-like reptilian companion. He often enjoys seeing girls naked, such as during bath time, and receives no punishment for it because he is not human.

== Publication ==
Written by Yasunori Mitsunaga and illustrated by Inomaru, Isekai Sniper wa Onna Senshi no Mofumofu Pet started in Shōnen Gahōsha's seinen manga magazine Young King Ours GH on November 15, 2019. The magazine ceased publication on November 17, 2025, and the series resumed on the publisher's Comic Y-OURs website on January 13, 2026. Shōnen Gahōsha has collected its chapters into individual tankōbon volumes. The first volume was released on May 29, 2020. As of October 16, 2026, twelve volumes have been released.

=== Volumes ===
No.	Japanese release date	Japanese ISBN
1	May 29, 2020	978-4-7859-6682-9
1. "Encounter with Raisa the Female Warrior!" (女戦士ライサとの遭遇!, On'na senshi Raisa to no Sōgū!); 2. "Bloody Battle Guild Bar" (ブラッディバトルギルドバー, Buraddi Batoru Girudo Bā); 3. "Break in! Bounty Hunter Erika (Part 1)" (押し入る！賞金稼ぎエリカ(前編), Oshiiru! Shōkin Kasegi Erika (Zenpen)); 4. "Break in! Bounty Hunter Erika (Part 2)" (押し入る！賞金稼ぎエリカ(後編), Oshiiru! Shōkin Kasegi Erika (Kōhen)); 5. "Break in! Bounty Hunter Erika (Part 3)" (押し入る！賞金稼ぎエリカ(パート3), Oshiiru! Shōkin Kasegi Erika (Pāto 3))
The gun collector, Mr. Yasao, is killed when a gun explodes in his face. In a twist of fate, a mysterious god reincarnates him as a teddy bear-like creature in a fantasy world. The swordswoman Raisa adopts him as a pet and names him Mofuo; he enjoys her innocent habit of often getting naked around him. Orcs attack the town with the intent to abduct and rape the women, prompting Raisa to fight them off. Mofuo discovers his ability to summon guns and kills the orcs. Raisa attempts to sell the orc corpses but struggles with unpopularity due to a scar on her back that allegedly marks her as a deserter. When some men attack her, Mofuo shoots them in the groin and then pledges himself as Raisa's partner. The fistfighter, Erika Hardlock, hires Raisa and Mofuo to help capture the crime lord Don Cordero, who murdered Erika's sister. The girls infiltrate his compound disguised as prostitutes while Mofuo prepares his sniper rifle outside. Cordero's men use aphrodisiac perfume to compel the girls to strip and dance for them. Cordero is ultimately revealed to be a gigantic, hideous monster who regularly devours women. He swallows Raisa and pursues Erika outside. Mofuo snipes Cordero and his men, weakening him enough for Raisa to break free from his stomach, allowing the girls to ultimately kill him. After selling his body parts, they decide to form a team.
2	November 16, 2020	978-4-7859-6795-6
6. "Dishonored! Packed Molester Carriage (Part 1)" (不名誉だ！満員痴漢馬車(前編), Fumeiyoda! Man'in Chikan Basha (Zenpen)); 7. "Dishonored! Packed Molester Carriage (Part 2)" (不名誉だ！満員痴漢馬車(後編), Fumeiyoda! Man'in Chikan Basha (Kōhen)); 8. "Strange! Mysterious Disappearances (Part 1)" (変！謎の失踪事件(前編), Hen! Nazo no Shissō Jiken (Zenpen)); 9. "Strange! Mysterious Disappearances (Part 2)" (変！謎の失踪事件(パート２), Hen! Nazo no Shissō Jiken (Pāto 2)); 10. "Strange! Mysterious Disappearances (Part 3)" (変！謎の失踪事件(パート３), Hen! Nazo no Shissō Jiken (Pāto 3))
Raisa's sword cannot be repaired, so they go to the capital, Central City, for a better one. Along the way, they take a job to investigate a train where the female passengers constantly get stripped and molested as if by magic. The girls quickly fall victim to this, while with his superior vision, Mofuo sees tiny pixies are moving super fast to steal from the women, then deliver the clothes and valuables to thieves riding outside. Mofuo kills them all, then the team recovers the stolen items and are rewarded. In Central City, all the shops are closed and the guards confiscate Mofuo and tell the girls they can never leave. The guild master says women in this city have been disappearing. Mofuo kills his corrupt jailers and tames a dog-sized lizard monster before escaping and regrouping with Raisa, but Erika is missing. They use the lizard to track her scent into underground tunnels, where they find giant ants are cocooning girls as food for their young. They rescue the ones who are still alive, including Erika, and take them to the surface, but the girls say the princess is still a captive. The team finds the princess tied up by men who are controlling the ants by torturing the queen to produce eggs. They attack and kill the men, though some escape. Out of gratitude for being freed, the ants leave them alone and move away from the city. Later, the king rewards them for saving the girls and his daughter, but they are annoyed when the princess wants to keep Mofuo as her pet.
3	May 17, 2021	978-4-7859-6915-8
11. "Rescue! Mithril Blacksmith (Part 1)" (救援！ミスリル鍛冶屋(前編), Kyūen! Misuriru Kajiya (Zenpen)); 12. "Rescue! Mithril Blacksmith (Part 2)" (救援！ミスリル鍛冶屋(後編), Kyūen! Misuriru Kajiya (Kōhen)); 13. "Rescue! Mithril Blacksmith (Part 3)" (救援！ミスリル鍛冶屋(その3), Kyūen! Misuriru Kajiya (Sono 3)); 14. "Rescue! Mithril Blacksmith (Final Part)" (救援！ミスリルの鍛冶屋(最終回), Kyūen! Misuriru no Kajiya (Saishūkai)); 15. "Breeder Hunt (Part 1)" (ブリーダーハント (パート 1), Burīdāhanto (Pāto 1))
They refuse the princess and want a mithril sword for Raisa, but the king says the only mithril blacksmith went missing on a trip to a mountain famous for both mithril and truffles, as had many who visited the mountain. The team goes to the mountain, but mushroom monsters knock them out with hallucinogenic spores. Mofuo and the lizard wake up and escape, but the mushrooms collect Raisa and Erika's vaginal fluids as they experience erotic nightmares. Mofuo prepares to attack, but the mushroom's leader drinks the fluids and grows into a giant. The mushrooms want to reclaim their territory from trolls as the leader battles the trolls' gigantic leader. The girls wake up and the situation is explained; they call on both sides to make peace. The trolls were forced to conquer the mountain by a giant centipede that demands tributes of mithril and truffles. The centipede, made of the flesh of assimilated humans, attacks them and absorbs Raisa and Erika. Mofuo destroys a tiny centipede controlling the creature, making it revert to living humans. Happy to be free, the trolls and mushrooms give them truffles and mythril. A girl among the freed humans, with a voice so soft that only Mofuo can hear her, is Mia, the mithril blacksmith, who uses alchemy to process mithril. She agrees to forge a mithril sword for Raisa, but it will take a week. The team returns to the palace and bathes with the princess and her handmaidens, but suffer a mishap when cleaner eels are released into the water. The king hires the team to capture the leader of the men behind the giant ants, nicknamed the Breeder. The team splits up. Mofuo and the lizard meet Brenda Aubel, a female knight. After a brief misunderstanding and fight that Mofuo wins, they go to a tavern where she says that she is chasing the Breeder who kidnapped her country's princess, Esmeralda Krone. The lizard detects Brenda's drink is drugged and spills it in time, so they realize the Breeder is close. In another tavern, Raisa and Erika are drugged and made to strip and masturbate for a crowd before being taken away. After tracking the Breeder's scent through the woods for a while, Mofuo, the lizard, and Brenda make camp, but Brenda impatiently keeps moving while the other two sleep.
4	January 17, 2022	978-4-7859-7066-6
16. "Breeder Hunt (Part 2)" (ブリーダーハント（パート2), Burīdāhanto (Pāto 2)); 17. "Breeder Hunt (Part 3)" (ブリーダーハント（パート3), Burīdāhanto (Pāto 3)); 18. "Breeder Hunt (Part 4)" (ブリーダーハント（パート4), Burīdāhanto (Pāto 4)); 19. "Breeder Hunt (Part 5)" (ブリーダーハント (パート5), Burīdāhanto (Pāto 5); 20. "Breeder Hunt (Part 6)" (ブリーダーハント (パート6), Burīdāhanto (Pāto 6); 21. "The Princess's Transformation (Part 1)" (王女の変貌（パート1), Ōjo no henbō (Pāto 1))
In the next town, Mofuo and the lizard find Brenda forced to fight as a gladiator against a giant monster. The pig-like master, Harihoril, says he will release the princess if she wins. She kills it, but giant parasites emerge from its corpse and attack as Harihoril says he never had any intention of honoring their deal. Mofuo shoots the parasites and they run with Mofuo releasing other monsters from their cages to slow down the guards. They find the room where the princess is being held. As they fight past the guards, Raisa and Erika perform for and are molested by a crowd. As Brenda and the princess escape in a cart, Harihoril unleashes another monster to chase them, but Mofuo kills it with a rocket launcher, then parts ways with them. Raisa and Erika are forced into a wrestling match with the snail woman Maimai Maimy. They are hindered by the drugs still in their systems, allowing Maimai to overpower and molest them. Mofuo arrives and shoots Maimai's shell, cracking it and making her run away. The crowd storms the ring intending to rape them, but Mofuo shoots a few and makes them run away. Neril Claw, the owner tries to stop them with an anti-magic spell, but Mofuo shoots him mid-rant. Later, Brenda returns and asks for help, so they ride to her city of Westia. The princess offers them hospitality, but keeps stripping naked and complaining it is too hot as if she was in a trance. Brenda suspects Horihoril did something to the princess and they suspect the Breeder is involved. The next day, Raisa and Erika also strip naked and say it is too hot. Brenda reports that all women in the city are in the same trance. The women all march naked into a public fountain. Brenda suddenly goes into the trance and strips as well.
5	August 30, 2022	978-4-7859-7218-9
22. "The Princess's Transformation (Part 2)" (王女の変貌（パート2), Ōjo no henbō (Pāto 2)); 23. "The Princess's Transformation (Part 3)" (王女の変貌（パート3), Ōjo no henbō (Pāto 3)); 24. "The Princess's Transformation (Part 4)" (王女の変貌（パート4), Ōjo no henbō (Pāto 4)); 25. "The Princess's Transformation (Part 5)" (王女の変貌（パート5), Ōjo no henbō (Pāto 5)); 26. "The Princess's Transformation (Part 6)" (王女の変貌（パート6), Ōjo no henbō (Pāto 6)); 27. "The Princess's Transformation (Part 7)" (王女の変貌（パート7), Ōjo no henbō (Pāto 7))
A tentacled monster that emits freezing cold emerges and the entranced women flock to it. Mofou and the men of Westia try to attack it, but the women shield it with their bodies to force them to stop. Princess Krone surrenders her nation to the monster. The men give in and they and the monster start raping the women. Mofou snaps Raisa, Erika, and Brenda out of it by spraying them with urine and they escape. The Breeder's men, who control the monster, take over Westia. The group enlists the aid of a retired hero, the ageless elf Fine. Fine seduces all the city guards and has sex with them until they pass out. The group infiltrates the castle by Mofou pretending to be one of the Breeder's men and the girls pretending to be enthralled. Fine seduces the Breeder's men and her disguise slips, so the group realizes she is actually a succubus. They reach the monster who is having an orgy with Krone and the others. Fine explains it releases pheromones into the water that controls women. She reveals that 40 years ago, she rebelled against the demons and was exiled. She fell in love with Krone's father and joined his party, but when they faced the monster, she lost control and caused destruction, leading her to be ousted. She aimed to atone by building up her strength and doing research until she could defeat the monster. Her research shows the monster is poisoned by semen, so she plans to have sex with it and release the semen stored in her body. The monster suddenly releases more pheromones that enthrall the girls, but Mofou sprays them with urine-filled water guns to snap them out of it. Fine tells them to free the others while she enacts her plan.
6	April 4, 2023	978-4-7859-7354-4
28. "The Princess's Transformation (Part 8)" (王女の変貌（パート8), Ōjo no henbō (Pāto 8)); 29. "The Princess's Transformation (Part 9)" (王女の変貌（パート9), Ōjo no henbō (Pāto 9)); 30. "The Princess's Transformation (Part 10)" (王女の変貌（パート10), Ōjo no henbō (Pāto 10)); 31. "The Princess's Transformation (Part 11)" (王女の変貌（パート11), Ōjo no henbō (Pāto 11)); 32. "The Deep Mountain Mansion (Part 1)" (深山の屋敷（パート1), Miyama no Yashiki (Pāto 1)); 33. "The Deep Mountain Mansion (Part 2)" (深山の屋敷（パート2), Miyama no Yashiki (Pāto 2))
Mofou frees all the women except Princess Krone who was grabbed by the monster. Fine lets it grab her and releases the semen in her body, but this only stuns it briefly. As it grabs Brenda, Mofou blasts it with a rocket launcher, but it regenerates. Fine transforms into a giant demonic form to battle the monster, tearing the castle apart and nearly killing people with debris. They free Brenda, but Raisa gets grabbed and the monster starts to escape. Mofou prays for power, then inadvertently summons a satellite weapon that blasts the monster with a railgun, finally killing it while Fine catches Raisa and Krone before returning to normal. Krone's father the King, who was captured by the Breeder's men, has the men arrested. In the bath, Fine has Mofou help her inspect all the women's wombs for eggs from the monster. They find a few and destroy them. Mofou, Raisa, and Erika are rewarded with gold while Fine returns to her mountain hideout. While walking home, they rescue a catgirl maid from being raped by orcs, so she invites them to her mansion, where Lady Carumba Lizel receives them. That night, Mofou finds Carumba leading Raisa and Erika, who are in trances, naked on leashes and confronts her, but she opens a third eye and hypnotizes him before having the maid leash him as a pet. Deep in the mansion is a slave auction and Brenda has been captured and hypnotized. Leng, who wants revenge for Brenda previously raiding his brothel of slave girls, wins her at the auction. Carumba leads Raisa and Erika in.
7	October 16, 2023	978-4-7859-7505-0
34. "The Deep Mountain Mansion (Part 3)" (深山の屋敷（パート3), Miyama no Yashiki (Pāto 3)); 35. "The Deep Mountain Mansion (Part 4)" (深山の屋敷（パート4), Miyama no Yashiki (Pāto 4)); 36. "The Deep Mountain Mansion (Part 5)" (深山の屋敷（パート5), Miyama no Yashiki (Pāto 5)); 37. "The Mithril Sword (Part 1)" (ミスリルの剣（パート 1), Misuriru no Ken (Pāto 1)); 38. "The Mithril Sword (Part 2)" (ミスリルの剣（パート 2), Misuriru no Ken (Pāto 2)); 39. "The Mithril Sword (Part 3)" (ミスリルの剣（パート 3), Misuriru no Ken (Pāto 3))
The lizard, which was left behind in Westia, followed the party out of loyalty and wakes Mofuo up. They defeat Leng before he can rape Brenda and snap her out of the trance. They storm the auction, but Carumba mind controls the audience into attacking them. Mofuo snaps them out of it by urinating on them. Carumba's third eye reveals itself to be a demonic parasite that takes host bodies. It enters Erika's body, but the now freed Carumba helps them destroy it. The people who attended the auction are arrested, but Carumba is judged to be innocent. Samples of Mofuo's urine are collected to deter further mind control attempts. Krone gives Brenda permission to join the party. They go to Central City and ask the king to increase security because of all these attacks, but the king is complacent and overconfident. Mia finished the mithril sword and gives it to Raisa. They take a job to investigate a cave. They find a hot spring inside and bathe, but a group of perverted men arrives. A wendigo steals their clothes and weapons and the men refuse to help, so Mofuo and the lizard pursue while the girls stay in the water to preserve their modesty. Mofuo finds several wendigos offering stolen items to a monster that starts eating them. He tries to shoot it, but it is bulletproof. The girls start to become lightheaded from being in the hot water for too long, allowing the men to convince them to expose themselves and kiss each other for their enjoyment.
8	May 16, 2024	978-4-7859-7662-0
40. "The Mithril Sword (Part 4)" (ミスリルの剣（パート 4), Misuriru no Ken (Pāto 4)); 41. "The Mithril Sword (Part 5)" (ミスリルの剣（パート 5), Misuriru no Ken (Pāto 5)); 42. "The Mithril Sword (Part 6)" (ミスリルの剣（パート 6), Misuriru no Ken (Pāto 6)); 43. "Raisa of the Coward's Scar (Part 1)" (「臆病者の傷」のライサ（パート 1), `Okubyōmono no Kizu' no Raisa (Pāto 1)); 44. "Raisa of the Coward's Scar (Part 2)" (「臆病者の傷」のライサ（パート 2), `Okubyōmono no Kizu' no Raisa (Pāto 2)); 45. "Raisa of the Coward's Scar (Part 3)" (「臆病者の傷」のライサ（パート 3), `Okubyōmono no Kizu' no Raisa (Pāto 3))
Mofuo is at a disadvantage because he cannot dig through the rock to acquire new weapons. The monster releases a gas that makes the perverted men mutate into wendigos, forcing the girls to fight them. A woman named Panarea Rouge offers Mofuo and the lizard her hiding place. She explains the monster turns men into wendigos to serve it and kidnap girls as it eats iron, both from stolen items and from human blood. The girls find a cage with the kidnapped girls and break it open, using the bars as makeshift spears against the wendigos. Mofuo finds a soft area and excavates a rocket launcher. He shoots the monster and knocks it into lava, but it takes Raisa slashing it with her recovered mithril sword to finish it off. As the party celebrates in a tavern, Raisa's old comrades appear and mock her for the time she ran away from a battle. They pervertedly ask Erika to join them, but she beats them up, realizing that they force others to do their work for them. The party takes a job to investigate the seaside town of Corinaz, where mermaid-like sirens have abducted all the men. At Corinaz, the mayor's wife offers them hospitality and explains all the men were enticed by the siren's songs, which do not affect women. An empty fishing boat drifts into the dock. When the party investigates it, the boat drifts out to sea, and the party realizes none of them know how to operate a boat. After a day, they suffer from dehydration and seasickness. The sirens emerge and their song entices Mofuo into jumping overboard where one pulls him under. He wakes up in an air-filled, underwater city. The siren who grabbed him demonstrates that they take human form out of water and shows him that the abducted men are alive, but are turned into sex slaves and are constantly raped. She wants to keep Mofuo as a pet, but the other sirens order her to present him to their queen, who is a giant. Meanwhile, a giant kraken attacks and destroys the fishing boat. The girls wake up on a ship that is on the back of a whale. The female captain berates them for going on the sea unprepared.
9	January 16, 2025	978-4-7859-7853-2
46. "Raisa of the Coward's Scar (Part 4)" (「臆病者の傷」のライサ（パート 4), `Okubyōmono no Kizu' no Raisa (Pāto 4)); 47. "Raisa of the Coward's Scar (Part 5)" (「臆病者の傷」のライサ（パート 5), `Okubyōmono no Kizu' no Raisa (Pāto 5)); 48. "Raisa of the Coward's Scar (Part 6)" (「臆病者の傷」のライサ（パート 6), `Okubyōmono no Kizu' no Raisa (Pāto 6)); 49. "Raisa of the Coward's Scar (Part 7)" (「臆病者の傷」のライサ（パート 7), `Okubyōmono no Kizu' no Raisa (Pāto 7)); 50. "Raisa of the Coward's Scar (Part 8)" (「臆病者の傷」のライサ（パート 8), `Okubyōmono no Kizu' no Raisa (Pāto 8)); 51. "Raisa of the Coward's Scar (Part 9)" (「臆病者の傷」のライサ（パート 9), `Okubyōmono no Kizu' no Raisa (Pāto 9))
The siren queen, Ordia, explains that she is mother of all sirens since her children give her the semen they collect. She orders the siren who grabbed Mofuo, Kako, to extract his semen. The ship captain and only crew member, Merida, has her psychic whale Ikkaku force Raisa, Erika, and Brenda to experience a vision quest where they experience her past. Merida lost her husband to the sirens and joined a pirate crew to find him, but the pirates humiliated her by forcing her to strip naked. The sirens made the pirates jump overboard and she was rescued by Ikkaku, who also wants revenge on the sirens. Kako gives Mofuo's semen to Ordia, but her body rejects it. Furious, she orders him executed, but Kako grabs him and escapes into the ocean, using her powers to keep him from drowning. Ikkaku locates the siren's underwater city and the four girls get in her mouth before she dives down. Along the way, she swallows Mofuo and Kako, reuniting the party while Mofuo explains Kako saved him. Ikkaku rams a hole in the dome and spits everyone out. The party fights off siren guards while Ordia commands jellyfish to plug the hole and goes outside to confront Ikkaku. Ikkaku wants revenge on Ordia for committing genocide on her race, leaving her the last of her kind. Ordia mocks the psychic whales as a weak and useless race, causing Ikkaku to attack in a rage. The shockwaves from their battle start cracking the dome. The party realizes if the fight is not stopped, they will drown.
10	August 16, 2025	978-4-7859-8006-1
11	March 9, 2026	978-4-7859-8146-4
12	October 16, 2026	978-4-7859-8300-0

== See also ==
- Princess Resurrection, another manga series by the same author
- Avarth, another manga series by the same author
- Time Stop Hero, another manga series by the same author
