= Knights of Sidonia =

Japanese manga series and its franchise

- First tankōbon volume cover, featuring Nagate Tanikaze on top of the hand of his mecha, the Tsugumori

シドニアの騎士 (Shidonia no Kishi)
- Genre: Mecha; Space opera
- Manga
- Written by: Tsutomu Nihei
- Published by: Kodansha
- English publisher: NA: Vertical
- Imprint: Afternoon KC
- Magazine: Monthly Afternoon
- Original run: April 25, 2009 – September 25, 2015
- Volumes: 15
- Anime television series
- Directed by: Kōbun Shizuno (S1); Hiroyuki Seshita (S2)
- Written by: Sadayuki Murai
- Music by: Noriyuki Asakura
- Studio: Polygon Pictures
- Licensed by: Crunchyroll (current); Netflix (streaming rights; expired); NA: Sentai Filmworks (home video)
- Original network: MBS, TBS, CBC TV, BS-TBS, AT-X
- English network: SEA: Aniplus Asia
- Original run: April 11, 2014 – June 26, 2015
- Episodes: 24
- Anime film
- Directed by: Kōbun Shizuno
- Written by: Sadayuki Murai
- Music by: Noriyuki Asakura
- Studio: Polygon Pictures
- Licensed by: NA: Sentai Filmworks
- Released: March 6, 2015
- Runtime: 134 minutes
- Light novel

Sidonia no Kishi: Kitto Arifureta Koi
- Written by: Asaura
- Illustrated by: Jun Suemi
- Published by: Kodansha
- Published: April 30, 2021 (digital); May 6, 2021 (print)
- Volumes: 1
- Anime film

Knights of Sidonia: Love Woven in the Stars
- Directed by: Hiroyuki Seshita (chief); Tadahiro Yoshihira
- Written by: Sadayuki Murai; Tetsuya Yamada
- Music by: Shūji Katayama
- Studio: Polygon Pictures
- Licensed by: NA: Funimation
- Released: June 4, 2021
- Runtime: 110 minutes
- icon

Knights of Sidonia (Japanese: シドニアの騎士, Hepburn: Shidonia no Kishi) is a Japanese manga series written and illustrated by Tsutomu Nihei. It was serialized in Kodansha's seinen manga magazine Monthly Afternoon between April 2009 and September 2015, with its chapters collected in 15 tankōbon volumes. It tells the story of Nagate Tanikaze, an "under-dweller" destined to become a Garde pilot, whose mission is to defend the generation ship Sidonia from a hostile alien species called Gauna.

The manga was licensed for English release in North America by Vertical. An anime television series adaptation was produced by Polygon Pictures. The first season aired from April to June 2014; the second between April and June 2015. An anime film sequel titled Knights of Sidonia: Love Woven in the Stars premiered in June 2021.

In 2015, Knights of Sidonia received the 39th Kodansha Manga Award in the general category, as well as the 47th Seiun Award in the Best Comic category in 2016.

== Plot ==
=== Setting ===
The story is set in the year 3394, a thousand years after mankind flees from Earth following its destruction at the hands of a race of shapeshifting aliens, the Gauna (奇居子(ガウナ)), aboard hundreds of colossal spacecraft created from the remains of the planet. One such ship is the Sidonia, which has developed its own human culture closely based on that of Japan where human cloning, asexual reproduction, and human genetic engineering, such as granting humans photosynthesis, are commonplace. It is also revealed that the top echelons of this society have secretly been granted immortality. With a population of over 500,000 people, Sidonia is possibly the last human settlement remaining, as the fates of the other ships are unknown.

Little is known about the true nature of the Gauna or their motivation for attacking humanity. At any given time, a Gauna consists of a nearly impenetrable core protected by a dense layer of malleable flesh known as "placenta" (胞衣, ena). Once the ena is shed away and the core is destroyed, the Gauna's body disintegrates.

While Sidonia itself is heavily armed with an arsenal of high-output beam cannons and mass cannons including slow but powerful planet-destroying warheads, it is primarily defended by large mechanized weapons called Gardes (衛人, Morito) whose weaponry and mobility is powered by "Higgs particles" (ヘイグス粒子, Heigusu Ryūshi), armed with a high-output beam cannon for long range assaults and a special spear known as "Kabizashi" for close combat. The tip of the kabizashi is made of a rare and little-understood material which has the unique property of being able to destroy a Gauna's core. Later the Gardes are also equipped with firearms whose ammunition have the same material of the Kabizashi after a means to artificially mass-produce it is discovered. Most people in the surviving human population are screened and drafted as Garde pilots at a young age, if they are shown to be capable of piloting them.

=== Story ===
The story follows the adventures of Garde pilot Nagate Tanikaze, who lived in the underground layer of Sidonia since birth and was raised by his grandfather. Never having met anyone else, he trains himself in an old Guardian pilot simulator every day, eventually mastering it. After his grandfather's death, he emerges to the surface and is selected as a Garde pilot, just as Sidonia is once again threatened by the Gauna.

== Media ==
=== Manga ===
Written and illustrated by Tsutomu Nihei, Knights of Sidonia was serialized in Kodansha's seinen manga magazine Monthly Afternoon from April 25, 2009, to September 25, 2015. It was compiled in 15 tankōbon volumes, released between September 2009 and November 2015. It was later published in seven shinsōban volumes, released between October and December 2017.

The manga has been licensed in North America by Vertical, who released all 15 volumes in English between February 2013 and April 2016. It was later republished in seven omnibus volumes under the title Knights of Sidonia Master Edition from April 2019 to October 2020; each omnibus volume compiled three-and-a-half regular volumes.

=== Anime ===
An anime television series adaptation, produced by Polygon Pictures, aired its first season from April 10 to June 26, 2014, on MBS and later on TBS, CBC and BS-TBS. The series was directed by Kōbun Shizuno, assisted by Hiroyuki Seshita, with scripts by Sadayuki Murai and character designs by Yuki Moriyama. The opening theme song is "Sidonia" (シドニア, Shidonia), performed by Angela, while the ending theme song is "Show" (掌 -show-, Shō), performed by Eri Kitamura.

A second season aired from April 11 to June 26, 2015. For the second season, the opening theme song is "Kishi Kōshinkyoku" (騎士行進曲, Knight March), performed by Angela, while the ending theme song is "Requiem" (鎮魂歌 -レクイエム-, Rekuiemu), performed by CustomiZ.

The series was localized and streamed by Netflix in all of its territories since July 4, 2014, becoming the service's first original anime, as well as the first anime series on Netflix available in Dolby Vision/HDR. The first season has been licensed for home video release by Sentai Filmworks. The second season was released on Netflix on July 3, 2015, and has been licensed by Sentai Filmworks for home video distribution. In July 2021, Funimation announced they acquired the streaming rights from Netflix to both seasons.

=== Films ===
A compilation film of the first season with additional scenes and re-edited sound effects was released on March 6, 2015.

A new anime film, titled Knights of Sidonia: Love Woven in the Stars, was announced on July 3, 2020. Hiroyuki Seshita served as chief director, while Tadahiro Yoshihira served as director for the new film, with Polygon Pictures returning for production. Sadayuki Murai and Tetsuya Yamada returned to write scripts, while Shūji Katayama composed the music. The rest of the staff and cast returned to reprise their roles. The first four minutes of the film were shown on YouTube on April 28, 2021. The film was set to premiere on May 14, 2021, but was delayed to June 4 due to the COVID-19 pandemic. Funimation screened the film in international theaters starting on September 13, 2021.

=== Light novel ===
A spin-off light novel titled Sidonia no Kishi: Kitto Arifureta Koi (シドニアの騎士 きっとありふれた恋; 'Knights of Sidonia: A Truly Mundane Love') was published digitally on April 30, 2021, and in print on May 6. It was written by Asaura, illustrated by Jun Suemi, and supervised by Tsutomu Nihei. It follows the perspective of an ordinary worker onboard the Sidonia ship.

== Reception ==
=== Manga ===
Knights of Sidonia won the 39th Kodansha Manga Award in the general category in 2015. The manga won the 47th Seiun Award in the Best Comic category in 2016. It also won the Best Seinen category at the 26th Salón del Manga de Barcelona in 2020. It was one of the Jury Recommended works in the Manga Division at the 17th Japan Media Arts Festival in 2013. The Young Adult Library Services Association listed Knights of Sidonia in its 2014 list of Top 10 Graphic Novels for Teens.

Carlo Santos from Anime News Network gave the first manga volume a B, stating, "It is got a young man piloting a giant robot against alien enemies, but Knight of Sidonia is no Neon Genesis Evangelion. Yet it is not as bleak or incomprehensible as Tsutomu Nihei works like Blame! or Biomega, either—rather, it is the best of both worlds, bringing Nihei's hard sci-fi mentality into a more conventional space-adventure environment".

=== Anime ===
The anime series received positive reviews from Japanese industry professionals. Hideo Kojima, creator of the Metal Gear series, said that "It's a kind of anime that we haven't seen for a while that has that sci-fi spirit. Using digital technology cultivated through games, it creates animation that encapsulates Japan's cultural assets like manga, cel animation, kanji, giant robots, etc. What's born is a unique made-in-Japan work that could never be cooked up in Hollywood. Japanese culture has lost its 'cool', and Knights of Sidonia will be the white knight that saves it". Other positive acknowledgements came from Akiko Higashimura and Digitarou.

The Encyclopedia of Science Fiction described Knights of Sidonia as a memorable and energetic science-fiction anime, praising its imaginative worldbuilding, effective storytelling and impressive computer animation, although it found the character animation somewhat stiff. It highlighted the series' exploration of genetic engineering, immortality and gender, comparing its depiction of individuals whose sexual characteristics change to accommodate their partners to Ursula K. Le Guin's The Left Hand of Darkness, and its treatment of predetermined lifespans to Logan's Run. The encyclopedia also identified the influence of the Polish sf writer Stanisław Lem, while calling alien Gauna Lovecraftian. Although it praised the generally likeable cast and numerous strong female characters, it criticized the occasional fan service, limited characterization and relatively weak romantic comedy elements. Nevertheless, it commended the series' ability to evoke a science-fictional sense of wonder.
