= I Cross-Dressed for the IRL Meetup =

Japanese manga series

- Japanese cover for volume 1, depicting Cocoa

女装してオフ会に参加してみた。 (Josou-shite Off-Kai ni Sanka Shite Mita)
- Genre: Romantic comedy
- Manga
- Written by: Kurano
- Published by: Kodansha
- English publisher: NA: Kodansha USA
- Imprint: Magazine Edge KC
- Magazine: Twi Siri
- Original run: January 12, 2020 – November 4, 2022
- Volumes: 5
- Manga

Josou-shite Tomodachi to Machiawase Shitara Bishoujo (?) to Deatta
- Written by: Kurano
- Published: December 17, 2020

I Cross-Dressed for the IRL Meetup (stylized as I (♂) Cross-Dressed for the IRL (♀) Meetup), known in Japan as Josou-shite Off-Kai ni Sanka Shite Mita, (Note: Josou-shite Off-Kai ni Sanka Shite Mita (Japanese: 女装してオフ会に参加してみた。; "I Dressed Up Like a Woman and Joined an Offline Meetup"). Also romanized as Joso Shite Offkai ni Sanka Shitemita.) is a romantic comedy manga series created by Kurano, and published from January 12, 2020, to November 4, 2022. The story follows Cocoa, a young man who dresses up like a woman to join a monthly meetup; he finds himself attracted to Opera, another member of the group, who turns out to also be a cross-dressing man.

Kurano was inspired to create the series after meeting a man cosplaying as a female character at a doujinshi event, and being impressed by the quality of his cosplay. It was originally self-published by Kurano through Twitter and Pixiv as Josou Off-Kai (女装オフ会; "Cross-Dressing Offline Meetup"); it has since been picked up for digital serialization by Kodansha, who also publishes collected print editions of the series. The series has been well received by critics and readers.

== Synopsis ==
I Cross-Dressed for the IRL Meetup is a romantic comedy manga. It follows Satoshi Morinaga, a young man who joins a monthly offline meetup for a group of women, dressing up like a woman for it and going by his online username Cocoa; the other members of the group are Opera, Lemon, and Kantentarou. (Note: Japanese: Satoshi Morinaga (森長聡志, Morinaga Satoshi), Cocoa (ココア, Kokoa), Opera (オペラ), Lemon (レモン, Remon), and Kantentarou (寒天太郎))

Although Cocoa at first goes to the meetings because he enjoys visiting cafés with the others – the stated purpose for the meetups – he continues doing so because he finds himself attracted to Opera, but the fact that he is hiding his gender prevents the two from getting closer. During one meetup, Opera realizes that Cocoa is a cross-dressing man and reveals to him that he also is one; Cocoa begins to wonder if the remaining two members of the group could be cross-dressers too, but realizes that he is rude for speculating about their gender, and comes to terms with how Opera's gender should not affect his attraction to him. The group continues the meetings, and eventually Cocoa learns that Lemon also is cross-dressing, and that Kantentarou is a trans woman.

== Production and release ==
I Cross-Dressed for the IRL Meetup is written and illustrated by Kurano, who was inspired by meeting a man at a doujinshi event who cosplayed as a female character; she was impressed with the quality of the cosplay and how feminine the man looked, and was unable to tell that he was not a woman. She thought that if such things happen in reality, it could in a manga, and that if one cross-dressing character like that could exist, then a second could too.

Because Kurano personally enjoys otokonoko stories, she spent a lot of time agonizing over what would make for an interesting story about cross-dressing before coming up with the scenario. Staying true to her meetings with real cross-dressers, she designed Cocoa to look cute and feminine, but also intentionally wrote his character as male on the inside, Most of all in the series, she enjoyed drawing Opera and considered the sequence where Opera learns that Cocoa is cross-dressing her favorite scene.

The series was originally self-published by Kurano through Twitter and Pixiv starting on January 12, 2020, as Josou Off-Kai; it was later picked up for weekly serialization by Kodansha through their manga magazine Monthly Shōnen Sirius' Twitter account Twi Siri, for which Kurano re-drew all chapters released until that point. The final chapter was published on November 4, 2022. Kodansha also publishes it in collected tankōbon volumes in Japan since December 17, 2020, under its Magazine Edge Comics imprint. The first volume was released simultaneously with another series of Kurano's, Koneko ♂ ga Matterunode Kaerimasu; to mark the occasion, Kurano published a cross-over between the two through Twitter on the same day, Josou-shite Tomodachi to Machiawase Shitara Bishoujo (?) to Deatta. (Note: Japanese: Josou-shite Tomodachi to Machiawase Shitara Bishoujo (?) to Deatta (女装して友達と待ち合わせしたら美少女(？)と出会った; "I Met a Beautiful Girl (?) When I Dressed Up Like a Woman and Met My Friends")) At Anime Expo 2022, Kodansha USA announced that they licensed the series for English publication, with each of their releases covering two volumes of the Japanese edition.

=== Volumes ===
==== Japanese edition ====
No.	Release date	ISBN
1	December 17, 2020	978-4065217511
Chapter 1–10
2	June 17, 2021	978-4065236345
Chapter 11–18
3	December 16, 2021	978-4065262269
Chapter 19–25
4	May 17, 2022	978-4065280850
Chapter 26–32
5	November 16, 2022	978-4065298725
Chapter 33–37

==== English edition ====
No.	Release date	ISBN
1	September 17, 2024	978-1646517831
Chapter 1–18
2	November 19, 2024 (digital); November 26, 2024 (print)	978-1646517848
Chapter 19–32
3	January 21, 2025 (digital); February 25, 2025 (print)	978-1646517855
Chapter 33–37

== Reception ==
I Cross-Dressed for the IRL Meetup has been well received by critics, with NLab calling it an interesting and exciting manga with unexpected plot twists that made them anticipate new chapters. Writing for Natalie, manga editor Moriyoshi Yoshida described it as his recommended manga of the year, finding it exciting to learn about the four main characters' identities and to see how their relationships develop.

The series is also popular with readers, and was ranked by Manga Navi as among the most popular manga about male-to-female cross-dressing as of December 2021. Readers appreciated its depiction of love regardless of gender and the detailed portrayal of how Cocoa tries to hide that he is a man. The Koneko ♂ ga Matterunode Kaerimasu cross-over was also well received by readers for bringing the two series' characters together.
