= Abara =

Japanese manga series

- Manga
- Written by: Tsutomu Nihei
- Published by: Shueisha
- English publisher: NA: Viz Media
- Magazine: Ultra Jump
- Original run: May 19, 2005 – March 18, 2006
- Volumes: 2
- icon

Abara (stylized in all caps) is a Japanese manga series written and illustrated by Tsutomu Nihei. It was serialized in Shueisha's seinen manga magazine Ultra Jump from May 19, 2005, to March 18, 2006, with its chapters collected in two tankōbon volumes.

The series takes place in a dystopian universe characterized by towering edifices. It centers around a particular class of beings, termed Gaunas, who possess the unique ability to mold armaments and protective gear out of bone-like material. The plot centers around one specific Gauna, Kudou Denji.

It was licensed for English release in North America by Viz Media.

== Plot ==
In the future, humans are forced to live in cities connected only by a highway and tubes. Some humans mutate into White Gaunas which pose a threat to mankind. To preserve humanity's future, a group of scientists produced time machines powered by nuclear plants called mausoleums, which can send humans to a distant future to ensure their survival. They also use the energy from these plants to teleport all White Gaunas on Earth present to a separate timeline, and entrust their knowledge to the fourth Eon Group, ensuring that at least a pair of humans can escape into the future. However, White Gauna mutation is still prominent, and as they consume the remaining humans, survivors begin to desperately fight over the facilities. As a result, all but one of the mausoleums are destroyed. The fourth Eon Group is wiped out, but not before uploading remnants of their memories onto computers embedded in the Raven, Skull Man, and Stick, with an Observation Bureau created to safeguard the truth of the mausoleums.

Hundreds of years later, the Observation Bureau study the White Gaunas to counter them and engineer a human-Gauna hybrid known as a Black Gauna, possessing White Gauna abilities but with human minds. Two children, Denji and Nayuta, are used as test subjects. As a control device is implanted in Nayuta, Denji escapes, killing several in the process.

Few years later, Tadohomi requests Denji's help to kill a White Gauna before more casualties occur. After Denji is wounded fighting the Gauna, Sakijima tracks down Tadohomi and arrests her for finding his body. The Observation Bureau sends Nayuta to bring Denji back to them by taking advantage of his wounded state. Their boss believes Black Gaunas are untrustworthy and monstrous like their White cousins. Sakijima is ordered by the Ministry to release Tadohomi, deciding to uncover the truth while suspicious of the Bureau.

A White Gauna spawns, but is able to consume humans before the Bureau takes action. They unsuccessfully send a team of humans, before sending Nayuta to subdue the big White Gauna. Prevailing against another White Gauna, Nayuta falls dead soon after. As she is telepathically linked with her twin Ayuta, any damage sustained by Nayuta is also manifested in Ayuta.

Meanwhile, Sakijima gains intel about the fourth Eon Group and Gaunas through a colleague before heading to Kegen Hall. The colleague is shot by a security guard whom Sakijima kills. Sakijima meets Tadohomi who plans to rescue Denji. He saves Tadahomi from guards, and they enter the room where Denji is held. A revived Ayuta awakens, mutating into a White Gauna. Denji fights Ayuta while Sakijima and Tadohomi flee on helicopter. The fourth Eon Group successors seek to activate a missile believed to be capable of killing the big White Gauna by striking its spinal cord. Denji distracts Ayuta as the missile is primed, with the Skull Man trying to attach the host-less Black Gauna on the missile. The Raven fires the missile with himself, killing the big White Gauna.

The nuclear reactor begins failing with the Forbidden Cage's appearance from insufficient energy to teleport the remaining White Gaunas, so the Stick and Raven guide Tadohomi and Sakijima to the House storing the time machine. Ayuta kills the Raven, before being killed by Nayuta. Tadohomi and Sakijima take cover in the House just as an explosion seemingly destroys Nayuta. The Stick also helps the duo activate the time machine. Many years later, the rest of humanity is wiped out either by White Gaunas or by infighting. Tadohomi and Sakijima depart the overgrown House and look up into the sky. Two Black Gaunas, revealed to be Denji and Nayuta, continue to battle with the White Gaunas, stranded in a separate dimension.

== Reception ==
The manga was nominated for an Eisner Award in the category "Best U.S. Edition of International Material—Asia" in 2019.
