= Biomega (manga) =

Japanese science fiction manga

- Cover of the first manga volume

バイオメガ (Baiomega)
- Genre: Action; Cyberpunk; Thriller
- Manga
- Written by: Tsutomu Nihei
- Published by: Kodansha; Shueisha
- English publisher: NA: Viz Media
- Imprint: Young Magazine KC (2004); Young Jump Comics Ultra (2006–2009)
- Magazine: Weekly Young Magazine (June 14 – September 6, 2004); Ultra Jump (May 19, 2006 – January 19, 2009)
- Original run: June 14, 2004 – January 19, 2009
- Volumes: 6
- icon

Biomega (Japanese: バイオメガ, Hepburn: Baiomega) is a Japanese science fiction manga written and illustrated by Tsutomu Nihei. It was first serialized in Kodansha's seinen manga magazine Weekly Young Magazine in 2004, and later in Shueisha's Ultra Jump from 2006 to 2009; its chapters were collected in six tankōbon volumes.

== Plot ==
Set in the future, the plot follows Zoichi Kanoe and his AI companion Fuyu Kanoe, whose luminous form is integrated into the system of his motorcycle. They are agents sent by TOA Heavy Industries to retrieve humans with the ability to resist and transmute the N5S infection originating from Mars, which is spreading across the world fast, turning humans into "Drones"; disfigured, zombie-like beings.

== Organizations and characters ==
=== TOA Heavy Industries ===
TOA Heavy Industries (東亜重工, Tō-A Jūkō; "East-Asia Industries") is the main rival to the DRF. They are the creators of synthetic humans and have made it their priority to collect those who have adapted to the N5S virus before the DRF does. On February 26, 3006, A.D. TOA Heavy Industries's headquarters self-destructs, leaving the synthetic humans on their own.

Zoichi Kanoe (庚 造一, Kanoe Zōichi)
A synthetic human created by TOA Heavy Industries, and is on a mission to find humans that have adapted to the N5S virus. He meets Eon Green in a Maximum Security Containment Facility, in south district 17 of 9JO, where he had been dispatched. He fails to rescue Eon when she is taken by the Public Health Department. He then starts to track her down. His weapon is a powerful pistol able to rapid firing and he rides a HDC-08B-3 TOA Industries Motorcycle. He is also equipped with a linear accelerator rifle and an axe for close combat.
Fuyu Kanoe (カノエ·フユ, Kanoe Fuyu)
A holographic AI personality of the large black motorcycle ridden by Zoichi. She assists Zoichi with situational analysis as well as advising him on strategies. Like other artificial intelligence systems in the manga, she is programmed with emotions.
Nishu Mizunoe (壬 二銖, Mizunoe Nishu)
A female synthetic human who makes contact with Kozlov Leifnovich Grebnev while she's on a mission to find Loew Grigorievic Grebnev, one of the original founders of the Data Recovery Foundation. She has similar weapons and vehicle as Zoichi.
Shin Mizunoe (ミズノエ·シン, Mizunoe Shin)
The male AI belonging to Nishu.
Go Hinoto (丁 五宇, Hinoto Gō)
He was killed early by Higuide after an otherwise successful intrusion of a Maximum Security Containment Facility, as depicted in the "Interlink" chapter. In there he discovered the new, less virulent pseudo-N5S virus and sent his AI into orbit with this information just before his death.
Tyra Hinoto (ヒノト·タイラ, Hinoto Taira)
A female AI that belonged to the now-deceased TOA Heavy Industries's synthetic human Go Hinoto and his destroyed motorcycle. She was sent into orbit by Go, and later fell down to Earth and was saved from DRF forces by Kozlov Leifnovic Grebnev. Soon after, she joins the Mizunoe unit.

=== Data Recovery Foundation ===
The Data Recovery Foundation (技術文化遺産復興財団, Gijutsu-Bunka-Isan-Fukkō-Zaidan; "Technology, Culture, and Heritage Restoration Foundation"), also known as the "DRF", was founded in 2272 under the name "Microvolt Corporation" and houses the main antagonists of the manga. They are trying to find all existing humans who have adapted to the N5S virus to use them to create their own immortals. They believe that all humans should be infected with the N5S virus, believing that it will remake some of them into the "new human race" and kill off the rest. They call this process "the baptism". After the destruction of TOA Heavy Industries's headquarters, they proclaim themselves the new world government.

Niardi (ニアルディ, Niarudi)
The overlord (or, "Matriarch") of the DRF and also the second oldest person in the world. She is an esper who possesses an advanced form of psychometry which not only allows her to read the "thoughts" of any organic material, whether living or long-since fossilized within inorganic materials, but to "download" such knowledge into herself as well as "hack" and manipulate the source of it (this ability manifesting in white luminescent "worms" that extend from her body and enter the target). As a child working for Microvolt, she used this to subdue Narain when the manifestation of his psychic abilities drove him insane; while her powers did help him regain control of his mind and powers, he has been terrified of her ever since, especially when her control over her own power (ironically) drove her mad. Because her powers work best upon organic material she is reflexively antagonized by anything non-organic, which develops into outright misanthropic technophobia.
The Guardian of the Left (左断吏官, Sa-Danrikan) and the Guardian of the Right (右断吏官, U-Danrikan)
Two superhuman swordsmen who serve Niardi exclusively. They are cyborgs encased in jet-black armor reminiscent of samurai, and carry no weapons other than high-tech katana slung over their shoulders (similar to the "Safeguard Swords" seen in Blame!). The Guardian of the Left is sent to kill Eon Green (but is killed by Zoichi) while the Guardian of the Right protects Niardi during her attack upon the PHS, where he kills Dr. Wildenstein and is later killed by Higuide.

=== Public Health Department ===
The Public Health Service (公衆衛生局, Kōshū-Eisei-Kyoku; "Public Sanitation Bureau"), also known as the "PHS", is a subsidiary of the DRF. Their headquarters is a monadnock. The PHS later turns against the DRF due to Niardi's outrageous intentions, but is quickly overrun by DRF forces.

Narain Meghnad (ナレイン・メグナード, Narein Megunādo)
The General (将軍, Shōgun) of the PHS, originally recruited by Niardi. Fearing Niardi and her powers as well as his own mortality, he changed himself repeatedly, hoping to immunize himself against her mind-reading; his current form is a huge, possibly mutated creature with several tentacles. He was the one who ordered the destruction of TOA Heavy Industries.
Kahdal Spindal (カーダル・スピンダル, Kādaru Supindaru)
A young woman that works for the PHS. She can cover herself in a semi-organic body suit that can be used for both offense and defense, and also possesses some form of psychokinesis. She is first seen taking Eon Green with her from the MSCF of 9JO. Zoichi later meets her in her human form and spends some time with her without knowing who she is. She appears to have some moral qualms regarding orders given her, but never questions her superiors.
Higuide (ヒグイデ, Higaide)
An extremely powerful Patrol Inspector working under Narain. He is highly proficient in the use of bladed weapons and combat techniques, as demonstrated when he is chosen by Narain to execute a fellow Patrol Inspector in a "duel" who was spying for Niardi, and has even succeeded in killing TOA Heavy Industries's agent Go Hinoto. He has also shown impressive agility, dodging a fully charged accelerated round from Nishu's weapon, and destroying multiple "War-Engines" (large battle mecha with enormous destructive capability) in a single battle.
Dr. Wildenstein (ウィルデンシュタイン博士, Wirudenshutain-Hakase)
A brilliant scientist working for the PHS who serves under General Narein. Although he steals the Gravitation Emission Weapon Data from Dr. Mamura Kurokawa of TOA Heavy Industries, he is proficient in other fields, as he manages to modify the N5S virus for the PHS's use. He also learns how to create synthetic humans, and when combining the data, he learns how to use the N5S virus for battle purposes among skilled soldiers or even how to reverse its effects.

=== Immortals ===
The immortals are humans who have adapted to the N5S virus on a genetic level (having 24 pairs of chromosomes after infection), integrating it into their cell structure and giving them inhuman abilities: advanced regeneration and longevity. Called accommodators in US version.

Ion Green (イオン·グリーン, Ion Gurīn)
Born Vief Chiena, is a 17-year-old seemingly immortal girl who has adapted herself to the N5S virus. She is parentless and lives with Kozlov Leifnovich Grebnev in her grandfather's house in south district 17 of 9JO. She has a super-regenerative healing factor. She is taken into custody by the Public Health Department, after which she rarely appears in the manga. She carries some sort of spore in her that can turn all Drones back to normal humans.
Reload (リルオード, Riruōdo)
Another female immortal. She was found on earth about 700 years before the beginning of the story, then being already 300 years old. It was discovered that she had a 24th chromosome, and from time to time her body would secrete small amounts of an unknown substance, similar to plastic. She is the woman found on Mars in the beginning of the story, and afterwards she is never seen aside from flash-backs.

=== Others ===
Kozlov Leifnovich Grebnev (コズロフ·レーフヴィチ·グレブネフ, Kozurofu Rēfuvichi Gurebunefu)
A clone of a scientist who co-found Data Recovery Foundation. The scientist loved Reload, so he created a modified clone of himself that was immortal and compatible with Reload. After transferring his brain to the clone body, he pitied his clone, so he transferred the clone's brain into the body of his pet bear, which was a prototype of the immortal clone body. As a bear he can walk upright, talk and even wield weapons like a human would. He lived with Ion Green and tried to protect her when a patrol officer from the Public Health Department came to get her. He befriends both Zoichi and Nishu after an unfriendly start with both. He saves the AI, Tyra Hinoto, from falling into the hands of the DRF. In the end, it is revealed that the new string world is created from his own consciousness, and he played a crucial role to defeat Niardi.

== Publication ==
Biomega, written and illustrated by Tsutomu Nihei, was first serialized in Kodansha's seinen manga magazine Weekly Young Magazine from June 14 to September 6, 2004. (Note: Serialized in the magazine from the 29th to 41st issues, released on June 14 and September 6, respectively.) Kodansha only released one tankōbon volume on November 5, 2004. The manga was later transferred to Shueisha's Ultra Jump, where it ran from May 19, 2006, to January 19, 2009. (Note: It finished in the magazine's February 2009 issue, released on January 19.) Shueisha collected its chapters in six tankōbon volumes, released from January 19, 2007, to March 19, 2009. Kodansha published a three-volume deluxe edition from April 30 to August 9, 2021.

In North America, the manga was licensed for English release by Viz Media. The six volumes were released from February 2, 2010, to May 17, 2011.

=== Volumes ===
No.	Original release date	Original ISBN	English release date	English ISBN
1	November 5, 2004 (Kodansha); January 19, 2007 (Shueisha)	978-4-06-361282-0 (Kodansha); 978-4-08-877210-3 (Shueisha)	February 2, 2010	978-1-4215-3184-7
2	January 19, 2007	978-4-08-877211-0	May 11, 2010	978-1-4215-3185-4
3	August 17, 2007	978-4-08-877317-9	August 10, 2010	978-1-4215-3186-1
4	February 19, 2008	978-4-08-877405-3	November 9, 2010	978-1-4215-3187-8
5	September 19, 2008	978-4-08-877517-3	February 8, 2011	978-1-4215-3188-5
6	March 19, 2009	978-4-08-877622-4	May 17, 2011	978-1-4215-3277-6

== Reception ==
In a list of "10 Great Zombie Manga", Anime News Network's Jason Thompson placed Biomega in third place, calling it "the greatest science-fiction virus zombie manga ever".
