= Tsutomu Nihei =

Japanese manga artist

Tsutomu Nihei 弐瓶 勉
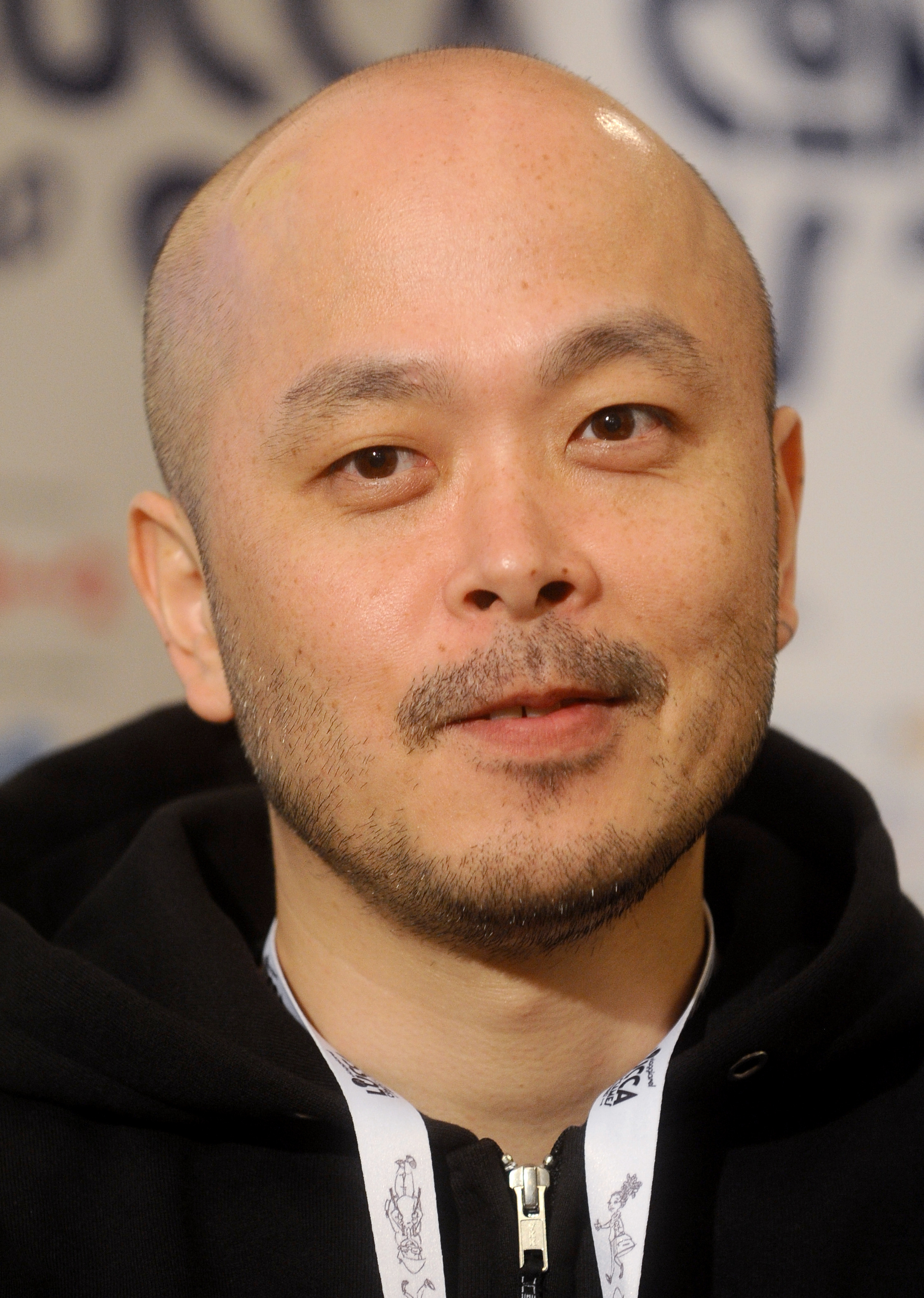
- Nihei at Lucca Comics & Games 2015
- Born: February 26, 1971 (age 55); Kōriyama, Fukushima, Japan
- Education: The New School
- Occupation: Manga artist
- Years active: 1995 – present
- Known for: Blame! Knights of Sidonia
- Website: 東亜重工 TOA Heavy Industries, LLP. at the Wayback Machine (archived 2021-06-04)

Tsutomu Nihei (弐瓶 勉, Nihei Tsutomu; born February 26, 1971) is a Japanese manga artist. Nihei has been drawing comics professionally since the mid-1990s. In 1995, he was awarded the "Jiro Taniguchi Special Prize" in that year's Afternoon Four Seasons Award for his one-shot submission, Blame. After working as an assistant to veteran comic artist Tsutomu Takahashi, Nihei went on to launch his debut series Blame! in Monthly Afternoon in 1997. Following the success of Blame!, he next penned Wolverine: Snikt! (published by Marvel Comics) and Biomega. In 2009, Nihei returned to Monthly Afternoon to launch what would become his most successful series, Knights of Sidonia. An architectural student, Nihei's early works were mainly wordless, relying on visuals and backgrounds to tell their stories. His cyberpunk-influenced artwork has gained a strong cult following worldwide.

== Career ==
Nihei worked in construction but quit to work on becoming a manga artist. He went to New York and studied at the Parsons School of Design. His experience in construction and design has shown up in his manga in his depiction of huge structures which are a strong theme in his manga works.

Nihei has several sources of inspiration, including manga, American comics and Franco-Belgian bandes dessinées. Japanese comics that strongly influenced him include Akira, Nausicaä of the Valley of the Wind and Ghost in the Shell. He was also enormously inspired by Swiss artist H. R. Giger, best known for his airbrush images of humans and machines connected in cold biomechanical relationships. Other sources of inspirations include Hard science fiction novels, Ridley Scott's Blade Runner, French artist Jean "Mœbius" Giraud and Clive Barker of Hellraiser fame. Nihei is also a big video games fan, and mentioned Metroid and the Halo franchise among his favorites. In the mid-2000s, during a trip to the United States, he met the Halo design team, who directly offered him to participate in The Halo Graphic Novel project when they found out that he was a huge fan of the game.

Nihei designed the logo for the record label Lingua Sounda, formed in 2011 by the rock band Buck-Tick. He was a special guest of San Diego Comic-Con in July 2016. He also received an Inkpot Award from Comic-Con International, the organization that runs San Diego Comic-Con and WonderCon. Given to creators for “contributions to the worlds of comics, science fiction/fantasy, film, television, animation, and fandom services,” the Inkpot Award is an honor that Nihei now shares with other comics, film, and sci-fi legends such as Osamu Tezuka, Mœbius, and Ray Bradbury.

In 2024, Nihei created the font TOA Heavy Industries (Japanese: 東亜重工) in partnership with Iwata Corporation.

== Works ==
=== Serialized works ===
- Blame! – Nihei's first work, detailing the adventures of Killy as he searches through a massive city for a human with special genes that could save the world. Originally published in Monthly Afternoon, it also gained a 6 episode ONA. Movie released May 19, 2017.
- NOiSE – A prequel to Blame!, in which a police officer investigates the murder of a gang. Originally published in Afternoon Season Zōkan.
- Abara – Published in Ultra Jump, Abara follows Denji Kudou, a man able to transform into a Gauna – a creature with bone-like armor and weaponry.
- Biomega – Zouichi Kanoe and the AI in his motorbike set out to find humans resistant to N5S, a virus that turns people into zombie-like "Drones". Originally appeared in Young Magazine.
- Knights of Sidonia – An original story set in the far future about a human colony ship's war against an elusive alien race known as the "Gauna". It was published in Monthly Afternoon and is the first of Nihei's works to be adapted into a TV series. In 2015, Knights of Sidonia won the "General" category of the prestigious Kodansha Manga Award.
- Aposimz – Also known as Ningyō no Kuni (人形の国, lit. "Country of Dolls"). Set on an artificial planet where people on the surface face harsh conditions such as extreme cold and "Frame Disease," which slowly transforms people into biomechanical creatures, while people in the core live in luxury. It is licensed by Kodansha Comics, which releases chapters digitally, and Vertical Comics, which releases print volumes.
- Kaina of the Great Snow Sea – A "boy-meets-girl high fantasy" set in a world where land is being swallowed by the encroaching Great Snow Sea. Manga written by Nihei with art by Itoe Takemoto was serialized in Kodansha's shōnen manga magazine Monthly Shōnen Sirius from February 2022 to June 2024, and an anime was released in 2023.
- Tower Dungeon – A "hack-and-slash fantasy" series focusing on a necromancer, who has assassinated the king and kidnapped his daughter, taking refuge in the Tower of the Dragon. It began serialization in Monthly Shōnen Sirius in October 2023.

=== One-shots and additional works ===
- Parcel – A short one-shot about a man looking for his brother.
- Blame – A one-shot prototype for Blame!, collected in NOiSE.
- Blame!² – A full color, 16-page one-shot published in Kodansha's Mandala vol. 2, following up on the story of Blame! with one of Pcell's future incarnations.
- Blame Academy! – A comedy featuring the characters from Blame! as students in a school. Published infrequently.
- Blame! Fortress of Silicon Creatures - A full color, 14-page one-shot epilogue for the 2017 film, it came with its Japanese limited edition Blu-ray set.
- Blame! Movie Edition: The Electrofishers' Escape - A one-shot manga adaptation of the 2017 film.
- Dead Heads – First issue of a cancelled horror manga series; collected, as thumbnails, in Blame! and So On.
- Digimortal – A two-part one-shot about a mercenary hired to assassinate a leader of a new Inquisition. Originally appeared in Ultra Jump, published in vol. 2 of Abara.
- Halo: Breaking Quarantine – Set in the Halo universe, the untold story of Sergeant Avery J. Johnson and his escape from the bowels of Halo and the Flood.
- Negative Corridor – A short one-shot, published in NOiSE.
- Ningyō no Kuni – A short one-shot set on a frozen planet about an encounter between a young man and a mechanical being, acting as a prologue for Aposimz.
- Knights of Sidonia: The Fourth Gauna Defense War - One-shot spin-off from Knights of Sidonia.
- Knights of Sidonia: Tsumugi, I'm addicted to "Blame!" - A short one-shot included in a 2015 Blu-ray booklet and in Blame Academy! and So On new Japanese edition.
- NSE: NetSphere Engineer – A one-shot sequel to Blame!.
- Numa no Kami – A short one-shot about a man encountering a lake Goddess (Akai Kiba vol. 3).
- Pump – A short one-shot about the last humans reproduction process.
- Sabrina – A short one-shot about a man coming across a girl whose arm is stuck in a hole, published in vol. 1 of Akai Kiba doujinshi anthology.
- Idaho - A one-shot published in vol. 2 of Akai Kiba doujinshi anthology.
- (no title) - A 4-page teaser Gundam story published in Gundam Ace.
- Wolverine: Snikt! – A 5 issue limited series of the X-Men character Wolverine. Originally published by Marvel Comics.
- Winged Armor Suzumega / Sphingidae – A short one-shot about a battle between alien beings.
- Zeb-Noid – A short one-shot about a hostile encounter between two different species that takes an unexpected turn.

=== Artbooks ===
- Bitch's Life – An erotic illustrations book, featuring contributions from over twenty manga artists; four of which come from Nihei.
- Blame! and So On – Published in 2003, Blame! and So On contains artwork and sketches for Blame!, Noise, and Wolverine: Snikt!, amongst others; it also contains the illustrations Nihei provided for Bitch's Life and the aborted Dead Heads as thumbnails.
- Megalomania - (STUDIO VOICE、Published in 2000、INFASパブリケーションズ）Collection of artworks by Tsutomu Nihei depicting large scale megastructures.

== Accolades ==
List of awards and nominations
Year	Award	Category	Work/Nominee	Result
1995	Afternoon Four Seasons Award	Jiro Taniguchi Special Prize	Blame	Won
2006	Harvey Awards	Best American Edition of Foreign Material	Blame!	Nominated
2013	17th Japan Media Arts Festival	Manga Division	Knights of Sidonia	Jury Selections
2015	39th Kodansha Manga Award	Best General Manga	Knights of Sidonia	Won
2016	47th Seiun Award	Best Comic	Knights of Sidonia	Won
2016	Inkpot Award	Achievement	Himself	Won
2019	Eisner Award	Best U.S. Edition of International Material—Asia	Abara	Nominated
2020	26th Manga Barcelona	Best Seinen Manga	Knights of Sidonia	Won
