= Monthly Shōnen Sirius =

Japanese manga magazine

- November 2009 cover
- Editor-in-Chief: Takashi Yamaguchi
- Categories: Shōnen manga
- Frequency: Monthly
- Circulation: 6,900; (July–September 2026)
- Publisher: Kodansha
- First issue: May 2005
- Country: Japan
- Based in: Tokyo
- Language: Japanese
- Website: shonen-sirius.com

Monthly Shōnen Sirius (Japanese: 月刊少年シリウス, Hepburn: Gekkan Shōnen Shiriusu) is a Japanese monthly shōnen manga magazine published by Kodansha, and first issued in May 2005. It is issued in perfect-bound B5 format and retails for 580 yen. The magazine also serializes manga through their Twi Siri Twitter account.

== Current series ==
Title	Author	Premiered
Bless	Yukino Sonoyama	2023
Bootsleg	Suzuhito Yasuda	2019
Die Wergelder	Hiroaki Samura	2018
Miraculous: Tales of Ladybug & Cat Noir	Koma Warita (story) and Riku Tsuchida (art)	2021
Mugou no Schnell Gear	Yuzo Takada	2019
Tank Chair	Manabu Yashiro	2024
That Time I Got Reincarnated as a Slime	Fuse (story) and Taiki Kawakami (art)	2015
The Klutzy Class Monitor and the Girl with the Short Skirt	Takuma Yokota	2019
The Masterful Cat Is Depressed Again Today	Hitsuji Yamada	2021
Time Stop Hero	Yasunori Mitsunaga	2019
Tower Dungeon	Tsutomu Nihei	2023
Versus	One (story), Azuma Kyoutarou (art) and Bose (composition)	2022

=== Twi Siri series ===
Title	Author	Premiered	Ref.
I Cross-Dressed for the IRL Meetup	Kurano	2020	
