= Bruce Sterling bibliography =

The bibliography of American science fiction author Bruce Sterling comprises novels, short stories, anthologies, and non-fiction.

== Works ==
=== Novels ===
- Involution Ocean (1977)

A science fiction version of Moby Dick, set in a deep crater filled with dust instead of water, featuring an impossible romance between the protagonist and an alien woman. The book was published as part of a series of books by new authors discovered by Harlan Ellison and was marketed as such.

- The Artificial Kid (1980)

A novel about a young street fighter who continuously films himself using remote controlled cameras.

- Schismatrix (1985)

Nebula Award nominee, 1985; British Science Fiction Association Award nominee, 1986
The 23rd century solar system is divided among two human factions: the "Shapers" who are employing genetics and psychology, and the "Mechanists" who use computers and body prosthetics. The novel is narrated from the viewpoint of Abelard Lindsay, a brilliant diplomat who makes history many times throughout the story.

- Islands in the Net (1988)

Campbell Award winner, 1989; Hugo Award nominee, 1989; Locus SF Award nominee, 1989
A view of an apparently peaceful early twenty-first century with delocalised, networking corporations. The protagonist, swept up in events beyond her control, finds herself in the places off the net, from a datahaven in Grenada, to a Singapore under terrorist attack, and the poorest and most disaster-struck part of Africa.

- The Difference Engine (1990; with William Gibson)

BSFA Award nominee, 1990; Nebula Award nominee, 1991; Campbell Award nominee, 1992
A steampunk alternate history novel set in a Victorian Great Britain in the throes of a steam-driven computer revolution.

- Heavy Weather (1994)

Follows high-tech storm chasers in the American midwest where greenhouse warming has made tornadoes far more energetic than the present day.

- Holy Fire (1996)

BSFA Award nominee, 1996; Hugo Award nominee, 1997; Locus SF Award nominee, 1997
Set in a world of steadily increasing longevity (gerontocracy), a newly rejuvenated American woman drifts through the marginalised subculture of young European artists while dealing with the implications of posthumanism.

- Distraction (1998)

Campbell Award nominee, 1999; Hugo Award nominee, 1999; Locus SF Award nominee, 1999; Clarke Award winner, 2000
A master political strategist and a genius genetic researcher find love as they fight an insane Louisiana governor for control of a high-tech scientific facility in a post-collapse United States. US editions: ISBN 0-553-10484-5 (hardcover), ISBN 0-553-57639-9 (paperback).

- Zeitgeist (2000)

Locus SF Award nominee, 2001
A girl group à la the Spice Girls tours the Middle East under the direction of trickster Leggy Starlitz. Explores a world in which postmodernism and deconstructionism were literally true in their postulation of reality.

- The Zenith Angle (2004)

A techno-thriller about a cyber-security expert who goes to work for the U.S. government fighting terrorism after 9/11.

- The Caryatids (February 2009)

Sibling clones, four female and one male, of the widow of a Balkan war criminal living on a space station, may be able to rescue the Earth from environmental collapse in 2060.

- Love Is Strange (December 2012)
- Pirate Utopia (November 2016), novella, a dieselpunk alternative history set in the Italian Regency of Carnaro.

=== Short stories ===
- Black Swan, 40k, ebook edition, (English | Italian | Portuguese) (2010)
- The Parthenopean Scalpel, 40k, ebook edition, (English | Italian | Portuguese) (2010)
- My Pretty Alluvian Bride, in Brave New Now (edited Liam Young) ebook edition, (English) (2014)
- "Balkan Cosmology" (English) (2022)

=== Short story collections ===
- Crystal Express (1989) – a collection of short stories, including several set in the Shaper/Mechanist universe; ISBN 0-87054-158-7
  - "Swarm"
  - "Spider Rose"
  - "Cicada Queen"
  - "Sunken Gardens"
  - "Twenty Evocations"
  - "Green Days in Brunei"
  - "Spook"
  - "The Beautiful and the Sublime"
  - "Telliamed"
  - "The Little Magic Shop"
  - "Flowers of Edo"
  - "Dinner in Audoghast"
- Globalhead (1992, paperback 1994); ISBN 0-553-56281-9
  - "Our Neural Chernobyl"
  - "Storming the Cosmos"
  - "The Compassionate, the Digital"
  - "Jim and Irene"
  - "The Sword of Damocles"
  - "The Gulf Wars"
  - "The Shores of Bohemia"
  - "The Moral Bullet"
  - "The Unthinkable"
  - "We See Things Differently"
  - "Hollywood Kremlin"
  - "Are You for 86?"
  - "Dori Bangs"
- Schismatrix Plus (1996) - complete Shapers-Mechanists universe
  - Schismatrix
  - "Swarm"
  - "Spider Rose"
  - "Cicada Queen"
  - "Sunken Gardens"
  - "Twenty Evocations"
- A Good Old-fashioned Future (1999); ISBN 1-85798-710-1
  - "Maneki Neko"
  - "Big Jelly" (with Rudy Rucker)
  - "The Littlest Jackal"
  - "Sacred Cow"
  - "Deep Eddy"
  - "Bicycle Repairman"
  - "Taklamakan"
- Visionary in Residence (2006); ISBN 1-56025-841-1
  - "In Paradise"
  - "Luciferase"
  - "Homo Sapiens Declared Extinct"
  - "Ivory Tower"
  - "Message Found in a Bottle"
  - "The Growthing"
  - "User-Centric"
  - "Code"
  - "The Scab's Progress"
  - "Junk DNA"
  - "The Necropolis of Thebes"
  - "The Blemmye's Stratagem"
  - "The Denial"
- Ascendancies: The Best of Bruce Sterling (2007); ISBN 978-1-59606-113-2
  - "Swarm"
  - "Spider Rose"
  - "Cicada Queen"
  - "Sunken Gardens"
  - "Twenty Evocations"
  - "Green Days in Brunei"
  - "Dinner in Audoghast"
  - "The Compassionate, the Digital"
  - "Flowers of Edo"
  - "The Little Magic Shop"
  - "Our Neural Chernobyl"
  - "We See Things Differently"
  - "Dori Bangs"
  - "Hollywood Kremlin"
  - "Are You For 86?"
  - "The Littlest Jackal"
  - "Deep Eddy"
  - "Bicycle Repairman"
  - "Taklamakan"
  - "The Sword of Damocles"
  - "Maneki Neko"
  - "In Paradise"
  - "The Blemmye's Strategem"
  - "Kiosk"
- Gothic High-Tech (2012); ISBN 978-1-59606-404-1
  - "I Saw the Best Minds of My Generation Destroyed by Google"
  - "Kiosk"
  - "The Hypersurface of This Decade"
  - "White Fungus"
  - "The Exterminator's Want Ad"
  - "Esoteric City"
  - "The Parthenopean Scalpel"
  - "The Lustration"
  - "Windsor Executive Solutions" (with Chris Nakashima-Brown)
  - "A Plain Tale from Our Hills"
  - "The Interoperation"
  - "Black Swan"
- Transreal Cyberpunk (2016) by Rudy Rucker and Bruce Sterling; ISBN 978-1-940948-15-7
  - "Big Jelly"
  - "Storming the Cosmos"
  - "Junk DNA"
  - "Hormiga Canyon"
  - "Colliding Branes"
  - "Good Night, Moon"
  - "Loco"
  - "Totem Poles"
  - "Kraken and Sage"
- Robot Artists & Black Swans: The Italian Fantascienza Stories (2021); ISBN 978-1-61696-329-3
  - "Kill the Moon"
  - "Black Swan"
  - "Elephant on Table"
  - "Pilgrims of the Round World"
  - "The Parthenopean Scalpel"
  - "Esoteric City"
  - "Robot in Roses"

=== Anthologies ===
- Mirrorshades: A Cyberpunk Anthology (1986) – defining cyberpunk short story collection, edited by Bruce Sterling; ISBN 0-441-53382-5
  - "The Gernsback Continuum" by William Gibson
  - "Snake-Eyes" by Tom Maddox
  - "Rock On" by Pat Cadigan
  - "Tales of Houdini" by Rudy Rucker
  - "400 Boys" by Marc Laidlaw
  - "Solstice" by James Patrick Kelly
  - "Petra" by Greg Bear
  - "Till Human Voices Wake Us" by Lewis Shiner
  - "Freezone" by John Shirley
  - "Stone Lives" by Paul Di Filippo
  - "Red Star, Winter Orbit" by Bruce Sterling, William Gibson
  - "Mozart in Mirrorshades" by Bruce Sterling, Lewis Shiner
- Sterling, Bruce, ed. (2014). Twelve Tomorrows: MIT Technology Review SF Annual 2014. MIT Press. ISBN 978-0991044412.
  - "Slipping" by Lauren Beukes
  - "Countermeasures" by Christopher Brown
  - "Business as Usual" by Pat Cadigan
  - "Petard: A Tale of Just Deserts" by Cory Doctorow
  - "The Shipping Forecast" by Warren Ellis
  - "Persona" by Joel Garreau
  - "Death Cookie/Easy Ice" by William Gibson
  - "Los Piratas del Mar de Plastico (Pirates of the Plastic Ocean)" by Paul Graham Raven
  - "The Various Mansions of the Universe" by Bruce Sterling
  - "At Home in the Cosmos: A review" by Peter Swirski
- Sterling, Bruce, ed. (2016). Twelve Tomorrows: MIT Technology Review SF Annual 2016. MIT Press. ISBN 978-0262535601.
  - "Boxes" by Nick Harkaway
  - "Life's a Game" by Charles Stross
  - "All the Childhood You Can Afford" by Daniel Suarez
  - "The Lexicography of an Abusive but Divine Relationship with the World" by Ilona Gaynor
  - "The New Us" by Pepe Rojo
  - "It Takes More Muscles to Frown" by Ned Beauman
  - "Consolation" by John Kessel
  - "All-Natural Organic Microbes" by Annalee Newitz
  - "The Internet of Things Your Mother Never Told You" by Jo Lindsay Walton
  - "The Design Doyenne Defeats the Dullness" by Paola Antonelli
  - "The Ancient Engineer" by Bruce Sterling

=== Non-fiction ===
- The Hacker Crackdown: Law and Disorder on the Electronic Frontier (1992) – about the panic of law enforcers in the late 1980s about 'hackers' and the raid on Steve Jackson Games as part of Operation Sun Devil. Spectra Books, ISBN 0-553-56370-X.
- Tomorrow Now: Envisioning the next fifty years (2002) – a popular science approach on futurology, reflecting technology, politics and culture of the next 50 years. Readers of Sterling will recognize many issues from books like Zeitgeist, Distraction or Holy Fire. ISBN 0-679-46322-4
- Shaping Things (2005) is a "book about created objects", i.e. a lengthy essay about design, things and how we will move from the age of products and gizmos to the age of spimes (a Sterling neologism). The 150-pages book covers issues like "intelligent things" (spiked with RFID-tags), sustainability and "fabbing". MIT Press, ISBN 0-262-69326-7.
- The Epic Struggle of the Internet of Things (2014), an ebook examining the hype behind the Internet of Things and a world of connected objects.
