= Dead Media Project =

Art collective founded by Bruce Sterling

- Formation: 1995
- Founder: Bruce Sterling

The Dead Media Project was initially proposed by science fiction writer Bruce Sterling in 1995 as a compilation of obsolete and forgotten communication technologies. Sterling's original motivation for compiling the collection was to present a wider historical perspective on communication technologies that went beyond contemporary excitement for the internet, CD-ROMs and VR systems. Sterling proposed that this collection take form as "The Dead Media Handbook" — a somber, thoughtful, thorough, hype-free, book about the failures, collapses and hideous mistakes of media. In raising this challenge he offers a "crisp $50 dollar bill" to the first person to publish the book, which he envisions as a "rich, witty, insightful, profusely illustrated, perfectbound, acid-free-paper coffee-table book".

After articulated in the manifesto "The Dead Media Project — A Modest Proposal and a Public Appeal," The Dead Media Project began as a number of persons collecting their notes and the spreading of the archive through a mailing list, moderated by Tom Jennings. This resulted in a large collective of "field notes" about obsolete communication technologies, about 600 in total archived online. The project lost momentum in 2001 and the mailing list died.

The project archive includes a wide variety of notes from Incan quipus, through Victorian phenakistoscopes, to the departed video games and home computers of the 1980s. Dead still-image display technologies include the stereopticon, the Protean View, the Zograscope, the Polyorama Panoptique, Frith's Cosmoscope, Knight's Cosmorama, Ponti's Megalethoscope (1862), Rousell's Graphoscope (1864), Wheatstone's stereoscope (1832), and dead Viewmaster knockoffs.

In 2009, artist Garnet Hertz published a bookwork project titled "A Collection of Many Problems (In Memory of the Dead Media Handbook)" which strove to fulfill some of Bruce Sterling's vision for a handbook of obsolete media technologies. In the book, Hertz presents images of many of the media technologies compiled through the Dead Media mailing list and invites readers to submit their sketches and ideas of a Dead Media Handbook.

== See also ==
- Media studies
- Riepl's law
