= Jayme Lynn Blaschke =

American journalist and author (born 1969)

Jayme Lynn Blaschke (born 1969) is an American journalist and author of science fiction, fantasy and related non-fiction. Primarily known for his genre-related interviews with authors and editors, he published a collected volume of 17 interviews, Voices of Vision: Creators of Science Fiction and Fantasy Speak, through the University of Nebraska Press in 2005. In 2016 he published an extensively-researched history of the infamous brothel that served as the inspiration behind The Best Little Whorehouse in Texas titled Inside the Texas Chicken Ranch: The Definitive Account of the Best Little Whorehouse. A revised, updated and expanded edition was published in 2023 to mark the 50th anniversary of the brothel's closure.

Blaschke earned his B.A. in journalism from Texas A&M University in 1992 and has worked as both a writer and editor in print journalism and media relations fields. From December 2002 through December 2005 he served as fiction editor for RevolutionSF. In 2006 he founded No Fear of the Future, a group blog featuring contributors such as Chris Nakashima-Brown, Stephen Dedman, Alexis Glynn Latner, Jess Nevins and Zoran Živković. He is an active member of Science Fiction and Fantasy Writers of America and served as that organization’s director of media relations 2006-2012. Blaschke resides in New Braunfels, Texas, and is a member of the Turkey City Writer's Workshop.

== Partial bibliography ==
BOOKS

Inside the Texas Chicken Ranch: The Definitive Account of the Best Little Whorehouse, The History Press, August 2016
Voices of Vision: Creators of Science Fiction and Fantasy Speak, University of Nebraska Press, April 2005

SHORT FICTION

"Bad Tamales," Southern Fried Cthulhu, Mechanoid Press, August 2024
"It Gazes Back," with Don Webb, Black Cat Weekly No. 32, April 2022
"Mother of Sprits," The Thackery T. Lambshead Cabinet of Curiosities, HarperVoyager, July 2011
"Apostate Treasures, LTD.," No Fear of the Future, December 2009
"A Plague of Banjos," Electric Velocipede, No. 15-16, winter 2008
"The Whale Below," Fast Ships, Black Sails, Night Shade Books, December 2008
"The Makeover Men," HelixSF, No. 6, October 2007
"Being an Account of the Final Voyage of La Riaza: A Circumstance in Eight Parts," Interzone No. 210, June 2007
"Coyote for President," RevolutionSF.com, November 2006
"Prince Koindrindra Escapes," Cross Plains Universe: Texans Celebrate Robert E. Howard, F.A.C.T./MonkeyBrain, October 2006
"The Days of Rice and Assault," The World Wide Realm of Jayme Lynn Blaschke, July 2005
"Simultas," Kings of the Night III, Cyberpulp, August 2004
"Devil In a Tiny Little Ocean Bloc Container," The Leading Edge No. 42, October 2001
"Cyclops in B Minor," Writers of the Future vol. 14, Bridge Publications, 1998
"The Dust," Interzone No. 129, March 1998
"Project Timespan," Interzone No. 116, Feb 1997

INTERVIEWS

Wil McCarthy, The Brutarian No. 54, winter 2010
Allen Steele, The Brutarian No. 53, spring 2009
Joe Haldeman, The Brutarian No. 52, fall 2008
Peter S. Beagle, The Brutarian No. 48-49, winter 2007
Jacqueline Carey, The Brutarian No. 46, Spring 2006
Peter David, The Brutarian No. 44, Summer 2005
Lois McMaster Bujold, Postscripts No. 3, Spring 2005
Scott Edelman, Voices of Vision: Creators of Science Fiction and Fantasy Speak, University of Nebraska Press, April 2005
Paul Dini, RevolutionSF.com, Aug. 2004
Kage Baker, Postscripts No. 2, Summer 2004
Lucius Shepard, StrangeHorizons.com, Jan. 2004
David Drake, The Brutarian No. 40, Fall 2003
Rick Klaw, SFSite.com, Nov. Dec. 2003
Vernor Vinge, StrangeHorizons.com, Sept. 2003
Judd Winick, The Unofficial Green Arrow Fansite, May 2003
Martha Wells, Interzone No. 187, March 2003
Michael Moorcock, The Brutarian No. 38, Spring 2003
Robin Hobb/Megan Lindholm, 3SF Magazine No. 2, Dec. 2002
Terry Brooks, The Science Fiction Chronicle No. 230, Nov. 2002
Frank Cho & Scott Kurtz, RevolutionSF.com, Nov. 2002
John Gregory Betancourt, SFSite.com, Oct. 2002
Bruce Sterling, Interzone No. 181, Aug. 2002
Neil Gaiman, RevolutionSF.com, May 2002
Stephen Dedman, The Brutarian No. 35, spring 2002
Brad Meltzer, The Unofficial Green Arrow Fansite, Feb. 2002
Elliot S! Maggin, The Unofficial Green Arrow Fansite, Nov. 2001
Joe R. Lansdale, The Brutarian No. 34, fall 2001
Gene Wolfe, Black Gate No. 2, summer 2001
Samuel R. Delany, SFSite.com, June 2001
Darren Vincenzo, The Unofficial Green Arrow Fansite, May 2001
Charles de Lint, Interzone No. 163, Jan. 2001
Walter Jon Williams, Interzone No. 162, Dec. 2000
Steven Gould & Laura Mixon, Interzone No. 160, Oct. 2000
Stanley Schmidt, SFSite.com, July 2000
Harlan Ellison, Interzone No. 156, June 2000
Elizabeth Moon, SFSite.com, Feb. March 2000
Patricia Anthony, Interzone No. 144, June 1999
Gordon Van Gelder, GreenManReview.com, April 1999
J.V. Jones, Interzone No. 142, April 1999
Jack Williamson, Interzone No. 139, Jan. 1999
Gardner Dozois, GreenManReview.com, Jan. 1999
Kristine Kathryn Rusch, Interzone No. 138, Dec. 1998
