= Nova Express (fanzine) =

American science fiction fanzine

Nova Express was a Hugo-nominated science fiction fanzine edited by Lawrence Person. Nova Express is named after William S. Burroughs' Nova Express and the fictional magazine Nova Express in Alan Moore's Watchmen. It remained in publication between 1987 and 2002.

== History and profile ==
Nova Express, established in 1987, was a sercon fanzine with a focus on written science fiction, featuring interviews, reviews and critical articles. The magazine was headquartered in Austin, Texas. It was published on a quarterly basis, but after 1990 it was published irregularly.

Many professional science fiction writers and major critics contributed to it over the years, including John Clute, Jack Dann, Stephen Dedman, Andy Duncan, Howard V. Hendrix, Fiona Kelleghan, Ken MacLeod, Chris Nakashima-Brown, Mike Resnick, Justina Robson, Brian Stableford, Bruce Sterling, Jeff VanderMeer, Howard Waldrop, and Don Webb.

Writers who were interviewed by Nova Express include Stephen Baxter, James P. Blaylock, Pat Cadigan, Bradley Denton, Paul Di Filippo, Steve Erickson, Neil Gaiman, K. W. Jeter, John Kessel, Joe R. Lansdale, George R. R. Martin, Pat Murphy, Tim Powers, Kim Stanley Robinson, Pamela Sargent, William Browning Spencer, Bruce Sterling, Sean Stewart, Howard Waldrop, Walter Jon Williams, and Gene Wolfe.

It also published "theme" issues focusing on a particular aspect of speculative fiction, including steampunk, slipstream, and postcyberpunk. In Summer 2002 Nova Express ceased publication.

== Awards and honors ==
Nova Express was a 1997 Hugo Award nominee for Best Fanzine.
