= Punk genres =

Punk genres can refer to:

- Punk rock subgenres, subgenres to punk rock music
- Literary punk genres, see Cyberpunk derivatives
