= Red as Blood, or Tales from the Sisters Grimmer =

Short story collection by Tanith Lee

- Author: Tanith Lee
- Illustrator: Tanith Lee
- Cover artist: Michael Whelan
- Language: English
- Genre: Fantasy
- Publisher: DAW Books
- Publication date: 1983
- Publication place: United States
- Media type: Print (hardback)
- Pages: 208 pp
- ISBN: 0-87997-790-6
- OCLC: 9146663
- LC Class: CPB Box no. 2744 vol. 23

Red as Blood, or Tales from the Sisters Grimmer is a short story collection of dark fantasy retellings of popular fairytales by British author Tanith Lee. Contrary to what the title may suggest, it not only includes retellings of fairytales by the Brothers Grimm, but also by Charles Perrault, Gabrielle-Suzanne Barbot de Villeneuve or Alexander Afanasyev. The title story was nominated for a Nebula Award.

== Contents ==
Red as Blood, or Tales from the Sisters Grimmer contains the following tales:

1. "Paid Piper" – Asia: 1st century BC (retelling of "Pied Piper of Hamelin")
2. "Red as Blood" – Europe: 14th century (retelling of "Snow White")
3. "Thorns" – Eurasia: 15th century (retelling of Sleeping Beauty)
4. "When The Clock Strikes" – Europe: 16th century (retelling of "Cinderella")
5. "The Golden Rope" – Europe: 17th century (retelling of Rapunzel)
6. "The Princess And Her Future" – Asia: 18th century (retelling of "The Frog Prince")
7. "Wolfland" – Scandinavia: 19th century (retelling of "Little Red Riding Hood")
8. "Black As Ink" – Scandinavia: 20th century (retelling of Swan Lake)
9. "Beauty" – Earth: The future (retelling of Beauty and the Beast)

In 2014, the book was released as an expanded edition including a new story, "The Waters of Sorrow", which had been previously published in 2011 in Weird Tales.

== Reception ==
Dave Langford reviewed Red as Blood for White Dwarf #48, and stated that "Fun: but these inversions can become repetitious, while Lee's SF 'Beauty and the Beast' founders in a morass of soggy pseudoscience."

== Reviews ==
- Review by Faren Miller (1983) in Locus, #264 January 1983
- Review by Frank Catalano (1983) in Amazing Science Fiction, July 1983
- Review by Baird Searles (1983) in Isaac Asimov's Science Fiction Magazine, August 1983
- Review by Joe Sanders (1983) in Starship, Winter 1983-84
- Review by Vincent Omniaveritas (1983) in Cheap Truth #1
- Review by Bruce Sterling (1983) in Cheap Truth #1
