= Turkey City Writer's Workshop =

Professional science fiction writer's workshop in Texas, U.S.

Turkey City Writer's Workshop is a peer-to-peer, professional science fiction writer's workshop in Texas. Founded in 1973 and still ongoing today, it was consciously modeled after the east coast Milford Writer's Workshop. The workshop "was a cradle of cyberpunk" where many of the practitioners of what would become cyberpunk first met.

Founding members of the group included Lisa Tuttle, Howard Waldrop, Steven Utley, and Tom Reamy. The workshop was first held in Grand Prairie, Texas, but soon shifted to Austin when most of the writers involved moved there during the mid-1970s. Bruce Sterling was one of the youngest members of the workshop when he joined it in 1974. Harlan Ellison "discovered" Sterling at Turkey City and arranged for the publication of his first novel. Other writers who have attended Turkey City include Ted Chiang, Paul Di Filippo, Cory Doctorow, Andy Duncan, George Alec Effinger, Mark Finn, Steven Gould, Eileen Gunn, Leigh Kennedy, John Kessel, Rick Klaw, Raph Koster, George R. R. Martin, Maureen McHugh, Paul O. Miles, Chris Nakashima-Brown, Chad Oliver, Lawrence Person, Jessica Reisman, Chris Roberson, Jayme Lynn Blaschke, Lewis Shiner, Lou Antonelli, John Shirley, Jeff VanderMeer, Don Webb, Martha Wells, and Connie Willis.

The workshop also compiled "The Turkey City Lexicon", a collection of terms used when discussing recurring SF writing tropes. This guide for writers has been used and adapted by other writers workshops, both within and outside the science fiction genre.
