= Sercon =

In science fiction, sercon is "serious and constructive" criticism, often published as science fiction fanzines. The term was originally coined in the 1950s by Canadian fan Boyd Raeburn as a pejorative to mock those fans who took science fiction, its criticism, and themselves too seriously.

The term began by the 1970s to be used without pejorative intent to describe fanzines and even conventions which were of a more studious or literary bent. Examples of sercon fanzines and semi-prozines include The New York Review of Science Fiction, Science Fiction Eye, Cheap Truth, Nova Express, Thrust/Quantum, and SF Commentary, among others. Conventions sometimes described as sercon include WisCon, Potlatch, and Readercon.
