= Swarm (novelette) =

1982 novelette by Bruce Sterling

- Short story by Bruce Sterling
- Country: United States
- Language: English
- Genre: Science fiction short story

Publication
- Published in: The Magazine of Fantasy & Science Fiction
- Publication date: April 1982

"Swarm" is a science fiction novelette by Bruce Sterling, and his first magazine sale (his previous publications were either novels or anthology contributions). It was first published in The Magazine of Fantasy & Science Fiction in 1982, and later republished in the Sterling's 1989 collection Crystal Express as well as in numerous anthologies. "Swarm" was nominated for the Nebula, Hugo and Locus Awards.

"Swarm" is the first published work in Sterling's Shaper/Mechanist universe.

In 2022, "Swarm" was adapted as an animated short in Netflix's anthology Love, Death & Robots (vol III, episode 6).

== Plot summary ==
The Shaper Captain-Doctor Simon Afriel, a passenger in an Investor ship, arrives at an asteroid in another solar system to study a colony of a non-intelligent species known as the Swarm. Their society has an insect-like hierarchy with a queen and different castes, and also hosts some degenerated alien species known with a common name as symbiotes which live as parasites or in commensal relationships with the others.

Afriel plans to stay for two years and study the Swarm, together with another Shaper called Galina Mirny who was already there. Their intentions are partly to prevent the Mechanists from benefiting from it, and partly to find a way to use the hive pheromones to control and manipulate the species, so that they can establish a colony in their own solar system with Swarm that work for them.

Once on-board the hive at first seems to take no notice of the visitors. But when they start experimenting with artificial pheromones this creates a chemical imbalance that triggers the colony's instinctive mechanisms, who recognize it as a sign of the presence of intelligence. The queen lays an egg that develops into a new form which is vigorously protected during development. Once fully developed it is revealed to be a new caste with superior intelligence and a well developed genetic memory derived from multiple species. It reveals that all the other castes have only sufficient intelligence to perform their assigned roles. The new form, that refers to itself as Swarm for the lack of a better name, is another reflection of the nest, a specialized form that serves the nest in its assigned role.

Swarm acts as part of the superorganism's immune system, and sees unbound intelligence as self-destructive and its presence as a threat to the survival of the colony in the long run. It reveals that humans are not the first race who have invaded the place. Fifteen other intelligent species have done so on precedent occasions and become symbiotes, new members of the colony. When it happens, the representatives of the species that are present are assimilated and become part of the alien society's genetic collective. Using the same principles as the creation of antibodies through a vaccine, the added genetic material gives birth to numerous superior and loyal individuals of the assimilated race, who will attack and deal with the "infection" the next time their previous kinship arrives and tries to invade the Swarm.

The symbiotes will then gradually degenerate over the following generations, becoming less and less intelligent until their intellect disappears completely and they become nothing more than genetic memories of their ancestors with no other purpose in existence than survival itself, like DNA remnants from microbes that once invaded a species' genome. And they will be the only surviving descendants of their race according to Swarm, because racial immortality is only possible without intelligence. Based on Swarm's experiences, a race "infected" with intelligence only lasts for a few thousand years, and is then never heard from again:

They have passed beyond my ken. They have all discovered something, learned something, that has caused them to transcend my understanding. It may be that they even transcend being. At any rate, I cannot sense their presence anywhere. They seem to do nothing, they seem to interfere in nothing; for all intents and purposes, they seem to be dead. Vanished. They may have become gods, or ghosts. In either case, I have no wish to join them.
