= Rewired: The Post-Cyberpunk Anthology =

2007 science fiction anthology edited by James Patrick Kelly and John Kessel

- First edition cover
- Author: edited by James Patrick Kelly and John Kessel
- Cover artist: Patty Nason
- Language: English
- Genre: Science fiction
- Publisher: Tachyon Publications
- Publication date: October 1, 2007
- Publication place: United States
- Media type: Print (paperback)
- Pages: 320
- ISBN: 1-892391-53-8
- OCLC: 154705112

Rewired: The Post-Cyberpunk Anthology (ISBN 1892391538, 2007) is a collection of postcyberpunk short stories, published by Tachyon Publications and edited by James Patrick Kelly and John Kessel. It features 16 short stories which fall into the loose categorization of postcyberpunk, intercut with excerpts from a series of letters exchanged by Kessel and fellow science fiction author Bruce Sterling in which they discuss and debate the nature of cyberpunk, the implication being that the issues which they raise have led to the formation of the postcyberpunk trend.

== Contents ==
- "Bicycle Repairman" by Bruce Sterling
- "Red Sonja and Lessingham in Dreamland" by Gwyneth Jones
- "How We Got in Town and Out Again" by Jonathan Lethem
- "Yeyuka" by Greg Egan
- "The Final Remake of The Return of Little Latin Larry With a Completely Remastered Soundtrack and the Original Audience" by Pat Cadigan
- "Thirteen Views of a Cardboard City" by William Gibson
- "The Wedding Album" by David Marusek
- "Daddy's World" by Walter Jon Williams
- "The Dog Said Bow-Wow" by Michael Swanwick
- "Lobsters " by Charles Stross
- "What's Up, Tiger Lily" by Paul Di Filippo
- "The Voluntary State" by Christopher Rowe
- "Two Dreams on a Train" by Elizabeth Bear
- "The Calorie Man" by Paolo Bacigalupi
- "Search Engine" by Mary Rosenblum
- "When Sysadmins Ruled the Earth" by Cory Doctorow
