= Bicycle Repairman =

- Short story by Bruce Sterling
- Country: United States
- Language: English
- Genre: Science fiction short story

Publication
- Published in: Intersections: The Sycamore Hill Anthology
- Publication type: Anthology
- Publisher: Tor Books
- Media type: Hardback
- Publication date: 1996

"Bicycle Repairman" is a postcyberpunk short story by American science fiction writer Bruce Sterling. It deals with the eponymous character, who lives in a functioning anarchist community in the near future and has an encounter with the misguided authorities. As is common in Sterling's stories, it deals with issues of markets, governance and the tensions between the two.

"Bicycle Repairman" was first published in Intersections in 1996. It won a Hugo Award for Best Novelette in 1997. It was reprinted in a 1999 collection of Sterling's work, A Good Old-Fashioned Future, and again in 2007 in Rewired: The Post-Cyberpunk Anthology.
