= Whitechapel Gods =

2008 novel by S. M. Peters

- Author: S. M. Peters
- Cover artist: Cliff Nielsen
- Language: English
- Genre: Science fiction
- Publication date: 2008
- Publication place: United States
- Media type: Print (Paperback)
- Pages: 384
- ISBN: 978-0-451-46193-3

Whitechapel Gods is a 2008 Canadian Clockpunk/retro-futuristic novel written by S. M. Peters. It was first published on February 5, 2008, through Roc Books.

== Background ==
Whitechapel Gods is the debut novel of Canadian school teacher Shawn Peters who was living in Kamloops, British Columbia, at the time of writing. The premise for the novel was inspired by a computer glitch that Peters encountered that was interfering with his work. The glitch led him to consider whether the machine was working for him or if he was working for the computer. Peters wrote the novel in less than a year and sold it to a publishing agent while attending an international writers conference.

== Synopsis ==
The book is set in Victorian London where its inhabitants are shut off from the outside world by two mysterious and mechanical deities, Mama Engine and Grandfather Clock. The humans had tried and failed to rise up against the Boiler Men that oppress them, an attempt that cost several lives. In the meantime a strange disease has begun to progress across the remaining people, slowly turning them into machines.

== Reception ==
Critical reception has been mixed. The Library Journal gave Whitechapel Gods a favorable review, writing "Peters's first novel evokes the grittiness of industrial dystopia, adding an element of the supernatural that gives an eerie twist to a familiar venue." Steampunk Magazine gave it a mixed review, praising Peters' world building while criticizing the work for its depiction of women, stating that there were only three female characters, one of which was "either being noted for her unladylike behavior or a helpless pawn of the Bad Guy, and when she finally gets the revenge she’s spent the whole book seeking she’s treated like a madwoman." They went on to state "Of the other two women who contribute to the plot, one is a generic Evil Woman with no character development of any kind, and one is a machine-deity whose biggest contribution to the plot is having an “affair” with the Bad Guy which is written more like a sexual assault."
