= Mirrorshades =

1986 anthology edited by Bruce Sterling

Mirrorshades: The Cyberpunk Anthology
- First edition cover
- Editor: Bruce Sterling
- Cover artist: Abbe Lubell
- Language: English
- Genre: Cyberpunk
- Publisher: Arbor House
- Publication date: 1986
- Publication place: United States
- ISBN: 978-0-87795-868-0
- OCLC: 13945407
- Dewey Decimal: 813/.0876/08 19
- LC Class: PS648.S3 M57 1986

Mirrorshades: The Cyberpunk Anthology (1986) is an anthology of cyberpunk short stories, edited by American writer Bruce Sterling.

== Contents ==
- "The Gernsback Continuum" by William Gibson
- "Snake-Eyes" by Tom Maddox
- "Rock On" by Pat Cadigan
- "Tales of Houdini" by Rudy Rucker
- "400 Boys" by Marc Laidlaw
- "Solstice" by James Patrick Kelly
- "Petra" by Greg Bear
- "Till Human Voices Wake Us" by Lewis Shiner
- "Freezone" by John Shirley
- "Stone Lives" by Paul Di Filippo
- "Red Star, Winter Orbit" by Bruce Sterling and William Gibson
- "Mozart in Mirrorshades" by Bruce Sterling and Lewis Shiner

== Reception ==
Kirkus Reviews found the collection "an above-average introduction to cyberpunk writing" but noted that "The best story is wildly out of place: Greg Bear's famous, astonishing, surreal 'Petra'". It concluded that "it's hard to take all the movement/club paraphernalia seriously: would that editor Sterling's introductions were more firmly tongue in cheek".

Sterling's preface to the anthology was reprinted in Larry McCaffery's 1991 book Storming the Reality Studio: A Casebook of Cyberpunk and Modern Science Fiction. The volume's introductory essay describes Mirrorshades as the "first and still definitive collection of cyberpunk short fiction".

By 2007, studies were describing the book as a classic.

In a 2019 essay, Graham Murphy writes that the anthology is "more than a collection of stories: It is also Sterling's attempt to map cyberpunk's contours and integrate competing sensibilities, and what emerges is a tension between a rebellious group of authors content to sneer at the mainstream from the margins and an increasingly popular(ized) movement that was slowly becoming the mainstream". He describes the stories as wildly varied and the anthology as characterised by "narrative diversity or, perhaps more dismissively, incoherence".

== Awards ==
The anthology was placed fourth in the anthology category in the 1987 Locus Awards.
