= Crystal Express =

1989 collection of science fiction and fantasy stories by Bruce Sterling

- Dust-jacket illustration by Rick Lieder for Crystal Express
- Author: Bruce Sterling
- Illustrator: Rick Lieder
- Cover artist: Rick Lieder
- Language: English
- Genre: Science fiction, fantasy
- Publisher: Arkham House
- Publication date: 1989
- Publication place: United States
- Media type: Print (hardback)
- Pages: 264
- ISBN: 0-87054-158-7
- OCLC: 19352012
- Dewey Decimal: 813/.0876 19
- LC Class: PS3569.T3876 C79 1989

Crystal Express is a collection of science fiction and fantasy stories by American author Bruce Sterling. It was released in 1989 by Arkham House. It was initially published in an edition of 4,231 copies and was the author's first book published by Arkham House.

Many of the stories appeared in Isaac Asimov's Science Fiction Magazine and The Magazine of Fantasy and Science Fiction, and the first five stories are set in Sterling's Shaper/Mechanist universe.

== Contents ==
Crystal Express contains the following stories:

- "Swarm" (1982; set in 2248) – Shaper Captain Simon Afriel joins a fellow researcher in an interstellar embassy: an asteroid belt inhabited by colonies of insect-like aliens. Afriel also briefly appears in "Twenty Evocations" and Schismatrix. It was the first Shaper/Mechanist story.
- "Spider Rose" (1982; set in 2283) – An ancient Mechanist from the fringes of the Solar System buys something new from the Investors: a pet. Spider Rose herself appears very briefly during happier times in Schismatrix.
- "Cicada Queen" (1983; set in 2354) – A Shaper named Landau comes of age politically inside Czarina-Kluster, a habitat independent of faction where backroom deals and social cliques dominate, and whose stability is becoming increasingly fragile. Wellspring, a visionary rogue Mechanist and leading proponent of the post-humanist philosophy, is Landau's mentor. Schismatrix later expands on the background of both Wellspring and C-K, which he helped found.
- "Sunken Gardens (1984; set in 2554) – Individuals from various factions compete in a test of terraforming skills in a crater on the Martian surface. This story expands on the influence and power of Terraform-Kluster and its leader, the enigmatic Lobster King (who first appears in "Cicada Queen").
- "Twenty Evocations" (1984; originally published as "Life in the Shaper/Mechanist Era: Twenty Evocations"; set around 2220–2400) – An experimental story; fragments from the life of a Shaper named Nikolai Leng.
- "Green Days in Brunei" – Canadian engineer Turner Choi is setting up a robotic shipyard in a small country that has completely isolated itself from 'The Net'. Choi contemplates the future course of his life while interacting with, among others, an aging tax-exiled British rock star and a rebellious princess.
- "Spook"
- "The Beautiful and the Sublime"
- "Telliamed"
- "The Little Magic Shop"
- "Flowers of Edo"
- "Dinner in Audoghast"

== Sources ==
- Chalker, Jack L.; Mark Owings (1998). The Science-Fantasy Publishers: A Bibliographic History, 1923-1998. Westminster, MD and Baltimore: Mirage Press, Ltd. p. 57.
- Joshi, S.T. (1999). Sixty Years of Arkham House: A History and Bibliography. Sauk City, WI: Arkham House. p. 159. ISBN 0-87054-176-5.
- Nielsen, Leon (2004). Arkham House Books: A Collector's Guide. Jefferson, NC and London: McFarland & Company, Inc. p. 135. ISBN 0-7864-1785-4.
