= Spime =

Spime is a neologism for a futuristic object, characteristic to the Internet of Things, that can be tracked through space and time throughout its lifetime. They are essentially virtual master objects that can, at various times, have physical incarnations of themselves. An object can be considered a spime when all of its essential information is stored in the cloud. Bruce Sterling sees spimes as coming through the convergence of six emerging technologies, related to both the manufacturing process for consumer goods, and through identification and location technologies. Depending on context, the term "spime" can refer to both—the archetype, as designed by the developer, or a user-specific instance of it.

== Origin ==
The term spime was coined for this concept by author Bruce Sterling. It is a contraction of "space" and "time", and was probably first used in a large public forum by Sterling at SIGGRAPH Los Angeles, August 2004. The idea was further expanded upon in his book Shaping Things. Since, the use of the term by researchers and in industry has grown.

== Concept ==
The six facets of spimes are:

1. Small, inexpensive means of remotely and uniquely identifying objects over short ranges; for example radio-frequency identification.
2. A mechanism to precisely locate something on Earth, such as a global-positioning system.
3. A way to mine large amounts of data for things that match some given criteria, like internet search engines.
4. Tools to virtually construct nearly any kind of object; computer-aided design.
5. Ways to rapidly prototype virtual objects into real ones. Sophisticated, automated fabrication of a specification for an object, through “three-dimensional printers.”
6. "Cradle-to-cradle" life-spans for objects. Cheap, effective recycling.

With all six of these, one could track the entire existence of an object, from before it was made (its virtual representation), through its manufacture, its ownership history, its physical location, until its eventual obsolescence and breaking-down back into raw material to be used for new instantiations of objects. If recorded, the lifetime of the object can be archived and queried.

Spimes are not defined merely by these six technologies; rather, if these technologies converge within the manufacturing process then spimes could indeed arise. Due to physical limitations and cost-effectiveness, objects that perform similar functions to a spime but exist in a heterogeneous ecosystem where some of their spime-like functionality is performed by and/or shared with other entities may be precursors to spimes. For example, integrating a GPS receiver into every object is currently impractical because of size, power, and cost, among other reasons, but a base station that provides location services for one or many nearby devices may be more practical.

== See also ==
=== Similar terms ===
- Hyperlinked object
- Blogject
- Everyware

=== Related terms ===
- Internet of Things
- Digital twin
- Semantic Web
- Ambient intelligence
- Big data
- Machine-to-machine
- Web 2.0
- Cradle-to-cradle design
- Cyberspace
- Augmented reality
- Hyperreality
