= The Caryatids =

2009 novel by Bruce Sterling

- First edition
- Author: Bruce Sterling
- Cover artist: David Stevenson and Raphael Lacoste
- Language: English
- Genre: Science fiction
- Publisher: Del Rey Books
- Publication date: February 2009
- Publication place: United States
- Media type: Print (hardcover)
- Pages: 304
- ISBN: 978-0-345-46062-2
- OCLC: 232129415
- Dewey Decimal: 813/.54 22
- LC Class: PS3569.T3876 C37 2009

The Caryatids is a science fiction novel by American writer Bruce Sterling, published in 2009. It tells the tale of the four Mihajlovic "sisters", clones of the widow of a Balkan warlord now exiled to an orbital space station. From the viewpoint of a "Dispensation" entrepreneur from Los Angeles, the sisters, raised in an environment of ubiquitous computing, may succeed in rescuing the Earth from environmental collapse (see environmental degradation, ecological collapse, pollution, and other related concepts) in the year 2065.

The novel's locations include the Croatian island of Mljet, a Los Angeles threatened by a supervolcano, and the wastes of Central Asia.

== Release details ==
- The Caryatids. Del Rey Books. February 2009. ISBN 978-0-345-46062-2.
