= The Zenith Angle =

2004 novel by Bruce Sterling

- Author: Bruce Sterling
- Cover artist: David Stevenson
- Language: English
- Genre: Nowpunk
- Publisher: Del Rey Books
- Publication date: May 2004
- Publication place: United States
- Media type: Print (hardcover)
- Pages: 341
- ISBN: 0-345-46061-8 (Hardcover); ISBN 0-345-46865-1 (Paperback)
- OCLC: 54931711
- Dewey Decimal: 813/.54 22
- LC Class: PS3569.T3876 Z88 2004
- Preceded by: Zeitgeist
- Followed by: Visionary in Residence

The Zenith Angle is a science fiction novel by American writer Bruce Sterling, first published in 2004, about a pioneering expert in computer and network security with a traditional hacker personality named Derek Vandeveer. His life irrevocably changes after the September 11, 2001 attacks on the World Trade Center.

== Plot summary ==
Derek "Van" Vandeveer is a young, well-respected, computer scientist. He is rich with stock options, and heady with his own success. His whole world is suddenly and forever changed as the planes begin crashing into the World Trade Center. Within months, his fortune is gone (to an Enron-like scandal,) and his wife and son have moved west to work on a new telescope being developed by a billionaire entrepreneur.

Van is recruited into a nascent wing of the government, working on the outside of the main bureaucracy to vastly improve the security of government systems. His ingenious design gains him even more respect from his peers, but as the project continues Van goes through personality changes, becoming more paranoid and simultaneously more patriotic. Without the psychological aid of the money and nice house of his former company, he even begins to question whether he really is a computer scientist or just an over-glorified technician.

The novel comes to a head as Van is asked to look into the reason a multibillion-dollar pork project spy satellite is failing in space. The bureaucracy, thinking that he will fail in this endeavor, hopes to use it to discredit his boss and him and put an end to their power climb in Washington. Van discovers the problem and through a covert military-like attack on the source, puts an end to it.

== Themes ==
Bruce Sterling touches on many of his current interests during the course of this techno-thriller. Environmentally friendly design, the dot-com bomb, Bollywood, computer and network security, and the ubiquitous fiber-optic cable.
