= The Artificial Kid =

1980 novel by Bruce Sterling

- First edition (publ. Harper & Row); Cover art by Jim Cherry
- Author: Bruce Sterling
- Language: English
- Publisher: Harper & Row
- Publication date: 1980
- ISBN: 0-06-014098-4 (first edition)
- Dewey Decimal: 813.54
- LC Class: PS3569.T3876 A89

The Artificial Kid is a science fiction novel by American writer Bruce Sterling. It was originally published in 1980.

The Artificial Kid takes place on the planet Reverie, a world of coral continents, levitating islands, and the corrosive, transformative wilderness of "The Mass." Reverie has been transformed into a utopia/dystopia, with a stark class division. Arti, a heavily biologically modified boy from the Decriminalized Zone, becomes a pop star by selling videos of himself engaging in bloody combat with other fighters for the entertainment of the upper classes. When Reverie's founder, Moses Moses emerges from seven centuries of cryosleep, and Arti discovers an unpleasant secret about his past, both have to flee to escape from the powers of the "Cabal" that controls Reverie from behind the scenes.

== Reception ==
Dave Langford reviewed The Artificial Kid for White Dwarf #69, and stated that "Without being exactly convincing, it's lavishly exuberant in the way SF used to be and literate in the ways it wasn't."

== Reviews ==
- Review by John Shirley (1980) in Science Fiction Review, Winter 1980
- Review by Bob Mecoy (1980) in Future Life, November 1980
- Review by Christopher Priest (1981) in The Magazine of Fantasy & Science Fiction, May 1981
- Review [French] by Stéphane Nicot? (1982) in Fiction, #334
- Review [German] by Harald Pusch (1985) in Science Fiction Times, März 1985
- Review by Gregory Feeley (1986) in Foundation, #37 Autumn 1986
- Review by Don D'Ammassa (1988) in Science Fiction Chronicle, #100 January 1988
- Review [German] by Gregory Feeley (1991) in Das Science Fiction Jahr Ausgabe 1991
