= Polyorama Panoptique =

19th century optical toy

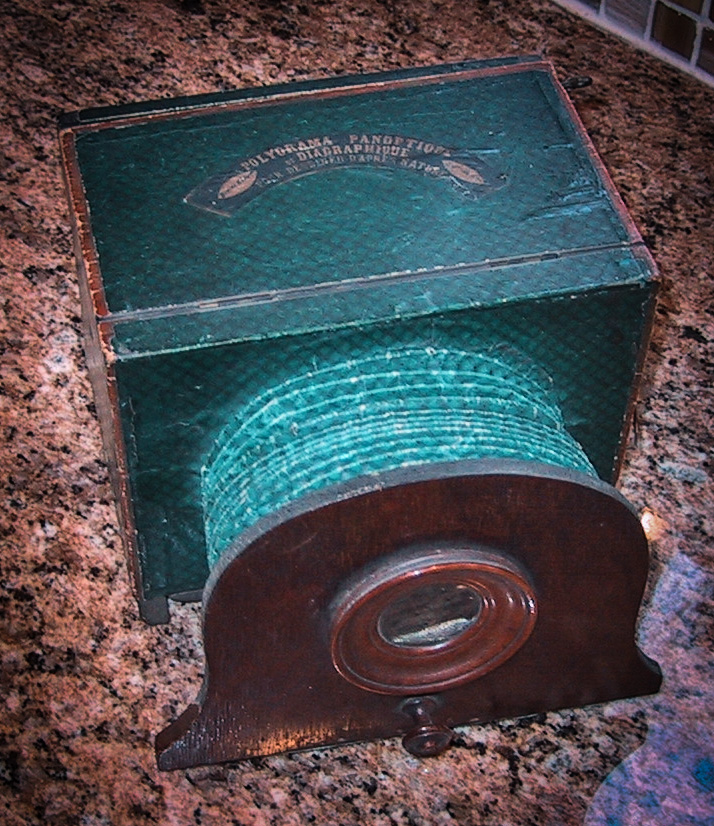
Polyrama Panoptique optical toy for viewing printed and painted cards. 19th century

A Polyrama Panoptique slide depicting Charing Cross, London, c. 1820-30. The windows and lanterns have been cut out to allow light to pass through

The Polyorama Panoptique was an optical toy popular from the 1820s through to the 1850s. It was invented by Pierre Seguin as development of the earlier "protean view". The device was based on Daguerre's Diorama, of which it was a small-scale and simplified version intended for domestic use. It consisted of a portable box-camera designed to take printed and painted cards.

The box was attached to a concertina device allowing for adjustment. This had an eye-sized viewing lens at the end that was not attached to the box. The illustration card would be inserted at the back of the box, which would be held up to the light. It would then be viewed through the lens. Most cards would be designed to include small cut-out parts through which the light would pass. Other parts of the cards may be made of thinner material to create a glowing effect. The empty parts would typically represent windows or street lights, so that the card's scene would appear to be illuminated by light from these sources.

The device also included separate doors at the back which allowed the user to control the degree and direction of light. Cards were designed to change appearance depending on which door was opened, so that a scene might appear to alter, for example, from a daytime to a nighttime view.
