= Mozart in Mirrorshades =

1985 short science fiction story by Bruce Sterling and Lewis Shiner

"Mozart in Mirrorshades" is a short science fiction story by Bruce Sterling and Lewis Shiner first published September 1985 in Omni. The story's protagonist is a man named Rice, who works for a company that obtains natural resources and valuable artifacts from alternate timelines created in the past (whenever one engages in time travel, a new timeline forms, making it impossible to alter the original history). The story centers around hostility from the people in the 18th-century timeline, who are angry about their exploitation and the effective robbery of their resources, land, and artwork; these alternate versions of our ancestors ultimately force the company to evacuate the timeline.

== Setting ==
The story is set in an alternate version of 1775 CE.

=== Politics and geography ===
The American Revolution has occurred, but it was carried out with the support of the company, which used it as an opportunity to establish a puppet government in North America. The French Revolution also occurred, prematurely, but was considerably "less messy": most aristocrats were either made to live normal lives or put to slave labor rather than guillotined, and parts of the monarchy's family were allowed to remain in the Palace of Versailles. (Louis XVI has happily become a full-time locksmith.) Due to the activities of the company (possibly global warming caused by their drilling for and use of fossil fuels), large portions of Florida have become submerged by the ocean. Salzburg, Austria, is the site of a large oil refinery and the main portal between this timeline and "Realtime".

=== Culture ===
Society has been heavily influenced by modern music, morals, and culture. Although individuals from alternate timelines are not generally allowed to immigrate to Realtime (this requires a "Green Card", which is granted very rarely), the inhabitants want anything that they can get that is modern. Various pieces of technology, and its products, such as electric automobiles, electric guitars, radios, drugs, et cetera have found their way into the alternate timeline, but they are not widely available. Groups of "gate people" form outside of company complexes begging for technology and medicine from the future. Rock music is broadcast for those with radios by the company's propaganda officer, and a 19-year-old Wolfgang Mozart begins a successful career as a rock star. "Quiche-to-go" stores have been opened in France, and Napoleon Bonaparte is mentioned "chewing Dubble Bubble in Corsica".

== Plot ==
The story is told in third person limited, with a man named Rice as the protagonist. After several years of work establishing the infrastructure to obtain oil and other resources for use in Realtime, he decides to leave the Realtime compounds and tour Salzburg. He quickly encounters a teenaged Mozart, whom he befriends and provides with advice and a job. Mozart invites Rice to a rock concert which he is giving, and Rice attends. After the concert is over, they begin discussing various topics, and Marie Antoinette is mentioned. After Rice tells him that she was decapitated in the original timeline by French revolutionaries, Mozart suggests that Rice go meet her, since he saved her life. At this point, Parker, the propaganda officer, arrives, along with a number of former ladies who are all hoping to seduce him to get a chance to "sleep in [his] clean sheets and raid his medicine cabinet" although Parker is "short, fat, and repulsive".

Rice decides to meet Marie Antoinette. The narration jumps forward a week, and resumes with them in bed together in Versailles palace after a week of "obsessive carnality". When she asks him about a leather bikini in an issue of Vogue, he pats her on the rear and tells her that she is with him now and can get what she wants. Rice reveals that he was supposed to have been back to work days ago. When "Toinette" asks whether he loves her, Rice answers: "Baby, I love the very idea of you."

At this point, Mozart, who has mysteriously obtained a communications job, calls Rice. He explains that there is serious trouble with native uprisings and that Rice is needed back. Rice and Marie begin to drive back towards Salzburg, and they have an argument because Rice is unable to obtain a Green Card for her. As a result, she lures him into a trap, and several Freemasons (who are coordinating much of the resistance) capture him and take him hostage.

After Rice is held captive for several hours in an isolated house, Jebe Noyon, a former Mongol warrior and member of the Grey Card Army (a Grey Card allows one to move between different branches of alternate history, but not enter Realtime), arrives. He uses modern weapons to quickly kill the Masons and rescue Rice. He conveys Rice back to the company's compound, where a battle is taking place between Grey Card soldiers and local troops; the casualty ratio strongly favors the company soldiers, but they are severely outnumbered and have received orders to abandon the timeline.

At this point, Marie Antoinette arrives, shouting angrily at Mozart, who had promised that if she led Rice into the trap, he would obtain a Green Card for her. Jebe punches her in the face and knocks her down. From this, Jebe realizes that Mozart had incited the Masons and given them information, and threatens to kill Mozart. Parker, the propaganda officer, casually kills Jebe, explaining that he could not risk anything happening to Mozart, whose music has reached number five on the Billboard charts. Rice becomes angry and shouts at Mozart that he can not use people like that, and that Realtime will punish him when they find out what he did. Parker considers this amusing, saying "We're talking Top of the Pops, here. Not some penny-ante refinery." Rice, stunned, grabs "Toinette" and follows Parker and Mozart through the time portal, abandoning that timeline.

== Reception ==
Coauthor Bruce Sterling described it as using "headlong energy" and "aggressive political satire".

Harry Turtledove and Martin H. Greenberg, editors of the short story collection The Best Alternate History Stories of the 20th Century, felt that it was of sufficient merit to include it in the anthology, which contained only 13 short stories.

William Gibson has referenced the story as a major influence on his novel The Peripheral.
