= Involution Ocean =

1977 science fiction novel by Bruce Sterling

First edition (publ. Jove Books)

Involution Ocean is a science-fiction novel by American writer Bruce Sterling, published in 1977.

== Plot summary ==
Involution Ocean is a novel about a drug addict who joins the crew of a whaling ship on the planet Nullaqua when the drug is outlawed, to get near the whales which are the source of the drug. The premise is influenced by Moby Dick by Herman Melville.

== Reception ==
Howard Thompson reviewed Involution Ocean in The Space Gamer No. 15. Thompson commented that "Sterling's plot and world hang together in believable fashion if you ignore science."

== Reviews ==
- Review by Larry Niven (1978) in Science Fiction Review, May 1978
- Review by Richard E. Geis (1978) in Science Fiction Review, July 1978
- Review by Tom Hosty (1979) in Foundation, #15 January 1979
- Review by Joseph Nicholas (1979) in Paperback Parlour, December 1979
- Review [French] by Roger Bozzetto (1980) in Fiction, #306
- Review [German] by Joachim Körber? (1981) in SF Perry Rhodan Magazin, 1/81
- Review [German] by Heinz J. Baldowé? (1981) in Science Fiction Times, #150 September/Oktober 1981
- Review [German] by uncredited (1982) in Reclams Science Fiction Führer
- Review by Martyn Taylor (1989) in Paperback Inferno, #77
- Review by Stephen E. Andrews and Nick Rennison (2006) in 100 Must-Read Science Fiction Novels
- Kliatt
