= Heavy Weather (Sterling novel) =

1994 novel by Bruce Sterling

- First edition
- Author: Bruce Sterling
- Cover artist: Jamie S. Warren Youll
- Language: English
- Genre: Science fiction
- Publisher: Bantam Spectra
- Publication date: September 1994
- Publication place: United States
- Media type: Print (hardback)
- Pages: 310
- ISBN: 0-553-09393-2
- OCLC: 30075317
- Dewey Decimal: 813/.54 20
- LC Class: PS3569.T3876 H4 1994

Heavy Weather is a science fiction novel by Bruce Sterling, first published in 1994, about a group of storm chasers in a world where global warming has produced incredibly destructive weather.

== Plot summary ==
Set in the year 2031, Heavy Weather depicts a world where mankind has unbalanced the world's ecosystem with their continuing production of greenhouse gases and unchecked expansion. As a result, the weather has become unpredictable and dangerous. Powerful storms routinely leave trails of devastation in their wake. Alex Unger, a young man suffering from numerous medical problems, is liberated from an illegal Mexican clinic by his sister Janey and brought back to America to her group of friends and colleagues, the Storm Troupe. The Troupe are dedicated and knowledgeable storm chasers who use high technology to document and research the weather, led by Janey's lover, the charismatic and brilliant scientist Jerry Mulcahey. They are preparing to meet an F-6, a storm of truly monstrous proportions.

The novel deals with scenarios directly extrapolated from emergent issues relevant to the time frame of its creation, such as antibiotic resistant disease, climate change, and social collapse due to monetary disintegration among others.
