= Taklamakan (short story) =

- Short story by Bruce Sterling
- Language: English
- Genre: Science fiction short story

Publication
- Publication date: 1998

"Taklamakan" is a short story by American writer Bruce Sterling. It was first published in the 1998 Oct/Nov volume of Asimov's Science Fiction.

== Plot ==
The story follows a government contracted spy and his rock climber coworker as they enter the Taklamakan Desert to explore and substantiate rumors about a group of Chinese habitats that simulate generation ships in a cave under the Taklamakan Desert.

== Reception ==
"Taklamakan" won the 1999 Hugo Award for Best Novelette as well as the 1999 Foreign Short Story Hayakawa Award.
