= Holy Fire (novel) =

1996 novel by Bruce Sterling

- First edition (UK)
- Author: Bruce Sterling
- Cover artist: Holly Warburton
- Language: English
- Genre: Science fiction
- Publisher: Orion (UK); Bantam Books (US)
- Publication date: June 1996 (UK); Sept 1996 (US)
- Publication place: United States
- Media type: Print (Hardcover & Paperback)
- Pages: 294
- ISBN: 0-553-09958-2
- OCLC: 34513313
- Dewey Decimal: 813/.54 20
- LC Class: PS3569.T3876 H6 1996

Holy Fire is a 1996 science fiction novel by American writer Bruce Sterling. It was nominated for the British Science Fiction Award in 1996, and for both the Hugo and Locus Awards in 1997.

Holy Fire is the story of an old woman who has gained a second youth—in a world in which radical life extension is available through highly intrusive technological means—and who has an ontological transformation as a result.
