= Riepl's law =

Hypothesis formulated by Wolfgang Riepl in 1913

Riepl's law is a hypothesis formulated by Wolfgang Riepl in 1913. It is frequently cited in discussions about newly emerging forms of media in the scientific community in German-speaking countries.

Riepl, the chief editor of Nuremberg's biggest newspaper at the time, stated in his dissertation about ancient modes of news communications (original title: "Das Nachrichtenwesen des Altertums mit besonderer Rücksicht auf die Römer") that new, further developed types of media never replace the existing modes of media and their usage patterns. Instead, a convergence takes place in their field, leading to a different way and field of use for these older forms.

This hypothesis is still considered to be relevant, explaining the fact that new media never make the "old" media disappear. The principal forms the basis for Niels Ole Finnemann's analyses of the five major matrices of media, stating "the general principles in the transition from one matrix to another as follows: The emergence of a new medium is accompanied by: a) a restructuring of the whole matrix implying b) a refunctionalisation of older media c) which often results in the development of new functions, eventually utilising hitherto un-used or even unknown qualities and functions of old media, — functions which may be as important as the new medium itself. E.g., the telegraph and innovation of print media: The telegraph allowed the transmission of news across a much wider space in a much shorter time, thereby also creating a platform for the development of a new print medium: printed newspapers. d) Finally we can also observe that new media often emerge because of information overload in older media."

Support for the continued validity of Riepl's law came from the highly regarded CEO of the Alex Springer publishing group Mathias Döpfner who, in May 2006 wrote in a leading German newspaper Die Welt

"I believe in Riepl's law...Books have not replaced storytelling. Newspapers have not replaced books; radio has not replaced newspapers; and television has not replaced radio. It follows that the Internet will not replace television or newspapers"

== Bibliography ==
- Riepl, Wolfgang (1913). "Das Nachrichtenwesen des Altertums mit besonderer Rücksicht auf die Römer", Leipzig: Teubner.
- Döpfner, Mathias "The Future of Journalism" Die Welt May 8, 2006.
- Finnemann, Niels Ole (2001) "The Internet - A new Communicational Infrastructure."Papers from The Centre for Internet Research, University of Aarhus ISSN 1601-538X (electronic version).
