= Cyberpunk derivatives =

Subgenres of the science fiction genre

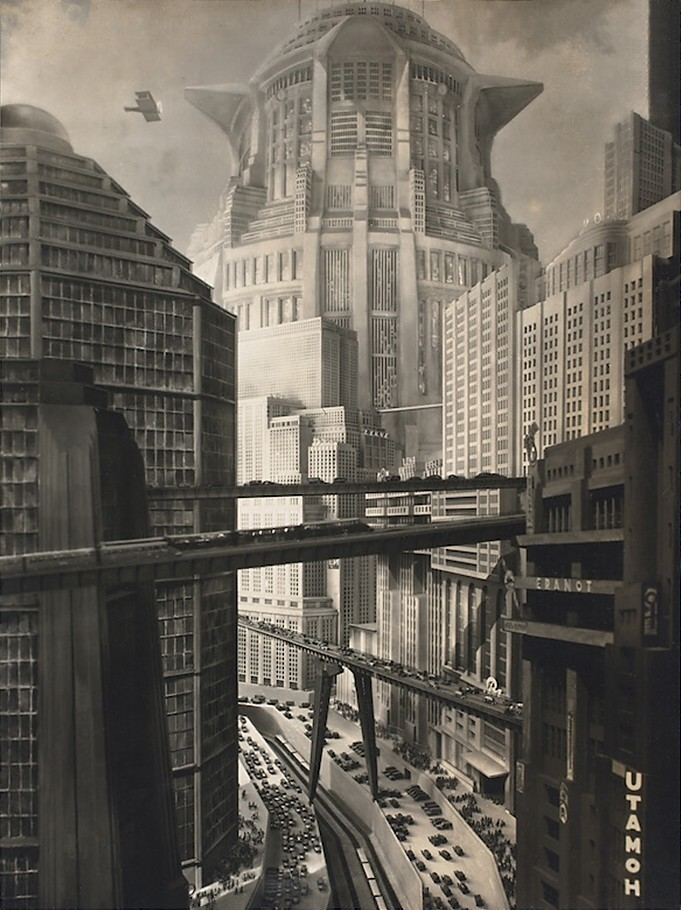
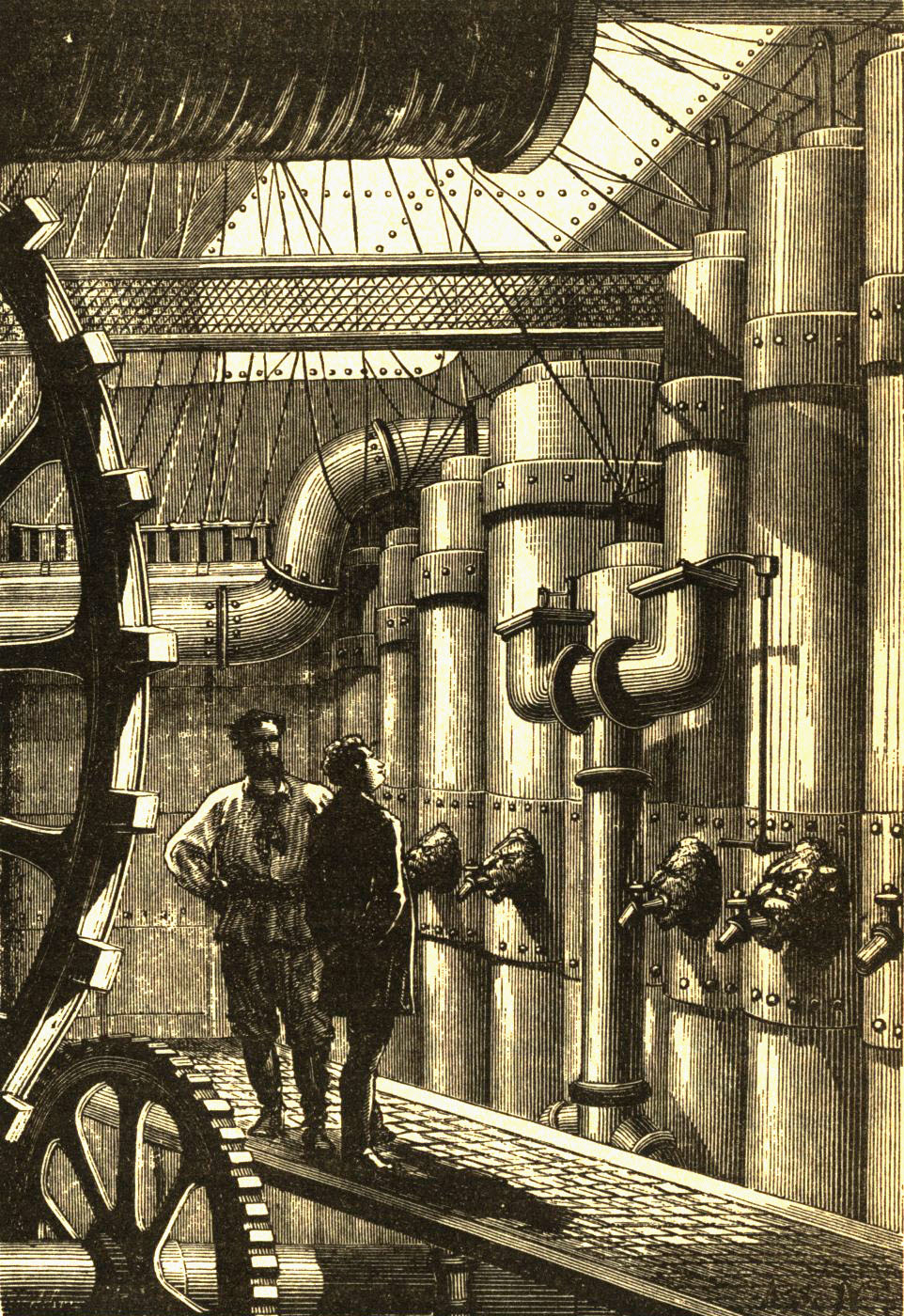
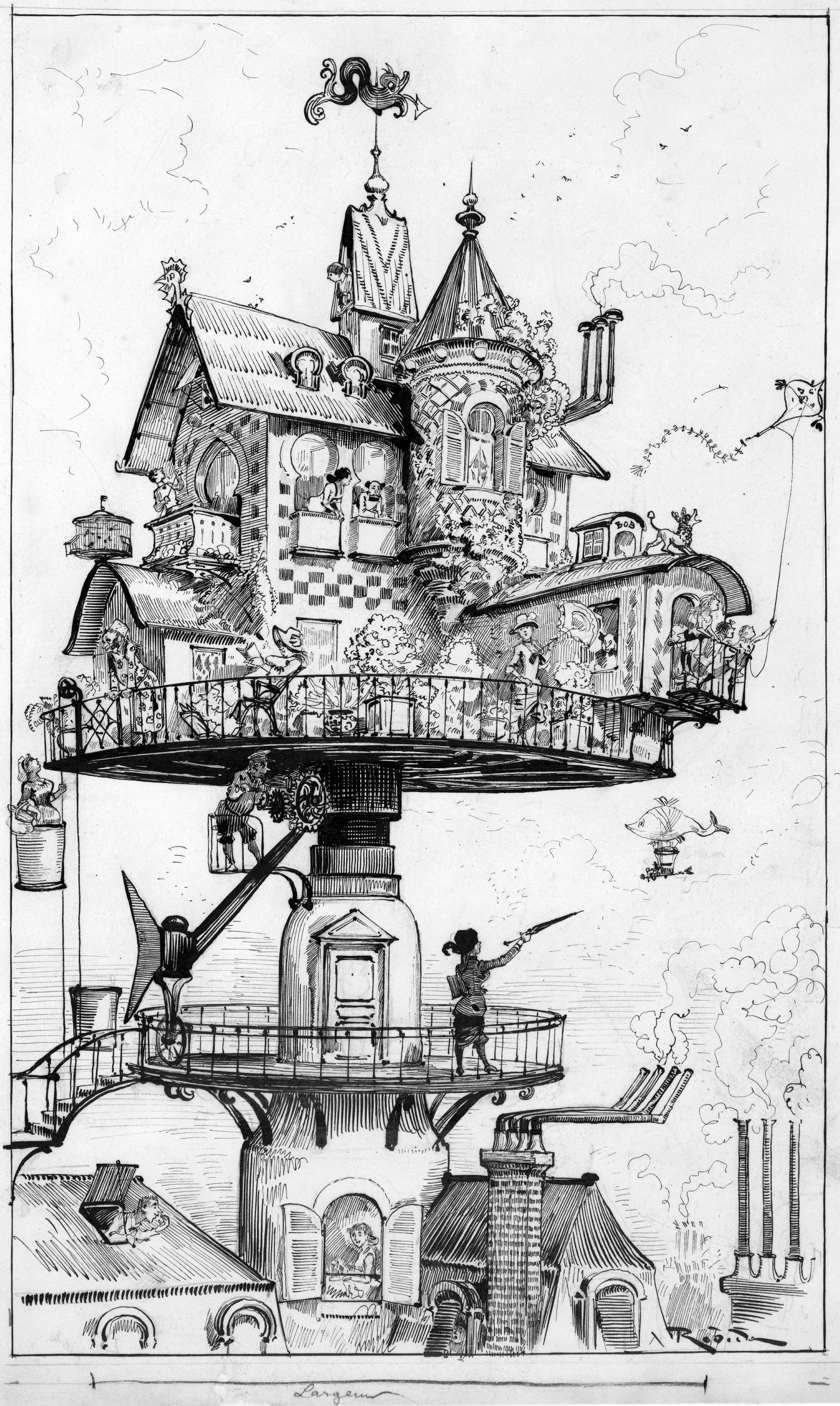
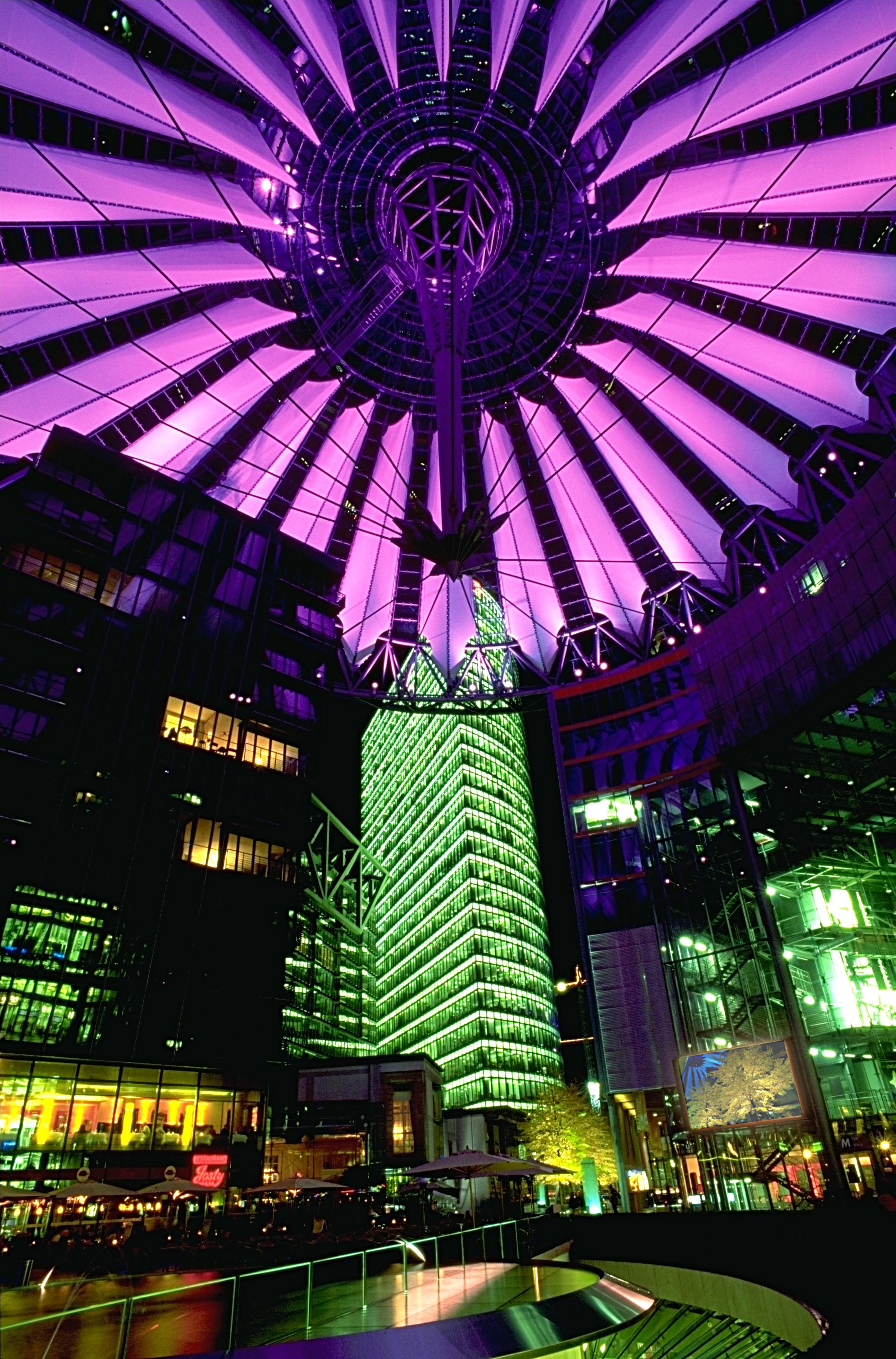
- Top left, example of decopunk: Scenic setting from the movie Metropolis (1927)
- Top right, example of oceanpunk: Illustration from the book Twenty Thousand Leagues Under the Seas (1870)
- Lower left, example of steampunk: Illustration from the book Le Vingtième siècle. La vie électrique (1890)
- Lower right, example of cyberpunk: Sony Center in Berlin, described by David Suzuki as having a cyberpunk aesthetic

Cyberpunk derivatives, variously also called literary punk genres, science fiction punk (sci-fi-punk), punk fiction, or punk-punk, are a collection of genres and subgenres in speculative fiction, science fiction, retrofuturism, aesthetics, and thereof, with the suffix -punk, collectively derived from the science fiction subgenre cyberpunk. In correspondence with cyberpunk, they are centered around visual worldbuilding, but, rather than necessarily sharing the digitally and mechanically focused setting of cyberpunk, these derivatives can display other qualities that are drawn from or analogous to cyberpunk. The basic idea is a focus on technology, usually a world built on one particular technology, where punk genres are really defined by taking the technology of a given time period, and stretching it to highly sophisticated, fantastical, or even anachronistic levels.

Akin to cyberpunk, transreal urbanism, or a particular approach to social stigma, have also been common, including elements of dystopia, rebellion, social alienation, societal collapse, and apocalypse, etc, with the main characters often being marginalized members of society, which ties into the original meaning of the word punk, but more recently, however, utopian themes have also become common.

Steampunk, one of the most well-known of these subgenres, has been defined as a "kind of technological fantasy;" others in this category sometimes also incorporate aspects of science fantasy and historical fantasy, leading to the gaslamp fantasy subgenre. Scholars have written of the stylistic place of these subgenres in postmodern literature, as well as their ambiguous interaction with the historical perspective of postcolonialism.

== Background ==
American author Bruce Bethke coined the term cyberpunk in his 1983 short story of that name, using it as a label for a generation of "punk" teenagers inspired by the perceptions inherent to the Information Age. The term was quickly appropriated as a label applied to the works of William Gibson, Bruce Sterling, John Shirley, Rudy Rucker, Michael Swanwick, Pat Cadigan, Lewis Shiner, Richard Kadrey, and others. Science fiction author Lawrence Person, in defining postcyberpunk, summarized the characteristics of cyberpunk:

Classic cyberpunk characters were marginalized, alienated loners who lived on the edge of society in generally dystopic futures where daily life was impacted by rapid technological change, an ubiquitous datasphere of computerized information, and invasive modification of the human body.

The cyberpunk style describes the nihilistic and underground side of the digital society that developed from the last two decades of the 20th century. The cyberpunk world is dystopian, that is, it is the antithesis of utopian visions, very frequent in science fiction produced in the mid-twentieth century, typified by the world of Star Trek, although incorporating some of these utopias. It is sometimes generically defined as "cyberpunk-fantasy" or "cyberfantasy" a work of a fantasy genre that concerns the internet or cyberspace. Among the best known exponents are commonly indicated William Gibson, for his highly innovative and distinctive stories and novels from a stylistic and thematic point of view, and Bruce Sterling, for theoretical elaboration. Sterling later defined cyberpunk as "a new type of integration. The overlapping of worlds that were formally separated: the realm of high tech and modern underground culture.

The relevance of cyberpunk as a genre to punk subculture is debatable and further hampered by the lack of a defined 'cyberpunk' subculture. Where the small 'cyber' movement shares themes with cyberpunk fiction, as well as drawing inspiration from punk and goth alike, cyberculture is considerably more popular though much less defined, encompassing virtual communities and cyberspace in general and typically embracing optimistic anticipations about the future. Cyberpunk is nonetheless regarded as a successful genre, as it ensnared many new readers and provided the sort of movement that postmodern literary critics found alluring. Furthermore, author David Brin argues, cyberpunk made science fiction more attractive and profitable for mainstream media and the visual arts in general.

== Futuristic derivatives ==
=== Biopunk ===
Biopunk builds on synthetic biology and biotechnology (such as bionanotechnology and biorobotics), typically focusing on the potential dangers to genetic engineering and enhancement. As such, this genre generally depicts near-future unintended consequences of the biotechnology revolution following the discovery of recombinant DNA.

Emerging during the 1990s, biopunk fiction usually describes the struggles of individuals or groups, often the product of human experimentation, against a backdrop of totalitarian governments or megacorporations that misuse biotechnologies as means of social control or profiteering.

As in postcyberpunk, individuals are most commonly modified and enhanced by genetic manipulation of their chromosomes rather than with prosthetic cyberware or dry nanotechnologies (albeit, like in nanopunk, bio-, nanotechnologies, and cyberware often coexist), and sometimes with other biotechnologies, such as nanobiotechnology, wetware, special bioengineered organs, and neural and tissue grafts.

Film examples include Naked Lunch (1991), Gattaca (1997), and Vesper (2022).

=== Cyber noir ===
Cyber noir is a noir genre story placed in a cyberpunk setting.

=== Nanopunk ===
Nanopunk focuses on worlds in which the theoretical possibilities of nanotechnology are a reality, including the use of Drexlerian 'dry' nano-assemblers and nanites.

It is an emerging subgenre that is still less common in comparison to other derivatives of cyberpunk. The genre is similar to biopunk, which focuses on the use of biotechnology, such as bionanotechnology and biorobotics, rather than on nanotechnology. (Albeit, like in biopunk, bio-, nanotechnologies, and cyberware often coexist in contrast to classical cyberpunk settings tending to heavily focus on mechanical cyberware to the point of genetic engineering and nanotechnologies being outright banned in some cyberpunk settings.)

One of the earliest works of nanopunk, Tech Heaven (1995) by Linda Nagata, looked into the healing potential of nanotechnology. The genre is often concerned with the artistic and physiological impact of nanotechnology, than of aspects of the technology itself. For instance, Prey (2002) by Michael Crichton explores a potential doomsday scenario caused by nanotechnology. One of the most prominent examples of nanopunk is the Crysis video game series; less famous examples include the television series Generator Rex (2010) and film Transcendence (2014).

=== Postcyberpunk ===
Postcyberpunk includes newer cyberpunk works that experiment with different approaches to the genre. Often, such works will keep to central futuristic elements of cyberpunk—such as human augmentation, ubiquitous infospheres, and other advanced technology—but will forgo the assumption of dystopia. However, like all categories discerned within science fiction, the boundaries of postcyberpunk are likely to be fluid or ill-defined.

It can be argued that the rise of cyberpunk fiction took place at a time when "cyber" was still considered new, foreign, and more-or-less strange to the average person. In this sense, postcyberpunk essentially emerged in acknowledgement of the idea that humanity has since adapted to the concept of cyberspace and no longer sees some elements of cyberpunk as from a distant world.

In addition to themes of its ancestral genre, according to Rafael Miranda Huereca (2011), postcyberpunk might also combine elements of nanopunk and biopunk. Some postcyberpunk settings can have diverse types of augmentations instead of focusing on one kind, while others, similar to classic cyberpunk, can revolve around a single type of technology like prosthetics, such as in Ghost in the Shell (GitS).

In television, Lawrence Person has called Ghost in the Shell: Stand Alone Complex "the most interesting, sustained postcyberpunk media work in existence".

In 2007, San Francisco writers James Patrick Kelly and John Kessel published Rewired: The Post-Cyberpunk Anthology.

==== Cyberprep ====
Cyberprep is a term with a similar meaning to postcyberpunk. A cyberprep world assumes that all the technological advancements of cyberpunk speculation have taken place, but life is utopian rather than gritty and dangerous. Since society is largely leisure-driven, advanced body enhancements are used for sports, pleasure, and self-improvement.

The word is an amalgam of the prefix cyber-, referring to cybernetics, and preppy, reflecting its divergence from the punk elements of cyberpunk.

== Retrofuturistic derivatives ==
As a wider variety of writers began to work with cyberpunk concepts, new subgenres of science fiction emerged, playing off the cyberpunk label, and focusing on technology and its social effects in different ways. Many derivatives of cyberpunk are retro-futuristic: they reimagine the past either through futuristic visions of historical eras (especially from the first and second industrial revolution technological-eras), or through depictions of more recent extrapolations or exaggerations of the actual technology from those eras.

=== Atompunk ===
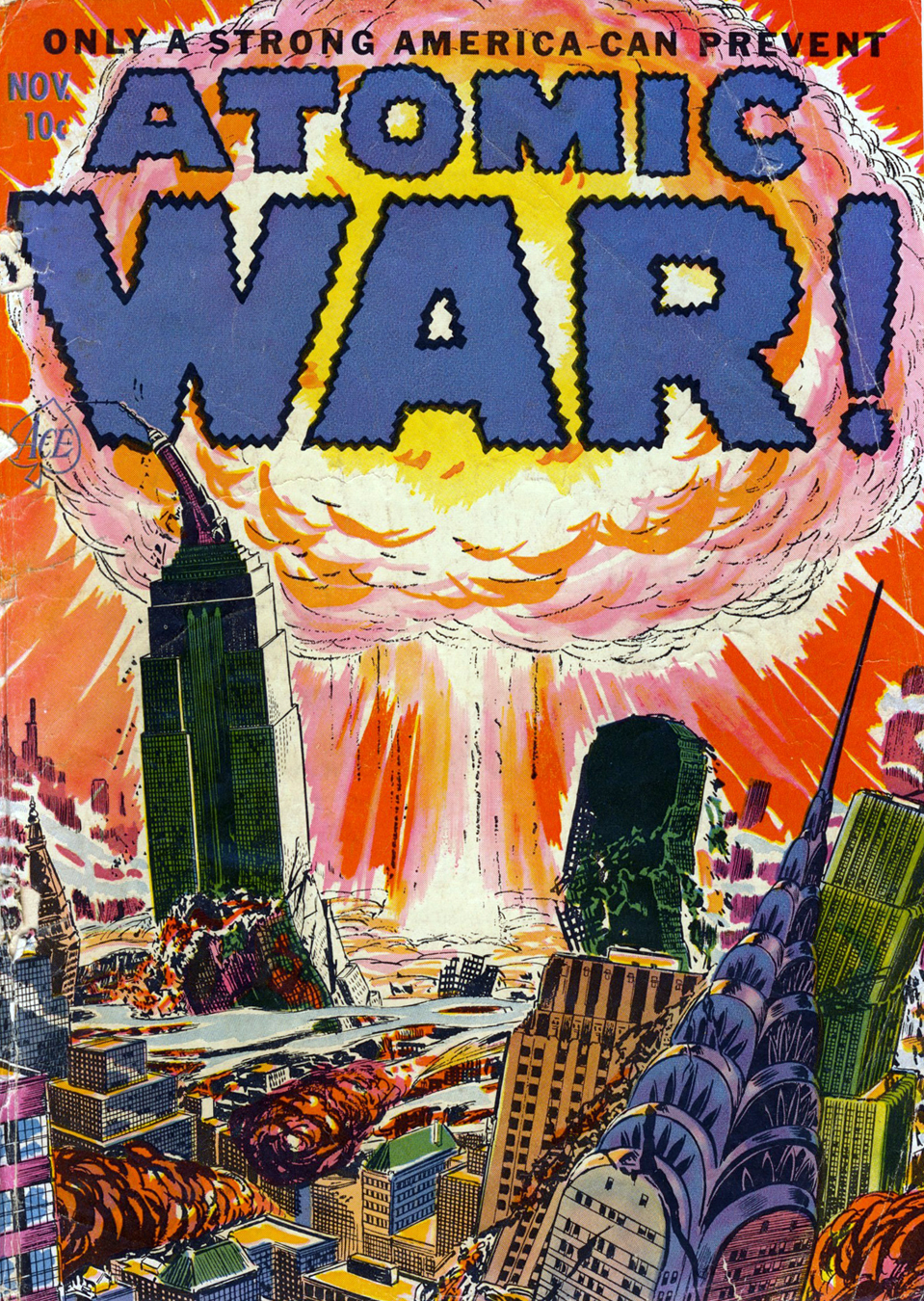
Cover of Atomic War number one, November 1952

Atompunk (also known as atomicpunk) relates to the pre-digital period of 1945–1969, including mid-century modernism; the Atomic, Jet, and Space Ages; communism, Neo-Soviet styling, and early Cold War espionage, along with anti-communist and Red Scare paranoia in the United States; British "Mod" culture; underground cinema; Googie architecture; Sputnik and the Space Race; silver age comic books and superhero fiction; and the rise of the American military–industrial complex.

Its aesthetic tends toward Populuxe and Raygun Gothic, which describe a retro-futuristic vision of the world. Most science fiction of the period carried an aesthetic that influenced or inspired later atompunk works. Some of these precursors to atompunk include 1950s science fiction films (including, but not limited to, B movies), the Sean Connery-era of the James Bond franchise, Dr. Strangelove, Star Trek, The Twilight Zone, The Outer Limits, The Avengers, early Doctor Who episodes, The Man from U.N.C.L.E., Batman, The Green Hornet, The Jetsons, Jonny Quest, Thunderbirds, Speed Racer, and some Silver Age comic books.

Notable examples of atompunk in popular media that have been released since the period include television series like Dexter's Laboratory, The Powerpuff Girls, Venture Bros, Archer, and the web series The Mercury Men; comic books like Ignition City and Atomic Age; films like Logan's Run (1976), The Incredibles (2004), The Iron Giant (1999), Indiana Jones and the Kingdom of the Crystal Skull (2008), The Man from U.N.C.L.E. (2015), X-Men: First Class (2011), and Men in Black 3 (2012); video games like Destroy All Humans! (2005), We Happy Few (2018), the Fallout series, Atomic Heart (2023), and The Invincible (2023); and books like Adam Christopher's novel The Age Atomic.

=== Clockpunk ===
Clockpunk, similar to steampunk, reimagines the Early Modern Period (16th–18th century) to include retro-futuristic technology, often portraying Renaissance-era science and technology based on clockwork, gears, and Da Vincian machinery designs. Such designs are in the vein of Mainspring by Jay Lake, and Whitechapel Gods by S. M. Peters.

The term was coined by the GURPS role-playing system in the sourcebook GURPS Steampunk Examples of clockpunk include The Blazing World by Margaret Cavendish; Astro-Knights Island in the nonlinear game Poptropica; the Clockwork Mansion level of Dishonored 2; the 2011 film version of The Three Musketeers; the TV series Da Vinci's Demons; as well as the video games Thief: The Dark Project, Syberia, and Assassin's Creed 2. Ian Tregillis' book The Mechanical is self-proclaimed clockpunk literature. The Games Workshop Warhammer Fantasy Battles settings, especially the Empire and the Dwarves, represent clockpunk.

For some, clockpunk is steampunk without steam.

Alita: Battle Angel (2019), based on the manga Battle Angel Alita, is mostly cyberpunk but sometimes its machines contain elements of clockpunk.

=== Dieselpunk ===
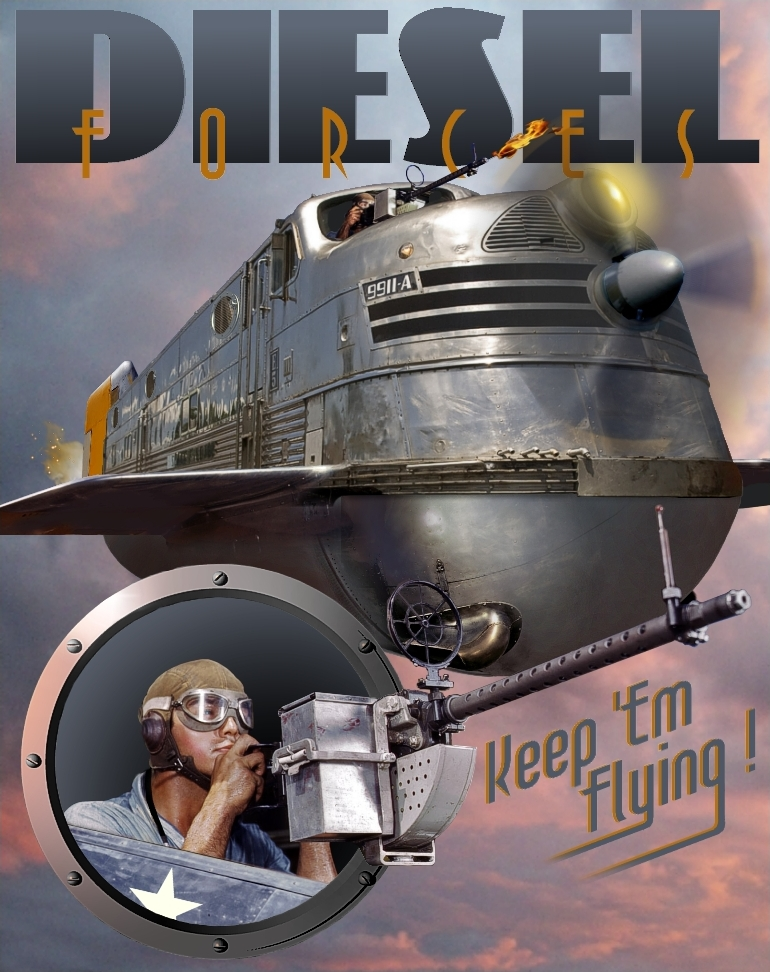
Dieselpunk

Dieselpunk is a genre and art style based on the aesthetics popular in the interwar period through the end of World War II into the 1950s, when diesel displaced the steam engine. The style combines the artistic and genre influences of the period (including pulp magazines, serial films, film noir, art deco, and wartime pin-ups) with retro-futuristic technology and postmodern sensibilities.

First coined in 2001 as a marketing term by game designer Lewis Pollak to describe his role-playing game Children of the Sun, dieselpunk has since grown to describe a distinct style of visual art, music, motion pictures, fiction, and engineering.

Examples include the movies Iron Sky (2012), Captain America: The First Avenger (2011), The Rocketeer (1991), K-20: Legend of the Mask (2008), Sky Captain and the World of Tomorrow (2004), and Dark City (1998); video games such as the Crimson Skies series, the Fallout series, Greed Corp, Team Fortress 2, Gatling Gears, Skullgirls, the Wolfenstein series, Iron Harvest, Final Fantasy VII and the Benoît Sokal created games Amerzone, Syberia and Paradise all use the dieselpunk aesthetic and machines.; and television shows like The Legend of Korra.

==== Decopunk ====
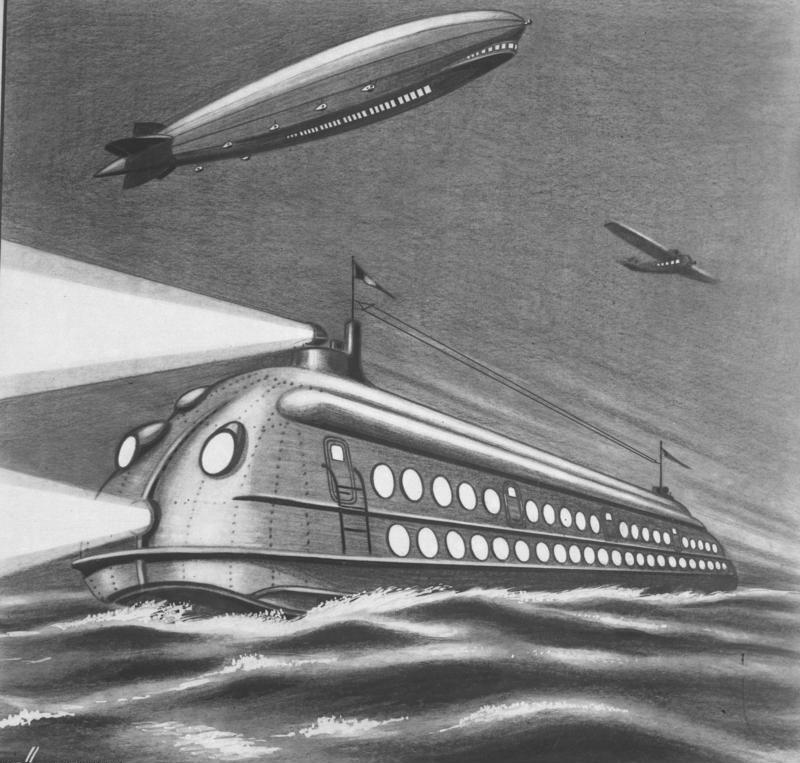
German 1930s speculative art of an Ocean liner in the year 2000

Decopunk is a recent subset of dieselpunk, centered around the art deco and Streamline Moderne art styles. Other influences include the 1927 film Metropolis as well as the environment of American cities like New York, Chicago, and Boston around the period between the 1920s and 1950s.

Steampunk author Sara M. Harvey made the distinction that decopunk is "shinier than dieselpunk;" more specifically, dieselpunk is "a gritty version of steampunk set in the 1920s–1950s" (i.e., the war eras), whereas decopunk "is the sleek, shiny very art deco version; same time period, but everything is chrome!"

Possibly the most notable examples of this genre are games like the first two titles in the BioShock series and Skullgirls; films like Batman (1989), Dick Tracy (1990), The Rocketeer (1991), The Shadow (1994), and Dark City (1998); comic books like The Goon; and the cartoon Batman: The Animated Series, which included neo-noir elements along with modern elements such as the use of VHS cassettes.

=== Sandalpunk ===
Sandalpunk or Bronzepunk is science-fiction punk inspired by the societies and empires of the Bronze Age and Iron Age, taking the technology of the ancient classic world (the time of Plato and Aristotle) and builds a retrofuturistic world with it. It blends speculative continuity and technological anachronism, imagining worlds where empires like Rome, Mycenae, Ancient Athens, the Hittites, Ancient Egypt, and the like, never collapsed, instead evolving into futuristic superpowers while preserving their ancient cultural identity.

Notable examples of sandal punk media includes, movies, such as: the 1963 movie Jason and the Argonauts, Disney's 2001 movie Atlantis: The Lost Empire, Dreamworks' 2003 film Sinbad: Legend of the Seven Seas, Zack Snyder's 2006 film 300, the 2016 movie Gods of Egypt; video games, such as: God of War, God of War II, and God of War III (2005–2010), Ubisoft's 2018 video game Assassin's Creed Odyssey; and books, such as: various books based on Doctor Who, among many others.

=== Steampunk ===
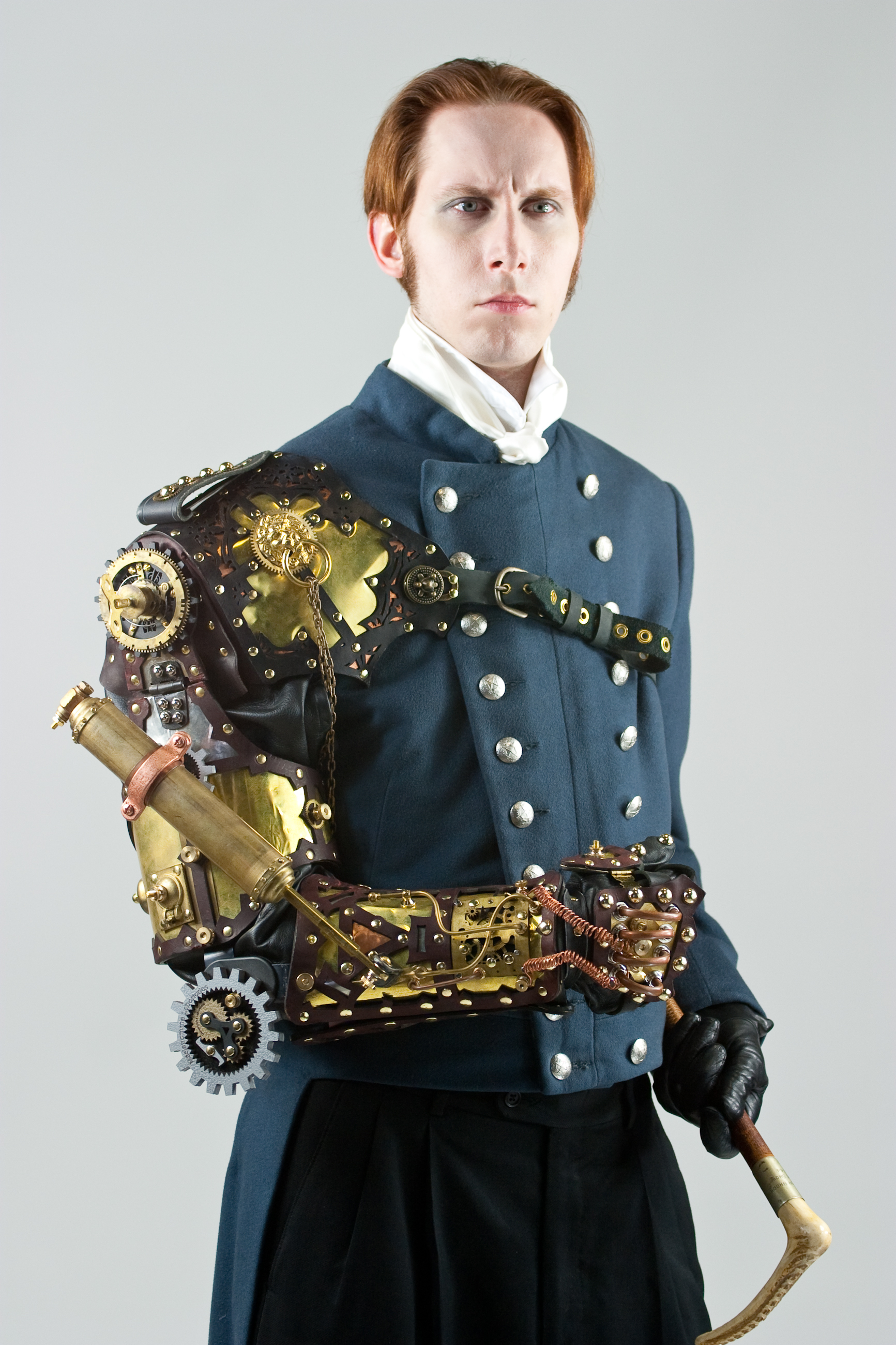
Victorian-style attire with a steampunk mechanical arm

Steampunk is a retro-futuristic genre that is influenced by the Steam Age, ranging from the late Regency era (1795–1837; when the Industrial Revolution began) through the Victorian era (1837–1901) and the Belle Époque (1871–1914).

The word steampunk was invented in 1987 as a jocular reference to some of the novels of Tim Powers, James P. Blaylock, and K. W. Jeter. When Gibson and Sterling entered the subgenre with their 1990 collaborative novel The Difference Engine, the term was being used earnestly as well. Alan Moore and Kevin O'Neill's 1999 The League of Extraordinary Gentlemen historical fantasy comic book series (and the subsequent 2003 film adaptation) popularized the steampunk genre and helped propel it into mainstream fiction. Around 2007, the term became more common, and also began to refer to a clothing style and subculture.

The most immediate form of steampunk subculture is the community of fans surrounding the genre. Others move beyond this, attempting to adopt a "steampunk" aesthetic through fashion, home decor and even music. This movement may also be (perhaps more accurately) described as "Neo-Victorianism", which is the amalgamation of Victorian aesthetic principles with modern sensibilities and technologies. This characteristic is particularly evident in steampunk fashion which tends to synthesize punk, goth and rivet styles as filtered through the Victorian era. As an object style, steampunk adopts more distinct characteristics with various craftspersons modding modern-day devices into a pseudo-Victorian mechanical "steampunk" style. The goal of such redesigns is to employ appropriate materials (such as polished brass, iron, and wood) with design elements and craftsmanship consistent with the Victorian era.

Other examples include Wild Wild West (1999), Hugo (2011), Treasure Planet (2002), Last Exile (2003), Bioshock Infinite (2013), Mortal Engines (2018) and Arcane (2021).

== Other proposed science fiction derivatives ==
There have been a handful of divergent terms based on the general concepts of steampunk. These are typically considered unofficial and are often invented by readers, or by authors referring to their own works, often humorously.

For instance, Bruce Sterling described his 2004 novel The Zenith Angle, which follows the story of a hacker whose life is changed by the September 11 attacks, as "nowpunk". The developers of the computer game Neo Cab used the same term to describe themselves. Another example is "Rococopunk", a combination of Rococo and punk clothing in cosplay or theatrical costuming. Also, the term "Stonepunk" has been used to refer to settings based in which characters use Neolithic technology, such as the 2017 videogame Horizon Zero Dawn. The term "NASApunk" was coined by Todd Howard to describe the visual aesthetic of the game Starfield, which is inspired by real-world technology such as that used by NASA.

A large number of terms have been used by the GURPS roleplaying game Steampunk to describe anachronistic technologies and settings, including clockpunk (Renaissance tech), and transistorpunk (Atomic-Age tech)—the latter is analogous to atompunk. These terms have seen very little use outside GURPS.

=== Chempunk ===
Chempunk was a term coined for the 2012 Polish novel Alkaloid. It describes speculative fiction in which chemistry – rather than steam power or digital technology – drives technological, biological and social change.

=== Lunarpunk ===
Lunarpunk is a subgenre of solarpunk with a darker aesthetic. It leans toward fantasy and its themes include night settings – often featuring bioluminescence and purple colors, spirituality or the occult, green cities, sustainable technologies, and a more introspective side of solarpunk utopias.

=== Raypunk ===
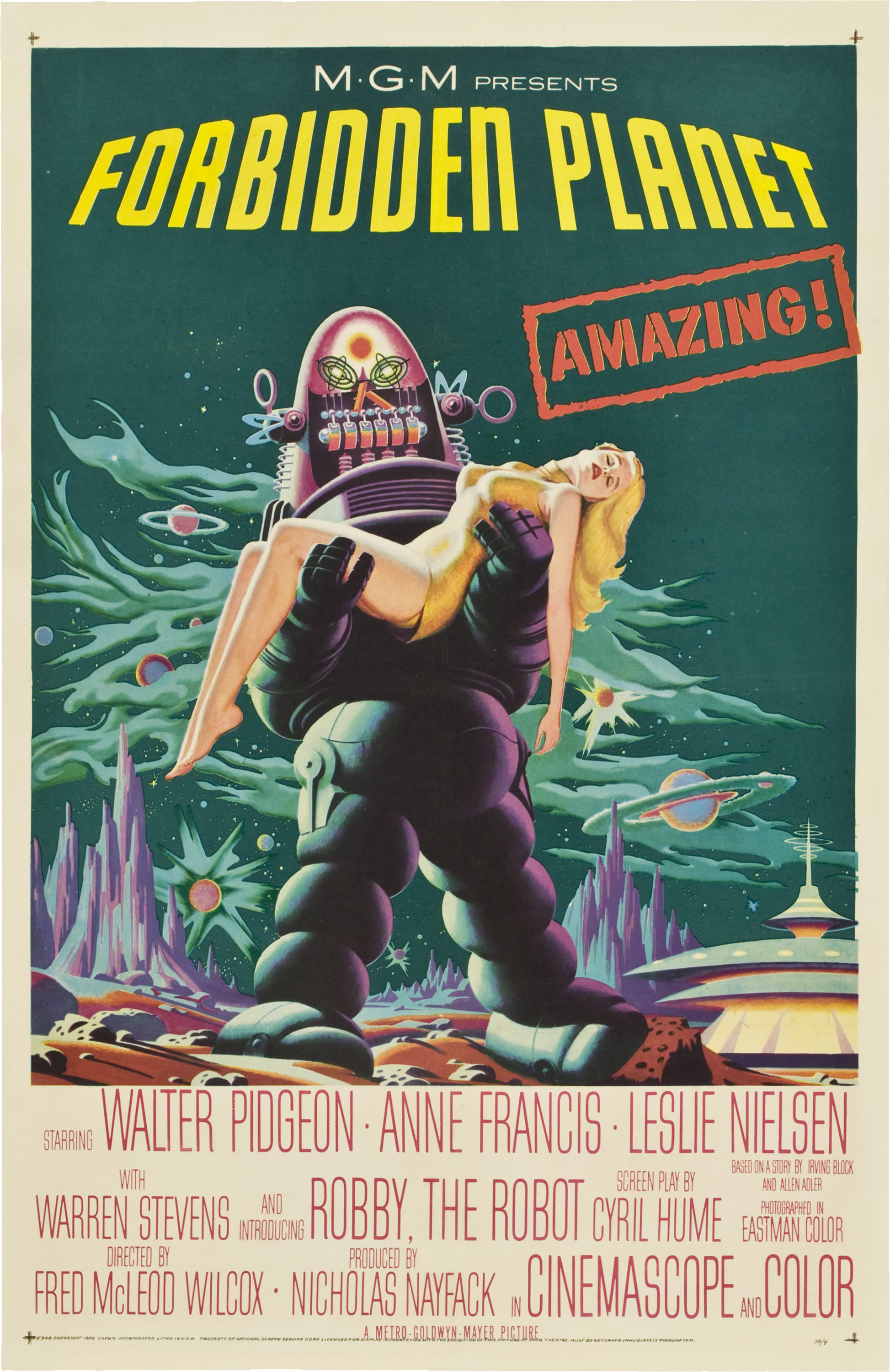
Forbidden planet (1956)

Raypunk, derived from Raygun Gothic, is a distinctive (sub)genre that deals with scenarios, technologies, beings or environments, very different from everything that is known or what is possible here on Earth or by science. It covers space surrealism, parallel worlds, alien art, technological psychedelia, non-standard "science", alternative or distorted/twisted reality, and so on.

It is a predecessor to atompunk with similar "cosmic" themes, but mostly without explicit nuclear power or definitive technology. It is also distinct in that it has more archaic/schematic/artistic style, and that its atmosphere is more dark, obscure, cheesy, weird, mysterious, dreamy, hazy, or etheric (origins before 1880–1950), parallel to steampunk and dieselpunk.

=== Solarpunk ===
Solarpunk is a movement, a subgenre, and an alternative to cyberpunk fiction that encourages optimistic envisioning of the future in light of present environmental concerns, such as climate change and pollution, as well as concerns of social inequality. Solarpunk fiction imagines futures that address environmental concerns with varying degrees of optimism.

== See also ==
- Mythpunk, a subgenre of mythic fiction
- Urban fantasy, sometimes referred to as elfpunk
