= Cheap Truth =

Sci-fi fanzine

Cheap Truth was a free series of one-page, double-sided newsletters (i.e., fanzine) published in the period between 1983 and 1986. Its headquarters was in Austin, Texas. It was not-copyrighted and explicitly encouraged "xerox pirates" to circulate the zine for their own monetary gain or otherwise. It was the unofficial organ of a loose group of authors. This group called themselves many things, including "The Movement" but was later known as the Cyberpunk movement.

The zine was edited by the American science fiction author Bruce Sterling under the alias Vincent Omniaveritas (as in vincit omnia veritas). There were several contributors such as "Sue Denim" (as in pseu-donym, in this case Lewis Shiner), but the real identities behind some aliases are still not commonly known. The newsletter was critical towards what its editors regarded, at the time, as the "stagnant state of popular science fiction".
