= Christopher Brown (author) =

American writer

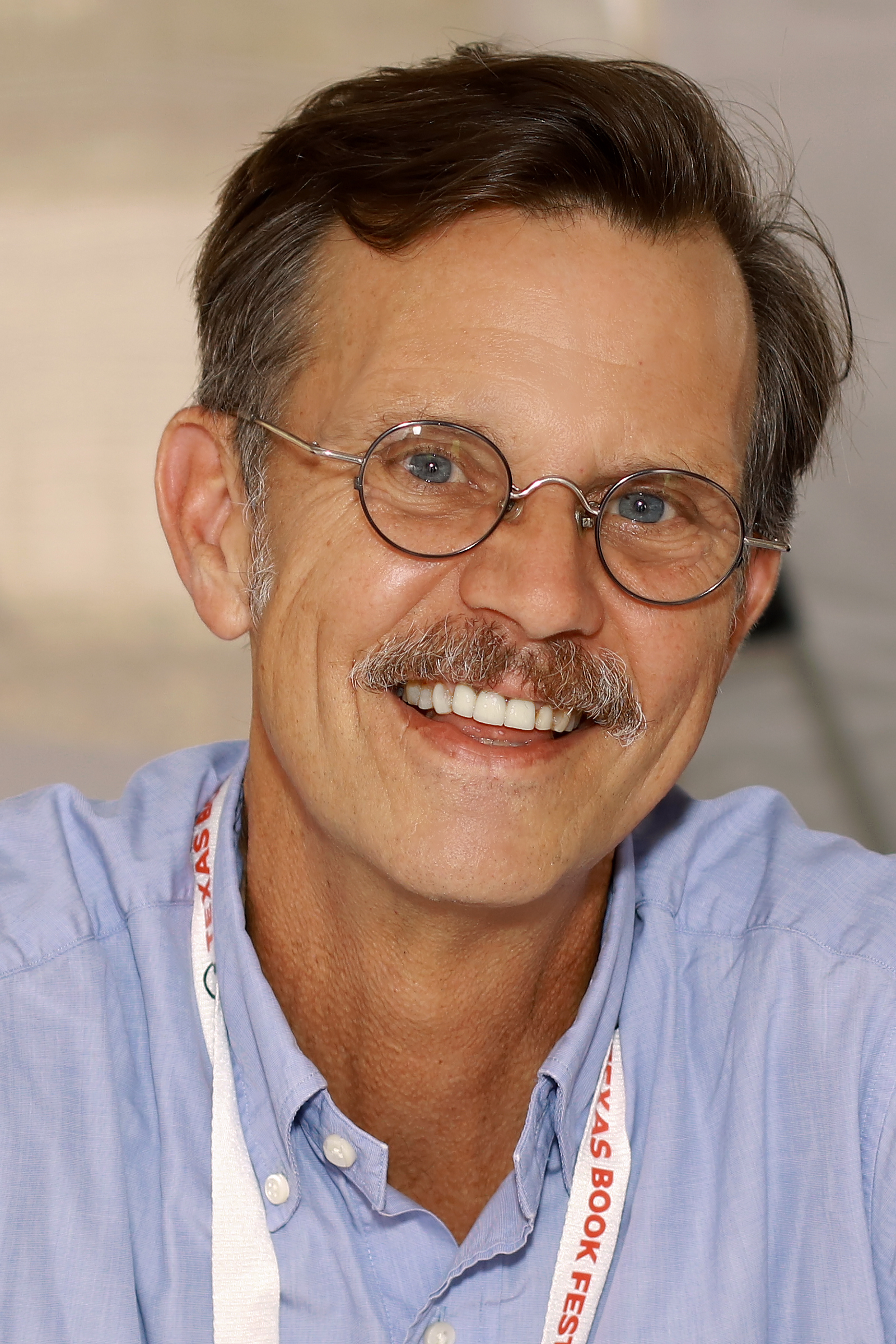
- Brown at the 2024 Texas Book Festival

Website
- christopherbrown.com

Christopher Brown is an American author, who is known for writing science fiction and nature-focused nonfiction.

His first novel, Tropic of Kansas, was published in 2017 by Harper Voyager, and was a finalist for the 2018 John W. Campbell Memorial Award for Best Science Fiction Novel of the year. Tropic of Kansas tells the story of a brother and sister traveling across an ecologically damaged United States during a period of political unrest.

His work frequently focuses on issues at the nexus of technology, politics, economics and ecology. His short fiction and criticism have been published in a variety of anthologies and magazines, including MIT Technology Review’s Twelve Tomorrows, LitHub, Tor.com, Reckoning, and The Baffler.

He was a 2013 World Fantasy Award nominee for the anthology he co-edited, Three Messages and a Warning: Contemporary Mexican Short Stories of the Fantastic.

His novel Rule of Capture, a speculative legal thriller about a lawyer defending an accused eco-terrorist, was published by Harper Voyager in 2019. The sequel, Failed State, follows the further escapades of defense lawyer Donny Kimoe as he appears before a post-revolutionary truth and reconciliation tribunal, and was nominated for the 2021 Philip K. Dick Award.

In 2020 Brown began writing a weekly newsletter about urban nature and wildlife, Field Notes, and his new narrative nonfiction book drawing on the same material, A Natural History of Empty Lots: Field Notes from Urban Edgelands, Back Alleys and other Wild Places, is slated for publication by Timber Press in September 2024.

Before 2012, Brown wrote under the name Chris Nakashima-Brown.

Brown lives in Austin, Texas, where he is a member of the Turkey City Writer's Workshop and also practices technology law.
