= Bruce Sterling =

American author, speaker and futurist (born 1954)

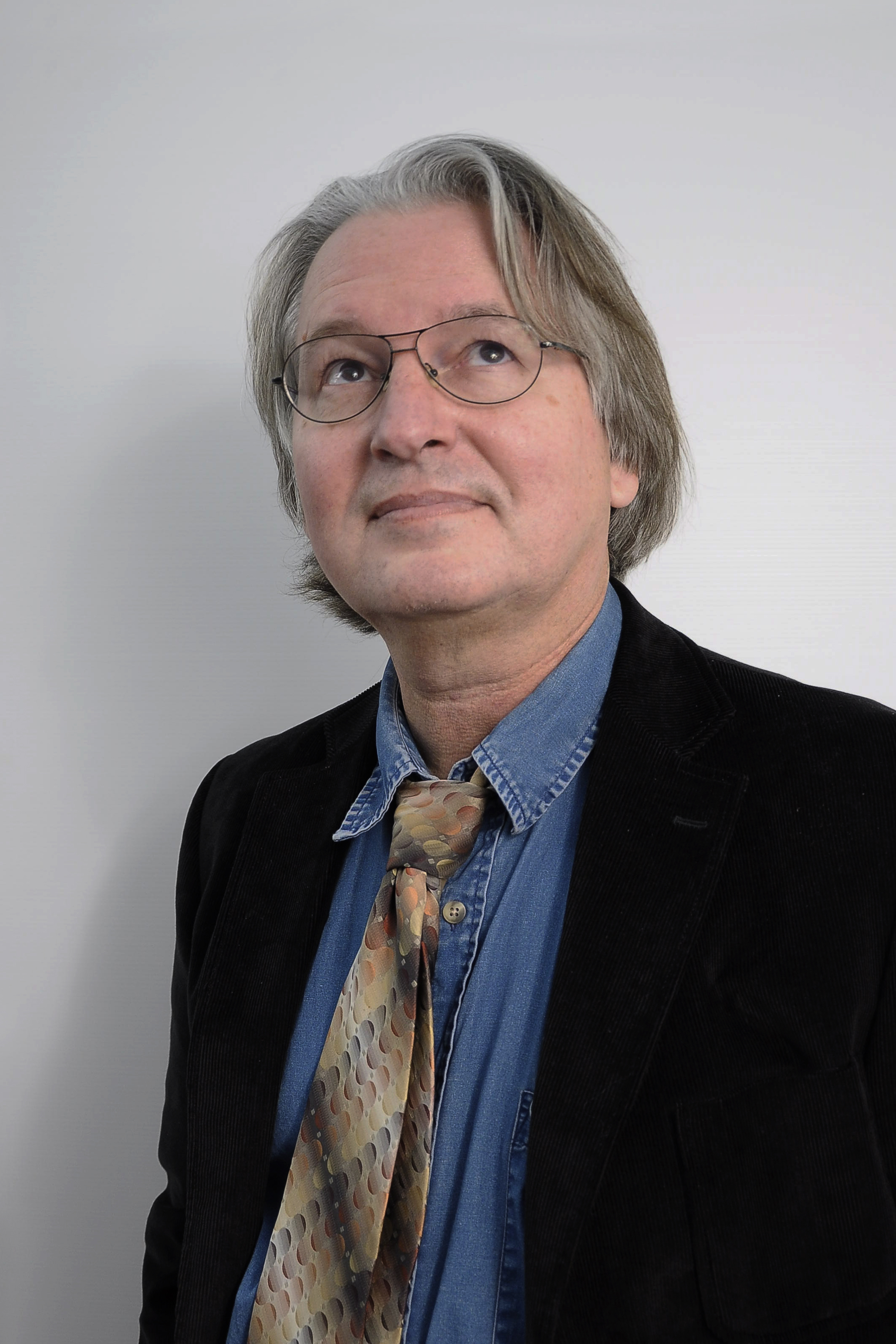
- Sterling in 2011
- Born: Michael Bruce Sterling; April 14, 1954 (age 72); Brownsville, Texas, U.S.
- Education: University of Texas at Austin (BA)
- Occupations: Writer; speaker; futurist; design instructor
- Spouse: Jasmina Tešanović (m. 2005)
- Writing career
- Pen name: Vincent Omniaveritas (in fanzine Cheap Truth)
- Period: 1970s–present
- Genre: Science fiction
- Subject: Cyberpunk
- Movement: Cyberpunk/postcyberpunk

Signature
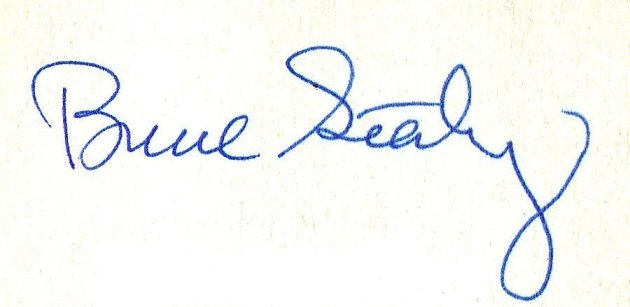

Michael Bruce Sterling (born April 14, 1954) is an American science fiction author known for his novels and short fiction and editorship of the Mirrorshades anthology. In particular, he is linked to the cyberpunk subgenre.

Sterling's first science-fiction story, "Man-Made Self", was sold in 1976. He is the author of science-fiction novels, including Schismatrix (1985), Islands in the Net (1988), and Heavy Weather (1994). In 1992, he published his first non-fiction book, The Hacker Crackdown: Law and Disorder on the Electronic Frontier.

He has been interviewed for documentaries such as Freedom Downtime, TechnoCalyps and Traceroute.

== Writing ==
Sterling is one of the founders of the cyberpunk movement in science fiction, along with William Gibson, Rudy Rucker, John Shirley, Lewis Shiner, and Pat Cadigan. In addition, he is one of the subgenre's chief ideological promulgators. This has earned him the nickname "Chairman Bruce". He was also one of the first organizers of the Turkey City Writer's Workshop, and is a frequent attendee at the Sycamore Hill Writer's Workshop. He won Hugo Awards for his novelettes "Bicycle Repairman" (1996) and "Taklamakan" (1998). His first novel, Involution Ocean (1977), features the world Nullaqua where all the atmosphere is contained in a single, miles-deep crater. The story concerns a ship sailing on the ocean of dust at the bottom and hunting creatures called dustwhales. It is partially a science-fictional pastiche of Moby-Dick by Herman Melville.

In the early 1980s, Sterling wrote a series of stories set in the Shaper/Mechanist universe: the Solar System is colonized, with two major warring factions. The Mechanists use a great deal of computer-based mechanical technologies; the Shapers do genetic engineering on a massive scale. The situation is complicated by the eventual contact with alien civilizations; humanity eventually splits into many subspecies, with the implication that some of these vanish from the galaxy, reminiscent of the singularity in the works of Vernor Vinge. The Shaper/Mechanist stories can be found in the collections Crystal Express and Schismatrix Plus, which contains the novel Schismatrix and all of the stories set in the Shaper/Mechanist universe. Alastair Reynolds identified Schismatrix and the other Shaper/Mechanist stories as one of the greatest influences on his own work.

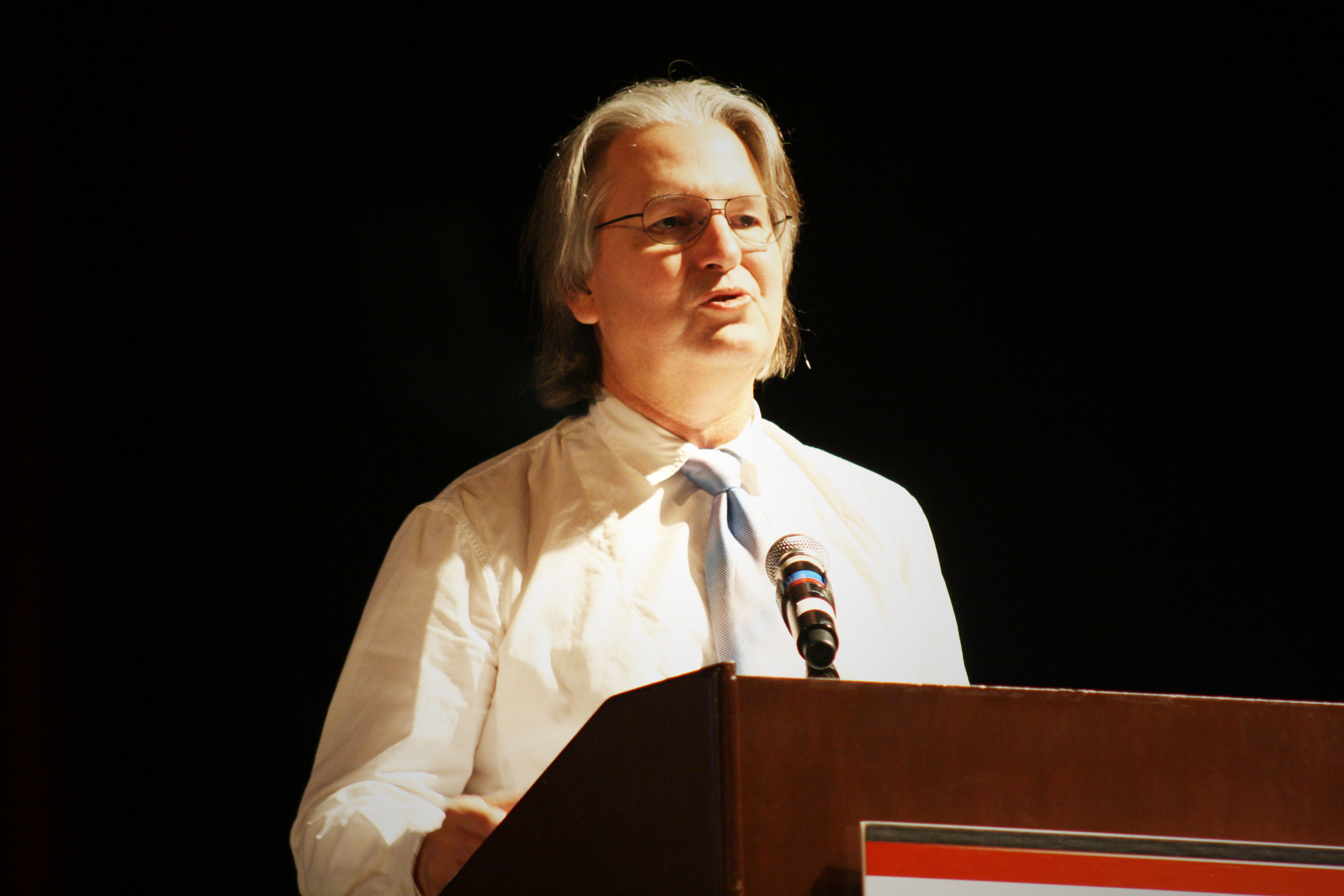
Sterling at the 2010 Augmented Reality Event

In the 1980s, Sterling edited the science fiction critical fanzine Cheap Truth under the alias of Vincent Omniaveritas. He wrote a column called Catscan for the now-defunct science fiction critical magazine SF Eye. He contributed a chapter to Sound Unbound: Sampling Digital Music and Culture (MIT Press, 2008) edited by Paul D. Miller, a.k.a. DJ Spooky. From April 2009 through May 2009, he was an editor at Cool Tools.

From October 2003 to May 2020 Sterling blogged at "Beyond the Beyond", which was hosted by Wired until the COVID-19 pandemic led Condé Nast to cut back because of an advertising slump. He also contributed to other print and online platforms, including The Magazine of Fantasy & Science Fiction.

=== Writing projects ===
He has been the instigator of three projects which can be found on the Web:

- The Dead Media Project: A collection of "research notes" on dead media technologies, from Incan quipus, through Victorian phenakistoscopes, to the departed video game and home computers of the 1980s. The Project's homepage, including Sterling's original Dead Media Manifesto can be found at deadmedia.org.
- The Viridian Design Movement: His attempt to create a "green" design movement focused on high-tech, stylish, and ecologically sound design. The Viridian Design home page, including Sterling's Viridian Manifesto and all of his Viridian Notes, is managed by Jon Lebkowsky. The Viridian Movement helped to spawn a popular "bright green" environmental weblog Worldchanging. WorldChanging contributors include many of the original members of the Viridian "curia".
- Embrace the Decay: A web-only art piece commissioned by the Los Angeles Museum of Contemporary Art (MOCA) in 2003. Incorporating contributions solicited through The Viridian Design 'movement', Embrace the Decay was the most visited piece/page at LA MOCA's Digital Gallery, and included contributions from Jared Tarbell of levitated.net and co-author of several books on advanced Flash programming, and Monty Zukowski, creator of the winning 'decay algorithm' sponsored by Sterling.

=== Neologisms ===
Sterling has coined various neologisms to describe things that he believes will be common in the future, especially items which already exist in limited numbers.

- In the December 2005 issue of Wired magazine, Sterling coined the term buckyjunk to refer to future, difficult-to-recycle consumer waste made of carbon nanotubes, a.k.a. buckytubes, based on buckyballs or buckminsterfullerene.
- In his 2005 book Shaping Things, he coined the term design fiction which refers to a type of speculative design which focuses on worldbuilding.
- In July 1989, in SF Eye #5, he was the first to use the word "slipstream" to refer to a type of speculative fiction between traditional science fiction and fantasy and mainstream literature.
- In August 2004, he suggested a type of technological device (he called it "spime") that, through pervasive RFID and GPS tracking, can track its history of use and interact with the world.

== Bibliography ==
Sterling's novels include:

- Involution Ocean (1977)
- The Artificial Kid (1980)
- Schismatrix (1985)
- Islands in the Net (1988)
- The Difference Engine (1990; with William Gibson)
- Heavy Weather (1994)
- Holy Fire (1996)
- The Zenith Angle (2004)
- The Caryatids (2009)
- Love Is Strange (2012)

== Personal life ==
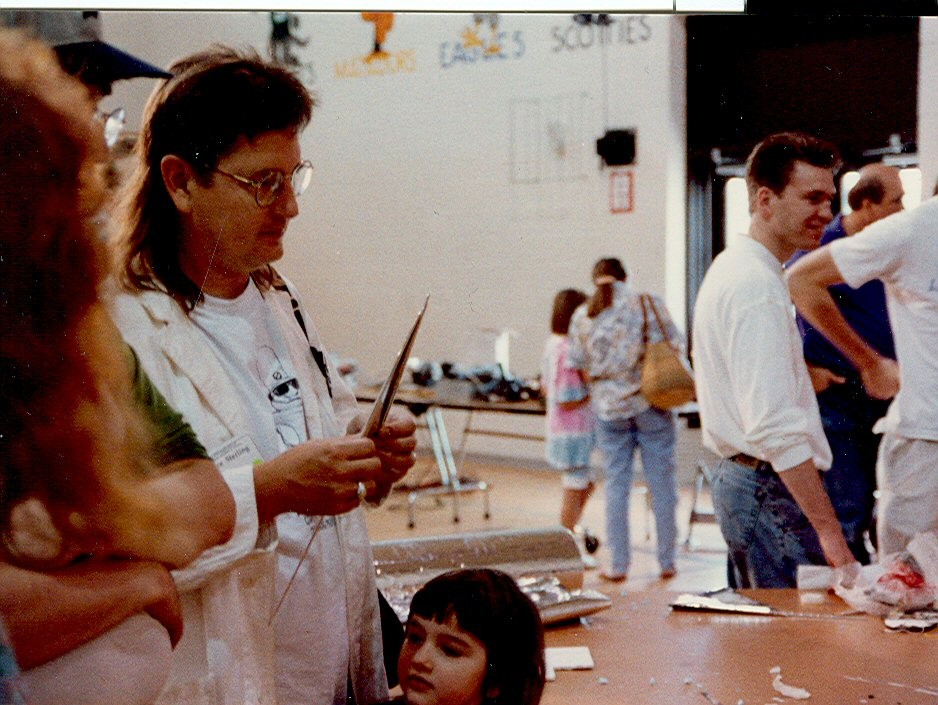
Sterling at Robofest '94

In the beginning of his childhood he lived in Galveston, Texas until his family moved to India. Sterling spent several years in India and has a fondness for Bollywood films. In 1976, he graduated from the University of Texas with a degree in journalism. In 1978, he was the Dungeon Master for a Dungeons & Dragons game whose players included Warren Spector, who cited Sterling's game as a major inspiration for the game design of Deus Ex.

In 2003, he was appointed professor at the European Graduate School where he is teaching summer intensive courses on media and design. In 2005, he became "visionary in residence" at ArtCenter College of Design in Pasadena, California. He lived in Belgrade with Serbian author and film-maker Jasmina Tešanović for several years, and married her in 2005. In September 2007 he moved to Turin, Italy.

== Awards ==
- 1989 John W. Campbell Memorial Award winner for the novel Islands in the Net
- 1997 Hugo Award winner for the novelette "Bicycle Repairman"
- 1999 Hugo Award winner for the novelette "Taklamakan"
- 1999 Hayakawa's S-F Magazine Reader's Award for Best Foreign Short Story winner for the novelette "Taklamakan"
- 2000 Arthur C. Clarke Award winner for the novel Distraction
