= List of cyberpunk works =

This is a list of works classified as cyberpunk, a subgenre of science fiction. Cyberpunk is characterized by a focus on "high tech and low life" in a near-future setting.

== Print media ==
=== Novels ===
- Do Androids Dream of Electric Sheep? (1968) by Philip K. Dick
- The Atrocity Exhibition (1970) by J. G. Ballard
- The Girl Who Was Plugged In (1973) by James Tiptree Jr.
- The Shockwave Rider (1975) by John Brunner
- True Names (1981) by Vernor Vinge
- Ware Tetralogy (1982–2000) by Rudy Rucker
- The Sprawl trilogy (Neuromancer (1984), Count Zero (1986), and Mona Lisa Overdrive (1988)) by William Gibson – popularized the concept of cyberspace, exemplifies the genre.
- Dr. Adder (1984) by K. W. Jeter
- Schismatrix (1985) by Bruce Sterling
- Eclipse Trilogy (also known as A Song Called Youth Trilogy) (1985–90) by John Shirley – includes Eclipse (1985), Eclipse Penumbra (1988), and Eclipse Corona (1990)
- Hardwired (1986) by Walter Jon Williams
- Mindplayers (1987) by Pat Cadigan
- The Glass Hammer (1987) by K. W. Jeter
- Voice of the Whirlwind (1987) by Walter Jon Williams
- When Gravity Fails (1987) by George Alec Effinger – part of the Effinger's Marîd Audran series
- Islands in the Net (1988) by Bruce Sterling
- A Fire in the Sun (1989) by George Alec Effinger – part of the Effinger's Marîd Audran series
- China 2185 (1989) by Liu Cixin
- My Cousin, My Gastroenterologist (1990) by Mark Leyner
- The Exile Kiss (1991) by George Alec Effinger – part of the Effinger's Marîd Audran series
- Synners (1991) by Pat Cadigan
- Snow Crash (1992) by Neal Stephenson
- The Bridge trilogy (1993–1999) by William Gibson
- Heavy Weather (1994) by Bruce Sterling
- Trouble and Her Friends (1994) by Melissa Scott
- Blade Runner 2: The Edge of Human, Blade Runner 3: Replicant Night, and Blade Runner 4: Eye and Talon (1995–2000) by K. W. Jeter
- The Diamond Age (1996) by Neal Stephenson
- Night Sky Mine (1997) by Melissa Scott
- Noir (1998) by K. W. Jeter
- Tea from an Empty Cup (1998) by Pat Cadigan
- One of Us (1998) by Michael Marshall Smith
- Altered Carbon (2002) by Richard Morgan
- River of Gods (2004) by Ian McDonald
- Accelerando (2005) by Charles Stross
  - Glasshouse (2006)
- Daemon (2006–2010) by Daniel Suarez
- Little Brother (2008) by Cory Doctorow
- The Mirrored Heavens (2008) by David J. Williams
- Ready Player One (2011) by Ernest Cline
- Bleeding Edge (2013) by Thomas Pynchon
- Waste Tide (2013) by Chen Qiufan
- The Peripheral (2014) by William Gibson
- Blackstar (2013–2015) by Josh Viola
- Thin Air (2018) by Richard Morgan
- The Demon Lord 2099 light novel series (2021–present) written by Daigo Murasaki and illustrated by Kureta
- Beautiful Shining People (2023) by Michael Grothaus

=== Short stories, anthologies, and collections ===
- "Cyberpunk" (1983) by Bruce Bethke
- Burning Chrome (1986) by William Gibson
- Mirrorshades: The Cyberpunk Anthology (1986) edited by Bruce Sterling
- Crystal Express (1989) by Bruce Sterling
- Patterns (1989) by Pat Cadigan
- Storming the Reality Studio: A Casebook of Cyberpunk & Postmodern Science Fiction (1992) edited by Larry McCaffery (contains both fiction and nonfiction)
- Hackers (1996) by Jack Dann & Gardner Dozois
- Cyberpunk Malaysia (2016) edited by Zen Cho
- Cyberworld (2019) edited by Jason Heller and Joshua Viola
- The Ultimate Cyberpunk (2002) edited by Pat Cadigan
- Cyberfunk! (2021) edited by Milton Davis
- The Big Book of Cyberpunk (2023) edited by Jared Shurin

=== Graphic novels and comics ===
- Judge Dredd (1977–) by John Wagner and Carlos Ezquerra
- Akira (1982–1990) by Katsuhiro Ōtomo
- Black Magic (1983) by Masamune Shirow
- Ronin (1983–1984) by Frank Miller
- Shatter (1985–1988) by Peter B. Gillis and Mike Saenz
- Appleseed (1985–1989) by Masamune Shirow
- Dominion (1985–1986) by Masamune Shirow
- Ghost in the Shell (1989–1990) by Masamune Shirow
- Neuromancer (1989) by Tom de Haven and Bruce Jensen
- Battle Angel Alita (1990–1995) by Yukito Kishiro
- Martha Washington (1990–1991) by Frank Miller and Dave Gibbons
- Barb Wire (1994–1995) by Chris Warner
- Transmetropolitan (1997–2002) by Warren Ellis
- Eden: It's an Endless World! (1997–2008) by Hiroki Endo
- Blame! (1997–2003) by Tsutomu Nihei
  - NOiSE (2000–2001) – prequel to Blame!
  - Biomega (2004–2009)
- Singularity 7 (2004) by Ben Templesmith
- The Surrogates (2005–2006) by Robert Venditti
- The entire Marvel 2099 line is an example of the cyberpunk genre in comics, especially Ghost Rider 2099 and Spider-Man 2099.
- Marvel's Machine Man Vol. 2
- Batman Beyond
- The True Lives of the Fabulous Killjoys (2013–2014) by Gerard Way and Shaun Simon
- Den fantastiske bus (2023), Danish children's novel by Jakob Martin Strid

=== Magazines and journals ===
- Mondo 2000
- CTheory (1996–2017)
- Cheval Noir (1989–1994)

== Audiovisual media ==
=== Films ===
Most of the films listed are cyberpunk-related either through narrative or by thematic context. Films released before 1982 should be seen as precursors to the genre. Animated films are listed separately in the Animation section below.

- Burst City (1982)
- Tron (1982)
- Blade Runner (1982)
- Brainstorm (1983)
- RoboCop (1987)
- Gunhed (1989)
- Tetsuo: The Iron Man (1989)
- Circuitry Man (1990)
- RoboCop 2 (1990)
- Hardware (1990)
- Megaville (1990)
- Total Recall (1990)
- 964 Pinocchio (1991)
- Until the End of the World (1991)
- Nemesis (1992)
- Fortress (1992)
- Freejack (1992)
- The Lawnmower Man (1992)
- Tetsuo II: Body Hammer (1992)
- Cyborg 2 (1993)
- RoboCop 3 (1993)
- Plughead Rewired: Circuitry Man II (1994)
- Death Machine (1994)
- Hackers (1995)
- Johnny Mnemonic (1995)
- Judge Dredd (1995)
- Strange Days (1995)
- The Demolitionist (1995)
- Virtuosity (1995)
- The Lawnmower Man 2: Beyond Cyberspace (1996)
- Deathline (a.k.a. Redline) (1997)
- Nirvana (1997)
- Andromedia (1998)
- New Rose Hotel (1998)
- Skyggen (a.k.a. Webmaster) (1998)
- eXistenZ (1999)
- The Thirteenth Floor (1999)
- The Matrix (1999)
- I.K.U. (2000)
- The 6th Day (2000)
- Avalon (2001)
- Electric Dragon 80.000 V (2001)
- Impostor (2001)
- Cypher (2002)
- Equilibrium (2002)
- Minority Report (2002)
- Resurrection of the Little Match Girl (2002)
- The Matrix Reloaded (2003)
- The Matrix Revolutions (2003)
- Natural City (2003)
- Paycheck (2003)
- Avatar (a.k.a. Cyber Wars) (2004)
- I, Robot (2004)
- Paranoia 1.0 (a.k.a. One Point 0) (2004)
- Æon Flux (2005)
- Chrysalis (2007)
- The Gene Generation (2007)
- Babylon A.D. (2008)
- Sleep Dealer (2008)
- Hardwired (2009)
- Tetsuo: The Bullet Man (2009)
- Tron: Legacy (2010)
- Repo Men (2010)
- Dredd (2012)
- Total Recall (2012)
- The Zero Theorem (2013)
- The Machine (2013)
- Automata (2014)
- Transcendence (2014)
- RoboCop (2014)
- Chappie (2015)
- Ghost in the Shell (2017)
- Bleeding Steel (2017)
- Blade Runner 2049 (2017)
- Ready Player One (2018)
- Mute (2018)
- Upgrade (2018)
- Hotel Artemis (2018)
- Anon (2018)
- Alita: Battle Angel (2019)
- Archive (2020)
- Zone 414 (2021)
- Reminiscence (2021)
- Finch (2021)
- The Matrix Resurrections (2021)
- Outside the Wire (2021)
- Expired (2022)
- Jung E (2023)
- The Creator (2023)
- Restore Point (2023)
- The Electric State (2025)
- Tron: Ares (2025)
- The Dresden Sun (2026)
- Kill Code (2026)
- Ray Gunn (2026)

=== Animation ===
- Megazone 23 (1985)
- Neo Tokyo (1986)
- Black Magic M-66 (1987)
- Bubblegum Crisis (1987)
  - A.D. Police Files (1990)
  - Bubblegum Crash (1991)
  - Bubblegum Crisis Tokyo 2040 (1998)
  - A.D. Police: To Protect and Serve (1999)
- Akira (1988)
- RoboCop
  - RoboCop: The Animated Series (1988)
  - RoboCop: Alpha Commando (1998–1999)
- Dominion
  - Dominion (1988–1989)
  - New Dominion Tank Police (1993–1994)
  - Tank Police Team: Tank S.W.A.T. 01 (2006)
- Appleseed
  - Appleseed (1988 film)
  - Appleseed (2004 film)
  - Appleseed Ex Machina (2007 film)
  - Appleseed XIII (2011)
  - Appleseed Alpha (2014 film)
- Angel Cop (1989–1994)
- Cyber City Oedo 808 (1990)
- Æon Flux (1991–1995)
- Battle Angel (1993)
- Genocyber (1993)
- Phantom 2040 (1994)
- Armitage III (1995)
- Ghost in the Shell
  - Ghost in the Shell (1995 film)
  - Ghost in the Shell 2: Innocence (2004 film)
  - The Ghost in the Shell (2026)
- Ghost in the Shell: Stand Alone Complex (S.A.C.)
  - Ghost in the Shell: Stand Alone Complex (S.A.C.) (2002–2003)
  - Ghost in the Shell: S.A.C. 2nd GIG (2004–2005)
  - Ghost in the Shell: Stand Alone Complex – Solid State Society (2006 film)
  - Ghost in the Shell: SAC 2045 (2020–2022)
- Ghost in the Shell: Arise
  - Ghost in the Shell: Arise (2013–2015)
  - Ghost in the Shell: The New Movie (2016 film)
- Spicy City (1997)
- Virus Buster Serge (1997)
- Serial Experiments Lain (1998)
- Gundress (1999)
- Batman Beyond (1999–2001)
- Malice@Doll (2001)
- Metropolis (2001)
- The Animatrix (2003)
- Code Lyoko (2003–2007)
- Heat Guy J (2003)
- Parasite Dolls (2003)
- Texhnolyze (2003)
- Wonderful Days (a.k.a. Sky Blue) (2003)
- Burst Angel (2004)
- Fragile Machine (2005)
- Aachi & Ssipak (2006)
- A Scanner Darkly (2006)
- Ergo Proxy (2006)
- Renaissance (2006)
- Dennō Coil (2007)
- Vexille (2007)
- Technotise: Edit & I (2009, Serbia)
- Real Drive (2008)
- Mardock Scramble (2010)
- Accel World (2012–2016)
- Psycho-Pass (2012)
- MotorCity (2012–2013)
- Tron: Uprising (2012–2013)
- Dimension W (2016)
- Blame! (2017)
- No Guns Life (2019–2020)
- Altered Carbon: Resleeved (2020)
- Akudama Drive (2020)
- Blade Runner: Black Lotus (2021–2022)
- Cyberpunk: Edgerunners (2022–present)
- Pluto (2023)
- Mars Express (2023)
- Digimon Beatbreak (2025–present)

=== Television and web series ===
- World on a Wire (1973)
- Overdrawn at the Memory Bank (1983)
- Max Headroom: 20 Minutes into the Future (1985), British television movie
  - Max Headroom (1987), American television series based on the UK TV movie
- Wild Palms (1993)
- TekWar (1994)
- RoboCop: The Series (1994)
- VR.5 (1996)
- Welcome to Paradox (1998)
- The X-Files, two episodes of the series were written by William Gibson and contain cyberpunk themes:
  - Kill Switch (1998)
  - First Person Shooter (2000)
- Harsh Realm (1999)
- Total Recall 2070 (1999)
- Dark Angel (2000–2002)
- RoboCop: Prime Directives (2001)
- Charlie Jade (2005)
- Dollhouse (2009–2010)
- Person of Interest (2011–2016)
- Black Mirror (2011–present)
- Continuum (2012–2015), set in the present with a protagonist who has time traveled back from a cyberpunk future in 2077
- H+: The Digital Series (2012)
- Code Lyoko: Evolution (2013)
- Almost Human (2013–2014)
- Die Gstettensaga: The Rise of Echsenfriedl (2014)
- Mr. Robot (2015–2019)
- Humans (2015–2018)
- Westworld (2016–2022)
- Incorporated (2016–2017)
- Altered Carbon (2018–2020)
- Better Than Us (2018–2019)
- Love, Death & Robots (2019–present)
- Meta Runner (2019–2022)
- Onisciente (2020)
- Upload (2020–present)
- Pantheon (2022–2023)
- Bodies (2023)
- Tomorrow and I (2024)
- Secret Level (2024)
- Knights of Guinevere (2025)
- Blade Runner 2099 (2026)
- Neuromancer (2027)

=== Music ===
- Blade Runner by Vangelis
- Cyberpunk by Billy Idol
- Drezden by Drezden
- Introducing Neals by YTCracker
- Metropolis series by Janelle Monáe
  - Metropolis: The Chase Suite (2007)
  - The ArchAndroid (2010)
  - The Electric Lady (2013)
- Outside by David Bowie
- Tactical Neural Implant by Front Line Assembly
- Transverse City by Warren Zevon
- Year Zero by Nine Inch Nails
- 新しい日の誕生 by 2814
- 2093 by Yeat
- The Protomen trilogy
  - The Protomen (2005)
  - Act II: The Father of Death (2009)
  - Act III: This City Made Us (2026)
- Dead Channel Sky by clipping.
- Leather Temple by Carpenter Brut

=== Video games ===
- Imitation City (1987)
- Megami Tensei series (1987–present)
  - Digital Devil Story: Megami Tensei (1987)
  - Devil Summoner: Soul Hackers (1997)
  - Shin Megami Tensei: Digital Devil Saga (2004)
  - Shin Megami Tensei IV (2013)
  - Soul Hackers 2 (2022)
- Metal Gear series (1987–present)
  - Metal Gear Solid (1998)
  - Metal Gear Solid 2: Sons of Liberty (2001)
  - Metal Gear Solid 4: Guns of the Patriots (2008)
  - Metal Gear Rising Revengeance (2013)
- Akira (1988–2002)
  - Akira (1988)
  - Akira Psycho Ball (2002)
- Neuromancer (1988)
- Snatcher (1988–1996)
- Genocide (1989)
- Night Striker (1989)
- Flashback (1992)
- BloodNet (1993)
- Hired Guns (1993)
- DreamWeb (1994)
- Shadowrun series
  - Shadowrun (SNES) (1993)
  - Shadowrun (Sega Genesis) (1994)
  - Shadowrun (Sega CD) (1996)
  - Shadowrun (2007)
  - Shadowrun Returns (2013)
  - Shadowrun: Dragonfall (2014)
  - Shadowrun Chronicles: Boston Lockdown (2015)
  - Shadowrun: Hong Kong (2015)
- Syndicate series
  - Syndicate (1993)
  - Syndicate Wars (1996)
  - Syndicate (2012 video game) (2012)
- Beneath a Steel Sky (1994)
- Burn:Cycle (1994)
- Hell: A Cyberpunk Thriller (1994)
- Delta V (1994)
- Hagane: The Final Conflict (1994)
- Live A Live (1994)
- Rise of the Robots (1994)
- Policenauts (1994)
- Appleseed series
  - Appleseed: Oracle of Prometheus (1994)
  - Appleseed EX (2004)
- System Shock series
  - System Shock (1994)
  - System Shock 2 (1999)
  - System Shock (2023 video game) (2023)
- CyberMage: Darklight Awakening (1995)
- Johnny Mnemonic: The Interactive Action Movie (1995)
- Phantom 2040 (1995)
- Road Rage (1995)
- William Shatner's TekWar (1995)
- Osman (1996)
- Blade Runner (1997)
- G-Police (1997)
- Ghost in the Shell (1997)
- Kowloon's Gate (1997)
- Einhänder (1998)
- Nightlong: Union City Conspiracy (1998)
- SiN series
  - SiN (1998)
  - Sin Mission Pack: Wages of Sin (1999)
  - Sin Episodes: Emergence (2006)
- Xenogears (1998)
- The Creed (1999)
- The Nomad Soul (1999)
- Slave Zero (1999)
- Ace Combat 3: Electrosphere (1999)
- Galerians series
  - Galerians (1999)
  - Galerians: Ash (2002)
- deSpiria (2000)
- Fear Effect series
  - Fear Effect (2000)
  - Fear Effect 2: Retro Helix (2001)
  - Fear Effect Sedna (2018)
- Deus Ex series
  - Deus Ex (2000)
  - Deus Ex: Invisible War (2003)
  - Deus Ex: Human Revolution (2011)
  - Deus Ex: The Fall (2013)
  - Deus Ex: Mankind Divided (2016)
- Perfect Dark series
  - Perfect Dark (2000)
  - Perfect Dark Zero (2005)
- Oni (2001)
- Anachronox (2001)
- Mega Man Battle Network series
  - Mega Man Battle Network (2001)
  - Mega Man Battle Network 2 (2001)
  - Mega Man Battle Network 3 (2002)
  - Mega Man Network Transmission (2003)
  - Mega Man Battle Chip Challenge (2003)
  - Mega Man Battle Network 4 (2003)
  - Mega Man Battle Network 5 (2004)
  - Mega Man Battle Network 6 (2005)
- Uplink (2001)
- Breath of Fire: Dragon Quarter (2002)
- .hack series
  - .hack//IMOQ (2002–2003)
  - .hack//G.U. (2006–2007)
  - .hack//Link (2010)
  - .hack//Z.E.R.O. (TBA)
- Neocron series
  - Neocron (2002)
  - Neocron 2: Beyond Dome of York (2004)
- The Matrix
  - Enter the Matrix (2003)
  - Matrix Online (2005)
  - The Matrix: Path of Neo (2005)
  - The Matrix Awakens (2021)
- P.N.03 (2003)
- Cy Girls (2004)
- Æon Flux (2005)
- Dystopia (2005)
- System Rush (2005)
- Mirror's Edge series
  - Mirror's Edge (2008)
  - Mirror's Edge (mobile) (2010)
  - Mirror's Edge Catalyst (2016)
- Halo 3: ODST (2009)
- NeoTokyo (2009)
- MindJack (2011)
- Gemini Rue (2011)
- Hard Reset (2011)
- Cypher (2012)
- Blacklight: Retribution (2012)
- Binary Domain (2012)
- Primordia (2012)
- Cataclysm: Dark Days Ahead (2013)
- Remember Me (2013)
- Far Cry 3: Blood Dragon (2013)
- Alien: Isolation (2014)
- Jazzpunk (2014)
- Transistor (2014)
- Watch Dogs series
  - Watch Dogs (2014)
  - Watch Dogs 2 (2016)
  - Watch Dogs: Legion (2020)
- 2064: Read Only Memories (2015)
- Call of Duty series
  - Call of Duty: Black Ops 2 (2012)
  - Call of Duty: Advanced Warfare (2014)
  - Call of Duty: Black Ops III (2015)
- Dex (2015)
- Technobabylon (2015)
- Soma (2015)
- Satellite Reign (2015)
- Digimon Story: Cyber Sleuth (2015)
- Invisible, Inc. (2016)
- Superhot (2016)
- VA-11 HALL-A (2016)
- Girls' Frontline (2016–present)
- Digimon Story: Cyber Sleuth – Hacker's Memory (2017)
- Dreamfall Chapters (2017)
- Observer (2017)
- Ruiner series
  - Ruiner (2017)
  - Ruiner 2 (TBA)
- Tokyo 42 (2017)
- The Red Strings Club (2018)
- Exapunks (2018)
- Ion Fury (2018)
- State of Mind (2018)
- Tales of the Neon Sea (2018)
- Astral Chain (2019)
- Katana Zero (2019)
- Punishing: Gray Raven (2019)
- Dohna Dohna (2020)
- Cyberpunk 2077 (2020)
  - Cyberpunk 2077: Phantom Liberty (2023)
- Ghostrunner (2020)
- Incredibox
  - V8: Dystopia (2020)
- Cloudpunk (2020)
- Huntdown (2020)
- Detroit: Become Human (2020)
- The Ascent (2021)
- Cruelty Squad (2021)
- Necromunda: Hired Gun (2021)
- Cyberplug (2021)
- Citizen Sleeper (2022)
- Stray (2022)
- SIGNALIS (2022)
- Bomb Rush Cyberfunk (2023)
- RoboCop: Rogue City (2023)
  - RoboCop: Rogue City - Unfinished Business (2025)
- Rendezvous (2023)
- Turbo Overkill (2023)
- Dystopika (2024)
- Nobody Wants to Die (2024)
- Mullet MadJack (2024)
- Zenless Zone Zero (2024)
- Nine Sols (2024)
- Citizen Sleeper 2: Starward Vector (2025)
- Of the Devil (2025)
- MindsEye (2025)
- Split Fiction (2025)
- Screamer (2026)
- Replaced (2026)
- .45 Parabellum Bloodhound (2026)
- Nivalis Nights (2026)
- Spine (2027)
- No law (2027)
- Neo Berlin 2087 (2028)
- Last Sentinel (TBA)
- The Last Night (TBA)
- N1RV Ann-A (TBA)
- Vigilancer 2099 (TBA)
- DEFECT (TBA)

=== Tabletop games ===
- Cyberpunk (1988)
  - Cyberpunk 2020 (1990)
  - Cyberpunk V3.0 (2005)
  - Cyberpunk Red (2020)
- Shadowrun (1989)
- GURPS Cyberpunk (1990)
- Necromunda (1995)
- Infinity (2005)
- Corporation (2009)
- Deadzone (2013)
- Carbon 2185 | A Cyberpunk RPG (2019)

== Related nonfiction ==
- A Cyborg Manifesto (1991), by Donna Haraway
- Storming the Reality Studio: A Casebook of Cyberpunk & Postmodern Science Fiction (1992), edited by Larry McCaffery (contains both fiction and nonfiction)
- No Maps for These Territories (2000), documentary about William Gibson

== See also ==
- Cyberpunk derivatives
- Japanese cyberpunk
- List of films about computers
- List of biopunk works
- List of steampunk works
- Tech noir
