= Nekki =

Nekki may refer to:

== Companies ==
- Nekki, a video game studio that developed Shadow Fight and Vector

== Fictional characters ==
- Nekki, a character in Samurai Pizza Cats
- Necky the Fox or Japanese: Nekki, a mascot of Famitsu
- Basara Nekki, a character in Macross 7

== People with the given name ==
- Nekki Shutt, founder of SC Equality
