= VA11 =

VA-11 may refer to:

- Attack Squadron 11 (U.S. Navy)
- Virginia State Route 11 (disambiguation)
- Virginia's 11th congressional district
- VA-11 (Valladolid), a highway in Spain
- VA-11 HALL-A, a simulation video game
