= Spine (video game) =

- Developer: Nekki
- Publisher: Nekki
- Director: Dmitry Pimenov
- Engine: Unreal Engine 5
- Platforms: Nintendo Switch 2; PlayStation 5; Windows; Xbox Series X/S
- Release: Windows, PlayStation 5, Xbox Series X/S; Summer 2027; Nintendo Switch 2; TBA
- Genres: Action-adventure, beat 'em up
- Mode: Single-player

Spine (Note: Stylized as SPINE or SPINE – This is Gun Fu) is an upcoming action-adventure beat 'em up game developed and published by Nekki for Nintendo Switch 2, PlayStation 5, Windows and Xbox Series X/S. The game follows Redline, a street artist who is fitted with a sentient combat implant called Spine, as she fights against an oppressive AI regime to find her captured brother. The game combines elements of gun fu, third-person shooter, and cyberpunk, and is inspired by the John Wick films.

== Gameplay ==
Spine is an action-adventure beat 'em up game set in a dystopian cyberpunk world. Players take on the role of the female protagonist, Redline, a rebellious graffiti artist who acquires gun fu skills after receiving the titular spinal implant, which serves as her sentient AI companion and gives her new combat abilities throughout the game. Redline must rescue her captive brother from the autocratic AI regime known as Tensor, while fighting street thugs, mafia bosses, and trained assassins, some of whom are also similarly augmented by implants.

Spine's gameplay is centered around close-quarters combat with firearms, as Redline performs various combos based on the weapons she wields. It comprises around 20 missions, each designed like a standalone short film and set in cinematic environments. The player can snatch and use enemies' weapons and use Redline's spraycan to blind enemies. The game also incorporates parkour and acrobatic elements.

The game will feature a hardcore mode wherein the player must complete all missions without taking a single hit.

== Development ==
Early gameplay teaser, showing the elements of gun fu

Spine was announced in August 2021 by Nekki, the creators of Shadow Fight series and Vector, and was originally conceptualized as a PvP game. In December 2023, Nekki announced that the game would be repositioned as a single-player narrative action game based on fast-paced combat, and released a trailer of the gameplay.

The game runs on Unreal Engine 5, and also uses its own custom data shaders and Nekki's proprietary 3D animation software called Cascadeur. Art director Alexander Nemov stated that while the game's story and visuals are based on the cyberpunk genre, the game adopts a modern feel instead of the typical retrofuturistic theme. He added that the game is intended as "a warning of sorts against a digital dystopia."

The developers have cited the John Wick film series and the works of John Woo, who popularized the gun fu genre in Hong Kong cinema, as main inspirations for the game. A gameplay trailer released at the Future Games Show at 2024 Gamescom contained references to various films that inspired the game and featured music composed by Le Castle Vania, who had previously worked on the aforementioned John Wick series. Early reviews likened the gameplay to Sifu (2022) and Batman: Arkham Knight (2015).

== Adaptations ==
In late 2023, a nine-episode webtoon, which serves as a prologue to the game's storyline, was released.

In April 2024, Variety reported that Nekki, in collaboration with Story Kitchen, is planning to adapt the game for television and film, with Dmitri M. Johnson and Michael Lawrence Goldberg producing. Game director Dmitry Pimenov remarked that Spine would be a transmedia project, with web comics, merchandise, board games, and potential film and television adaptations being planned alongside the game.
