= Shadow Fight 2 =

2014 video game

- Developers: Nekki and Banzai Games
- Publisher: Nekki
- Series: Shadow Fight
- Engine: Marmalade (Version 1.0.0 to 1.9.38); Unity (Version 2.0.0 to current)
- Platforms: iOS; Android; Windows Phone; Windows; Android TV; Mac OS; Nintendo Switch
- Release: iOS: September 20, 2013; Android: September 25, 2013; Windows Phone: November 25, 2014; Android TV: April 27, 2015; Mac OS: October 29, 2015; Nintendo Switch: September 13, 2018
- Genre: Fighting
- Mode: Single-player,

Shadow Fight 2 is a role-playing fighting game published and developed by Nekki and Banzai Games. It is the second installment in the Shadow Fight series and was soft-launched on September 20, 2013. The full game was released worldwide on May 1, 2014, for both the Android and iOS operating systems. It was then released to Windows 8 and 8.1 on January 26, 2015, and to the Nintendo Switch as a downloadable Nintendo eShop title on September 13, 2018.

The game uses the same graphic style as Shadow Fight, which depict the player character and their opponents as 2D silhouettes. The player starts out unarmed, but as they level up, they unlock more advanced weapons and equipment. The game is more story-driven than its predecessor and follows a warrior known only as "Shadow", who fights to regain his lost honor and physical body after accidentally opening the Gates of Shadow and unleashing six demons into his world, who reduced him to a faceless silhouette. The title also features a multiplayer mode, which sees players working together to fight powerful bosses in the Underworld.

Shadow Fight 2 received a large number of positive reviews upon release and is regarded as one of the best fighting games for mobile devices.

== Gameplay ==
Screenshot of a Ninja opponent using magic while the player (right) dodges and attacks from above

Shadow Fight 2 is a 2D fighting game in which players must win the best of three matches against computer-controlled opponents. The game also has RPG elements that let players upgrade their armor, weapons, skills and magical abilities. The game's characters are entirely silhouettes, but the animations are semi-realistic and physics-based.

The player earns gold throughout the game that can be used to buy weapons. The game contains seven different provinces, each with a main boss. The player can enter only five fights before their energy must be replenished, which is done by waiting, paying real money, or watching a limited number of ads. These games may come to a series end after which the full game is completed.

Achievements are a core part of Shadow Fight 2. Players are rewarded for completing the story as well as certain tasks.

== Story ==
The world of Shadow Fight 2 takes heavy inspiration from classic Asian culture, some being Imperial China, Feudal Japan and Rajput states while Titan’s world beyond the Gates of Shadows is portrayed as a sci-fi–inspired alien dimension, emphasizing its otherworldly and non-human nature rather than any real-world culture. Many dialogues in the game show how Shadow and various other antagonists, such as Ninjas and bodyguards like Capra, Puma, and Dandy, travel the continent via the ancient Silk Road. One notable dialogue from Capra highlights this journey: "I came here because of the huntresses beauty, it dragged me from the depths of the world. Traveled two continents just to lose against you. That will never happen." Every time the player enters the game, they are presented with an animated cutscene that explains the backstory of the protagonist, "Shadow", who also serves as the narrator. Shadow explains that he was once a legendary warrior, renowned for never losing a battle. While seeking a worthy opponent, he opened the Gates of Shadows, a pathway to another realm, unleashing six powerful demons into his world. The demons destroyed Shadow's physical body, reducing him to a faceless silhouette, and went on to bring mayhem and destruction into the world. Now, Shadow feels obligated to defeat the demons. To seal back the Gates, he must retrieve the ancient Seals they are guarding and use them and atone for his mistake.

The game is structured into multiple chapters, or "acts", each revolving around one of the demons Shadow must face:

- Lynx, the leader of an assassin group called The Order. (Hero Reborn)
- Hermit, a powerful wizard and warrior who opened his own school. (Secret Path)
- Butcher, the leader of a juvenile gang. (Trail of Blood)
- Wasp, the leader of a pirate crew and self-proclaimed "Pirate Queen". (Pirate Throne)
- Widow, who can seduce virtually any man with her charms. (The Greatest Temptation)
- Shogun, a disgraced rōnin-turned-warlord. (Iron Reign)
- Titan, Conqueror of The World. Last boss of the game. (Revelation)

== Soundtrack ==
The game's soundtrack was composed by the Russian composer Lind Erebros. He is also known for his works in Nekki's game series Vector.

== Reception ==
Reception

Aggregate score
Aggregator	Score
Metacritic	NS: 55/100

Jason Parker of CNET rated the game an 8.3/10, calling it one of the best fighting games in the App Store "If you can live with the in-your-face freemium model."

Rob Rich of Gamezebo rated the game 3.5/5 stars, praising the animations and weapon variety while criticizing the "imprecise controls" and some combat mechanics.

Silviu Stahie of Softpedia called the game "probably the best fighting game for Android" and said that it was "easy to learn and master."

== Special Edition ==
Special Edition is the paid version of Shadow Fight 2. It was released on August 17, 2017, on Android and on August 22, 2017, on iOS. This version rewards players with gems more frequently and features an exclusive storyline called Old Wounds. The Nintendo Switch version of Shadow Fight 2, released in 2018, contains the same content as the Special Edition, as well as an exclusive local two-player fighting mode.

== Sequel ==
A sequel, Shadow Fight 3, was released worldwide on November 16, 2017. Unlike its predecessors, it does not have any flat 2D black shadows to represent the fighters. Instead, they are rendered as three-dimensional characters in an animated 3D environment. In addition, players can change their character and fighting style. An in-game mechanic called "shadows" can be accessed with a new mode known as Shadow Form. While in this form, the fighters harness their collected Shadow energy and enter Shadow Form and thus are able to perform physics-defying moves based on the fighters' equipped item's shadow abilities. Players can also collect unique equipment sets which when equipped together can grant them unique abilities such as increased damage, and other bonuses.
