= Lorn's Lure =

2024 platform video game

- Developer: Rubeki Games
- Publisher: Rubeki Games
- Platforms: Windows, macOS, Linux
- Release: September 20, 2024
- Genre: Platform game
- Mode: Single-player

Lorn's Lure is a 2024 platform game developed and published by independent developer Rubeki Games. Released for Windows, macOS, and Linux on September 20, 2024, the game follows an android exploring an abandoned megastructure. It features first-person climbing and parkour mechanics, environmental storytelling, and retro-inspired graphics.

== Gameplay ==
Lorn's Lure is a first-person platformer in which players navigate a vast industrial structure using jumping, sliding, climbing, and other movement abilities including wall-running and using a grappling hook. Players can scale vertical surfaces using climbing picks.

== Development and release ==
Lorn's Lure was developed by Rubeki Games. Its visual style draws on early three-dimensional video games, while its environments were influenced by the science fiction manga Blame! by Tsutomu Nihei. An early prototype appeared in the 2021 Haunted PS1 Demo Disc.

The game was released on September 20, 2024, for Windows, macOS, and Linux.

== Reception ==
Lorn's Lure received positive reviews from critics, who highlighted its atmosphere, challenging platforming, and level design. Tiago Manuel of Destructoid awarded the game 8 out of 10, praising its movement mechanics and environments while criticizing occasional difficulties with navigation.

Dominic Tarason of PC Gamer praised the game's challenging traversals and atmospheric environments, comparing its later platforming sections to those of Celeste. He also noted the game's forgiving restart system, which allows players to retry difficult jumps without lengthy interruptions.

Polygon highlighted the game's combination of speedrunning-oriented mechanics and slower exploration, noting that its environments encourage players to discover their own routes.
