= William Goldberg =

William Goldberg may refer to:

- William Goldberg (diamond dealer) (1925–2003), American diamond dealer
- Bill Goldberg (born 1966), American professional wrestler
- Billy Goldberg (born 1966), New York City emergency medicine physician
