= Why Do Men Have Nipples? =

Non-fictional book written by Mark Leyner

Why Do Men Have Nipples?, subtitled Hundreds of Questions You'd Only Ask a Doctor After Your Third Martini, is a humor/medical book written by Mark Leyner and Billy Goldberg, M.D., and is a New York Times Bestseller.
