= List of Blame! characters =

The fictional universe of the Japanese manga series Blame! is home to many characters and locations, created by Tsutomu Nihei.

== Main characters ==
Killy as seen in Blame!

Killy (霧亥, Kirii; also referred to as Kyrii)
Voiced by: Takahiro Sakurai (Japanese); Kyle McCarley (English)
Killy is a main character of Blame!. He is a cyborg tasked by the governing AI agency with finding a human in the 5.3-AU radius Megastructure who still possesses the Net Terminal Gene, a genetic marker necessary for safe access to the Netsphere, from which the functions of the Megastructure may be controlled. He is equipped with a Gravitational Beam Emitter (GBE), a compact but immensely powerful weapon capable of creating holes miles long in the Megastructure. He is soon joined by Cibo in his quest.
Looking to be in his early to mid-20s, he is a glum-looking person, never smiling (except madly when shooting on occasion) and has a slight slouch in his normal standing position, he is not afraid to fight, and readily shoots the GBE. He also often shows superhuman strength and endurance, being thrown through solid walls and floors before standing right back up with no apparent injuries. The GBE is so powerful that he is flung backwards by its sheer power, often into walls and the ground, but he always gets up. Even in its lowest power, his arm jerks up and back from the force of it. During the encounter with the giant Safeguard outside Toha Heavy Industries, he fires at the Safeguard with the GBE at Level 4 Extra power level. The recoil from the GBE is so powerful that he is thrown back a considerable distance and his right arm is broken, exposing bone and tissue. Killy can survive injuries that would kill an average human as well as recover faster. In the times when he is quiet, he injects drugs into himself in the forehead, and when he is low on power, he may inject it straight into his hand.
He has an electronic connector to create signals to stop Builders and to transmit information from one person to himself, and vice versa. He also has no memory of his past, or how he obtained the GBE. Killy distrusts Silicon Creatures on sight, and destroys them whenever possible; whether or not they are hostile towards him or his objectives does not bear any weight on his judgement. In Blame!², however, he rescues Pcell (part of a new, relatively peaceful generation of Silicon Life) from the Safeguard, indicating either that his priorities have changed or that he no longer considers Silicon Creatures to be a serious threat.
Cibo (シボ, Shibo)
Voiced by: Kana Hanazawa (Japanese); Cristina Vee (English) (anime film), Asuka Aizawa (Japanese, ONA)
Cibo is the head scientist of the Bio-Electric Corporation in the Capitol and joins Killy on his quest for the Net Terminal Gene.
Killy's first encounter with Cibo is in the lower levels of the Corporation in The Capitol, where she has been imprisoned for attempting to access the Net Sphere with an artificially created version of Net Terminal Genes. Her failed attempt to access the Net Sphere led to the appearance of the Safeguard, which destroyed the entire lab facility that Cibo was conducting the experiment in. The death and destruction resulting from Cibo's failed experiment led the governing body of the Corporation to convict and imprison her.
Cibo's first form is the decaying upper torso of a woman kept alive by machinery inserted into her body. She convinces Killy to take her with him by stating that he needs her hacking skills to access the files he is looking for. Afterwards, she transfers her mind to a replacement body and aids Killy in destroying the Corporation's President. Following that, Cibo leaves the Corporation to travel with Killy.
Later in the manga, Cibo's physical body is killed by the Safeguard, but her mind takes over Sanakan's body. However, Sanakan's consciousness still remains in the body, forcing the two women to share it. Cibo is able to suppress Sanakan's mind, preventing it from gaining control, although on one occasion the Safeguard managed to take over.
After the encounter with the Silicon Life, Mensab and Seu, Killy is teleported to an alternate reality, where he meets an alternate Cibo in her old form. Both versions of Cibo face one another and wish to return to the original reality. During the attempt, the alternate Cibo is killed by a Silicon Life creature, while the original Cibo is severely damaged and Sanakan's mind uses the opportunity to resurface. At the last moment before she is overtaken, Cibo extracts her personality data and transfers it into the corpse of her alternate self, reviving the body and living again.
After an altercation with Silicon Life intending to access the Netsphere, a Level 9 Safeguard (the highest level) was illegally downloaded into Cibo, resulting in her ultimate transformation into the Level 9 Safeguard and the newly-bred Net Terminal Gene. The sphere that she stores in her lower abdomen carries the gene that can save the city if it is taken to its very edge where it can grow uncontaminated by the megastructure and its inhabitants. Sanakan mentions that the "child" is a product of hers and Cibo's combined DNA. Cibo is heavily weakened by Killy's GBE shortly after her transformation, reverting to a childlike state and eventually falling into the hands of the Silicon Creatures despite Sanakan's efforts to find and protect her. Sanakan asks for a return to the Base Reality without backup data, driven by a desire to protect her "child" and charge. She tears through Silicon Creatures to reach Cibo, and then encounters a First Class Exterminator. Killy destroys the Exterminator and recovers the orb, though the Exterminator destroys Cibo and Sanakan during the battle.

== Other characters ==
=== Safeguard ===
The Safeguard are a program independent of the Netsphere. The Netsphere was designed as a means of providing service to those who could log on. However, the Netsphere was thrown into chaos (the actual reason is not exactly known, but the prequel manga NOiSE implies that a small group of humans is at fault) and the Safeguard changed their modus operandi from preventing unauthorized users from entering the Netsphere to killing off anyone who does not possess Net Terminal Genes. The Safeguard have nine levels of hierarchy, Level 9 being the most powerful. However, their Exterminator (originally the lowest level safeguard) system has a different form of hierarchy where "First Class" is the most powerful.

Sana-Kan in Safeguard Mode

- Sanakan (サナカン)

Voiced by: Saori Hayami (Japanese); Kira Buckland (English)
Sanakan is first seen as a short, young girl with black hair who finds Killy and Cibo in a tunnel after they pierce the impenetrable Megastructure layer with the GBE.
Killy later discovers her true nature and she reveals herself as a high-level Safeguard with a GBE similar to Killy's. At first, Sanakan behaves like any Safeguard intent on annihilating all humans without the Net Terminal Gene. This changes however, when she becomes a representative of the Governing Agency with the task of retrieving Cibo, who at that time becomes the illegal level 9 Safeguard unit. At this point, she adapts a more protective role.
Sanakan's physical body was destroyed twice in the line of duty; First in order to destroy the Toha Heavy Industries' Central AI and for the second time while protecting Cibo from Silicon Creatures. She finally dies when she sacrifices herself in order to save Killy and the globe that Cibo carried from an Exterminator. Sanakan has been the second "mother" of the child with the net terminal genes, along with Cibo, who was carrying the globe with the embryo.

- Dhomochevsky - Dhomochevsky is a Special Safeguard; the type that is not hostile to humans. This may be due to the fact that he and Iko were essentially stranded in base reality with no backup when the safeguard system on their level was disabled by silicon creatures shortly after their programs were initiated. He has a distinctive scar on his left eye where Schiff stabbed him. Along with Iko, he was recruited to protect a provisional level of the megastructure. A group of Silicon Life cyborgs has invaded this level, led by Davine. Dhomo and Iko are insistent on the level's defense because only normal human genes are required for access to the netsphere. He is armed with a quad-barrel gun with many different projectile types. Dhomochevsky is heavily damaged and decapitated by the newly downloaded Level 9 Safeguard, which was instinctively responding to a threat.
- Iko - Iko appears as the thin, white wisp of a facial image. However, in the manga, it is suggested in a flashback of Dhomochevsky's that she had a corporeal shape once, but how she lost it was never explained. Most likely, she was unable to gain a new body as the Silicon Life on her level captured the Substance Conversion Tower on which she and Dhomochevsky depended. She acts as a guardian for Dhomochevsky, predicts the behavior of his opponents, and heals him if possible. She transfers all her power to Dhomochevsky in a last-ditch effort to stop Davine as well as Cibo's transformation into a Level 9 Safeguard.

=== Silicon Life (Cyborgs) ===
- Ivy - Ivy is the leader of the contingent of Cyborgs attacking Toha Heavy Industries. He carries a massive weapon, which is essentially four swords, with two of them spring-loaded to swing out from the middle to bludgeon enemies. He is eventually defeated in a sword fight with Seu. (There has been some confusion as to which characters the names Ivy and Maeve are assigned to. This is most likely due to the artwork of the two characters reading: Ivy & Maeve, with the more feminine cyborg on the left and the other on the right. Apart from the text, the artwork is in original Japanese format, and in Japan, they read right to left. Also, in volume 4 their names are clearly distinguished by their dialogues.)
- Maeve - Maeve is Ivy's sidekick. The lower half of her body is sliced off by Seu in a fight. Later on, Ivy and some of his contingent discover the 'advanced' cyborg fused to a wall. They cut it out, wrench the cyborg's original head out and implant Maeve into the body. Later, as Maeve is about to execute Mensab, Seu attempts to kill her by throwing his sword and lodging it in her forehead. She seems almost indifferent to this, but before proceeding, she is killed by Killy who fires a Gravitational Beam through her heart. This happens just before the teleportation of Toha Heavy Industries.
- Blon - One of Davine Lu Linvega's henchmen. Blon is capable of commanding worm-like creatures, which attach to a target's spine and render the target unconscious. He has the capacity to transform his body, taking the shape of a large centipede-esque creature in his first appearance before morphing into a humanoid shape to attack Killy and Cibo. Most of his body is destroyed by Killy in their first encounter. His first defeat allows Pcell to detect the 70-kilometer long holes left by Killy's GBE. When Dhomochevsky, Cibo and Iko set out to find Killy and Davine, Pcell appears to confront them at a large Megastructure transport hatch and minutes later, Blon appears in his third form at her command. The third form resembles a large, metallic, spider-praying mantis hybrid with Blon's face and his large chain-gun (Vulcan Cannon/Gatling Gun) on its left arm (where it is in Blon's humanoid form). When Blon attacks, he slightly wounds Dhomochevsky and is able to steal a capsule from Cibo containing Seu's genetic information. Blon is finally killed when Dhomochevsky, Cibo and Iko enter the hatch's portal and close the hatch itself while Blon is still in the hatch locking area. This crushes and destroys his entire body. The capsule lands less than a foot outside the hatch radius and is picked up by Pcell.
- Schiff - Schiff is another of Davine Lu Linvega's lieutenants. He wields two rectangular black blades mounted into his full-body armor, which may be launched as projectiles. Schiff is the first Silicon Life to attack Killy after Killy loses his GBE (and is forced to use more conventional safeguard weaponry). After a short hand-to-hand fight, Killy gains the upper hand and lands several punches which essentially mangle Schiff's armored face. While Schiff is clawing at his broken face, Killy administers the coup de grâce.
- Davine Lu Linvega - Leader of a contingent of cyborgs who Killy encounters late in the series. The level on which she is present allows provisional access to the Net Sphere to any person having normal human DNA. Davinel wants to access the Net Sphere and tries to obtain the DNA sample in Cibo's possession (which is Seu's). Afterward she is able to infiltrate the Netsphere in Seu's form. However, she fatally underestimates the Governing Agency's agent who cleverly slows the connection speed, allowing enough time for Dhomochevsky to attack and kill her. However, she manages to steal the Level 9 safeguard data just before Dhomochevsky kills her. Linvega's gender has been up to debate; Iko first refers to them as male. However, the side comic BLAME! Academy depicts Linvega as a girl.
- Pcell - Davinel's subordinate; a skilled combatant wielding a sword-like weapon that emits blasts of force capable of deflecting even the GBE's beam. According to Iko, she is the most dangerous of the invading Silicon Life. Unusually for a Silicon Life, she has the capacity to use the Safeguards' structure conversion tower (hijacked by Davine) to repair herself and evade attacks. She is implied to have some connection with Dhomochevsky, but the nature of this connection is unknown. After Cibo transforms into the Level 9 Safeguard, Pcell attempts to kill her with a blast from her sword and is killed by Killy in retaliation (v8 p174).
- Silicon Creature Generals - The two mysterious Silicon Creatures heading the Silicon settlement that captures the Level 9 Safeguard. Both carry staff-like weapons that are extremely similar in ability to that of the 'Safeguard Sword.' The male cyborg, seen wearing an armor plated trench-coat and various black metal accessories, wounds Sanakan as he makes a final attempt to stop her. The female cyborg, seen with black and white hair and wearing black and metallic clothing, is last seen dismembering the rogue armored cyborg. It is left to the reader to decide whether or not Killy dispatches her.

=== Humans ===
- Technomads - Humans who encounter Killy while he is still quite low in The City. They have lost all knowledge of their heritage, and have some connection to their Planter/Electrofisher relatives. Each group wears similar armor and the Electrofishers and Technomads share a stylized tribal appearance, though it is unclear which group is descended from which. The Technomads travel from safe haven to safe haven, never venturing outside their shelters without heavy protection.
- Laborers - Humans who dwell in the Power Corporation city near the top of a megastructure. Prone to heavy body modification, their appearance depends greatly on their occupation within the corporation. Ordinarily, they have evolved to be quite large, dwarfing the average-sized Killy by three to four feet. The Power Corporation has excavated a great deal of technology from the surrounding megastructure, emulating the technology of the Safeguard, Authority, and Silicon Life. These further affect their culture and appearance, as they devote a great deal of time researching and developing this part of their culture.
- The Dry Men - While it is unclear whether they are truly human or a benevolent offshoot of Silicon Life, the Dry Men exist as an aboriginal race in the megastructure. Their name – given to them by the Laborers – stems from the long cracks in their skin. They are often persecuted by organ harvesters, who trade them in for their low transplant rejection rate.
- Planters - Humans originally working as laborers in Toha Heavy Industries.
- Electrofishers (originally Denki-Ryoushi (電基漁師)) - A people descended from the Planters. They have been locked out for many generations, and have lost all knowledge about why they are there and what Toha is. Their appearance has evolved in that they have tribalized the traditional Planter armor with markings, beads and sashes. They are able to fight the Safeguard using powerful bolt-firing rifles similar to spear guns. The methods they use to survive is unknown, although it is implied that they have traveled throughout the megastructure surrounding Toha, scavenging. For a time they had the technology to preserve the personalities of deceased fishers and transfer them to new bodies. However, this skill has long died out by the time of their entrance into the narrative. The Electrofishers are a very short-statured race of humans, unlike Cibo who comes from a race that is very tall.
  - Zuru (づる), Voiced by: Sora Amamiya (Japanese); Christine Marie Cabanos (English)
  - Pop (おやっさん, Oyassan), Voiced by: Kazuhiro Yamaji (Japanese); Michael McConnohie (English)
  - Sutezō (捨造), Voiced by: Mamoru Miyano (Japanese); Keith Silverstein (English)

Electrofishers that appeared in the anime film:
- Tae (タエ), Voiced by: Aya Suzaki (Japanese); Cherami Leigh (English)
- Fusata (フサタ), Voiced by: Nobunaga Shimazaki (Japanese); Bryce Papenbrook (English)
- Atsuji (アツジ), Voiced by: Yūki Kaji (Japanese); Johnny Yong Bosch (English)

=== Minor characters ===
- Mensab - Mensab is the AI Controller for Cave 8 inside Toha Heavy Industries. She is expelled from the collective AI, although the reason is not exactly clear. She normally acts and appears quite calm, but her appearance also mirrors her mood. Also, as Cibo departs from Toha Heavy Industries, she bestows her with a small capsule containing Seu's genetic information which, surprisingly enough, can partially access the Netsphere.
- Seu - A Planter, who serves as Mensab's protector. He is a powerful swordsman and loyal bodyguard. Whenever he is severely injured, Mensab takes him to be restored by equipment which can heal any damage and also synthesize any substance (however, he loses memory each time he is healed in this way). As only Mensab's people survived the silicon creature invasion, and they were likely killed in the destruction of Toha Heavy Industries, Seu could have possibly been the last Planter alive. He eventually withdraws with Mensab and the recorded personalities of the remaining Planters into a time-space rift, ensuring their safety.
- Mori - A girl whose mind was downloaded into an emergency preservation pack resembling a USB drive. Her corpse sat undisturbed for a long time before Killy stumbled on it. Mori is not her name, and we never learn her real name. Mori was the name of the manufacturer of the emergency preservation pack, and was printed on the device itself. Killy, acting as a Good Samaritan, takes her along on his quest. Mori's main task, it seems, is to do most of the talking for Killy in Cibo's absence. Shortly after Killy obtains Cibo's 'child', Mori is taken by the Governing Agency to a storage area and recounts her adventures with Killy to other damaged digital consciousnesses.

== Factions or groups of note ==
- Safeguard - The Safeguard is the completely independent defense system of the Netsphere. The Safeguard's original purpose was to prevent unauthorized access to the Netsphere by those without Net Terminal Genes. However, due to the Order breeding and using humans without Net Terminal Genes to make more Silicon Life, the Safeguard have taken to destroying all humans without the Net Terminal Gene as a preemptive measure. Safeguard are often seen to materialise from the substance of the megastructure using structure conversion towers. Even humans have been turned into Safeguards after coming into contact with Safeguard weapons, notably the darts used by Sanakan. There are more powerful special agents, like Sanakan, Dhomochevsky, and Iko who may derive from core personalities uploaded into the Netsphere.
- Exterminators - A subset of Safeguard which is made up of black-and-white-colored, silicon-based, bio-mechanical, humanoid robots. These often use primitive, close-range weapons as a means of attack, but because of their formidable armor, it is not much of a problem. They come in different classes of power, though the hierarchy is never explained. The lowest, most common safeguard attacks with just its hands. A higher type attacks with larger, clawed hands, another with large shear-like weapons. The 'Class One Exterminator', encountered near the end of the series, eschews melee attacks for esoteric weaponry and the capacity to transform the City's structure itself. Safeguard Exterminators seem to run on a different protocol of command than the higher level of Safeguard such as Sanakan and/or Dhomochevsky (though Dhomo did have a contingent of them assigned to him before Schiff destroyed them). At one point, the Exterminator Class One even targets Sanakan as it deems her a threat or obstacle, but does not decide to kill her. It is up to speculation as to why - perhaps either it no longer saw her as a threat, or perhaps it was because she too was a Safeguard.
- Governing Agency or Authority (originally Touchikyoku (統治局)), Voiced by: Aki Toyosaki (anime film), Tatsunori Arakawa (ONA) - The ruling level of the Net Sphere. It tries at times to assist Killy and Cibo against the Cyborgs and against the Safeguard. It has powers identical to the Safeguard, but cannot directly control the Safeguard - although it can hinder them. It wants a human with the Net Terminal Gene to be found to stop the Builders which are the cause of the runaway growth of The City.
- Builders (originally Kensetsusha (建設者), meaning Architect) - Machines which construct The City. They are not connected directly to The Net Sphere or Safeguard; therefore a human with net terminal genes is only capable of their activation. They come in a wide variety of shapes and sizes. Killy remembers their language in the village of the Fishermen, and Cibo uses her knowledge about them to learn to control them completely. A group of builders in the higher megastructures of The City have been modified, possibly by long deceased humans, to behave socially, conversing with the beings they encounter and taking moderately humanoid appearances.

== Structures ==
- The Megastructure (originally chou-kozoutai (超構造体)) - These are large plates that lie between levels of The City and are made out of an unknown, nearly-indestructible material. They are part of some kind of major isolation system between the gargantuan floors of The City. Attempts to approach the megastructure result in a massive safeguard response so as to prevent trespassing. Only a direct Gravitational Beam Emitter blast is known to have been capable of tearing a hole into a megastructure.
- The Netsphere - A possible future incarnation of the internet available only to those with the Net Terminal Gene and guarded by the Safeguard. According to the opening of the Net Sphere Engineer, it was meant as a new world order, and could fulfill the desires of the people. It is posited in NOiSE that it was in fact a New Social Order designed to exclude the infected. It can only be accessed by those possessing Net Terminal Genes.
- Toha Heavy Industries (originally Toua-juukou (東亜重工)) - A massive edifice or possibly vehicle separate from the megastructure. Toha Heavy Industries was mentioned as the benevolent organization in Biomega as well as a mecha manufacturer in Knights of Sidonia. It is inhabited by humans known only as the 'planters', and is the origin of the splinter group, the 'fishers'. It is controlled by a central AI, and has a collective of thirteen other AIs; one controlling each cave. The Collective AI was created in an effort to prevent insanity, however, in the end it did not work out. The central AI shows increasingly irrational behavior with its use of teleportation technology, and its gravity furnace. The AI isolated itself from the outside using a treaty from the Governing Agency because of the seriousness of the Silicon Creature's disease, and excommunicated those who did. Toha Heavy Industries is crucial because the planters may be net gene carriers.
- Structure conversion towers - These buildings appear to be autonomous energy reserves and/or producers which are independent of the Megastructure. They are apparently capable of synthesising any form of matter, mainly Safeguard units. Davine Lu Linvega hijacks one and uses it to download various types of constructs, including special Exterminators which bear her face.

== Plot devices ==
- Net Terminal Genes (originally Net-tanmatsu-idenshi (ネット端末遺伝子)) - These are the special genes which allow those possessing them full access to the Netsphere. However, the Net Terminal Genes are incredibly rare by the time period where BLAME! begins. The Net Sphere protection agency, also called the Safeguard, is under standing orders to kill any human found who does not possess these genes; also, any illegal access to the Netsphere is responded to by downloading a Safeguard to the location of the illegal access point and having it kill the person who attempted access. As very few humans in BLAME! possess the Net Terminal Gene, the Safeguards are essentially under orders to kill all humans.
