= .45 Parabellum Bloodhound =

Upcoming video game

.45 Parabellum Bloodhound: Cyberpunk Active Time Action
- Cover art depicting Reila
- Developer: Sukeban Games
- Publisher: Sukeban Games
- Director: Christopher Ortiz
- Artists: Christopher Ortiz; Merengedoll
- Writer: Christopher Ortiz
- Composer: Juneji
- Engine: Unity
- Platform: Windows
- Release: 2026
- Mode: Single-player

.45 Parabellum Bloodhound: Cyberpunk Active Time Action (Note: Stylized in all caps) is an upcoming video game developed and published by Sukeban Games. It follows Reila Mikazuchi, a former mercenary attempting to return to her previous life. The player explores the game's world, interacts with non-playable characters, and engages in combat. The game's concept originated during game director and writer Christopher Ortiz's high school years. With this project, Ortiz aimed to minimize external influences to create a more distinctive experience compared to his 2016 game VA-11 Hall-A.

.45 Parabellum Bloodhound is scheduled to release for Windows in 2026.

== Gameplay ==
.45 Parabellum Bloodhound is described by Sukeban Games as an "active time action" game. The player controls Reila Mikazuchi, a former mercenary attempting to return to her previous life. The combat system combines real-time and turn-based elements, with the action bar's filling speed determined by both character and weapon statistics. Once the bar is full, the player can pause time to execute offensive moves. While exploring the game world, the player uncovers secrets, interacts with non-playable characters, and engages in boss fights at the end of each level.

== Development and release ==
The concept for .45 Parabellum Bloodhound was conceived by Sukeban Games' game director and writer Christopher Ortiz and the project's programmer during their high school years. Following the release of VA-11 Hall-A in 2016, Sukeban began working on its sequel, N1RV Ann-A. However, it was eventually put on hold as .45 Parabellum Bloodhound became the studio's primary project. Developed under the working title "Project D" since 2019, the game underwent several reboots, with the final iteration in progress since approximately 2022. Within about two years, the developers completed five of seven planned story chapters and finalized most of the game's features. While VA-11 Hall-A drew heavily on various inspirations, Ortiz aimed to minimize external influences for .45 Parabellum Bloodhound, except for the "initial spark" for the combat system, inspired by the 1998 game Parasite Eve, and other mechanics. He described the game as a "uniquely Sukeban experience". It is being developed using the Unity engine.

Announced in July 2024, .45 Parabellum Bloodhound was scheduled to release for Windows in the summer of 2026.
