= NOiSE =

Japanese manga series

- Tankōbon volume cover, featuring Susono Musubi on top of early Silicon Creatures
- Genre: Cyberpunk
- Manga
- Written by: Tsutomu Nihei
- Published by: Kodansha
- English publisher: NA: Tokyopop (former); Kodansha USA (current)
- Imprint: Afternoon KC
- Magazine: Afternoon Season Zōkan
- Original run: February 10, 2000 – May 10, 2001
- Volumes: 1
- icon

NOiSE is a Japanese manga series written and illustrated by Tsutomu Nihei. It was serialized in Kodansha's seinen manga magazine Afternoon Season Zōkan from February 2000 to May 2001, with its chapters collected in a single tankōbon volume. It is a prequel to his ten-volume work, Blame!, and offers some information concerning the Megastructure's origins and initial size, as well as the origins of Silicon Life.

== Plot ==
This story portrays Susono Musubi, a young police officer in a dystopian subterranean city thriving with activity, who is investigating recent child abductions. She finds a heavily toned down, sword-like Gravitational Beam Emitter as well as other elements that take different forms in the later publication (for example, Silicon Life).

== Publication ==
NOiSE, written and illustrated by Tsutomu Nihei, was serialized in Kodansha's seinen manga magazine Afternoon Season Zōkan from February 10, 2000, (Note: Debuted in the magazine's No. 2 issue, released on February 10, 2000.) to May 10, 2001. (Note: Finished in the magazine's No. 7 issue, released on May 10, 2001.) Kodansha collected its chapters in a single tankōbon volume, released on October 23, 2001. The volume also includes Blame, a one-shot prototype for Blame!, which originally debuted in the October 1995 issue of Monthly Afternoon. (Note: Released on August 25 of that same year.)

In North America, the manga was licensed for English release by Tokyopop, who released the single volume on December 11, 2007. The manga was later re-released by Kodansha USA in digital on June 28, 2016, and in print on November 29, 2022.
