= N1RV Ann-A =

- Developer: Sukeban Games
- Publishers: Ysbryd Games, Playism
- Platforms: macOS; Nintendo Switch; PlayStation 4; Windows
- Genres: Visual novel, business simulation
- Mode: Single-player

N1RV Ann-A (full title N1RV Ann-A: Cyberpunk Bartender Action) is an upcoming indie visual novel and bartending simulation developed by Sukeban Games, and published by Ysbryd Games and Playism. It is a sequel to the 2016 visual novel VA-11 Hall-A. The game takes place in an upscale bar in Saint Alicia, an "idyllic tourist paradise" and artificial island with a seedy, dystopian underbelly of crime. The main character, Sam, must care for her 8-year-old son while her relationship with her partner Leon, who moonlights as a yakuza, is faltering.

The game was initially announced on September 18, 2018, for a 2020 release on macOS, Nintendo Switch, PlayStation 4 and Windows. While highly anticipated, it was later delayed indefinitely due to creative differences and development burnout. This resulted in a "reset" of the project, and it is being worked on alongside other side projects at the studio.

== Development ==
The player speaking to the character Olivia, within the game's visual novel interface

Studio Sukeban Games is based in Venezuela. According to the developers, the protagonist, Sam, was made a mother with an upbeat personality to differentiate her from the previous game's main character, Jill Stingray. Unlike VA-11 Hall-A, which was based on PC-98 games, N1RV Ann-A was inspired by the graphics of PlayStation and Sega Saturn games. The game's animated cut-ins drew inspiration from Sakura Wars and Tokimeki Memorial. The setting was based on development team member Fernando Damas' experience visiting Japan.

On December 1, 2020, Damas announced the game's indefinite delay, blaming it on refusing to relinquish his role as the sole programmer despite going through major life events. This led to slow progress until the start of 2020, when the game was rebuilt from scratch by a different programmer. Afterwards, "creative differences" resulted in an internal conflict on how the story should progress, though he stated that the problems had been reconciled. He denied that other projects would "cannibalize" development of N1RV Ann-A, and said that they would be developed in parallel. In 2023, developer Christopher Ortiz stated that the game was still in production with no set release date. In a 2024 interview, Ortiz explained that work on N1RV Ann-A had largely been put on hold while Sukeban Games focused on a new project, .45 Parabellum Bloodhound, and that he expected development to "pick up dramatically" after its completion.

== Reception ==
In a preview from TGS 2018, Mamiya Tobe of Famitsu wrote that despite the shortness of the demo, it showed remarkable progress, and that it was a better bartending simulator than its predecessor thanks to the ability to offer real cocktails.

In a 2019 preview of the game, Kyle LeClair of Hardcore Gamer wrote that it was one of the most anticipated indie games at the time, calling that "not exactly a shocking revelation" due to VA-11 Hall-A's large fanbase. Calling the game "unique, engrossing and addictive", he noted that the "brighter character models and sets" made things seem more idyllic. He noted that the game's drink selection reflected its new setting, with real ingredients demonstrating it was a "rich man's playground". He noted that the game's drink making was more flexible, encouraging you to make your own blends based on the customer's tastes. He called the initial conversation with Parka, a famous erotic comic artist, about taboo subjects "surprisingly deep". He summed up the demo as an "effective hook" that left him wanting more.

In a later preview from PAX East 2020, Steve Tyminski of Shacknews wrote that a "welcome change" from the original was not having to shake drinks for a certain time, calling it "tedious" in the previous game. He noted that the writing was "pretty good", and that the character troubles sounded like problems real people would have. He also pointed out new reaction options to patrons besides simply serving them different drinks, saying that people would be "pleasantly surprised" if they tried out the game.
