= Lily Marriner-Dodds =

British game designer

- Born: December 1991 (age 34); Southend-on-Sea, Essex, England
- Occupation: Game Designer
- Children: 1
- Writing career
- Language: English
- Genres: Cyberpunk, fantasy
- Notable works: Carbon 2185 A Cyberpunk RPG, Dragon Drop Adventures

Lily Marriner-Dodds (born December, 1991), is a British trans woman tabletop role-playing game designer best known for creating Carbon 2185 | A Cyberpunk RPG which has been featured in New Scientist.

== Personal life ==
Marriner-Dodds was born in Southend-on-Sea, England. She studied Video game design at college and Computer science at university in Cambridge.

Marriner-Dodds has a sister, Cassandra Dodds and a daughter (born 2018).

Marriner-Dodds came out as Queer in October 2020 and as a transgender woman in 2026 via social media.

== Career ==
=== Dragon Turtle Games ===
Marriner-Dodds founded Dragon Turtle Games in 2016 while in Hong Kong. Between 2017 and 2018 through Dragon Turtle Games she wrote and published Dragon Drop Adventures 1, 2, and 3, a series of simple adventures for Dungeons & Dragons designed to be easy to run for new gamemasters. In 2019, after a successful crowdfunding campaign on Kickstarter Marriner-Dodds wrote and released Carbon 2185 | A Cyberpunk RPG. The crowdfunding campaign for Carbon 2185 reached more than 14 times the funding amount required to publish the game and was, at the time, the most funded cyberpunk project ever to appear on Kickstarter. Carbon 2185 went on to receive widespread acclaim and was featured in various publications such as Forbes, New Scientist, and RPGnet.

=== Studio Cerca ===
In early 2020 Marriner-Dodds and her sister Cassandra Dodds co-founded Studio Cerca. Through Studio Cerca, the siblings intend to write and publish family friendly Dungeons & Dragons 5th Edition Content inspired by the works of Japanese director Hayao Miyazaki and the films of Studio Ghibli.
