= Billy Goldberg =

Emergency medical physician (b. 1966)

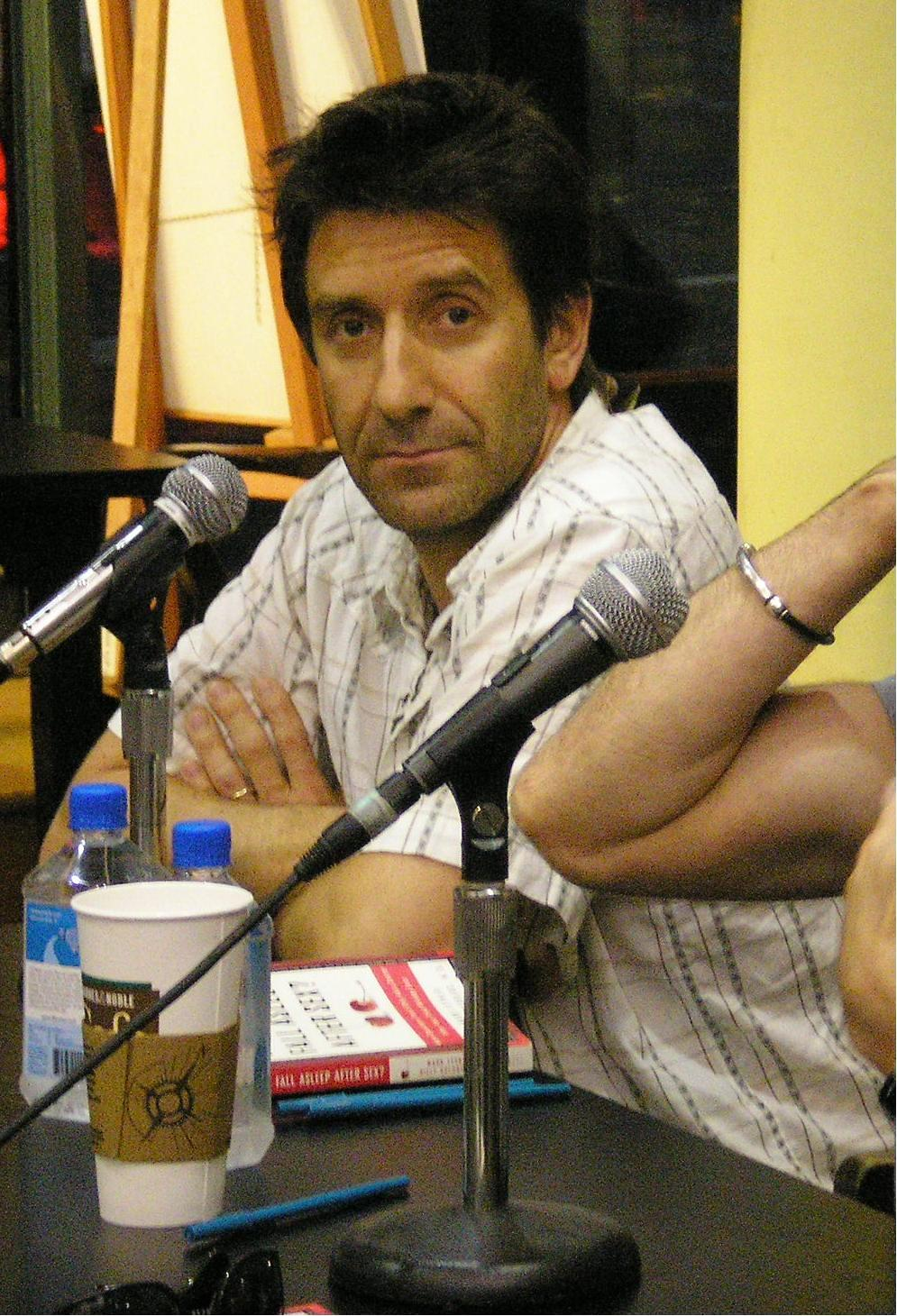
Goldberg discussing his new book with Mark Leyner in New York City, August 2006

Billy Goldberg (born April 10, 1966) is a New York City emergency medicine physician at the NYU School of Medicine (Bellevue Hospital and New York University (NYU) Medical Center) where he is also an Assistant Professor and an Assistant Director in the Department of Emergency Medicine. He graduated from the Albert Einstein College of Medicine in 1992.

He has collaborated with writer Mark Leyner on two books providing answers to commonly pondered, though discomforting, medical questions. The two plan on writing a third book to be released sometime in 2013. "That is if we're not dead from drinking all those martinis and whiskey sours" said Mark Leyner when interviewed about the upcoming book.

The books are:

- Why Do Men Have Nipples? Hundreds of Questions You'd Only Ask a Doctor After Your Third Martini (2005)
- Why Do Men Fall Asleep After Sex? More Questions You'd Only Ask a Doctor After Your Third Whiskey Sour (2006).

In September 2005, Nipples was #1 on the New York Times Bestselling Paperback Advice Books List.

Goldberg and Leyner attempt to answer questions such as, "What causes an ice cream headache?"; "Does it really take seven years to digest gum?"; and, "Why does your pee smell after eating asparagus?"

In an interview, Goldberg posits the philosophy behind the books: "We spend every moment walking around in this incredibly well-constructed but hard-to-figure-out machine that is our bodies. In everything we do — when we think, when we hear, when we smell, when we eat — there are these processes that are happening that we don’t understand. You can’t escape from having these moments thinking, how does it work?"
