= Virginia State Route 11 =

The following highways in Virginia have been known as State Route 11:

- State Route 11 (Virginia 1918-1933), originally Cumberland Gap to near Bluefield, West Virginia
- U.S. Route 11 in Virginia, 1926–present
