= Dystopika =

2024 video game

- Developer: Voids Within
- Publishers: Voids Within, UNIKAT Label
- Engine: Unity
- Platform: Microsoft Windows
- Release: June 21, 2024
- Genres: urban sandbox, cozy game
- Mode: Single-player

Dystopika is a city-building, sandbox, cozy game developed by Voids Within and released on June 21, 2024. The game allows the player to create cyberpunk-style cities with no goals or resource limits.

Critics praised the game for its relaxing atmosphere, cyberpunk aesthetic, lack of goals, and freedom, while others criticized it for a lack of direction and content.

== Gameplay ==
Example city

Each player starts with a plot of land and the freedom to start wherever they like. There is no laid out path as the game has no management mechanics. On the left-hand side, there is a simple user interface with a list of tools and buildings that can be placed, organized by different districts. Buildings can be edited using tools to rotate, change the size and height, and alter their appearance, while existing buildings can be demolished. The game uses procedural generation, which creates smaller structures near the placed buildings or bridges between buildings. Building decorations can also be added, such as holographic figures, neon signs, company logos, or advertising airships. A built-in progression system makes more objects available as the player places and decorates more buildings. Players can also use a brush to paint neon lights and advertisements, or import their own images as decorations.

In June 2025, an update called Meditations was released, adding more content and tools. Another update in October 2025 added modding support for player-created content.

== Development and release ==
Canadian-based studio Voids Within, a solo project of Matt Marshall, developed Dystopika over the course of three years. Marshall had traveled for several years through Asian countries including Japan, Thailand, and Vietnam, and was impressed by the futuristic aesthetics of megacities he visited, such as Hanoi, Osaka, and Bangkok. Returning to Canada, he conceived of a game based around a visually appealing sandbox for panoramas. Marshall said that he had long enjoyed playing games like SimCity, but with cheat codes so players wouldn't have to worry about a limited budget, economy, or citizens' well-being. He was influenced to develop Dystopika by the success of small urban sandboxes. He was a long-term fan of cyberpunk, and had previously attempted to develop several games within it. The city's visual style was also inspired by films such as Blade Runner, Ghost in the Shell, Altered Carbon, and Cyberpunk 2077.

The demo was released in March 2024 during Steam's NextFest. A trailer for the game was released on the IGN website and its YouTube channel. The release was delayed from March 2024 to June. Marshall decided not to engage with his publisher, and instead promote the game independently. Despite extremely positive reviews on Steam, the game failed to make large sales, with an all-time peak of 258 players as of June 2024. Marshall promised to add more game content, taking into account requests from the community on Discord. It was also released on the Steam Deck.

== Critical reception ==
Reception

Aggregate score
Aggregator	Score
Metacritic	79/100

Dystopika received generally favorable reviews from critics, according to the review aggregation website Metacritic.

Critics reviewed Dystopika generally positively, praising its relaxing tone, use of the cyberpunk aesthetic, photo mode, and core concept. The ambient soundtrack was often highlighted as a key factor behind the calming atmosphere. However, some criticism was directed at the game's unintuitive user interface (UI), limited content, and perceived lack of depth.

The game's lack of traditional goals, an economy, or challenges was a major point of discussion among reviewers. Some critics praised this design choice, viewing Dystopika as a representative of a niche, relaxing genre. A New Game Network critic called the game a "suitable compromise" for players who enjoy complex city-building games like Cities: Skylines, Anno, or Surviving Mars but prefer the creative process rather than the management aspect. Similarly, a critic from WellPlayed described the experience as akin to "playing a lo-fi playlist", emphasizing its simple and meditative quality. However, other reviewers cited the absence of mechanics as the game's main flaw, suggesting it led the game to feel empty or limited. A Finger Guns critic described it as more of an interactive piece of art than a game, suggesting it could become boring after a few hours and is not suitable for players who prefer more task-based games. Critic Digital Chumps argued that the game's longevity problem may not be because of a lack of content but rather that the player can unlock all the content rather quickly.

Reviews of the visuals and the building editor were also varied. Some reviewers praised the visual effects and the attention to detail. Tryhardguides particularly praised the "fog trick", which appeared to hide roads that do not exist in the game. However, a critic from New Game Network criticized the inability to see the streets, and some players expressed dissatisfaction with the limited visuals and overly static environments. Regarding the editor, some critics said they simply enjoyed the process of city-building and appreciated the mechanic of unlocking items as they progressed, while others found the construction and terrain editor too limited. A critic from GodisaGeek said the game would be improved by the ability to work with more diverse landscapes and to see how the city adapts to the terrain.

== Links ==
- Official website
