= Mark Leyner =

American author (born 1956)

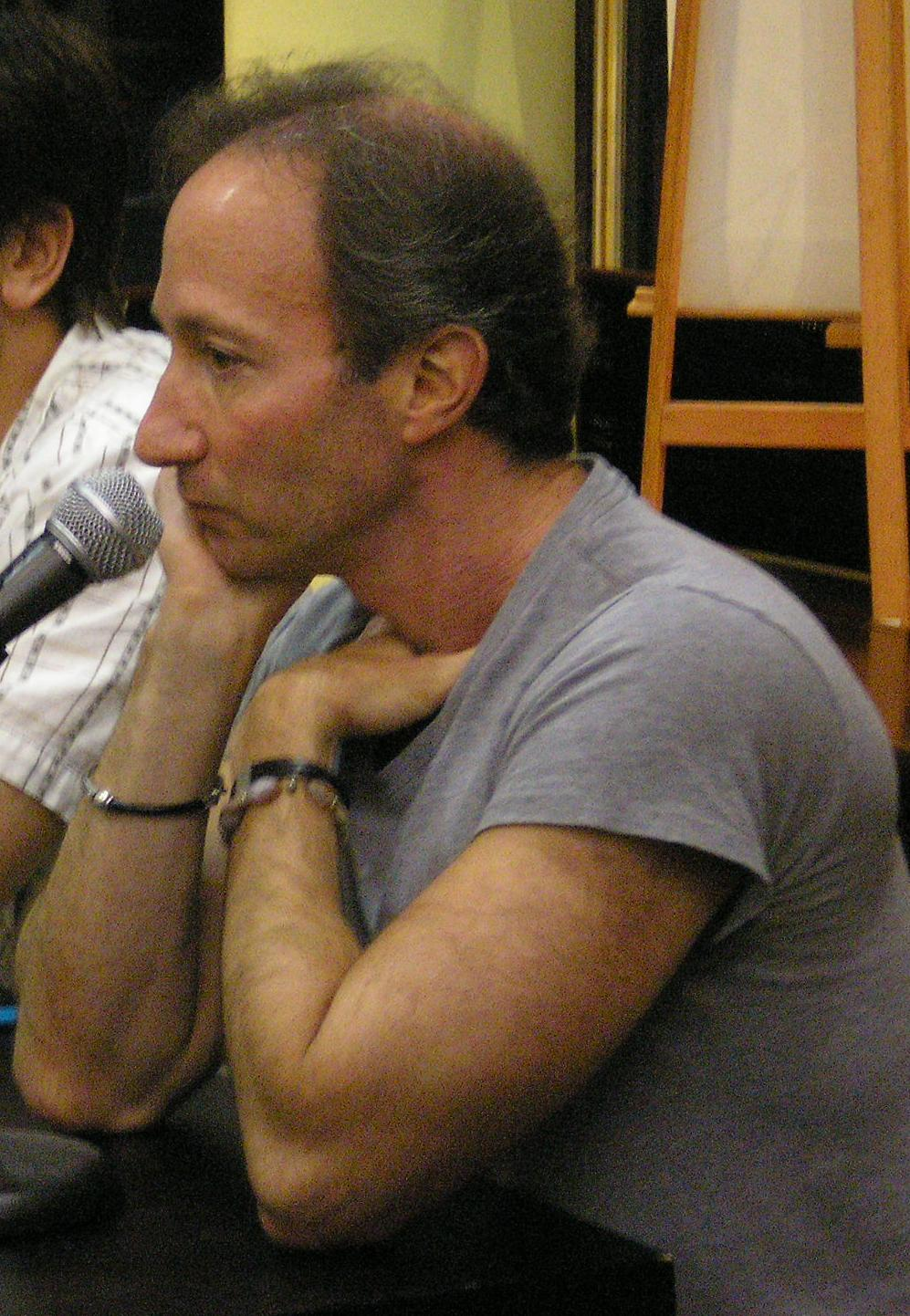
- Leyner in 2006
- Born: January 4, 1956 (age 70); Jersey City, New Jersey, U.S.
- Education: Brandeis University (BA); University of Colorado (MFA)
- Occupation: Writer
- Writing career
- Language: English

Mark Leyner (born January 4, 1956) is an American postmodernist author.

== Biography ==
Mark Leyner was born in Jersey City, NJ, to a Jewish family. He is the son of Joel and Muriel (née Chasan) Leyner, who had divorced by 1997. Leyner received a B.A. from Brandeis University in 1977 and an M.F.A. from University of Colorado in 1979. He was briefly married to Arleen Portada, before marrying his second wife, Mercedes, and having a daughter, Gabrielle.

Leyner employs an intense and unconventional style in his works of fiction. His stories are generally humorous and absurd, with bizarre juxtapositions of people, places and things reminiscent of a Mad Lib. Leyner incorporates many medical references throughout his work.

In The Tetherballs of Bougainville, Mark's father survives a lethal injection at the hands of the New Jersey penal system, and so is freed but must live the remainder of his life in fear of being executed, at New Jersey's discretion, in any situation and regardless of collateral damage. They frequently incorporate elements of meta-fiction: In the same novel, an adolescent Mark produces a film adaptation of the story of his father's failed execution, although he reads a newspaper review of the movie to the prison's warden, and then dies, before even leaving the prison. At the sentence level, Leyner uses sprawling imagery and an extravagant vocabulary, bordering on prose poetry.

Leyner has also worked as a columnist for Esquire and George magazines, and as a writer for the MTV program Liquid Television. He also co-wrote and voiced a short-lived series of audio fiction called Wiretap.

Leyner also studied with noted post-modern author Steve Katz at the University of Colorado-Boulder.

During the 1990s, Leyner was a resident of Hoboken, New Jersey, together with his dog Carmella.

In the mid-to-late 2000s, Leyner collaborated with Dr. Billy Goldberg on three humorous, though fact-based, books on medicine.

== Filmography ==
He is credited with co-authoring the screenplay of War, Inc.

== Selected works ==
- Novels
  - Et Tu, Babe (1992)
  - The Tetherballs of Bougainville (1998)
  - The Sugar Frosted Nutsack (2012)
  - Gone with the Mind (2016)
  - Last Orgy of the Divine Hermit (2021); reprinted as Daughter (Waiting for Her Drunk Father to Return from the Men's Room) (2022)
- Short story collections:
  - I Smell Esther Williams and Other Stories (1983)
  - My Cousin, My Gastroenterologist (1990)
  - Tooth Imprints on a Corn Dog (1996)
- Non-fiction
  - Why Do Men Have Nipples? Hundreds of Questions You'd Only Ask a Doctor After Your Third Martini (2005)
  - Why Do Men Fall Asleep After Sex? More Questions You'd Only Ask a Doctor After Your Third Whiskey Sour (2006)
  - Let's Play Doctor: The Instant Guide to Walking, Talking, and Probing like a Real M.D. (2008)
- Anthologies
  - A Shimmering, Serrated Monster!: The Mark Leyner Reader (2024)
