= My Cousin, My Gastroenterologist =

1990 book written by Mark Leyner

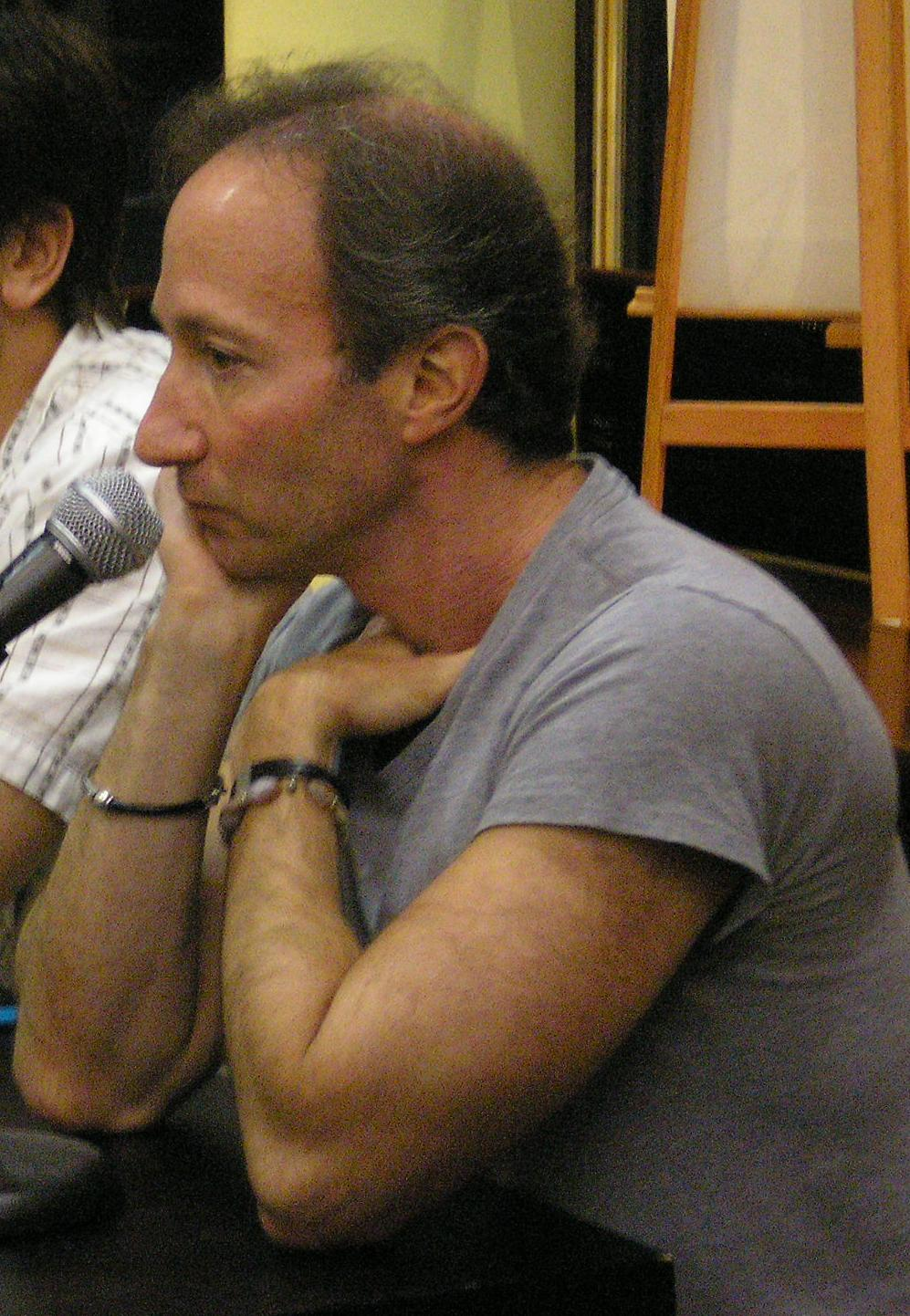
Author Mark Leyner

My Cousin, My Gastroenterologist is a postmodernist/absurdist book written by Mark Leyner, published by Vintage Contemporaries in 1990. Portions of it were originally published in Fiction International, Rolling Stock, Hallwalls Anthology, Esquire and Harper's Magazine before being compiled into its current form.

The book is composed of 17 loosely related chapters with no general storyline. It is voiced in first-person by an anonymous narrator often using jargon, broken grammar, and punctuation with a poetry-like structure. The narration shifts quickly between random ideas with little to no connectivity between them, typically giving vivid descriptions of abstract situations. The narrative styles in the book vary significantly as well, with no apparent solid identity to the narrator itself. Some characters and ideas emerge suddenly and disappear without explanation.

Within this form, elements of science fiction, cyberpunk, tabloid journalism, and advertising slogans are incorporated. Due to its use of pop-culture references (e.g., to kung fu films) and literary allusions, it requires knowledge of then-current affairs. Leyner resorts to irony and humor as a means of interplay with traditional realism.
