= Fragile Machine =

- DVD cover
- Directed by: Ben Steele
- Written by: Darren Dugan; John Pinckney; Ben Steele
- Starring: Molly Pinckney; Xi
- Music by: John Banks; John Hockersmith; Ben Steele; Jay Steinberg
- Release date: 2005
- Running time: 34 minutes
- Country: United States
- Languages: Japanese; English

Fragile Machine is an indie cyberpunk short film created by a team of artists called Aoineko.

== Plot ==
Leda Nea is a scientist working for the Göln Remedios laboratory. Following the death of her daughter, Leda volunteers as a test subject in a series of experiments designed to mesh human and machine.

== Reception ==
Fragile Machine was premiered at the Waterloo Festival for Animated Cinema in 2005

Fragile Machine was well received at various film festivals, winning accolades such as:

"Best Animated File Award (2005): The Sedona International Film Festival
"Special Tribute for Animation (2005): Imaginaria
"Honorable Mention for Work in Progress (2005): DIY Film Festival

Reviews of Fragile Machine were generally positive. Brett D. Rogers of fps Magazine called the film "a well-styled piece of visual and audio cyberpunk, setting lessons learned from Blade Runner, Ghost in the Shell and Metropolis to a beat."
