= Blame! =

Japanese manga series

- First tankōbon volume cover, featuring Killy
- Genre: Action; Cyberpunk; Post-apocalyptic
- Manga
- Written by: Tsutomu Nihei
- Published by: Kodansha
- English publisher: NA: Tokyopop (former); Vertical (current); UK: Tokyopop
- Imprint: Afternoon KC
- Magazine: Monthly Afternoon
- Original run: January 25, 1997 – July 25, 2003
- Volumes: 10
Further information
Original net animation
Blame! Ver. 0.11
Directed by	Shintarō Inokawa
Produced by	Kazuki Nakamura
Written by	Mayori Sekijima
Music by	Hiroyuki Onogawa; KIYOSHI (BORN'S) (#3)
Studio	Group TAC
Licensed by	NA: AnimeWorks
Released	October 24, 2003
Runtime	6 minutes (each)
Episodes	6 + OVA
Manga
Blame Academy!
Written by	Tsutomu Nihei
Published by	Kodansha
Imprint	Afternoon KC
Magazine	Monthly Afternoon
Original run	March 25, 2004 – March 25, 2008
Volumes	1
Manga
NetSphere Engineer
Written by	Tsutomu Nihei
Published by	Kodansha
Magazine	Bessatsu Morning
Published	December 16, 2004
Original net animation
Blame! Prologue
Directed by	Shigeyuki Watanabe
Music by	Yuichi Nonaka
Studio	Production I.G
Released	September 7, 2007
Runtime	4 minutes
Episodes	2
Manga
Blame!2
Written by	Tsutomu Nihei
Published by	Kodansha
Magazine	Mandala
Published	March 21, 2008
Manga
Blame! The Electrofishers' Escape
Written by	Kotaro Sekine
Published by	Kodansha
Imprint	Sirius KC
Magazine	Monthly Shōnen Sirius
Original run	April 26, 2017 – October 26, 2017
Volumes	1
- Anime film
- Blame! (2017)
- icon

Blame! (Note: Pronounced "Blam!"; the official title is a misspelling of the onomatopoeia, according to Tsutomu Nihei.) (stylized in all caps) is a Japanese manga series written and illustrated by Tsutomu Nihei. It was serialized in Kodansha's seinen manga magazine Monthly Afternoon from January 1997 to July 2003, with its chapters collected in ten tankōbon volumes. A six-part original net animation (ONA) by Group TAC was produced in 2003, with a seventh episode included on the DVD release. An anime film adaptation by Polygon Pictures was released as a Netflix original in May 2017.

== Synopsis ==
=== Setting ===
Double page from Blame!

Blame! is set in "The City", a gigantic megastructure occupying much of what used to be the Solar System. Its exact size is unknown, but Tsutomu Nihei suggested its diameter to be at least equal to Jupiter's orbit, or about 1.6 billion kilometers (a detail suggested in the manga by having Killy cross an empty, spherical room roughly the size of Jupiter, suggesting that it had housed the planet before its disassembly).

According to the prequel manga NOiSE, the City began as a much smaller structure erected on Earth by the robotic "Builders". Humanity controlled the Builders through the Netsphere, an advanced computer network whose access was restricted to human use only, and authenticated by a genetic marker known as the Net Terminal Gene. Anyone who attempted to access the Netsphere without the marker was eliminated by an automated security force known as the Safeguards. However, a terrorist cult known as "the Order" released a retrovirus that deleted the Net Terminal Gene from all humans, thus cutting off their access to the Netsphere and their control over the Builders. Without specific instructions, the Builders began to build chaotically and indefinitely, while the Safeguards' programming degraded into a mandate to kill all humans without the Net Terminal Gene, whether they wanted to access the Netsphere or not.

By the time of the events of the manga, the City has come to resemble a series of layered, concentric Dyson spheres, filled with haphazard architecture and largely devoid of life. These layers compose the supporting scaffold of the City, known as the Megastructure; the underside of each layer periodically illuminates the overside of the one below to provide a day–night cycle. The Megastructure is extremely durable, with only a direct blast from a Gravitational Beam Emitter being able to penetrate it. Travel between layers is challenging, due to both the City's chaotic layout and the risk of provoking a Safeguard response; due to the size of the City, it is also extremely time-consuming, despite such amenities as elevators that can reach relativistic speeds. The buildings on each layer are largely uninhabited, although scattered human and post-human tribes, rogue Builders, hostile Safeguards, and Silicon Life can be found throughout the entire City.

=== Plot ===
Killy, a silent loner possessing an incredibly powerful weapon known as a Gravitational Beam Emitter, wanders a vast technological world known as "The City". He is searching for Net Terminal Genes, a (possibly) extinct genetic marker that allows humans to access the "Netsphere", a sort of computerized control network for The City. The City is an artificial structure of immense volume, separated into massive "floors" by nearly-impenetrable barriers known as "Megastructure". The City is inhabited by scattered human and transhuman tribes as well as hostile cyborgs known as Silicon Life. The Net Terminal Genes appear to be the key to halting the unhindered, chaotic expansion of the Megastructure, as well as a way of stopping the murderous robot horde known as the Safeguard from destroying all of humanity.

Along the way, Killy meets and joins forces with a resourceful engineer named Cibo. Their quest is indirectly supported by the City's Authority, which is unable to stop the Safeguard from opposing them. Together, Killy and Cibo meet a young girl named Sanakan and a tribe of human warriors called the Electro-Fishers. Killy's cybernetic abilities are restored after he is attacked by a high-level Safeguard, which turns out to have been Sanakan in disguise. She transforms into her Safeguard form and attacks the Electro-Fishers' village when discovered. Killy and Cibo defend the Electro-Fishers by bringing them to the cylindrical megastructure of Toha Heavy Industries. Here they meet Mensab, an AI independent from the Administration, and her guardian Seu, a human. The megastructure is ultimately destroyed due to attacks by Silicon Life and Sanakan, but Mensab is able to give Cibo a sample of Seu's DNA.

Killy and Cibo next come to a region of the City ruled by a group of Silicon Life, where they ally with a pair of "provisional Safeguards" named Dhomochevsky and Iko. Seu's DNA is stolen by the Silicon leader, Davine, who uses it to access the Netsphere. Dhomochevsky sacrifices his life to kill Davine, but not before she downloads an extremely powerful Level 9 Safeguard from the Netsphere which manifests in Cibo's body. The Cibo Safeguard destroys the entire region.

14 years later, Killy's body repairs itself from the attack and he continues his journey. He meets a human whose physical body is dead and whose consciousness is preserved in a device resembling a USB stick, and takes her with him. Upon eventually finding Cibo again he discovers that she, having lost her memory, was eventually rescued by Sanakan, who is now allied with the Authority against the rest of the Safeguard. Cibo's body is incubating a "sphere" which contains both her and Sanakan's genetic information. Ultimately, Cibo and Sanakan both die in a final confrontation with the Safeguard, but Killy survives and preserves the sphere. The digital consciousness Killy picked up earlier is seen in human form in the Netsphere, recounting Killy's quest to other entities an unknown amount of time in the future. She is told that Killy's journey to the outside of the City will be longer and harder than anything that came before. Killy finally reaches the edge of the City, where he is shot in the head and incapacitated, but a flood of water carries him to the surface of the City where stars are visible and the sphere begins to glow. In the final page, Killy is seen fighting in the corridors of the City again, alongside a small child wearing a hazmat suit.

== Media ==
=== Manga ===
Blame! was written and illustrated by Tsutomu Nihei. It originated as a one-shot prototype titled Blame, submitted for the Summer 1995 Afternoon Shiki Shō where it won the Jiro Taniguchi Special Prize, and published in Kodansha's seinen manga magazine Monthly Afternoon on August 25, 1995. (Note: Published in the magazine's October 1995 issue, released on August 25 of that same year.) It was later officially serialized in Monthly Afternoon from January 25, 1997, (Note: Debuted in the magazine's March 1997 issue, released on January 25 of that same year.) to July 25, 2003. (Note: Finished in the magazine's September 2003 issue, released on July 25 of that same year.) Its chapters, referred to as "logs", were collected in ten tankōbon volumes under Kodansha's Afternoon KC imprint.

In February 2005, Tokyopop announced that it has licensed Blame! for U.S. distribution, with publication beginning in August 2005. After releasing the final volume in 2007, the series has gone out of print with several volumes becoming increasingly hard to find. In February 2016, Vertical announced that it had licensed the series.

==== Volumes ====
Tankōbon release

No.	Original release date	Original ISBN	English release date	English ISBN
1	June 23, 1998	978-4-06-314182-5	August 9, 2005	978-1-59532-834-2
1. "Net Terminal Gene" (ネット端末遺伝子, Netto Tanmatsu Idenshi); 2. "The Memory of Land" (大地の記憶, Daichi no Kioku); 3. "Technomads" (テクノ遊牧民, Tekuno Yūbokumin); Ex-Log; 4. "The Administration" (統治局, Tōchi-kyoku); 5. "Escape" (脱出, Dasshutsu); 6. "Silicon Life" (珪素生命, Keiso Seimei); 7. "The Builders" (建設者, Kensetsu-sha)
2	December 18, 1998	978-4-06-314194-8	November 8, 2005	978-1-59532-835-9
Ex-Log: "Abandoned Nest" (廃巣, Hai Su); 8. "The Cluster" (塊都, Kai-to); 9. "Bio-Electric, Inc." (生電社, Seidensha); 10. "The Netsphere" (ネット球, Netto-kyū); 11. "Safeguards" (セーフガード, Sēfugādo)
3	August 23, 1999	978-4-06-314218-1	February 7, 2006	978-1-59532-836-6
12. "Storage King" (大嚢王(ダイノウオウ), Dainōō); 13. "Electro-Fishers" (電基漁師, Den Ki Ryōshi); 14. "Planters" (植民者(プランター), Purantā); 15. "Awakening" (覚醒, Kakusei); 16. "The Attack" (襲撃, Shūgeki); 17. "Language Matrix" (言語基体, Gengo Kitai); 18. "Annihilation" (殲滅, Senmetsu)
4	March 23, 2000	978-4-06-314235-8	May 9, 2006	978-1-59532-837-3
19. "The Backup World" (予備電子界, Yobi Denshi-kai); 20. "Restriction Lifted" (禁圧解除, Kinatsu Kaijo); 21. "The Hybrid" (混生体(ハイブリッド), Haiburiddo); 22. "Toha Heavy Industries" (東亜重工(トウアジュウコウ), Tōa Jūkō); 23. "The Digital Knight" (電基騎士, Den Ki Kishi); 24. "The Eighth Cave" (第8空洞(THE EIGHTH CAVE), Dai Hachi Kūdō)
5	September 22, 2000	978-4-06-314251-8	August 8, 2006	978-1-59532-838-0
25. "Hacking" (ハッキング, Hakkingu); 26. "The Unstable Cave" (飛散空洞, Hisan Kūdō); 27. "The Gravity Reactor" (重力炉, Jūryoku-ro); 28. "Version"; 29. "The Thirteenth Cave" (第13空洞, Dai Jūsan Kūdō); 30. "Endless War" (絶戦, Zessen)
6	March 23, 2001	978-4-06-314263-1	November 7, 2006	978-1-59532-839-7
31. "Sanakan and Cibo" (サナカンとシボ, Sanakan to Shibo); 32. "Vibrations" (振動, Shindō); 33. "Collapse" (決壊, Kekkai); 34. "Meltdown" (熔融, Yōyū); 35. "Annihilated" (消滅, Shōmetsu); 36. "Beautiful Life"; 37. "The Unofficial Megastructure" (非公式超構造体(アンオフィシャルメガストラクチャー), Anofisharu Megasutorakuchā)
7	October 23, 2001	978-4-06-314277-8; 978-4-06-336342-5 (LE)	February 13, 2007	978-1-59532-840-3
38. "The Warehouse" (集積蔵, Shūseki Zō); 39. "Type 1 Unknown Criticality Weapon" (第一種臨界不測兵器, Dai Ichi-shu Rinkai Fusoku Heiki); 40. "Captured" (捕獲, Hokaku); 41. "Anti-Inflitration Electronic Space" (侵入対攻電子空間, Shinnyū Taikō Denshi Kūkan); 42. "Internal Fissures in the Megastructure" (超構造体内部亀裂, Chō Kōzōtai Naibu Kiretsu); 43. "Provisional Safeguards" (臨時セーフガード, Rinji Sēfugādo)
8	April 23, 2002	978-4-06-314289-1	May 8, 2007	978-1-59532-841-0
44. "Inside the Megastructure" (超構造体内部, Chō Kōzōtai Naibu); 45. "Compound Dynamic Particles" (複散分子動体, Fukusan Bunshi Dōtai); 46. "Temporary Access Authentication" (仮接続認証線, Kari Setsuzoku Ninshō-sen); 47. "Inflitration" (侵入, Shinnyū); 48. "Impulse" (衝動, Shōdō); 49. "Level 9"; 50. "Distant" (遼遠, Ryōen)
9	December 20, 2002	978-4-06-314310-2	August 7, 2007	978-1-59532-842-7
51. "Parallel Battery Storage Cluster" (並列蓄電槽群, Heiretsu Chikuden-sō-gun); 52. "The One Who Calls" (呼ぶ者, Yobu Mono); 53. "Omission" (欠漏, Ketsurō); 54. "Captors" (捕獲者, Hokaku-sha); 55. "Reunion" (再会, Saikai); 56. "People" (人々, Hitobito); 57. "The Observer" (観測者, Kansoku-sha)
10	September 22, 2003	978-4-06-314328-7	November 13, 2007	978-1-59532-843-4
58. "Unbroken Wiring" (無隔金属線, Mu Kakkin Zoku-sen); 59. "The Continuum" (連続体, Renzokutai); 60. "Organical" (オーガニカル, Ōganikaru); 61. "Burning Silicon" (珪素生物襲撃(バーニングシリコン), Bāningu Shirikon); 62. "Receptor Recapture" (受容体奪還, Juyō-tai Dakkan); 63. "High-Level Exterminators" (上位駆除系(じょういくじょけい), Jōi Kujo-kei); 64. "Recovered Personality" (回収された人格, Kaishū Sareta Jinkaku); 65. "Omission" (都市の果て, Toshi no Hate)

Master edition volumes

No.	Original release date	Original ISBN	English release date	English ISBN
1	April 23, 2015	978-4-06-377201-2	September 13, 2016	978-1-68233-378-5 (digital); 978-1-94299-377-3 (print)
2	April 23, 2015	978-4-06-377202-9	December 13, 2016	978-1-68233-497-3 (digital); 978-1-94299-378-0 (print)
3	May 22, 2015	978-4-06-377203-6	March 21, 2017	978-1-68233-612-0 (digital); 978-1-94299-379-7 (print)
4	May 22, 2015	978-4-06-377204-3	June 20, 2017 (digital); June 27, 2017 (print)	978-1-68233-624-3 (digital); 978-1-94299-380-3 (print)
5	June 23, 2015	978-4-06-377210-4	September 12, 2017	978-1-68233-856-8 (digital); 978-1-94299-381-0 (print)
6	June 23, 2015	978-4-06-377211-1	December 12, 2017	978-1-68233-993-0 (digital); 978-1-94299-382-7 (print)

==== Blame Academy! ====
Blame Academy! (ブラム学園!, Buramu Gakuen!) is a spin-off series of Blame! Set in the same "City" as Blame!, it is a parody and comedy about various characters in the main Blame! story in a traditional Japanese school setting. Various elements in the main Blame! story are being parodied, including the relationship between Killy and Cibo, and Dhomochevsky and Iko. It was irregularly published in Monthly Afternoon from March 25, 2004, to March 25, 2008. A compilation volume, titled Blame Academy! and So On (ブラム学園! アンドソーオン, Buramu Gakuen! Ando Sō On) was published by Kodansha on September 19, 2008.

==== Blame!2 ====
Blame!2 (ブラム!2, Buramu! Tsū; stylized as BLAME!²), subtitled Chronicle of the Escape from the Megastructure by the Eighth Incarnation of Pcell (第八系子体プセルの都市構造体脱出記, Dai-hachi Keikotai Puseru no Toshikōzōtai Dasshutsu Ki), is a full-color, 16-page one-shot. Like NSE: NetSphere Engineer, Blame!2 is a sequel to the original Blame!, taking place at a point in the distant future. It was published March 21, 2008, in the second volume of Kodansha's Weekly Morning Special Edition magazine, Mandala. This one-shot was also compiled in one volume with Blame Academy!, titled Blame Academy! and So On in 2008. Set an undefined but long time after the events of Blame!, it follows an incarnation of Pcell. After Killy's success in Blame!, humanity has begun to dominate The City once more and began wiping out most Silicon Life. After P-cell escapes the extinction as the sole survivor of her kind (which is beset by humanity and the Safeguard), she is saved from death by Killy. She eventually makes it to the edge of the City, where it is implied she travels to another planet and restarts Silicon Life civilization using the stored gene-data of her dead companions.

==== NSE: NetSphere Engineer ====
NSE: NetSphere Engineer (ネットスフィアエンジニア, Netto Sufia Enjinia) is a sequel to Blame! It was originally published as a one-shot in the Bessatsu Morning magazine. This one-shot was compiled in one volume with Blame Academy!, titled Blame Academy! and So On in 2008. NSE: NetSphere Engineer follows a "Dismantler", a NetSphere Engineer in charge of disabling the remaining nexus towers that summon Safeguard interference upon its detection of humans without the net terminal genes. Like Blame!2, NSE is set in a long but undefined time period after the events of Blame! However, it is implied it is even later than Blame!2 as Safeguards are now very rare encounters.

==== Blame! The Electrofishers' Escape ====
A manga adaptation of the Blame! film, titled Blame! The Electrofishers' Escape (BLAME! 電基漁師危険階層脱出作戦, Buramu! Denki Ryōshi Kiki Kaisō Dasshutsu Sakusen) and illustrated by Kotaro Sekine, was serialized in Kodansha's Monthly Shōnen Sirius from April 26 to October 26, 2017. Its chapters were collected into one volume, released on February 9, 2018.

=== Blame!: The Ancient Terminal City ===
A trailer revealing a special Blame! short, appearing at the beginning of the 8th episode of Knights of Sidonia: Battle for Planet Nine (the second season of the anime adaptation of Knights of Sidonia), was released in November 2014. The episode aired in May 2015. The short is contextualized as a TV program that the people of Sidonia tune in for.

=== Film ===
Plans for a full-length CG animated film were announced in 2007. However, this proposed CG film project was not released before Micott and Basara (the studio hired) filed for bankruptcy in 2011. It was announced in November 2015 that the series would get an anime theatrical film adaptation. The film is directed by Hiroyuki Seshita and written by Tsutomu Nihei and Sadayuki Murai, with animation by Polygon Pictures and character designs by Yuki Moriyama. It was released globally as a Netflix original on May 20, 2017.

On October 5, 2017, Viz Media announced at their New York Comic Con panel that they licensed the home video rights to the film. They released it on DVD and Blu-ray on March 27, 2018.

== Reception ==
Jarred Pine from Mania.com commented "[it] is not an easy task" to talk about the story in the first volume as "it leaves quite a gamut of questions open for the reader, nothing on the surface to give the reader a sense of direction or purpose". Pine said Blame! does not have a mass appeal and "there will be quite a strong line dividing those who love and hate Nihei's unique and convoluted cyberpunk journey". Reviewing the manga in Manga: The Complete Guide, writer Jason Thompson declared it as "one of the greatest gothic/cyberpunk settings ever drawn" despite some repetitiveness in its action, comparing it to "an extended nightmare, or a really good video game."

In 2006, the Tokyopop distribution was nominated for a Harvey Award in the category "Best American Edition of Foreign Material".
