= Vector (video game) =

2012 platformer game

- Developer: Nekki
- Publisher: Nekki
- Engine: Unity
- Platforms: Android, iOS, Windows, Web browser
- Release: August 28, 2012
- Genre: Platform
- Mode: Single-player

Vector is a 2012 side-scrolling platform game developed and published by Cyprus-based studio Nekki for Windows, Android, iOS and Web browser. The objective of the game is to break free from the cycle as a free runner.

== Plot ==
Vector revolves around a silhouette protagonist who lives in a dystopian world controlled by “the system” through a mind control device implanted in the brains of the people. When the protagonist knocks out his implant, and the working networks cannot keep him calm, he uses the parkour skills in order to escape the city before getting captured by the hunters sent by the "Big Brother.”

== Reception ==
Damien McFerran of Pocket Gamer rated 8 out of 10 stars for the Android version and wrote that Vector's playability makes up for its lack of innovation. In their review of the iOS version, Slide to Play wrote "Vector is a fantastic free-running simulation with plenty to love", though the reviewer described the gameplay as "a bit repetitive at times". Reviewing the Facebook version, Pete Davison of Adweek's SocialTimes blog called it "an impressive game in all respects" but said it needs better social features. Leif Johnson reviewed the Facebook version for Gamezebo and rated 4 out of 5 stars. Johnson described the gameplay as occasionally grindy but concluded that the game is "fun stuff, and much more challenging than your run-of-the mill Facebook fare." Cameron Woolsey of GameSpot rated 7 out of 10 stars for the PC version and wrote that the game is "a fast-paced joyride" when it does annoy with its grind.

== Sequel ==
Vector 2
- Developer: Nekki
- Publisher: Nekki
- Platforms: Android iPhone iPad
- Release: WW: May 18, 2016
- Genre: Arcade game
- Mode: Single-player

The game received a 2016 sequel titled Vector 2, which continues that the protagonist was eventually captured by security forces and the antagonists decides to use his skills to test some new equipment inside a research facility known as "The Complex", which secretly performs cloning experiments.

Gameplay similar to the previous game and several tricks return such as "Swallow", "Screwdriver", "Dash Vault", "Obstacle Jump", "Rocket Vault", "Ralflip Vault", "Reverse Vault" and many more.

=== Spinoffs ===
With the success of Vector, Nekki decided to create another game like it that used a silhouette as the main protagonist. That game became a fighting game titled Shadow Fight, released exclusively on Facebook in 2011. This spiritual successor to Vector eventually became a trilogy, spawning two sequels that became available on iOS and Android in 2014 and 2017.
