= VA-11 Hall-A =

2016 video game

VA-11 Hall-A: Cyberpunk Bartender Action
- Logo and main character Jill from the story trailer
- Developers: Sukeban Games; Wolfgame (Vita)
- Publishers: Ysbryd Games (Vita, Switch, PS4); Wolfgame (Vita); Playism (Japan); Limited Run Games (Vita, PS4, Switch)
- Designer: Christopher Ortiz
- Programmer: Fernando Damas
- Artist: Christopher Ortiz
- Writer: Fernando Damas
- Composer: Michael Kelly
- Engine: GameMaker Studio
- Platforms: Linux; macOS; Windows; PlayStation Vita; Nintendo Switch; PlayStation 4
- Release: June 21, 2016: Windows, macOS, Linux; WW: June 21, 2016; JP: November 16, 2017; PlayStation Vita; NA: November 14, 2017; JP: November 16, 2017; EU: April 20, 2018; Nintendo Switch, PlayStation 4; NA: May 2, 2019; JP: May 30, 2019
- Genres: Simulation, visual novel
- Mode: Single-player

VA-11 Hall-A: Cyberpunk Bartender Action (stylized as VA-11 HALL-A) is a 2016 visual novel developed by Venezuelan studio Sukeban Games and published by Ysbryd Games. The game was initially released for Microsoft Windows, OS X, and Linux on June 21, 2016, and ports were later released for PlayStation Vita, PlayStation 4, and Nintendo Switch, with the Vita port developed by Wolfgame and published by Limited Run Games. The game puts the player in the role of a bartender at the eponymous VA-11 Hall-A, a small bar in a dystopian downtown which attracts interesting customers. Gameplay revolves around making and serving drinks to patrons while listening to their life stories.

VA-11 Hall-A contains nonlinear gameplay, and the game's plotline is influenced by the drinks the player makes and how the customers react to them. There are no dialogue options in the game, and making different drinks is the only way to influence the direction of the story. VA-11 Hall-A features a diverse cast of characters who are average people as opposed to heroes, with developers noting how they were based on the types of side characters that are never fleshed out in movies. Over time, the player begins to know the characters well enough to infer what drinks they want, resulting in an intimate experience.

VA-11 Hall-A was originally developed for the Cyberpunk Game Jam of 2014; however, Sukeban Games liked the concept so much that they eventually turned it into a full game. The original prototype is downloadable for free on the game's official website, and players who pre-ordered gained access to a playable yet separate prologue. The game features a retro-futuristic look based on cyberpunk media, PC-98 games, and anime-inspired visuals, and the writing drew on the developers' own experiences of living in a poorer country. The original planned release date of December 2014 was moved back multiple times due to delays, including when the developers changed the game engine. VA-11 Hall-A garnered pre-release critical acclaim, and post-release reception was mostly favourable, with positive reception directed at its premise, cast of characters, writing, and music. However, some reviewers perceived the game's dialogue as awkward and the gameplay as repetitive. A sequel, N1RV Ann-A, was scheduled for a 2020 release but has since been delayed indefinitely.

== Gameplay ==
=== Premise ===
Interacting with Dorothy, one of the characters in VA-11 HALL-A. Much of the game's gameplay involves creating drinks for characters and listening to their stories, with the quality of the drink influencing the game's storyline. The five drink ingredients which players can mix are shown on the right.

VA-11 Hall-A has been described by its developer, Sukeban Games, as a "cyberpunk bartender action" game, and has been described as a "bartending simulator meets a visual novel somewhere in a cyberpunk dystopia" by TouchArcade. In the game, the player assumes the role of a bartender at "VA-11 Hall-A" (pronounced Valhalla), a small dive bar in a dystopian downtown said to attract interesting clientele. Set in the year 207X, according to the game's official website, VA-11 Hall-A is described as a "a booze em' up about waifus, technology, and post-dystopia life", in a world where "corporations reign supreme, all human life is infected with nanomachines designed to oppress them, and the terrifying White Knights ensure that everyone obeys the laws." Corruption and food shortages "run rampant" in Glitch City, the city where the eponymous bar is located.

At the bar, the player's interaction with the game is focused on preparing drinks based on the given instructions and then serving them to characters. However, the game's experience is primarily storytelling and dialogue-driven, since as the player serves the characters they also listen to their stories and experiences. The game also includes scenes outside the bar, such as at Jill's home where players are able to have text conversations and use apps on her phone. Players can also visit shops and buy items using money they earn while working at the bar to decorate Jill's home, as well as to pay the rent. Keeping Jill happy at home helps her stay more focused at work as well as making her more attuned to cocktail suggestions. Players find out about VA-11 Hall-A's world through the patrons of the bar and a selection of news reports on their in-game tablet computer at the outset of each day. At the start of each work day, the player creates their own music playlist for the game in the bar's jukebox.

=== Bartending ===
There is no time limit for creating drinks. If a player makes a mistake while creating a drink, they can just reset the order and start again; thus, there is no real tension in the gameplay. Making flawless drinks gives the player more money through tips. To create a drink, there are five different ingredients that the player can mix together:

- Adelhyde (a sweet flavour)
- Bronson Extract (a bold taste)
- Powdered Delta (a former rat poison)
- Flanergide (a spicy kick)
- Karmotrine (makes a drink alcoholic)

Although the ingredients are fictional, mixing them together creates nonfictional cocktails as well, such as the Piledriver or Blue Fairy. To add additional variety, patrons at the bar may ask for single, multiple, or one large drink; these drinks can be served either aged or with ice. Players must also pay attention to infer what patrons actually want, which may be different from what they order. For example, a character might be feeling depressed and ask for a sweet drink, though the player instead giving them a shot of alcohol to help them forget their troubles would have a better effect. Alternatively, the player may be able to make a character happy by talking to them instead of letting them feed on their alcoholism. At various points, the player can also tweak the customer's drink, such as adding Karmotrine to a cocktail that was previously non-alcoholic. In these ways, the player creates new scenarios as they advance in the game.

Optional ingredients can be added to the drink, with its usage altering how much the drinker gets drunk. There are no dialogue options in VA-11 Hall-A, with the only interactivity being making clients' requested drinks. Most of the time, clients tell the player exactly what they want, though some can be more cryptic, for example by asking for a certain flavour. As such, VA-11 Hall-A contains nonlinear gameplay in the form of branching storylines, though it is dependent not on traditional choices but rather through the drinks the player prepares. There also exists a recipe book where the recipes to all drinks that can be made can be looked up. Sukeban Games says that they hope the book, which was a requested feature in the game's prologue, would make the bartending "feel more organic", and allow players to experiment.

While the characters drink, they also converse with the player. Depending on how well the player is able to recall drink recipes and create drinks to the clientele's preferences, such conversations change and the overall plotline changes as well. Designer Christopher Ortiz noted that the bartending mechanics in VA-11 Hall-A were made to deliberately "tease the player's mind into doing things out of the box", as opposed to "play[ing] through [it] like a machine, always serving what the patron want[s] and never questioning what they [are] doing." Traditional visual dialogue options which the player could choose were deliberately avoided as they interfered with the subtlety of the game.

=== Characters ===
Much of the details of VA-11 Hall-A's world are not directly told to the player, but instead inferred through interacting with the characters. This is so the world is introduced in a more natural and believably human way, with each character contributing their own perspectives, "providing details that are just random or obscure enough to paint a believable picture." The characters have their own personal story routes in the game. The player character of the game is Jill (formerly named Gillian during development), the bartender at the eponymous VA-11 Hall-A dive bar in Glitch City. Jill is a young female bartender who chose to forego an offer to work at a research institute, instead finding herself to be better suited to the "field of alchemy" in mixing drinks for customers at a dive bar. The game eases the player into its gameplay by letting Jill practice making drinks every morning before she heads to work. The game contains a "colorful cast" of regulars at the bar, including "sex working robots, assassins, private detectives, and pop stars", with how the player serves them having lasting impacts on their lives.

- Alma, described as a "Christmas Cake" by developer Ortiz, is a female hacker who is full of anecdotes about relationships and the consequences of following your dreams at the expense of loved ones.
- Dorothy, an android sex worker. An "odd character", Ortiz described the different reactions players had to her as fun, since some strongly disliked her characterization in the game's prototype while others praised it.
- Ingram McDougal, a grumpy and complaintive man.
- Donovan D. Dawson, the chief editor and director of prominent news site "The Augmented Eye". He is straightforward, quite demanding, and a guy who knows what he wants.
- Streaming-chan, a woman who streams herself 24/7, including her intimate moments.

Other characters in the game include Kim, a neurotic girl who is found passed out outside the bar one evening; Stella, a catgirl; Sei, one of the few pure-hearted and non-corrupt White Knights tasked with protecting Glitch City; *Kira*Miki, an android idol singer; as well as Deal and Betty, an android and veterinarian respectively, who work at a company whose majority of employees are "corgi dogs, fitted with voice boxes." Pete Davison of MoeGamer noted how some characters in the game ridicule or parody real-life themes. For example, the corgis have prejudiced, "even racist" tendencies, with the "disagreements between the different breeds of corgis who work at the company, and seeming resentment between some of the corgis and what they see as other types of dogs trying to take their jobs away from them" mirroring real-life discrimination between humans; Betty, meanwhile, has irrational and illogical resentment of human enhancement. Davison praised these characterizations as laying bare the "sheer ridiculousness of irrational prejudice." There are at least seven different endings in VA-11 Hall-A depending on how well the player gets to know the characters. To obtain these special endings for certain characters, the player must get that character's order right every time throughout the game's story. Eventually, the player gets to know a character well enough that they understand what they wish to drink in an exact moment, which leads to a "very personal experience" between the player and character.

== Development ==
=== History ===
VA-11 Hall-A was developed by indie game developer Sukeban Games, and initially released for the Microsoft Windows, OS X, and Linux platforms on June 21, 2016. A PlayStation Vita port was developed by Wolfgame, and published by Limited Run Games, a publisher specialising in physical versions of digital-only titles. The game was later released for PlayStation 4 and Nintendo Switch. Sukeban is also considering an iPhone version of the game, though that would require a changed interface. The game was designed and drawn by Christopher Ortiz, programmed and written by Fernando Damas, with accompanying music by Michael Kelly; the publisher is Ysbryd Games. VA-11 Hall-A uses the GameMaker: Studio engine as the developers felt it is suitable for the game's "bunch of crazy effects" and is also easy to port to other platforms. Sukeban Games also planned collaborations and crossovers to promote VA-11 Hall-A.

The game's concept stemmed from Ortiz's vision of a game where the player would not assume the role of a traditional hero, but instead play as a bartender who listened to characters tell them stories of life in dystopia. A prologue of VA-11 Hall-A was originally developed for the Cyberpunk Game Jam of 2014; however, Sukeban liked the game so much that they eventually turned it into a full game. Ortiz noted that this was as the developers wanted to see more characters and expand on the stories of the world they built, as well as them looking for a "good challenge design-wise" that engages the player. The developers later retrospectively noted that the prologue also helped to "gauge interest, get some money to fund development, and [serves as] a bonus for pre-ordering all at the same time." This original game jam prototype of VA-11 Hall-A is available to download for free on the game's official website. Additionally, a "redux" version of the prologue was also later redeveloped, serving as a free downloadable content update for the full game; it was released in February 2017. A demo of the game was playable at PAX Prime 2015, as well as at PAX East 2015, when a trailer was also shown. In the demo, the player interacts with "Streaming-chan", a woman who constantly streams her life on the internet. They have limited options; the player can either make her a strong drink and then pry personal information out of her, or mix her a weaker drink to keep her on her guard. The game was also showcased at EGX Rezzed 2016.

The game was first announced in August 2014 with an initial release of December 2014, though it was later delayed multiple times, partially due to the developers changing the game engine partway through development. Players who pre-ordered VA-11 Hall-A gained access to a playable prologue, which is independent of the main game.

The game was initially only offered on desktop platforms, but several console releases followed. A PlayStation Vita port was the first to be announced by Wolfgame at the Game Developers Conference 2015; where another trailer was also shown. The final release date of June 21, 2016 for the Windows, OS X, and Linux versions was confirmed by Sukeban Games in early June 2016, and the final trailer for the game was also released at the same time. The game's Steam and GOG.com pages were launched in mid June, alongside a blog titled The Augmented Eye, a news website set inside VA-11 Hall-A's world to help tease the game and give details on its premise. Sukeban Games had initially expressed interest in porting the game to Nintendo's Wii U and 3DS platforms, but eventually released the game on PlayStation 4 and the Nintendo Switch in May 2019.

=== Design and influences ===
Ortiz said that Sukeban Games was founded when he and Damas started a blog to write about anime and video games. They eventually managed to grow a "small but awesome" community, which led them to create a short dating sim for the blog's first anniversary. After enjoying the video game creation process, they decided to continue following that path. The majority of influences for VA-11 Hall-A come from old PC-98 games, because they are retrofuturistic; especially Redzone's X-Girl: Cyber Punk Adventure which served as the blueprint for the game's aesthetic. According to Ortiz, in the 70s–90s, "the world was under the impression that Japan was going to take over with its superior technology." As such, the game is set in a parallel universe where Japan did conquer the world through technology, leading to the game's strong Japanese influences. Blade Runner, Neuromancer, Ghost in the Shell, and Bubblegum Crisis were also sources of inspiration. Anime influence has also resulted in the game's female protagonist and mostly female character list. Ortiz says that they focus their games on anime fans rather than mainstream appeal, as "the bigger your audience is the more creative troubles you have. Too many opinions and it's hard to see one that will truly help your creative process." VA-11 Hall-A is also partly inspired by Snatcher and Policenauts. The game's music has vaporwave influences, as well as influences from Kenji Kawai's work. Ortiz described VA-11 Hall-A's composer Michael Kelly as a fan of Shin Megami Tensei. The game's developers grew up playing PlayStation and Super Famicom games as well as watching anime; VA-11 Hall-A tries to "make players feel what we felt when playing our favourite titles back then", says Ortiz. Fernando Damas, writer and programmer of VA-11 Hall-A, added in an interview that the game tries to make the player "feel small", and rather than guiding them through the basics of the plotline, the player is instead thrown into the middle of everything and only given the means of piecing together what is going on. He also remarked how the game is set in an actively changing world where things do not wait for the player to happen, with the characters existing long before the player meets them and their lives happen mostly off-screen. As such, the developers hoped to create a world in which the player is compelled, rather than obligated, to understand. Details of the world are not given directly to the player, and instead are revealed through intimate exchanges and conversations with the characters. Thus, according to Ortiz and Damas, VA-11 HALL-A's setting therefore seeks to "humaniz[e] cyberpunk/sci-fi".

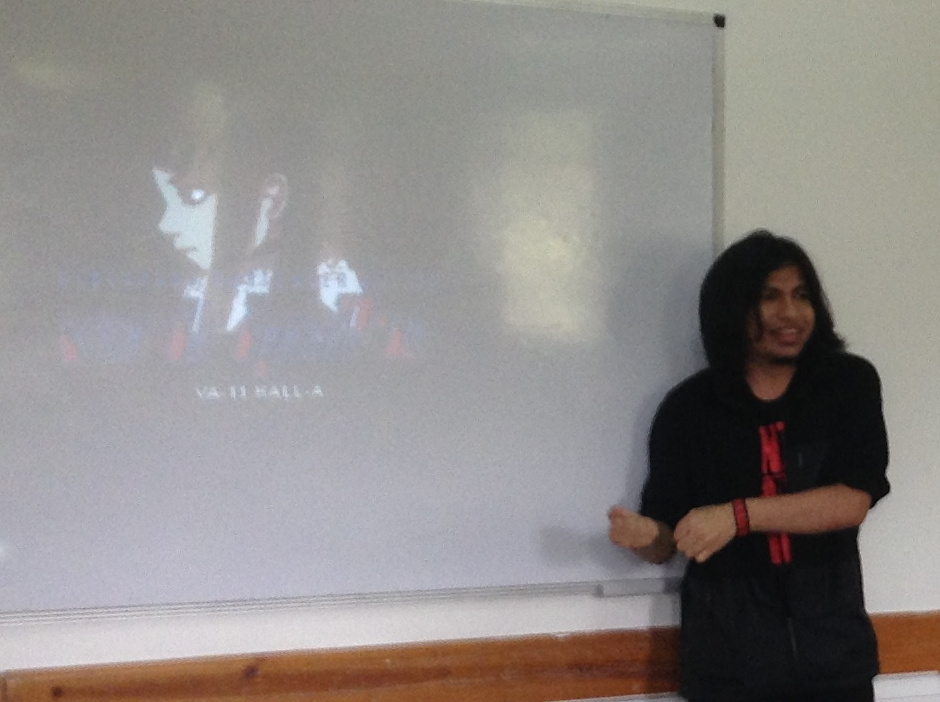
Christopher Ortiz at the Simón Bolívar University, Caracas, in 2018

VA-11 Hall-A's developers come from Venezuela. As such, according to Ortiz, their visions of a dystopian bar scene are based on their own experiences of living in their home country, leading them to create a cast of characters that "try to go on with their lives and be as happy as they can with what they have." Tenacity in the face of difficulty can be found in every character the player interacts with in the game, where despite "each one surviving through varying degrees of hardship, they describe their problems not with bitterness but with an undertone of perseverance" and a certain "burning desire to be happy" notwithstanding their deteriorating surroundings. Damas describes Sukeban Games' titles as "dramedies", or a fusion of drama and comedy, as they feel it is something the game industry lacks and "laughter in the middle of despair" sums up their experiences of living in Venezuela. Ortiz and Damas noted that, compared to these real-life experiences, such as when a friend had to jump from rooftop to rooftop to escape the protests in San Cristóbal, "VA-11 Hall-A is kind of tame in comparison". Two in-game apps, the "danger/u/" textboard and the "Augmented Eye" news site, mirror much of Venezuela's problems into the game's world. Damas explained how they wished to create a more "optimistic kind of dystopia", where the player is just "a normal person living in an interesting future". Additionally, since VA-11 Hall-A is primarily about interaction with characters, the objective of the game is not to save the world but rather to become a part of it.

=== Character development ===
Ortiz wanted to "[tell] stories outside the usual point of view", focusing on types of characters who would usually appear as NPCs in other games. The game's developers made an effort to create and fully explore their characters before placing them into the game. After thinking of a "cool trait or occupation" of the character, a detailed profile was made, "span[ning] from imagining their family life to sleeping habits to what kind of pizza toppings they might prefer." Damas explained that although 70% of these traits are not mentioned in the game, they allow the developers to build up a mental image of the character which helps when writing about them. He elaborated that the developers sought to deliver worldbuilding primarily through character interactions, believing that it "makes finding out about the world more natural." Before adding individual depth, the developers sought to first create a "base", consisting of an easily identifiable trait, for each character to curb redundancy and keep them unique. For example, "Alma started originally as 'Christmas Cake', Stella started as 'Ojou-sama' (a young, upper-class anime stock character), and Betty as 'Grumpy Granola Girl'". "Non-conformity" compared to traditional archetypes was a major factor in how Sukeban Games designed its characters, to be complex and "not defined by one way". Tropes were avoided; for example, Dorothy, an android sex worker, is portrayed with "a unique kind of independence" as opposed to "an edgy character to make things feel more 'mature'", which is the case with most other sex worker characters, according to Ortiz.

TouchArcade noted that VA-11 Hall-A also has a more "salacious side", due to the presence of sexually suggestive character interactions that was present in the game's demo. In an interview between Ortiz and Siliconera, Ortiz said that the game also has "waifu" elements, inspired by the "classic otaku getting strongly attached to a character"; the developers sought to recreate these relationships through characterization and not so much through looks, though there are "a fair share of beautiful people." In another interview with Kill Screen, Ortiz remarked how "this game is all about exploring what's up with the characters that you always see in the background who are never fleshed out [in movies]", and due to this, the characters were designed to be average non-heroes; Jill, for example, was described by Ortiz as the cliche "bartender who's always there in the background" as opposed to a "hero" who is always at "the center of the universe, with everyone else with a supporting role." Adding that "you can see it as early as the premise: [the player is] not a hero, but the bartender", Ortiz further explains that all the game's characters, from the "[science fiction] staples like mercenaries and hackers" to "common folk like veterinarians, journalists, or couriers", were deliberately made to be everyday "people, each with their opinion and lives", making them relatable to the player despite the futuristic setting. To help with this relatability, many of the characters and subplots in VA-11 Hall-A were based on the experiences of the developers themselves or people they know, since "We want the characters to feel as real as possible, and what better reference for real things than reality itself?".

Additionally, through its characters, VA-11 Hall-A challenges traditional viewpoints on affection, relationships, and friendships in video games, writes Ana Valens of Den of Geek. As such, the game's cast "is open, honest, and affectionate towards one another", out of necessity in getting by and surviving in a dystopian world. Ortiz and Damas attempted to infuse political allegories and social commentary into the characters and their stories without overburdening or taking focus away from the main plotline. They noted that, in most video games, "it feels like affection is something that must be earned from scratch or something that must be justified in some way", as well as being "painfully underrated and deemed unnecessary in some cases". To avoid the player feeling this way in VA-11 Hall-A, Sukeban Games made the friendships between Jill and the other characters "[something that's] come to be", instead of something that has to be earned.

== Reception ==
=== Pre-release ===
VA-11 Hall-A received positive pre-release reception. Carter Dotson of TouchArcade found VA-11 Hall-A to be "kind of an odd one" and "certainly something unique", writing that "I'm not completely sure what to make of it, and I'm interested to see how it works out when completed. After all, a game that's story-driven lives and dies on the quality of said story." He compared it to Her Story as something that could "prove to be [...] very cool." This sentiment was echoed by Kyle LeClair of Hardcore Gamer, writing that "VA-11 Hall-A sure looks great and has quite a unique hook to it, so we'll be sure to try and wet our whistles with it when it comes out on the PC". Jess Joho of Kill Screen said that the game "creates a storytelling experience that's grippingly personal" through its conversations and gameplay. Graham Smith of Rock, Paper, Shotgun claimed that although "VA-11 Hall-A, whose punctuation I already resent having to type, is skirting with genres I don't care about: anime-styled visual novels", he found VA-11 Hall-A's branching-style plotline to be more engaging than an average "linear and relatively uninteractive" visual novel. Rock, Paper, Shotgun also chose VA-11 Hall-A to be one of the best games shown at EGX Rezzed 2016.

Zack Reese of RPG Site had a "great time" with the game's prologue, critiquing that "there were a lot of great touches to be had here, whether it's the anime-inspired character portraits, the fitting soundtrack that is nice to listen to even outside of context, or simply getting a permanent look of the cityscape", though he was "especially fascinated" by the "very intriguing cast of characters." Steven Hansen of Destructoid, in writing about VA-11 Hall-A, observed that "games don't always need to be bombastic save-the-world-'em-ups", and also the game "should be the best anime-inspired bartending sim of the year. And I don't say that lightly." He also added that he was "sold" and compared the game to Catherine. Salvador GRodiles of Japanator joked that he looked forward to the "glorious date" and "special joyous day" that is VA-11 Hall-A's release date.

PC Gamer's Phil Savage praised the game's character interactions, noting that "it's through these brief, unguarded conversations that the cyberpunk bartending sim slowly unfolds its story; not of a dystopian world, but of the people living in it." Reviewing the game's prologue trailer, he added that "it's an interesting concept, and well executed in what is—at this stage—a somewhat limited capacity." Julian Benson of Kotaku wrote that "Valhalla is a cocktail of game genres. It draws from visual novels, with each customer who visits your bar having a different story to tell. There's a healthy measure of Papers, Please, too, with you having to perform a mundane job (drink mixing) by following a complicated list of tasks. [...] And, on top of that you also get to manage and decorate your bar, so there's a dash of Animal Crossing for flavour." He also quipped that "year after year, nothing seems to slow the pace of successful cyberpunk bartender simulators." Push Square's Nicola Hayden added that "gaining cult success around the more niche areas of the Internet, VA-11 Hall-A, a cyberpunk bartending simulator, has managed to stir up quite a fuss." Pete Davison of MoeGamer praised the prologue's characters, dialogue, as well as cohesion between the gameplay and storytelling, finding it to be an "enormously interesting prospect".

=== Post-release ===
Reception

Aggregate score
Aggregator	Score
Metacritic	PC: 77/100; PS4: 83/100; VITA: 82/100; NS: 83/100

Review scores
Publication	Score
Destructoid	9/10
Game Informer	8/10
GameRevolution	4.5/5
Hardcore Gamer	3/5
HobbyConsolas	80/100
Nintendo Life	7/10
Nintendo World Report	8.5/10
PC Gamer (US)	60/100
Push Square	8/10
Shacknews	80/100
Kill Screen	80/100

Katherine Cross of Gamasutra, while not giving a final score, praised Jill's character as not being a traditional protagonist or "in control of much" in her world, the setting, as well as the "delightfully colorful" cast; and that VA-11 Hall-A successfully "make[s] magic out of the mundane." She also explored the sexual aspects of the game, which she commended as realistic. Mike Cosimano of Destructoid awarded VA-11 Hall-A a score of 9/10, referring to it as a "hallmark of excellence" and complimenting the game's design, characters, as well as the "connection" felt between the player and the protagonist. Cecilia D'Anastasio of Kotaku echoed this sentiment, finding VA-11 Hall-A to be "wildly impressive" and a "brilliant experiment in storytelling", which is "a must-buy for fans of interactive fiction, stylized retro games, cyberpunk and girls with cat ears – just about everybody, right?" David Roberts of GamesRadar wrote that "the writing [in VA-11 Hall-A] is genuinely stellar"; he also praised the cast of "colourful characters" and the game's replayability. Roberts summarized it as a game "you should be playing."

Sin Vega of Rock, Paper, Shotgun received VA-11 Hall-A generally positively. He found the writing to be "decent" and the characters "generally enjoyable, even when they're not exactly likeable", and praised the game's references to current pop-culture issues and internet climate, for example 4chan, human augmentation and manufactured pop stars. The music and gameplay were also complimented, but the game's presentation was criticised – especially the presentation of the dialogue, which only takes up a few lines per page. Caty McCarthy of Kill Screen wrote that VA-11 Hall-A "flips the atypical ways of cyberpunk", and lauded the game's story, which "has heart" as a "story of its people, its liliths, its sentient preserved-brains, its talking dogs. It's the story of Jill and her customers, all being lost, and eventually finding their way." She compared it also to a good book, where "we, the player, take[s] the backseat, and soak[s] it all in." A final score of 80/100 was awarded. Zack Kotzer, writing for Motherboard, compared VA-11 Hall-A to "Ghost in the Shell meets Cheers", and added that what makes the game engaging is that it chooses to focus on "one very specific corner" of a complex world, writing "sure, there's an urban war brewing outside, but inside this [bar] is just people. Chatter about current events and politics, morality, and sex."

However, PC Gamer's review was more mixed, opining that although "what Valhalla is trying to do is interesting", "playing it is boring", with criticism directed at the repetitive nature of gameplay as well as the game's tone, which leaves a "strange, unpleasant lingering taste in your mouth" due to the oftentimes unrealistic dialogue, for a rating of 60/100. Much of these sentiments were echoed by Kate Gray of Eurogamer; she also praised the premise as interesting, but lamented that "Valhalla's bartending is just boring", with not enough player control to make the game feel creative. Adi Robertson of The Verge alleged that some reviewers found the game's sexualized dialogue from the female characters to be unrealistic. Ortiz responded that interactions were based upon their own interactions, including that "females have always been more open about those topics than males", but he did concede that "we wrote ourselves into a corner by making the cast predominantly female".

=== Accolades ===
VA-11 Hall-A made appearances on lists of the most anticipated video games multiple times before its release. An article by GamesRadar staff of the "12 PAX East games we wish we were still playing" included VA-11 Hall-A; praise was directed at the game's complexity, and how "you can decide to give the customer the drink they ordered, flipping through the recipe book and dragging ingredients into the mixer in a simple minigame, or you can screw it up, and give them something totally different", as well as the "wildly different directions" the narrative takes as a result. Similarly, Twinfinite's Matthew Byrd ranked VA-11 Hall-A first on the "10 Anticipated Indie Games You Have to Check Out in 2016", writing that: "While I can honestly say that I've never specifically wished for a cyberpunk bartending game before, now that I know such a thing exists, it is all that I can think of." Zach Budgor of Kill Screen described VA-11 Hall-A as one of their favourite titles at Cyberpunk Game Jam 2014, describing it as "self-styled 'cyberpunk bartender action' with detailed art and an LP's worth of bass-heavy future bangers." PC Gamer added VA-11 Hall-A's playable prologue to their list of "The best free PC games". Upon release, Thomas Faust of IndieGames.com labelled VA-11 Hall-A the best game of the year, adding "as far as I'm concerned, the rest of 2016 can go home now. Game of the year right there, bam." Faust also noted that the slice of life setting of VA-11 Hall-A, as well as its characters, are a departure from more conventional video game settings. Similarly, Gizmodo UK on June 25 listed VA-11 Hall-A as their top recommended video game for the week. Ana Valens of Den of Geek also listed VA-11 Hall-A as "one of the great visual novels of 2016", again praising the game's characters and "powerful" writing.

== Legacy ==
A short spin-off visual novel, VA-11 Hall-A KIDS!, was released on April 1, 2018, as an April Fools' Day joke. A parody set in a Japanese high school, it features younger versions of the game's characters. It also included an Easter egg for a future 3D game with PS1-era graphics.

The sequel N1RV Ann-A was announced in September 2018 for PlayStation 4, Nintendo Switch, and PC. It takes place on Saint Alicia, a fictional resort island in the Caribbean, and follows Sam, a working mother with an 8-year-old son who is having relationship issues with her partner Leon. It was planned for release in 2020, but was delayed in December 2020 to a non-specific date due to programming-related delays and creative differences.

== See also ==
- Coffee Talk, a similarly structured game featuring a barista
- Saeko: Giantess Dating Sim, a game whose development was influenced by VA-11 Hall-A
