= Shadow Fight =

- Genre: Fighting
- Developer: Nekki
- Publisher: Nekki
- Platforms: Android, Facebook, iOS, Microsoft Windows, Nintendo Switch
- First release: Shadow Fight; February 12, 2011
- Latest release: Shades: Shadow Fight Roguelike; November 6, 2023

Shadow Fight is a series of fighting video games developed by Banzai.Games and published by Nekki. Each game is set in the Far East, involving martial arts action between combatants that are typically silhouettes. The first installment was initially released as a Facebook game before two sequels were made available as free-to-play mobile games.

== Games ==
=== Shadow Fight ===
Shadow Fight
- Developer: Nekki
- Publisher: Nekki
- Platform: Facebook
- Release: WW: February 12, 2011
- Genre: Fighting
- Mode: Single-player

Shadow Fight was a Facebook-based fighting game developed by Nekki. It was released on February 12, 2011. In online battles, players play against each other, utilizing magic spells, long-range weapons, and hand-to-hand combat tools, or through unarmed fighting. Shadow Fight was available in English, Russian, German, French, Italian, Portuguese, and Turkish on Facebook.

The game was available until a few months before the release of Shadow Fight 3. On August 16, 2017, the developers announced on Twitter that the Shadow Fight servers would shut down on September 29, 2017, and that in-game transactions would no longer be accepted. Players who opened the game received 900,000 rubies as a farewell gift. Due to popular demand, however, Nekki delayed the shutdown by one month to October 27, 2017.

=== Shadow Fight 2 ===
Shadow Fight 2 is a popular fighting game developed by Nekki. It was the second installment of the trilogy. Released worldwide in 2014 for mobile devices and ported to computers and eighth-generation consoles, the sequel is more story-driven than its predecessor. The plot follows a warrior known only as "Shadow", who was once a legendary warrior, renowned for never losing a battle. While seeking a worthy opponent, Shadow accidentally opened the Gate of Shadows, a pathway to another realm, unleashing powerful demons into his world. Reduced to a faceless silhouette, Shadow now fights to reclaim his lost honor and physical body.

The game consists of multiple acts, each involving the player leveling up by taking part in battles against AI-controlled opponents, earning currency to upgrade Shadow's arsenal. While the first acts revolve around Shadow battling the demons he unleashed upon the world and looking for a way to seal back the Gates of Shadows, the final part of the game sees Shadow venturing into the Shadow World, where he must defeat an alien warlord called "Titan". The game also includes a multiplayer mode, where rather than fighting each other, players must work together to defeat various bosses in the Underworld.

=== Shadow Fight 3 ===
Shadow Fight 3
- Developer: Banzai.Games
- Publisher: Nekki
- Platforms: iOS; Android
- Release: CAN: July 17, 2017; IND: October 27, 2017; WW: November 16, 2017
- Genre: Fighting
- Mode: Single-player

Shadow Fight 3 is a fighting game with action role-playing elements. It was announced in April 2017 with an expected release in the fall of the same year.

Unlike its predecessors, Shadow Fight 3 does not represent fighters as silhouettes. Instead, they are rendered as lifelike three-dimensional characters in an animated environment. Players build up a gauge during combat, which allows them to temporarily enter 'Shadow Form'. Shadow abilities are based on the player's current gear and faction. Items are acquired in the form of collectible cards that can be earned or purchased.

=== Shadow Fight 4: Arena ===
Shadow Fight 4: Arena
- Developer: Banzai.Games
- Publisher: Nekki
- Platforms: iOS; Android
- Release: November 3, 2020
- Genre: Fighting
- Modes: Single-player; PvP

Shadow Fight 4: Arena was released in November 2020.

=== Shades: Shadow Fight Roguelike ===
Shades: Shadow Fight Roguelike is a sequel to Shadow Fight 2.
