= 1983 in science fiction =

The year 1983 was marked, in science fiction, by the following:

== Events ==
- The 41st annual Worldcon, ConStellation, was held in Baltimore , USA

== Births and deaths ==
=== Deaths ===
- Roy G. Krenkel
- Mack Reynolds

== Literary releases ==
=== Novels ===
- Helliconia Summer, by Brian Aldiss
- Millennium, by John Varley
- Startide Rising, by David Brin

=== Short stories ===
- "Cyberpunk", by Bruce Bethke

=== Comics ===
- American Flagg! #1, by Howard Chaykin
- Fist of the North Star, by Buronson and Tetsuo Hara, begins serialization in Weekly Shonen Jump magazine
- Ronin, by Frank Miller

== Movies ==
- The Dead Zone, dir. by David Cronenberg
- Star Wars Episode VI— Return of the Jedi, dir. by Richard Marquand
- Videodrome, dir. by David Cronenberg

== Television ==
- V (miniseries)

== Video games ==
- M.U.L.E.
- Planetfall
- Space Ace

== Awards ==
=== Hugos ===
- Best novel: Foundation's Edge, by Isaac Asimov
- Best novella: Hardfought, by Greg Bear
- Best novelette: "Fire Watch", by Connie Willis
- Best short story: "Melancholy Elephants", by Spider Robinson
- Best related work: Isaac Asimov: The Foundations of Science Fiction, by James E. Gunn
- Best dramatic presentation: Blade Runner, dir. by Ridley Scott; screenplay by Hampton Fancher and David Peoples; based on the novel Do Androids Dream of Electric Sheep? by Philip K. Dick
- Best professional editor: Edward L. Ferman
- Best professional artist: Michael Whelan
- Best fanzine: Locus, ed. by Charles N. Brown
- Best fan writer: Richard E. Geis
- Best fan artist: Alexis Gilliland

=== Nebulas ===
- Best novel: Startide Rising, by David Brin
- Best novella: Hardfought, by Greg Bear
- Best novelette: "Blood Music", by Greg Bear
- Best short story: "The Peacemaker", by Gardner Dozois

=== Other awards ===
- BSFA Award for Best Novel: Tik-Tok, by John Sladek
- Locus Award for Best Science Fiction Novel: Foundation's Edge, by Isaac Asimov
- Saturn Award for Best Science Fiction Film: Star Wars Episode VI— Return of the Jedi, dir. by Richard Marquand
