= Metaltech (band) =

Scottish band

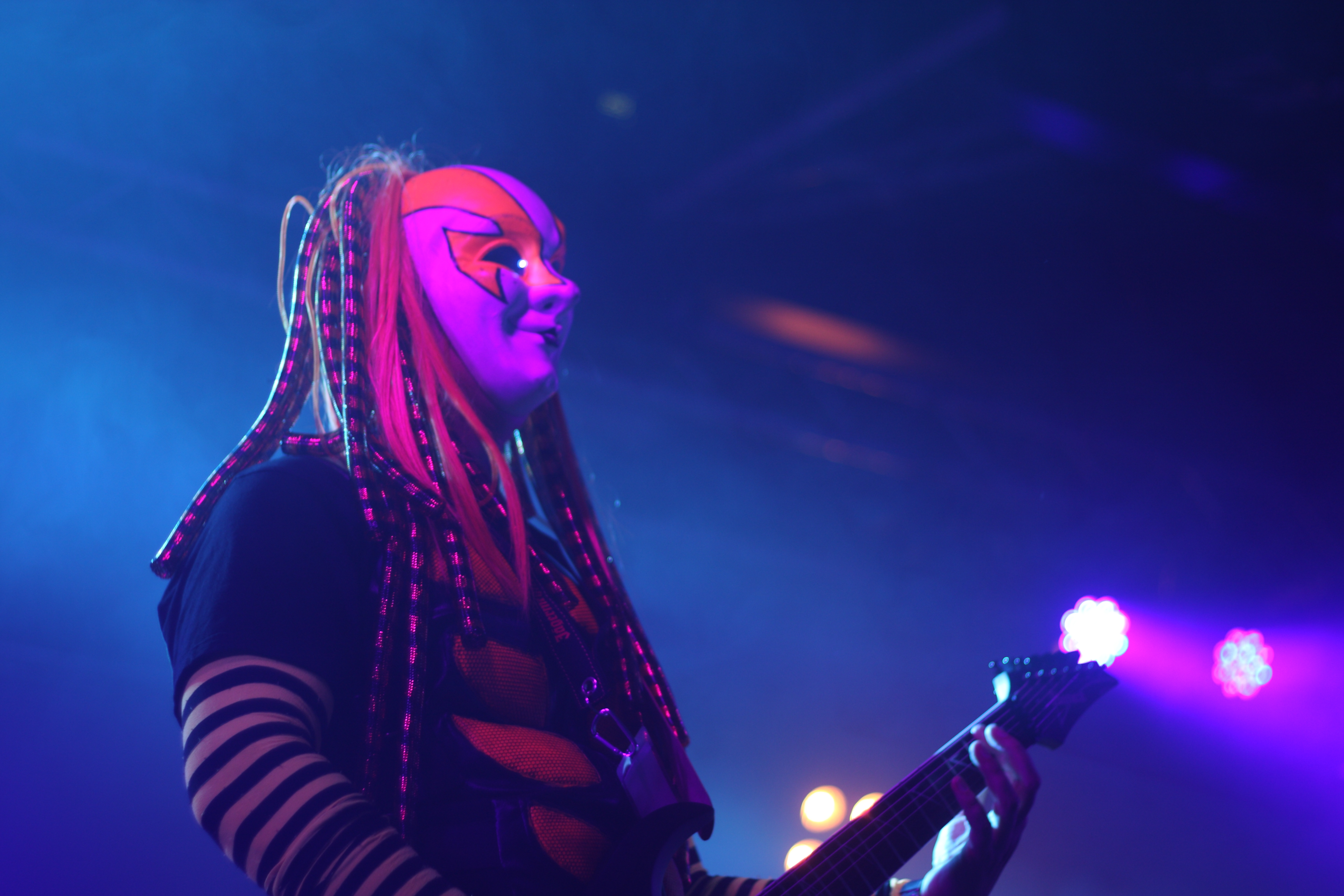
- Metaltech at Infest 2013

Background information
- Origin: Edinburgh, Scotland
- Genres: Industrial; techno; industrial metal
- Years active: 2008–present
- Label: Alex Tronic Records
- Members: Erik Tricity; The Insidious Doktor Mayhem; Lord Thrapston Flagellator
- Website: www.metaltech.me

Metaltech are a three piece Scottish industrial metal band from Edinburgh. They consist of Erik Tricity (Erik Grieve) performing vocals, rhythm guitar, programming and production, Lord Thrapston Flagellator (flə-JELL-A-tər) (Emmett Christie) playing bass guitar and the Insidious Doktor Mayhem (Rory Alsop) providing lead guitar and pyrotechnics.

Their music is an amalgamation of rock/metal guitars, funk/slap bass, synthesizers, techno inspired programmed drums and tongue-in-cheek lyrics.

Metaltech are renowned for their theatrical performances and over the top behaviour, with band members donning masks, Kabuki style make up and eccentric costumes, all themed in neon orange, black and white. Their stage show involves frequent audience interaction with items such as glo-sticks and party poppers being thrown into the crowd, as well as the use of bubble guns, confetti cannons and fireworks.

== History: Band formation ==
Metaltech formed in January 2009 and played their first gig at the Ark in Edinburgh on 1 February 2009. After a few small gigs, the band was then offered a support slot with Alec Empire of Atari Teenage Riot that resulted in increased recognition. After using their strong image to stand out in a nationwide television advertising campaign for T-Mobile, they landed gigs at Rockness, The Wickerman Festival and Belladrum, three Scottish music festivals.

In 2011, they came second in the running in the Best Metal category at the Scottish Alternative Music Awards, and were nominated and played live at the Scottish New Music Awards. Having released two EPs and working around Scotland including a mini tour with Japanese band Psydoll, the band went on to perform in London at the fetish venue, Club Antichrist. This performance introduced additional performers in the shape of the Kamikaze Girls, who, dressed as latex sex dolls pole danced during the song Sex on the Dancefloor. Metaltech then provided support for Angelspit at The Classic Grand in Glasgow. Later supporting KMFDM, Metaltech were also the opening act at the Infest (festival) in 2013. The beginning of 2014 saw the band tour Scotland with Psydoll for a second time.

== Recordings ==
Metaltech released their first EP, Alkomatic, on 10 July 2010 on Alex Tronic Records. Their second Alex Tronic Records EP, Sex on the Dancefloor, was released on 3 September 2010 and featured remixes by other artists on the Alex Tronic label (Erik Tricity Electro Sex Mix, Vout Congo Helium Mix, Alex Tronic Tantric Trance Mix, and Neu Gestalt Mix).

In August 2010, Bannerman's Bar in Edinburgh released volume 6 of their Under the Bridge compilation album series. Track 6 is Metaltech's "This Kiss"

In September 2011, United Noise Records released Remix Theory digital download 11 track album, with Metaltech's Burn Your Fucking Planet remixed by K-Nitrate (as the K-Nitrate Kyohen Network Remix), and by System:FX as the Ignite Mix)

On 15 August 2011, Metaltech released the album, Burn Your Planet, also on Alex Tronic Records. The Skinny said Metaltech had; "an obvious knack for knocking out extremely danceable industrial, the kind of music that you couldn't stop your head rhythmically swaying to, even if you wanted, and then filling the gaps with abundant 80's style guitar lines: simple, uncomplicated, melodic".

Brutal Resonance said; "can the masked trio make a studio product that captures the same energy, showmanship and white-hot skill they put into every gig they play? The answer is an undeniable 'yes'. From the opening of the first track to the last Metaltech indelibly stamp themselves into your brain".

== Discography ==
=== Alkomatic EP (2010) ===
Alkomatic

Studio album by Metaltech
- Released: 1 June 2010
- Genres: Techno, Metal, Rock, Industrial
- Length: 15:14
- Label: Alex Tronic Records
- Producer: Erik Tricity

Alkomatic EP is the debut EP from Scottish metal band Metaltech, released in 2010. The album cover's artwork was provided by Erik Tricity.

==== Track listing ====
No.	Title	Length
1.	"Sell Your Soul"	2:49
2.	"Kontrol"	3:51
3.	"Wasted"	4:06
4.	"Burn Your Fucking Planet"	4:28

=== Sex on the Dancefloor EP (2010) ===
Sex on the Dancefloor EP

Studio album by Metaltech
- Released: 3 September 2010
- Genres: Techno, Metal, Rock, Industrial
- Length: 22:24
- Label: Alex Tronic Records
- Producer: Erik Tricity

Sex on the Dancefloor EP is Metaltech's second EP, featuring four remixes of the title track. The album cover's artwork was provided by Erik Tricity.

==== Track listing ====
No.	Title	Length
1.	"Sex on the Dancefloor (Erik Tricity Electro Sex Mix)"	5:33
2.	"Sex on the Dancefloor (Vout Congo Helium Mix)"	6:39
3.	"Sex on the Dancefloor (Alex Tronic Tantric Dance Mix)"	4:40
4.	"Sex on the Dancefloor (Neu Gestalt Mix)"	5:32

=== Burn Your Planet (2011) ===
Burn Your Planet

Studio album by Metaltech and Bob MacGregor
- Released: 2 September 2011
- Genres: Techno, Metal, Rock, Industrial
- Length: 40:40
- Label: Alex Tronic Records
- Producer: Erik Tricity

Burn Your Planet is Metaltech's first full-length album, released in 2011 and mastered at Finiflex Studio in Edinburgh.

==== Track listing ====
No.	Title	Length
1.	"Elektrik"	2:30
2.	"Kontrol"	3:49
3.	"This Kiss"	5:41
4.	"Kommitment"	6:05
5.	"Slice"	4:35
6.	"Slam Trance"	5:23
7.	"Dreams"	3:52
8.	"Sex on the Dancefloor"	5:31
9.	"Burn Your Fucking Planet"	3:14

== Awards ==
In 2011 Metaltech were nominated in the Group of the Year category in The Scottish New Music Awards, and in the Heavy Metal category in The Scottish Alternative Music Awards.

== Radio play ==
Metaltech visited Leith FM (Now Castle FM) in Edinburgh on 2 December 2009 to be interviewed by Laura Kerr, and to play a few tracks.

Dark Essence Radio in Australia played Metaltech's "Slice" on 25 March 2013 between Rammstein's Ich Will, and SITD's Beacon of Hope.

Radio Russelsheim in Germany played Metaltech on 22 August 2013 during their IG Metal and Rock evening show.

== Tours, festivals and concerts ==
One of Metaltech's early live performances was supporting Alec Empire from Atari Teenage Riot in 2009. They are regular performers on the British music festival scene, and have performed at events such as Rockness, The Wickerman Festival, Belladrum, Alba Industrial and Infest 2013. They have also performed at the London fetish venue Club Antichrist, supporting Global Citizen, and at legendary Glasgow venue King Tut's Wah Wah Hut supporting Marionette. They have made multiple appearances at The Classic Grand in Glasgow, supporting acts such as KMFDM, Angelspit, Dope Stars Inc., Surgyn and Analog Angel, and have unleashed their party style stage show supporting Hanzel Und Gretyl at Bannerman's Bar in Edinburgh.

In February 2014, they were the support act for Japanese Cyberpunks Psydoll. Throughout this tour they were shadowed by American photographer and film maker Allan Amato, who recorded the band as part of an upcoming feature about their journey through the music world.

On 30 August 2014, Metaltech had their first outing to Nottingham, playing at The Maze with System:FX and Tapewyrm.

On 9 September 2014, Metaltech headlined the inaugural Orkney Rock Festival, in Kirkwall, Orkney. The Orcadian – a local newspaper interviewed Alsop and Tricity for a very positive news article.

February 2015 saw them play at The Moorings in Aberdeen once again, followed by a slot supporting fellow Scottish industrial/EDM/rock band Je$us Loves Amerika's Falling Down EP launch and then a high-profile opening support slot for American stoner rock band Monster Magnet at the Garage in Glasgow, with Robert MacGregor (guitarist with Electric Mother) as a guest.

=== Acoustech ===
Metaltech has an acoustic alter-ego, Acoustech, comprising Erik Tyledisfunction, Laird Tarpaulin Combineharvester and Rory Spachemen. This band plays acoustic instruments, Erik on 6-string, Rory on 6 and 12 string guitars, and Laird on a custom fretless acoustic bass made by luthier Chris Larkin, and their songs are folk and country rearrangements of Metaltech's amplified songs. They first played on 10 February 2011, headlining an Edinburgh Unplugged folk night at Edinburgh's renowned Royal Oak pub, and an online rivalry has continued ever since.

== Band members ==
Permanent

- Erik Tricity (Erik Grieve) – programming, keyboards, rhythm guitar
- The Insidious Doktor Mayhem (Rory Alsop) – lead guitar
- Lord Thrapston Flagellator (Emmett Christie) – bass guitar

Others

- Snow King (Classical timpanist and creator of Industrial project Plastic Noose) has also played guest bass for Metaltech twice in place of Christie at live gigs.
- Bob MacGregor – writing credit and guitars on Slam Trance and Dreams on the Burn Your Planet album. Guest second guitar slot for 14 February 2015 supporting Monster Magnet
