= Michael Wall (playwright) =

English playwright (1946–1991)

Michael Wall (22 November 1946 – 11 June 1991) was a British playwright. He wrote over forty plays, the most well-known of which are Amongst Barbarians and Women Laughing.

Born in Hereford, England, he read English at the University of York, graduating in 1976. He wrote several stage plays, but the majority of his work was done for radio. Several of his works were produced by the BBC.

Amongst Barbarians, for which he won the 1989 Mobil Competition's prize for playwriting, was first produced at the Royal Exchange Theatre in Manchester, England. It then moved to the Hampstead Theatre in London, and was later made into a British made-for-television movie.

He won the Sony and Giles Cooper Awards in 1985 for Hiroshima – The Movie, which he wrote for BBC radio.

Women Laughing, written in 1989, was produced on stage at the Royal Court Theatre in 1992, just after the author's death.

Headcrash was produced for the BBC in 1986. However, due to concerns about its violent content, it was not broadcast until 1993, two years after the author's death.

== Bibliography (incomplete) ==
- Japanese Style (1982)
- Goodnight Mr. Zero (1982)
- A Marriage of Convenience (1983)
- Sound Explosion (1984)
- Blue Days (1985)
- Hiroshima – The Movie (1985)
- Headcrash (1986)
- The Wide-Brimmed Hat (1987)
- Act of Mercy (1988)
- The Last of the Lovers (1989)
- Women Laughing (1989)
- Amongst Barbarians (1989)

== Awards (incomplete) ==
- Mobil Playwriting Competition award for Amongst Barbarians
- The Sony Award for Hiroshima – The Movie
- Giles Cooper Award for Hiroshima – The Movie

== Selected press quotes ==
- "'I'm gonna shoot roller-skaters, you coming?’ must be one of the best lines of offhand dialogue ever. It encapsulates the grimly humorous, nihilistic ambience of Michael Wall's futuristic Headcrash..." The Independent, 27 July 1993
- "Michael Wall's death has come too suddenly and too soon. Following his success with AMONGST BARBARIANS…it seemed that he would finally be able to realise his potential as a major playwright for the stage." The Independent, 14 June 1991
- "Amongst Barbarians…typified his challenge to the indifference and cruelty associated with Britain's colonial legacy. While he was horrified by the ignorance and arrogance of the smugglers' families, he understood the alienation that had formed their attitudes." The Guardian, 17 June 1991
- Of Amongst Barbarians, "...an impressively mature work, worthy winner of the second Mobil Playwriting Competition...scorchingly well acted production...A gripping evening." The Times 1989

== Sources ==
- The Independent 27 July 1993
- The Independent 14 June 1991
- The Guardian 17 June 1991
- Financial Times 1996
