= Cyberpunk =

Science fiction subgenre in a futuristic dystopian setting

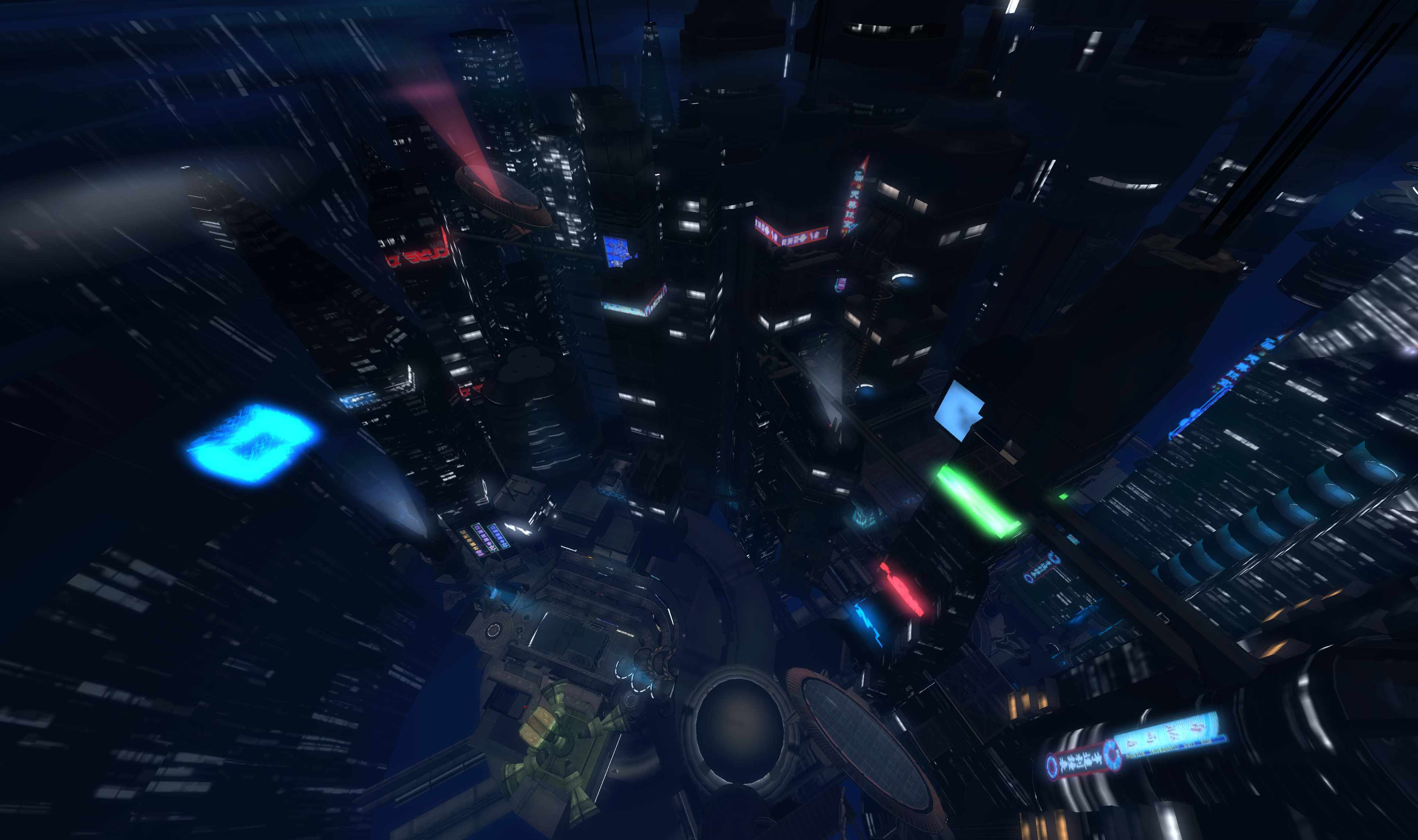
- A screenshot of InSilico, a cyberpunk city hub from Second Life
- Features: Artificial intelligence, cyberware, megacorporations
- Authors: William Gibson; Philip K. Dick
- Publications: Neuromancer; Do Androids Dream of Electric Sheep?; Akira
- Series: Judge Dredd; Tron

Subgenres
- Biopunk; Solarpunk

Related genres
- Science fiction, Steampunk

Cyberpunk is a subgenre of science fiction set in a dystopian future. It is characterized by its focus on a combination of "lowlife and high tech". It features a range of futuristic technological and scientific achievements, including artificial intelligence and cyberware, which are juxtaposed with societal collapse, dystopia or decay. Much of cyberpunk comes from the New Wave science fiction movement of the 1960s and '70s. Writers such as Philip K. Dick, Michael Moorcock, Roger Zelazny, John Brunner, J. G. Ballard, Philip José Farmer, and Harlan Ellison explored the impact of technology, drug culture, and the sexual revolution. These authors diverged from the utopian tendencies of earlier science fiction.

Comics exploring cyberpunk themes began appearing as early as Judge Dredd, first published in 1977 in the British comics anthology 2000 AD. Released in 1984, William Gibson's influential debut novel Neuromancer helped solidify cyberpunk as a genre, drawing influence from punk subculture and early hacker culture. Frank Miller's Ronin is an example of a cyberpunk graphic novel. Other influential cyberpunk writers include Bruce Sterling and Rudy Rucker. The Japanese cyberpunk subgenre began in 1982 with the debut of Katsuhiro Otomo's manga series Akira, with its 1988 anime film adaptation (also directed by Otomo) popularizing the subgenre.

Early films in the genre include Ridley Scott's 1982 film Blade Runner, one of several film adaptations of Philip K. Dick's books (in this case, Do Androids Dream of Electric Sheep?). RoboCop (1987), Total Recall (1990), Judge Dredd (1995), and The Matrix trilogy (1999–2003) were also successful cyberpunk films. The 1987 show Max Headroom is considered the first cyberpunk TV series, taking place in a futuristic dystopia ruled by an oligarchy of television networks, with computer hacking playing a central role in many storylines.

Newer cyberpunk media includes Tron: Ares (2025) and Tron: Legacy (2010), sequels to the original Tron (1982); Blade Runner 2049 (2017), a sequel to the 1982 film; Dredd (2012), which was not a sequel to the original movie; Ghost in the Shell (2017), a live-action adaptation of the original manga; Alita: Battle Angel (2019), based on the 1990s Japanese manga Battle Angel Alita; the 2018 Netflix TV series Altered Carbon, based on Richard K. Morgan's 2002 novel of the same name; and the video game Cyberpunk 2077 (2020) and original net animation (ONA) anime miniseries Cyberpunk: Edgerunners (2022), both based on R. Talsorian Games's 1988 tabletop role-playing game Cyberpunk.

== Overview ==
Cyberpunk plots often involve conflict between artificial intelligence, hackers, and megacorporations, and tend to be set in a near-future Earth, rather than in far-future settings or galactic vistas. The settings are usually post-industrial dystopias but tend to feature extraordinary cultural ferment and the use of technology in ways never anticipated by its original inventors ("the street finds its own uses for things"). Much of the genre's atmosphere echoes film noir, and written works in the genre often use techniques from detective fiction. Over time, cyberpunk has shifted from a literary movement to a subgenre of science fiction.

Writer Lawrence Person has attempted to define the content and ethos of the cyberpunk literary movement, saying:

Classic cyberpunk characters were marginalized, alienated loners who lived on the edge of society in generally dystopic futures where daily life was impacted by rapid technological change, an ubiquitous datasphere of computerized information, and invasive modification of the human body.

== Etymology ==
The term "cyberpunk" first appeared as the title of a short story by Bruce Bethke, written in 1980 and published in Amazing Stories in 1983. The name was picked up by Gardner Dozois, editor of Isaac Asimov's Science Fiction Magazine, and popularized in his editorials.

Bethke says he made two lists of words, one for technology, one for troublemakers, and experimented with combining them variously into compound words, consciously attempting to coin a term that encompassed both punk attitudes and high technology. He described the idea thus:

The kids who trashed my computer; their kids were going to be Holy Terrors, combining the ethical vacuity of teenagers with a technical fluency we adults could only guess at. Further, the parents and other adult authority figures of the early 21st Century were going to be terribly ill-equipped to deal with the first generation of teenagers who grew up truly "speaking computer".

Afterward, Dozois began using this term in his own writing, most notably in a 1984 Washington Post article where he said: "About the closest thing here to a self-willed esthetic 'school' would be the purveyors of bizarre hard-edged, high-tech stuff, who have on occasion been referred to as 'cyberpunks' — Sterling, Gibson, Shiner, Cadigan, Bear."

== History and origins ==
The origins of cyberpunk are rooted in the New Wave science fiction movement of the 1960s and 1970s, where New Worlds, under the editorship of Michael Moorcock, began inviting and encouraging stories that examined new writing styles, techniques, and archetypes. Reacting to conventional storytelling, New Wave authors attempted to present a world where society coped with a constant upheaval of new technology and culture, generally with dystopian outcomes. Writers like Roger Zelazny, J. G. Ballard, Philip José Farmer, Samuel R. Delany, and Harlan Ellison often examined the impact of drug culture, technology, and the ongoing sexual revolution, drawing themes and influence from experimental literature of Beat Generation authors such as William S. Burroughs, and art movements like Dadaism.

Ballard, a notable critic of literary archetypes in science fiction, instead employs metaphysical and psychological concepts, seeking greater relevance to readers of the day. Ballard's work is considered to have had a profound influence on cyberpunk's development, as evidenced by the term "Ballardian" becoming used to ascribe literary excellence amongst science fiction social circles. Ballard, along with Zelazny and others continued the popular development of "realism" within the genre.

Delany's 1968 novel Nova, considered a forerunner of cyberpunk literature, includes neural implants, a now popular cyberpunk trope for human-computer interfaces. Philip K. Dick's novel Do Androids Dream of Electric Sheep?, first published in 1968, shares common dystopian themes with later works by Gibson and Sterling; it is praised for its "realist" exploration of cybernetic and artificial intelligence ideas and ethics.

In 1984, William Gibson's novel Neuromancer was published, delivering a glimpse of a future encompassed by what became an archetype of cyberpunk "virtual reality", with the human mind being fed light-based worldscapes through a computer interface. Some, perhaps ironically including Bethke, the originator of the term "cyberpunk", argued at the time that the writers whose style Gibson's books epitomized should be called "Neuromantics", a pun on the name of the novel plus "New Romantics", a term used for a New Wave pop music movement that had just occurred in Britain. Bethke later paraphrased Michael Swanwick's argument for the term: "the movement writers should properly be termed neuromantics, since so much of what they were doing was clearly imitating Neuromancer".

Sterling was another writer who played a central role, often consciously, in the cyberpunk genre, variously seen as either keeping it on track, or distorting its natural path into a stagnant formula. In 1986, he edited a volume of cyberpunk stories called Mirrorshades: The Cyberpunk Anthology, an attempt to establish what cyberpunk was, from Sterling's perspective.

In the subsequent decade, the motifs of Gibson's Neuromancer became formulaic, climaxing in the satirical extremes of Neal Stephenson's Snow Crash in 1992.

Bookending the cyberpunk era, Bethke himself published a novel in 1995 called Headcrash, like Snow Crash a satirical attack on the genre's excesses. Fittingly, it won an honor named after cyberpunk's spiritual founder, the Philip K. Dick Award. It satirized the genre in this way:

...full of young guys with no social lives, no sex lives and no hope of ever moving out of their mothers' basements ... They're total wankers and losers who indulge in Messianic fantasies about someday getting even with the world through almost-magical computer skills, but whose actual use of the Net amounts to dialing up the scatophilia forum and downloading a few disgusting pictures. You know, cyberpunks.

== Style and ethos ==
Primary figures in the cyberpunk movement include William Gibson, Neal Stephenson, Bruce Sterling, Bruce Bethke, Pat Cadigan, Rudy Rucker, and John Shirley. Philip K. Dick (author of Do Androids Dream of Electric Sheep?, from which the film Blade Runner was adapted) is also seen by some as prefiguring the movement.

Blade Runner can be seen as a quintessential example of the cyberpunk style and theme. Video games, board games, and tabletop role-playing games, such as Cyberpunk and Shadowrun, often feature storylines that are heavily influenced by cyberpunk writing and movies. Beginning in the early 1990s, some trends in fashion and music were also labeled as cyberpunk. Cyberpunk is also featured prominently in anime and manga (Japanese cyberpunk), with Akira, Ghost in the Shell and Cowboy Bebop being among the most notable.

=== Setting ===
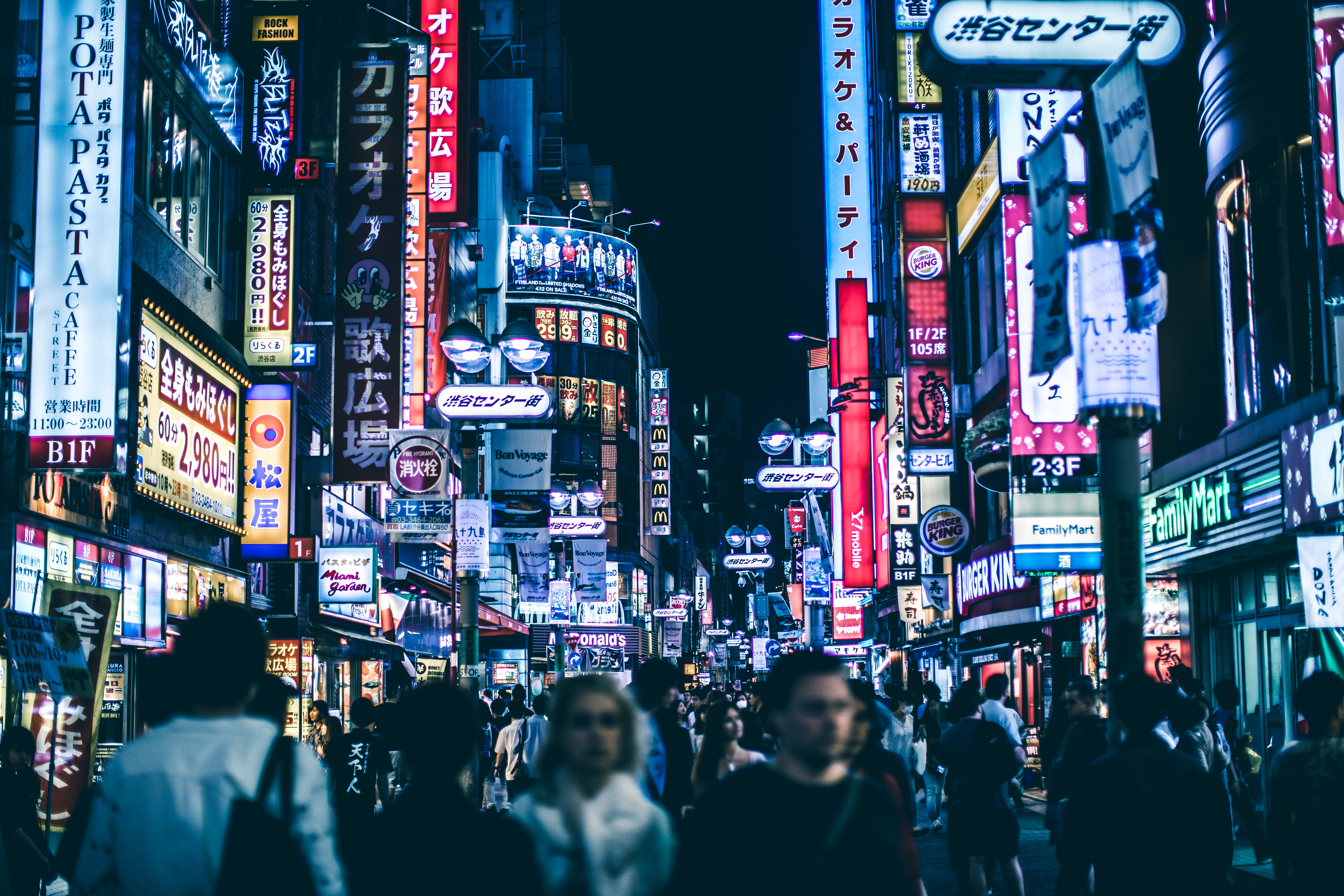
Shibuya, Tokyo, Japan

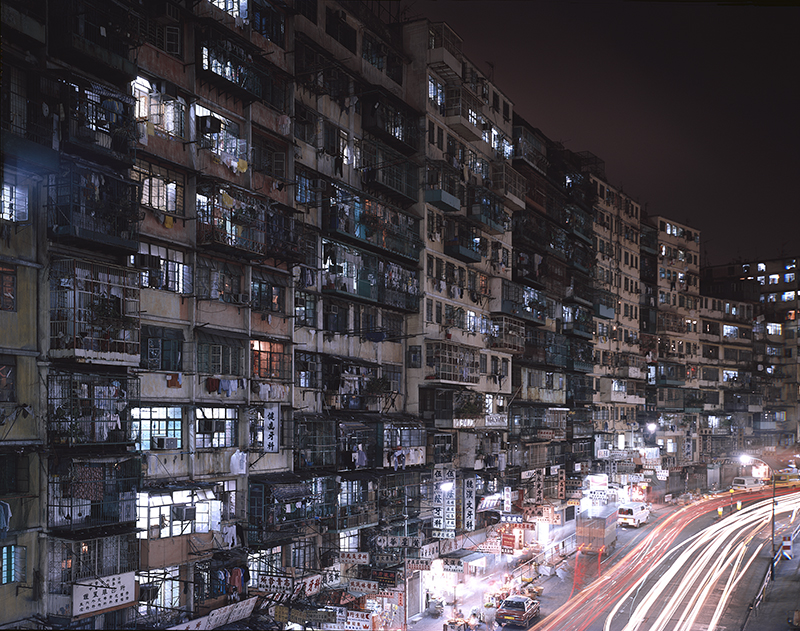
Life in Kowloon Walled City has often inspired the dystopian identity in modern media works.

Cyberpunk writers tend to use elements from crime fiction—particularly hardboiled detective fiction and film noir—and postmodernist prose to describe an often nihilistic underground side of an electronic society. The genre's vision of a troubled future is often called the antithesis of the generally utopian visions of the future popular in the 1940s and 1950s. Gibson defined cyberpunk's antipathy towards utopian science fiction in his 1981 short story "The Gernsback Continuum", which pokes fun at and, to a certain extent, condemns utopian science fiction.

In some cyberpunk writing, much of the action takes place online, in cyberspace, blurring the line between actual and virtual reality. A typical trope in such work is a direct connection between the human brain and computer systems. Cyberpunk settings are dystopias with corruption, computers, and computer networks.

The economic and technological state of Japan is a regular theme in the cyberpunk literature of the 1980s. Of Japan's influence on the genre, William Gibson said, "Modern Japan simply was cyberpunk." Cyberpunk is often set in urbanized, artificial landscapes, and "city lights, receding" was used by Gibson as one of the genre's first metaphors for cyberspace and virtual reality.

The cityscapes of Hong Kong has had major influences in the urban backgrounds, ambiance and settings in many cyberpunk works such as Blade Runner and Shadowrun. Ridley Scott envisioned the landscape of cyberpunk Los Angeles in Blade Runner to be "Hong Kong on a very bad day". The streetscapes of the Ghost in the Shell film were based on Hong Kong. Its director Mamoru Oshii felt that Hong Kong's strange and chaotic streets where "old and new exist in confusing relationships" fit the theme of the film well. Hong Kong's Kowloon Walled City is particularly notable for its disorganized hyper-urbanization and breakdown in traditional urban planning to be an inspiration to cyberpunk landscapes. During the British rule of Hong Kong, it was an area neglected by both the British and Qing administrations, embodying elements of liberalism in a dystopian context. Portrayals of East Asia and Asians in Western cyberpunk have been criticized as Orientalist and promoting racist tropes playing on American and European fears of East Asian dominance; this has been referred to as "techno-Orientalism". The city Chongqing in mainland China is often referred to as a "cyberpunk city".

=== Society and government ===
Cyberpunk can be intended to disquiet readers and call them to action. It often expresses a sense of rebellion, suggesting that one could describe it as a type of cultural revolution in science fiction. In the words of author and critic David Brin:

... a closer look [at cyberpunk authors] reveals that they nearly always portray future societies in which governments have become wimpy and pathetic ... Popular science fiction tales by Gibson, Williams, Cadigan and others do depict Orwellian accumulations of power in the next century, but nearly always clutched in the secretive hands of a wealthy or corporate elite.

Cyberpunk stories have also been seen as fictional forecasts of the evolution of the Internet. The earliest descriptions of a global communications network came long before the World Wide Web entered popular awareness, though not before traditional science-fiction writers such as Arthur C. Clarke and some social commentators such as James Burke began predicting that such networks would eventually form.

Some observers cite that cyberpunk tends to marginalize sectors of society such as women and people of colour. It is claimed that, for instance, cyberpunk depicts fantasies that ultimately empower masculinity using fragmentary and decentered aesthetic that culminate in a masculine genre populated by male outlaws. Critics also note the absence of any reference to Africa or black characters in the quintessential cyberpunk film Blade Runner, while other films reinforce stereotypes.

== Media ==
=== Literature ===
Minnesota writer Bruce Bethke coined the term in 1983 for his short story "Cyberpunk", which was published in an issue of Amazing Science Fiction Stories. The term was quickly appropriated as a label to be applied to the works of William Gibson, Bruce Sterling, Pat Cadigan and others. Of these, Sterling became the movement's chief ideologue, thanks to his fanzine Cheap Truth. John Shirley wrote articles on Sterling and Rucker's significance. John Brunner's 1975 novel The Shockwave Rider is considered by many to be the first cyberpunk novel with many of the tropes commonly associated with the genre, some five years before the term was popularized by Dozois.

William Gibson with his novel Neuromancer (1984) is arguably the most famous writer connected with the term cyberpunk. He emphasized style, a fascination with surfaces, and atmosphere over traditional science-fiction tropes. Regarded as ground-breaking and sometimes as "the archetypal cyberpunk work", Neuromancer was awarded the Hugo, Nebula, and Philip K. Dick Awards. Count Zero (1986) and Mona Lisa Overdrive (1988) followed after Gibson's popular debut novel. According to the Jargon File, "Gibson's near-total ignorance of computers and the present-day hacker culture enabled him to speculate about the role of computers and hackers in the future in ways hackers have since found both irritatingly naïve and tremendously stimulating."

Early on, cyberpunk was hailed as a radical departure from science-fiction standards and a new manifestation of vitality. Shortly thereafter, some critics arose to challenge its status as a revolutionary movement. These critics said that the science fiction New Wave of the 1960s was much more innovative as far as narrative techniques and styles were concerned. While Neuromancer's narrator may have had an unusual "voice" for science fiction, much older examples can be found: Gibson's narrative voice, for example, resembles that of an updated Raymond Chandler, as in his novel The Big Sleep (1939).

Others noted that almost all traits claimed to be uniquely cyberpunk could in fact be found in older writers' works—often citing J. G. Ballard, Philip K. Dick, Harlan Ellison, Stanisław Lem, Samuel R. Delany, and even William S. Burroughs. For example, Philip K. Dick's works contain recurring themes of social decay, artificial intelligence, paranoia, and blurred lines between objective and subjective realities. The influential cyberpunk movie Blade Runner (1982) is based on his book, Do Androids Dream of Electric Sheep?. Transhumanism and technologically augmented humans are also a main feature of Roger Zelazny's Creatures of Light and Darkness (1968).

In 1994, scholar Brian Stonehill suggested that Thomas Pynchon's 1973 novel Gravity's Rainbow "not only curses but precurses what we now glibly dub cyberspace." Other important predecessors include Alfred Bester's two most celebrated novels, The Demolished Man and The Stars My Destination, as well as Vernor Vinge's novella True Names.

==== Reception and impact ====
Science-fiction writer David Brin describes cyberpunk as "the finest free promotion campaign ever waged on behalf of science fiction". It may not have attracted the "real punks", but it did ensnare many new readers, and it provided the sort of movement that postmodern literary critics found alluring. Cyberpunk made science fiction more attractive to academics, argues Brin; in addition, it made science fiction more profitable to Hollywood and to the visual arts generally. Although the "self-important rhetoric and whines of persecution" on the part of cyberpunk fans were irritating at worst and humorous at best, Brin declares that the "rebels did shake things up. We owe them a debt."

Fredric Jameson considers cyberpunk the "supreme literary expression if not of postmodernism, then of late capitalism itself".

Cyberpunk further inspired many later writers to incorporate cyberpunk ideas into their own works, such as George Alec Effinger's When Gravity Fails. Wired magazine, created by Louis Rossetto and Jane Metcalfe, mixes new technology, art, literature, and current topics in order to interest today's cyberpunk fans, which Paula Yoo claims "proves that hardcore hackers, multimedia junkies, cyberpunks and cellular freaks are poised to take over the world".

=== Film and television ===
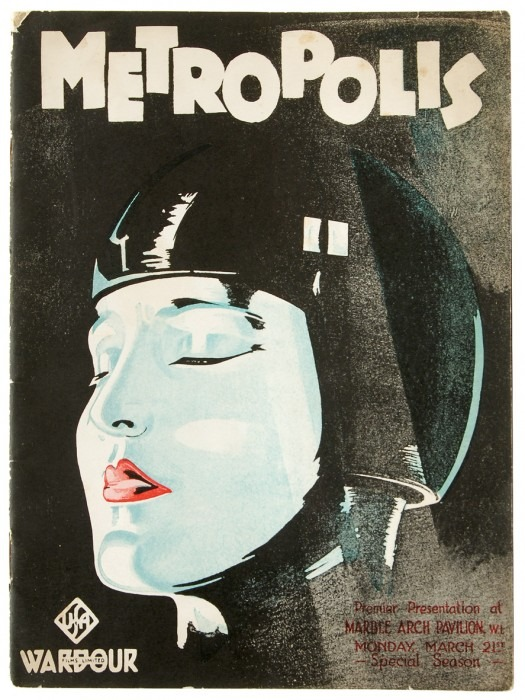
Metropolis (1927) is considered a work of proto-cyberpunk.

The film Blade Runner (1982) is set in 2019 in a dystopian future in which manufactured beings called replicants are slaves used on space colonies and are legal prey on Earth to various bounty hunters who "retire" (kill) them. Although Blade Runner was largely unsuccessful in its first theatrical release, it found a viewership in the home video market and became a cult film. Since the movie omits the religious and mythical elements of Dick's original novel (e.g. empathy boxes and Wilbur Mercer), it falls more strictly within the cyberpunk genre than the novel does. William Gibson later revealed that upon first viewing the film, he was surprised at how the look of this film matched his vision for Neuromancer, a book he was then working on. The film's tone has since been the staple of many cyberpunk movies, such as The Matrix trilogy (1999–2003), which uses a wide variety of cyberpunk elements. A sequel to Blade Runner was released in 2017.

The TV series Max Headroom (1987) is an iconic cyberpunk work, taking place in a futuristic dystopia ruled by an oligarchy of television networks. Computer hacking played a central role in many of the story lines. Max Headroom has been called "the first cyberpunk television series". More recently, the animated series Batman Beyond (1999–2001) is considered a noteworthy example of the cyberpunk genre.

The number of films in the genre has grown steadily since Blade Runner. Several of Philip K. Dick's works have been adapted to the silver screen. The films Johnny Mnemonic (1995) and New Rose Hotel (1998), both based on short stories by William Gibson, flopped commercially and critically. Other cyberpunk films include RoboCop (1987), Total Recall (1990), Hardware (1990), The Lawnmower Man (1992), 12 Monkeys (1995), Hackers (1995), and Strange Days (1995). Some cyberpunk films have been described as tech-noir, a hybrid genre combining neo-noir and science fiction or cyberpunk.

=== Anime and manga ===
The Japanese cyberpunk subgenre began in 1982 with the debut of Katsuhiro Otomo's manga series Akira, with its 1988 anime film adaptation, which Otomo directed, later popularizing the subgenre. Akira inspired a wave of Japanese cyberpunk works, including manga and anime series such as Ghost in the Shell, Battle Angel Alita, and Cowboy Bebop. Other early Japanese cyberpunk works include the 1982 film Burst City, and the 1989 film Tetsuo: The Iron Man.

According to Paul Gravett, when Akira began to be published, cyberpunk literature had not yet been translated into Japanese. Otomo has distinct inspirations, such as Mitsuteru Yokoyama's manga series Tetsujin 28-go (1956–1966) and Mœbius.

In contrast to Western cyberpunk which has roots in New Wave science fiction literature, Japanese cyberpunk has roots in underground music culture, specifically the Japanese punk subculture that arose from the Japanese punk music scene in the 1970s. The filmmaker Sogo Ishii introduced this subculture to Japanese cinema with the punk film Panic High School (1978) and the punk biker film Crazy Thunder Road (1980), both portraying the rebellion and anarchy associated with punk, and the latter featuring a punk biker gang aesthetic. Ishii's punk films paved the way for Otomo's seminal cyberpunk work Akira.

Cyberpunk themes are widely visible in anime and manga. In Japan, where cosplay is popular and not only teenagers display such fashion styles, cyberpunk has been accepted and its influence is widespread. William Gibson's Neuromancer, whose influence dominated the early cyberpunk movement, was also set in Chiba, one of Japan's largest industrial areas – although at the time of writing the novel Gibson did not know the location of Chiba and had no idea how perfectly it fit his vision in some ways. The exposure to cyberpunk ideas and fiction in the 1980s has allowed it to seep into the Japanese culture.

Cyberpunk anime and manga draw upon a futuristic vision which has elements in common with Western science fiction and therefore have received wide international acceptance outside Japan. "The conceptualization involved in cyberpunk is more of forging ahead, looking at the new global culture. It is a culture that does not exist right now, so the Japanese concept of a cyberpunk future, seems just as valid as a Western one, especially as Western cyberpunk often incorporates many Japanese elements." William Gibson is now a frequent visitor to Japan, and he came to see that many of his visions of Japan have become a reality:

Modern Japan simply was cyberpunk. The Japanese themselves knew it and delighted in it. I remember my first glimpse of Shibuya, when one of the young Tokyo journalists who had taken me there, his face drenched with the light of a thousand media-suns—all that towering, animated crawl of commercial information—said, "You see? You see? It is Blade Runner town." And it was. It so evidently was.

==== Influence ====
Akira (1982 manga) and its 1988 anime film adaptation have influenced numerous works in animation, comics, film, music, television and video games. Akira has been cited as a major influence on Hollywood films such as The Matrix, Chronicle, Looper, Midnight Special, and Inception, as well as cyberpunk-influenced video games such as Hideo Kojima's Snatcher and Metal Gear Solid, Valve's Half-Life series and Dontnod Entertainment's Remember Me. Akira has also influenced the work of musicians such as Kanye West, who paid homage to Akira in the "Stronger" music video, and Lupe Fiasco, whose album Tetsuo & Youth is named after Tetsuo Shima. The popular bike from the film, Kaneda's Motorbike, appears in Steven Spielberg's film Ready Player One, and CD Projekt's video game Cyberpunk 2077.

An interpretation of digital rain, similar to the images used in Ghost in the Shell and later in The Matrix

Ghost in the Shell (1995) influenced a number of prominent filmmakers, most notably the Wachowskis in The Matrix (1999) and its sequels. The Matrix series took several concepts from the film, including the Matrix digital rain, which was inspired by the opening credits of Ghost in the Shell and a sushi magazine the wife of the senior designer of the animation, Simon Witheley, had in the kitchen at the time, and the way characters access the Matrix through holes in the back of their necks. Other parallels have been drawn to James Cameron's Avatar, Steven Spielberg's A.I. Artificial Intelligence, and Jonathan Mostow's Surrogates. James Cameron cited Ghost in the Shell as a source of inspiration, citing it as an influence on Avatar.

The original video animation Megazone 23 (1985) has a number of similarities to The Matrix. Battle Angel Alita (1990) has had a notable influence on filmmaker James Cameron, who was planning to adapt it into a film since 2000. It was an influence on his TV series Dark Angel, and he is the producer of the 2019 film adaptation Alita: Battle Angel.

=== Comics ===
In 1975, artist Moebius collaborated with writer Dan O'Bannon on a story called The Long Tomorrow, published in the French magazine Métal Hurlant. One of the first works featuring elements now seen as exemplifying cyberpunk, it combined influences from film noir and hardboiled crime fiction with a distant sci-fi environment. Author William Gibson stated that Moebius' artwork for the series, along with other visuals from Métal Hurlant, strongly influenced his 1984 novel Neuromancer. The series had a far-reaching impact in the cyberpunk genre, being cited as an influence on Ridley Scott's Alien (1979) and Blade Runner. In an interview, Gibson recalled a lunch with Scott during which both acknowledged their shared debt to Moebius's work in Métal Hurlant.

Moebius expanded upon The Long Tomorrow's aesthetic with The Incal, a graphic novel collaboration with Alejandro Jodorowsky published from 1980 to 1988. The story centers around the exploits of a detective named John Difool in various science fiction settings, and while not confined to the tropes of cyberpunk, it features many elements of the genre. Moebius was one of the designers of Tron (1982), a movie that shows a world inside a computer.

Concurrently with many other foundational cyberpunk works, DC Comics published Frank Miller's six-issue miniseries Rōnin from 1983 to 1984. The series, incorporating aspects of Samurai culture, martial arts films and manga, is set in a dystopian near-future New York. It explores the link between an ancient Japanese warrior and the apocalyptic, crumbling cityscape he finds himself in. The comic also bears several similarities to Akira, with highly powerful telepaths playing central roles, as well as sharing many key visuals.

Rōnin would go on to influence many later works, including Samurai Jack and the Teenage Mutant Ninja Turtles, as well as video games such as Cyberpunk 2077. Two years later, Miller himself would incorporate several toned-down elements of Rōnin into his acclaimed 1986 miniseries The Dark Knight Returns, in which a retired Bruce Wayne once again takes up the mantle of Batman in a Gotham that is increasingly becoming more dystopian.

Paul Pope's Batman: Year 100, published in 2006, also exhibits several traits typical of cyberpunk fiction, such as a rebel protagonist opposing a future authoritarian state, and a distinct retrofuturist aesthetic that makes callbacks to both The Dark Knight Returns and Batman's original appearances in the 1940s.

=== Games ===
There are many cyberpunk video games. Popular series include the Megami Tensei series, Kojima's Snatcher and Metal Gear series, Deus Ex series, Syndicate series, and System Shock and its sequel. Other games, like Blade Runner, Ghost in the Shell, and the Matrix series, are based upon genre movies, or role-playing games (for instance the various Shadowrun games).

Several RPGs called Cyberpunk exist: Cyberpunk (later known as Cyberpunk 2013), Cyberpunk 2020, Cyberpunk v3.0 and Cyberpunk Red written by Mike Pondsmith and published by R. Talsorian Games, and GURPS Cyberpunk, published by Steve Jackson Games as a module of the GURPS family of RPGs. Cyberpunk 2020 was designed with the settings of William Gibson's writings in mind, and to some extent with his approval, unlike the approach taken by FASA in producing the transgenre Shadowrun game and its various sequels, which mixes cyberpunk with fantasy elements such as magic and fantasy races such as orcs and elves. Both are set in the near future, in a world where cybernetics are prominent. Iron Crown Enterprises released an RPG named Cyberspace, which was out of print for several years until recently being re-released in online PDF form. CD Projekt Red released Cyberpunk 2077, a cyberpunk open world first-person shooter/role-playing video game (RPG) based on the tabletop RPG Cyberpunk, on December 10, 2020.

In 1990, in a convergence of cyberpunk art and reality, the United States Secret Service raided Steve Jackson Games's headquarters and confiscated all their computers. Officials denied that the target had been the GURPS Cyberpunk sourcebook, but Jackson later wrote that he and his colleagues "were never able to secure the return of the complete manuscript; [...] The Secret Service at first flatly refused to return anything – then agreed to let us copy files, but when we got to their office, restricted us to one set of out-of-date files – then agreed to make copies for us, but said "tomorrow" every day from March 4 to March 26. On March 26 we received a set of disks which purported to be our files, but the material was late, incomplete and well-nigh useless." Steve Jackson Games won a lawsuit against the Secret Service, aided by the new Electronic Frontier Foundation. This event has achieved a sort of notoriety, which has extended to the book itself as well. All published editions of GURPS Cyberpunk have a tagline on the front cover, which reads "The book that was seized by the U.S. Secret Service!" Inside, the book provides a summary of the raid and its aftermath.

Cyberpunk has also inspired several tabletop, miniature and board games such as Necromunda by Games Workshop. Netrunner is a collectible card game introduced in 1996, based on the Cyberpunk role-playing game. Tokyo NOVA, debuting in 1993, is a cyberpunk role-playing game that uses playing cards instead of dice.

=== Music ===
Much of the industrial/dance heavy album "Cyberpunk"—recorded in Billy Idol's Macintosh-run studio—revolves around Idol's theme of the common man rising up to fight against a faceless, soulless, corporate world.

— Julie Romandetta

The first overtly cyberpunk song is The Rezillos' "2000 AD", on their 1978 album Can't Stand the Rezillos. Cyberpunk music was popularized by the synthesizer-heavy scores of cyberpunk films such as Escape from New York (1981) and Blade Runner (1982). Some musicians and acts have been classified as cyberpunk due to their aesthetic style and musical content. Often dealing with dystopian visions of the future or biomechanical themes, some fit more squarely in the category than others. Bands whose music has been classified as cyberpunk include Psydoll, Front Line Assembly, Clock DVA, Angelspit and Sigue Sigue Sputnik.

Some musicians not normally associated with cyberpunk have at times been inspired to create concept albums exploring such themes. Albums such as the British musician and songwriter Gary Numan's Tubeway Army, Replicas, The Pleasure Principle and Telekon were heavily inspired by the works of Philip K. Dick. Kraftwerk's The Man-Machine and Computer World albums both explored the theme of humanity becoming dependent on technology. Nine Inch Nails' concept album Year Zero also fits into this category. Fear Factory concept albums are heavily based upon future dystopia, cybernetics, clash between man and machines, virtual worlds.

Billy Idol's Cyberpunk drew heavily from cyberpunk literature and the cyberdelic counter culture in its creation. 1. Outside, a cyberpunk narrative fueled concept album by David Bowie, was warmly met by critics upon its release in 1995. Many musicians have also taken inspiration from specific cyberpunk works or authors, including Sonic Youth, whose albums Sister and Daydream Nation take influence from the works of Philip K. Dick and William Gibson respectively. Madonna's 2001 Drowned World Tour opened with a cyberpunk section, where costumes, aesthetics and stage props were used to accentuate the dystopian nature of the theatrical concert. Lady Gaga used a cyberpunk-persona and visual style for her sixth studio album Chromatica (2020).

Vaporwave and synthwave are also influenced by cyberpunk. The former has been inspired by one of the messages of cyberpunk and is interpreted as a dystopian critique of capitalism in the vein of cyberpunk and the latter is more surface-level, inspired only by the aesthetic of cyberpunk as a nostalgic retrofuturistic revival of aspects of cyberpunk's origins.

== Social impact ==
=== Art and architecture ===
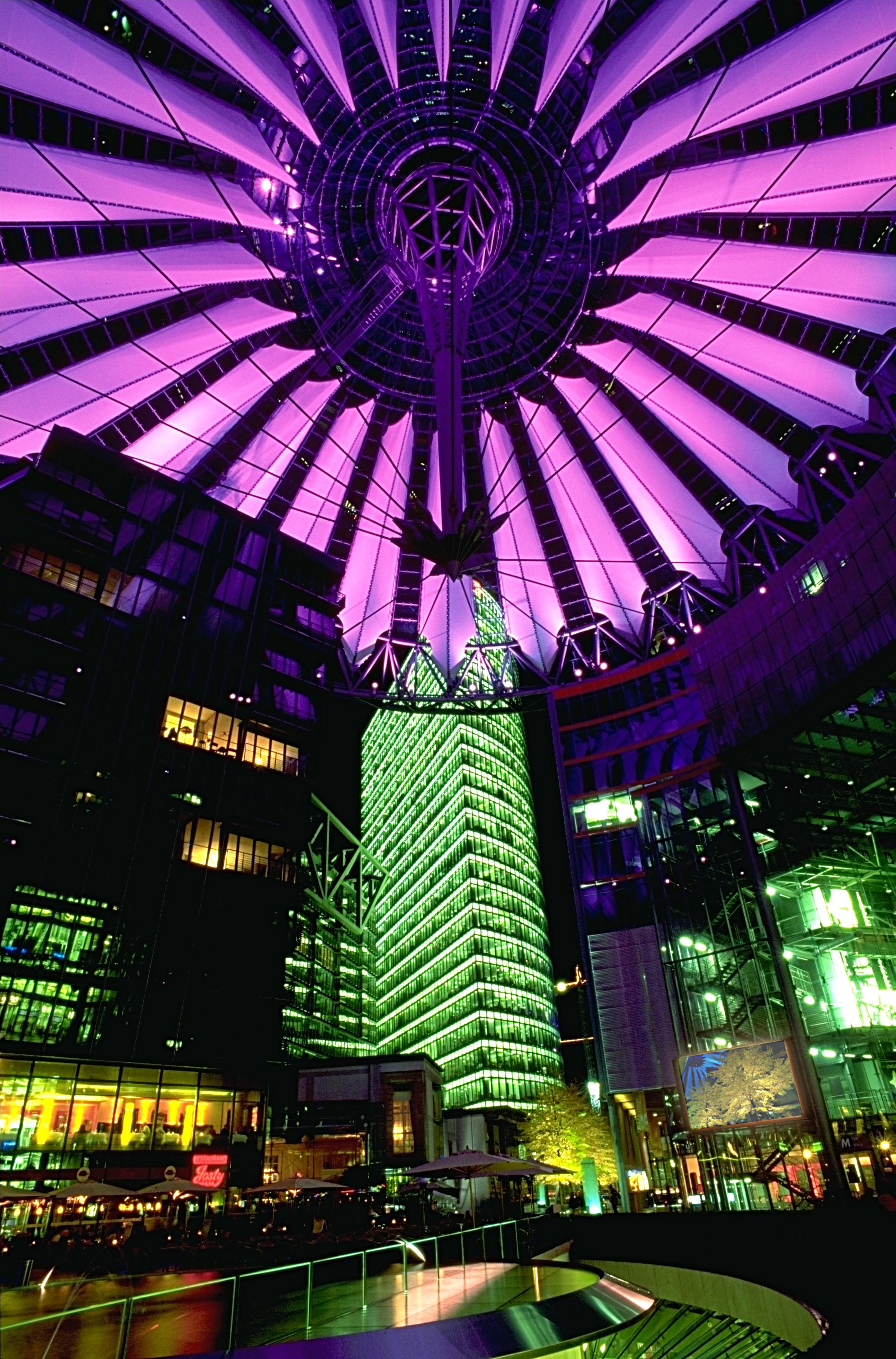
Berlin's Center Potsdamer Platz, opened in 2000, has been described as having a cyberpunk aesthetic.

Writers David Suzuki and Holly Dressel describe the cafes, brand-name stores and video arcades of the Center Potsdamer Platz in the Potsdamer Platz public square of Berlin, Germany, as "a vision of a cyberpunk, corporate urban future".

=== Society and counterculture ===
Several subcultures have been inspired by cyberpunk fiction. These include the cyberdelic counterculture of the late 1980s and early 1990s. Cyberdelic, whose adherents referred to themselves as "cyberpunks", attempted to blend the psychedelic art and drug movement with the technology of cyberculture. Early adherents included Timothy Leary, Mark Frauenfelder and R. U. Sirius. The movement largely faded following the dot-com bubble implosion of 2000.

Cybergoth is a fashion and dance subculture which draws its inspiration from cyberpunk fiction, as well as rave and Gothic subcultures. A distinct cyberpunk fashion emerged in the 2020s which rejects the raver and goth influences of cybergoth, and draws inspiration from urban street fashion, "post-apocalypse", functional clothing, high-tech sports wear, tactical uniform and multifunction. This fashion goes by names like "tech wear", "goth ninja" or "tech ninja".

Angus Tsui's fashion designs have been described as cyberpunk.

The Kowloon Walled City in Hong Kong, demolished in 1994, is often referenced as the model cyberpunk/dystopian slum as, given its poor living conditions at the time coupled with the city's political, physical, and economic isolation has caused many in academia to be fascinated by the ingenuity of its spawning.

=== Cyberpunk derivatives ===
As a wider variety of writers began to work with cyberpunk concepts, new subgenres of science fiction emerged, some of which could be considered as playing off the cyberpunk label, others which could be considered as legitimate explorations into newer territory. These focused on technology and its social effects in different ways. One prominent subgenre is "steampunk," which is set in an alternate history Victorian era that combines anachronistic technology with cyberpunk's bleak film noir world view. The term was originally coined around 1987 as a joke to describe some of the novels of Tim Powers, James P. Blaylock, and K.W. Jeter, but by the time Gibson and Sterling entered the subgenre with their collaborative novel The Difference Engine the term was being used earnestly as well.

Another subgenre is "biopunk" (cyberpunk themes dominated by biotechnology) from the early 1990s, a derivative style building on biotechnology rather than informational technology. In these stories, people are changed in some way not by mechanical means, but by genetic manipulation.

== Registered trademark status ==
In the United States, the term "Cyberpunk" is a registered trademark owned by CD Projekt SA who obtained it from the previous owner R. Talsorian Games Inc. who originally registered it for its tabletop role-playing game. R. Talsorian Games currently used the trademark under license from CD Projekt SA for the tabletop role-playing game.

Within the European Union, the "Cyberpunk" trademark is owned by two parties: CD Projekt SA for "games and online gaming services" (particularly for the video game adaptation of the former) and by Sony Music for use outside games.

== See also ==
- Cyborg
- Digital dystopia
- Postcyberpunk
- Posthumanization
- Solarpunk
- Utopian and dystopian fiction
- Cyberdeck
