= John Arden =

British playwright (1930–2012)

- Arden c. 1960
- Born: 26 October 1930
- Died: 28 March 2012 (aged 81)
- Occupation: Playwright
- Spouse: Margaretta D'Arcy (m. 1957)

John Arden (26 October 1930 – 28 March 2012) was an English playwright who at his death was lauded as "one of the most significant British playwrights of the late 1950s and early 60s".

== Career ==
Born in Barnsley, son of the manager of a glass factory, he was educated at Sedbergh School in Cumbria, King's College, Cambridge, and the Edinburgh College of Art, where he studied architecture. He first gained critical attention for the radio play The Life of Man in 1956 shortly after finishing his studies.

Arden was initially associated with the English Stage Company at the Royal Court Theatre in London. His 1959 play, Serjeant Musgrave's Dance, in which four army deserters arrive in a northern mining town to exact retribution for an act of colonial violence, is considered to be his best. His work was influenced by Bertolt Brecht and Epic Theatre as in Left-Handed Liberty (1965, on the anniversary of Magna Carta). Other plays include Live Like Pigs, The Workhouse Donkey, and Armstrong's Last Goodnight, the last of which was performed at the 1965 Chichester Festival by the National Theatre after it was rejected by the Royal Court. In 1964 he joined the Who Killed Kennedy? Committee set up by Bertrand Russell.

His 1978 radio play Pearl was considered in a Guardian survey to be one of the best plays in that medium. He also wrote several novels, including Silence Among the Weapons, which was shortlisted for the Booker Prize in 1982, and Books of Bale, about the Protestant apologist John Bale. He was a member of the Royal Society of Literature.

With his wife and co-writer Margaretta D'Arcy he picketed the RSC premiere of his Arthurian play The Island of the Mighty, because they thought the production was pro-imperialist, and they wrote several plays together which were highly critical of the British presence in Ireland, where he and D'Arcy lived from 1971 onward.

In 1961, he was a founder member of the anti-nuclear Committee of 100, and he also chaired the pacifist weekly Peace News. In Ireland, he was for a while a member of Official Sinn Féin. He was an advocate of civil liberties, and opposed anti-terror legislation, as demonstrated in his 2007 radio play The Scam.

== Last years and death ==
He was elected to Aosdána, an Irish arts academy, in 2011 before dying in Galway in 2012. He was waked in a wicker casket.

== Awards ==
- Evening Standard Award, 1960
- John Whiting Award, 1973
- V. S. Pritchett Award, 2003
- Booker Prize shortlist, 1982
- Giles Cooper Award, 1978 and 1982

== Works ==
(Selected)

=== Books ===
- Arden, John (1977), To present the pretence: essays on the theatre and its public, London: Methuen, ISBN 978-0413381507
- Arden, John (1982), Silence among the weapons: some events at the time of the failure of a republic, London: Methuen, ISBN 978-0413496706
- Arden, John, (2009), Gallows and other Tales of Suspicion and Obsession, Original Writing, Dublin, ISBN 978-1-907179-19-8
- D'Arcy, Margaretta; Arden, John (1988), Awkward corners: essays, papers, fragments, London: Methuen, ISBN 978-0-413-40340-7
- D'Arcy, Margaretta; Arden, John (1991), Plays: 1: The Business of Good Government, The Royal Pardon, The Little Gray Home in the West, Ars Longa Vita Brevis, Friday's Hiding, Vandaleur's Folly, and Immediate Rough Theatre, Methuen Publishing Limited, ISBN 978-0-413-65150-1
- D'Arcy, Margaretta; Arden, John (1996), Galways Pirate Women, a Global Trawl, Women's Pirate Press, ISBN 978-0-9528206-0-4

=== Plays by John Arden ===
- Serjeant Musgrave's Dance: an Unhistorical Parable (1960)
- Live Like Pigs (1958)
- The workhouse donkey: a vulgar melodrama (1964)
- Armstrong's last goodnight (1965), based on the story of Johnnie Armstrong
- Ironhand: adapted by John Arden from Goethe's Goetz von Berlichingen (1965)
- Left-handed liberty (1965)
- Two autobiographical plays: the true history of Squire Jonathan and his unfortunate treasure, and The bagman, or the impromptu of Muswell Hill (1971)
- Pearl: a play about a play within the play (1979)
- Books of Bale (1988)
- Cogs tyrannic (1992)
- Jack Juggler and the emperor's whore: seven tall tales linked together for an indecorous toy theatre (1995)
- Stealing Steps (2003)

Plays written in collaboration with Margaretta D'Arcy include:

- The Happy Haven (1960)
- The Business of Good Government: a Christmas Play (1963)
- Ars Longa Vita Brevis (1965)
- The Royal Pardon (1967)
- The Hero Rises Up (1969)
- The Island of the Mighty trilogy (Part I, "Two Wild Young Noblemen: Concerning Balin and Balan and How Ignorant They Were"; Part II, "Oh the Cruel Winter: Concerning Arthur – Flow He Refused to See That the Power of His Army Was Finished"; and Part III, "A Handful of Watercress: Concerning Merlin – How He Needed to Be Alone and Then How He Needed Not to Be Alone") (1972)
- The Ballygombeen Bequest
- The Non-Stop Connolly Show: a dramatic cycle of continuous struggle in six parts (1977)
- Vandaleur's folly: an Anglo-Irish melodrama: the hazard of experiment in an Irish co-operative, Ralahine, 1831 (1981)
- The little gray home in the west: an Anglo-Irish melodrama (1982)
- Keep the People Moving (BBC Radio);
- Portrait of a Rebel (RTÉ Television);
- The Manchester Enthusiasts (BBC 1984 and RTÉ 1984 under the title The Ralahine Experiment);
- Whose is the Kingdom? (9-part radio play, BBC 1987).

== See also ==
- List of winners and shortlisted authors of the Booker Prize for Fiction
