= Tokyo NOVA =

- Tokyo NOVA The Detonation cover
- Designers: Tarou Suzufuki, F.E.A.R.
- Publishers: Enterbrain, Game Field
- Publication: 1993 1st Edition; 1995 2nd Edition; 1998 The Revolution (3rd Edition); 2002 The Revolution REVISED (3.5); 2003 The Detonation (4th Edition)
- Genres: cyberpunk
- Systems: custom

Tokyo NOVA (トーキョーN◎VA) is a cyberpunk role-playing game with a long history in Japan. It is in its fourth edition: Tokyo NOVA The Detonation. It supports stories in the cyberpunk, hardboiled crime fiction, and contemporary fantasy genres.

The setting is an alternate near-future Tokyo called "Tokyo NOVA", after a pole shift. Tokyo NOVA is a dangerous and attractive city.

Playing cards are used instead of dice in the Tokyo NOVA system. The suits of cards correspond to four abilities: Spade (♠) is reason, club (♣) is passion, heart (♥) is life, and diamond (♦) is mundaneness. This system is similar to that used by Castle Falkenstein, which Tokyo NOVA predates by a year.

The game features a "style" system, which somewhat corresponds to a character class system but represents not only the abilities and occupations of the characters but also ways of life. For example, the Kugutsu (Japanese for "puppet") style represents not only the job of a megacorp's employee but also the character's unshakable loyalty to the company.

== See also ==
- Japanese role-playing game
