= Giles Cooper Awards =

BBC Radio drama awards

The Giles Cooper Awards were honours given to plays written for BBC Radio.

Sponsored by the BBC and Methuen Drama, the awards were specifically focused on the script of the best radio drama produced in the past year. Five or six winners were chosen from the entire year's production of BBC drama, and published in a series of books. They were named after Giles Cooper, the Anglo-Irish radio dramatist who wrote over sixty scripts for BBC radio and television between 1949 and 1966.

These awards ran annually between 1978 and 1992, instigated by Richard Imison at the BBC and Geoffrey Strachan at Eyre Methuen. There was no prize money, but publication was a notable mark of permanence in the ephemeral world of broadcasting.

== List of winners ==
1978

- John Arden – Pearl (published separately as per special arrangement with Eyre Methuen)
- Richard Harris – Is It Something I Said?
- Don Haworth – Episode on a Thursday Evening
- Jill Hyem – Remember Me
- Tom Mallin – Halt! Who Goes There?
- Jennifer Phillips – Daughters of Men
- Fay Weldon – Polaris

1979

- Shirley Gee – Typhoid Mary
- Carey Harrison – I Never Killed My German
- Barrie Keeffe – Heaven Scent
- John Kirkmorris – Coxcomb
- John Peacock – Attard in Retirement
- Olwen Wymark – The Child

1980

- Stewart Parker – Kamikaze Ground Staff Reunion Dinner
- Martyn Read – Waving to a Train
- Peter Redgrave – Martyr of the Hives
- William Trevor – Beyond the Pale

1981

- Peter Barnes – The Jumping Minuses of Byzantium
- Don Haworth – Talk of Love and War
- Harold Pinter – Family Voices
- David Pownall – Beef
- J. P. Rooney – The Dead Image
- Paul Thain – The Biggest Sandcastle in the World

1982

- Rhys Adrian – Watching the Plays Together
- John Arden – The Old Man Sleeps Alone
- Harry Barton – Hoopoe Day
- Donald Chapman – Invisible Writing
- Tom Stoppard – The Dog It Was That Died
- William Trevor – Autumn Sunshine

1983

- Wally K. Daly – Time Slip
- Shirley Gee – Never in My Lifetime
- Gerry Jones – The Angels They Grow Lonely
- Steve May – No Exceptions
- Martyn Read – Scouting for Boys

1984

- Stephen Dunstone – Who Is Sylvia?
- Robert Ferguson – Transfigured Night
- Don Haworth – Daybreak
- Caryl Phillips – The Wasted Years
- Christopher Russell – Swimmer
- Rose Tremain – Temporary Shelter

1985

- Rhys Adrian – Outpatient
- Barry Collins – King Canute
- Martin Crimp – Three Attempted Acts
- David Pownall – Ploughboy Monday
- James Saunders – Menocchio
- Michael Wall – Hiroshima – The Movie

1986

- Robert Ferguson – Dreams, Secrets, Beautiful Lies
- Christina Reid – Last of a Dyin' Race
- Andrew Rissik – Anthony
- Ken Whitmore – Gingerbread House
- Valerie Windsor – Myths and Legacies

1987

- Wally K. Daly – Mary's
- Frank Dunne – Dreams of Dublin Bay
- Anna Fox – Nobby's Day
- Nigel D. Moffatt – Lifetime
- Richard Nelson – Languages Spoken Here
- Peter Tinniswood – The Village Fête

1988

- Terence Frisby – Just Remember Two Things: It's Not Fair and Don't Be Late
- Ken Blakeson – Excess Baggage
- Anthony Minghella – Cigarettes and Chocolate
- Rona Munro – Dirt Under the Carpet
- Dave Sheasby – Apple Blossom Afternoon

1989

- Elizabeth Baines – Baby Buggy
- Jennifer Johnston – O Ananias, Azarias and Misael
- David Zane Mairowitz – Stalin Sonata
- Richard Nelson – Eating Words
- Craig Warner – By Where the Old Shed Used to Be

1990

- Tony Bagley – The Machine
- David Cregan – A Butler Did It
- John Fletcher – Death and the Tango
- Tina Pepler – Song of the Forest
- Steve Walker – The Pope's Brother

1991

- Robert Glendenning – The Words Are Strange
- John Purser – Carver
- Tom Stoppard – In the Native State
- Steve Walker – Mickey Mookey
- Craig Warner – Figure with Meat
