= Roys Iron DNA =

Scottish indie electronic music band

Roys Iron DNA were a Scottish indie electronic music band, based in the Scottish Borders, North Northumberland and Edinburgh.

== Career ==
The NME praised the band for blending "musical ideas from the 60s the punk era right through to contemporary electronica, trip hop at its darkest. This is a very interesting band". After years of extensive touring of the UK and self funded single and EP releases, they released their debut album Men In Wax Jackets in November 2007 on indie label, Alex Tronic Records. On its release, the album was awarded favourable reviews in the press, with the Daily Record saying "they are music for toasting yourself after a heavy night in CC Blooms" and Scottish music magazine Is This Music? compared them to the Beta Band, noting it is "heavy on the beats, strong on the air of mystery". One track from the album, "Reason", was described by The Fly magazine as "single of the year".

Men In Wax Jackets was named album of the month by DJ Vic Galloway on his show on BBC Radio 1. To promote the album, Roy's Iron DNA toured the UK with the Lo-Fidelity Allstars and The Go! Team on separate tours.

Their second album, Under my Skin, was released in 2013, and featured a series of remixes from top Scottish producers including - Optimo (JD Twitch), Stanley Odd, DFRNT and Atom Tree. On 1 June 2015, the band released an augmented reality album, Exposure. The album was released as a tabloid style newspaper with each page scannable with a smart-phone app, enabling the reader to play an individually commissioned video for each track from the album.

The Skinny gave the band's 2007 single a rating of three stars, noting "Reason" "rolls along nicely and the layered vocals mid-song are a nice touch" and describing "Men in Wax Jackets" as "a fine tune; very trip-hop, keeping things simple and proving that less really is more."

Previously featuring

- Luke Mallet (electric guitar)
- Altoid (beats and treats)
- Loco B (drums)
- Marwood (bass)
- Steve Walker (bass)
- Ian Jackson (beats / Drums)
- Ian ThomPson (guitar, keys, vocals,)
- Callum Knox (drums, samples, effects)
- Nick Holmes (electric guitar)

== Discography ==
=== Albums ===
- Men in Wax Jackets; November 2007, Alex Tronic Records
- Under My Skin; 2013, Travelled Music
- Exposure; 2015, Travelled Music

=== Singles ===
- "Men in Wax Jackets" / "Reason"; 2007, Travelled Music
