= Shirley Gee =

British playwright (1932–2016)

Shirley Gee (25 April 1932 – 22 November 2016) was a British theatre and radio playwright and dramatist.

Born in London, she married actor Donald Gee on 30 January 1965. They had two sons; Joby (born in 1966) and Daniel (1968) and six grandchildren (in age order); Barney, Elliot, Harvey, Maisy, Ethan and Hal. She lived in Chelsea from 1965 to 2009. She then lived in Putney, London with her husband, until her death on 22 November 2016, at the age of 84.

== Awards ==
Gee won the 1979 BBC Giles Cooper Award for her radio play "Typhoid Mary"

Never in My Lifetime won the Samuel Beckett Award, 1985 Susan Smith Blackburn Prize, and the 1983 BBC Giles Cooper Award.

Her play: Stones was runner up in the 1975 Radio Times Drama Awards.

== Works ==
=== Plays ===
- Ask for the Moon. Faber and Faber. 1987. ISBN 978-0-571-13875-3., 1986
- Never in My Lifetime. Samuel French, Inc. 1993. ISBN 978-0-573-69475-2. 1984
- Typhoid Mary, 1983
- Warrior. Samuel French Ltd. 1991. ISBN 978-0-573-01931-9. 1989

=== Anthologies ===
- Best Radio Plays of 1979 (Modern Plays). Methuen. 1980. ISBN 978-0-413-47130-7.
- Wally K. Daly, ed. (1984). Best Radio Plays of 1983 (Modern Plays). Methuen. ISBN 978-0-413-55220-4.

=== Radio plays ===
- Stones, 1974;
- The Vet's Daughter, adapted from the novel by Barbara Comyns, 1976;
- Moonshine, 1977;
- Typhoid Mary, 1979;
- Bedrock, 1979;
- Men on White Horses, adapted from the novel by Pamela Haines,1981;
- Our Regiment, a documentary, 1982;
- Never in My Lifetime, 1983;
- Against the Wind, 1988, based on the life of Hannah Snell.

=== Teleplays ===
- Long Live the Babe, 1984,
- Flights, 1985.
