= Amongst Barbarians =

1989 play by Michael Wall

- Written by: Michael Wall
- Based on: True story of the Barlow and Chambers execution
- Genre: Drama
- Setting: Penang, Malaysia

Premiere
- Date: 1989
- Place: Royal Exchange Theatre, Manchester

Amongst Barbarians is a 1989 play by British playwright Michael Wall, first performed at the Royal Exchange Theatre, Manchester prior to a transfer to the Hampstead Theatre in London. It was filmed as a made-for-TV movie in 1990, which was shown as part of series five of the BBC drama anthology series, ScreenPlay. It was directed by Jane Howell and starred David Jason, Anne Carroll, Rowena Cooper, Lee Ross, Con O'Neill and Kathy Burke.

Amongst Barbarians is set far away from Margaret Thatcher's Britain in Penang, Malaysia, a former British colony, where two young Englishmen have been arrested for drug trafficking. As they both face the death penalty, their relatives travel to Penang to come to their rescue. However, they soon find out that there is nothing they can do to save the boys' lives. In the course of their futile attempts at influencing the authorities, their racism becomes more than apparent. The question which is never made explicit is who the real barbarians are.

Wall's play is based on the true story of the Barlow and Chambers execution.
