= Alex Tronic Records =

Scottish record label

- Founded: 2005
- Founder: Paul Croan
- Genre: Electronica, Electronic music
- Country of origin: United Kingdom
- Location: Edinburgh, Scotland
- Official website: http://www.alextronicrecords.co.uk

Alex Tronic Records (ATR) is a record label based in Scotland who primarily release electronic music. Their current artists include Alex Tronic, DJ Rawzi, ÅsA, Cosway, Becki Bardot, Scuba Z, Keser, Pockets of Resistance, Binary Zero, Iain Carnegie, Marvin Wilson, Strange Gravity Matthew Leigh Embleton (a.k.a. Snakestyle), Minnie Rogers, Neu Gestalt, The Psychedelic Manifesto, Roys Iron DNA, 30K, Integra TV, Forward Play, Metaltech, Pixlface, Melvitronica and Fiolent V.

== Artists ==
- Alex Tronic
- ÅsA
- Becki Bardot
- Binary Zero
- Cosway
- Dirt Diamond
- Drupad
- Fiolent V
- Forward Play
- Iain Carnegie
- Integra TV
- Keser
- Marvin Wilson
- Matthew Leigh Embleton
- Melvitronica
- Metaltech
- Minnie Rogers
- Neu Gestalt
- Pandacetamol
- Pixlface
- Pockets of Resistance
- The Psychedelic Manifesto
- Roys Iron DNA
- Snakestyle (a.k.a. Matthew Leigh Embleton)
- Synthologist
- 30K

== Catalogue ==
Albums

Cat #	Artist	Title
ATRCD01	ÅsA	On/Off
ATRCD012	Pockets of Resistance	Climate Change
ATRCD022	Keser	Esoteric Escape
ATRCD037	Roys Iron DNA	Men in Wax Jackets
ATRCD050	Marvin Wilson	Being Here
ATRCD061	Binary Zero	From Here You Can See Everything
ATRCD072	Alex Tronic	To Infinity
ATRCD083	Iain Carnegie	Rise
ATRCD094	The Psychedelic Manifesto	Lysergic Sushi
ATRCD105	Neu Gestalt	Altered Carbon
ATRCD107	Marvin Wilson	Ignite
ATRCD108	30K	No Signals
ATRCD109	Snakestyle	Turning Point
ATRCD111	IntegraTV	A morning Announcement
ATRCD115	The Psychedelic Manifesto	Trommelkoph Forever Remixes
ATRCD116	Marvin Wilson	Our Time Will Come
ATRCD117	Keser	Robo Ghost
ATRCD118	Alex Tronic	Back in the Room EP
ATRCD119	Metaltech	Alkomatik
ATRCD121	Pixlface	The Human Language EP
ATREP123	Cosway	Artificial EP
ATREP125	Pandacetamol	Headless
ATRCD126	Pandacetamol	Geometric
ATRCD128	Becki Bardot	Summer of Love EP
ATRCD130	Alex Tronic	Shifting Sands
ATRCD131	Marvin Wilson	Planetary Circuit
ATRCD133	Snakestyle	Out of Bounds EP
ATRCD134	Fiolent V	protect a Planet
ATRCD135	Snakestyle	Snakestyle World Radio
ATREP135	Melvitronica	We Aint Wise No More
ATRCD143	Neu Gestalt	Weightless Hours
ATREP144	Alex Tronic	Electricals EP
ATRCD146	Synthologist	He Died for our Synths
ATRCD147	Dirt Diamond	Debut
ATREP148	Cosway	The Ibiza Sessions
ATRCD150	Minnie Rogers	A Rainy Night EP
ATRS154	Keser	Moon House
ATRCD155	Keser	Audeamus
ATREP160	Alex Tronic, Becki Bardot	Balearica Sessions
ATRS161	Minnie Rogers (Snakestyle's Drum & Bass Remix)	A Rainy Night in London
ATREP162	Iain Carnegie	Carnegie: Silent Ceremony
ATRCD163	Drupad	Silver Dreams
ATREP164	Matthew Leigh Embleton, Susan King	Music for Lute and Laptop, Vol. 1
ATREP166	Matthew Leigh Embleton, Susan King	Music for Lute and Laptop, Vol. 2
ATRCD170	The Psychedelic Manifesto	Garden of Dreams
ATRCD666	Metaltech	Burn Your Planet
ATREP101800	Metaltech	Sex on the Dancefloor EP
ATRLIVECD01	Snakestyle	Snakestyle Live, Vol. 1
ATRLIVECD02	Snakestyle	Snakestyle Live, Vol. 2

Compilations

Cat #	Artist	Title
ATRCD0023	Alex Tronic Records	Volume 1
ATRCD112	Tronic	Volume 2
ATRVOL3	The Chillout	Volume 3
ATRVOL4	Beatup	Volume 4
Goa 2013	Volume 3	Alex Tronic - Trip to the Source (Sunshine on Leith Dub)

ATR Classical

Cat #	Artist	Title
ATREP171	Matthew Leigh Embleton, David Van Ooijen	Embleton: Music for Lute and Laptop, Vol. 3
ATREP???	Matthew Leigh Embleton, David Van Ooijen	Embleton: Music for Lute and Laptop, Vol. 4

== Background ==
Label founder Alex Tronic (Paul Croan) had previously released and licensed music to many labels notably Koyote/Peyote Records and Cherry Red Records in 2000. He also scored music for film and TV.

Alex Tronic Records was created in 2005 and their debut release was ÅsA - On/Off which was released to widespread acclaim. Other signings followed including Keser, Roys Iron DNA and Pockets of Resistance.

Keser and ÅsA went on to tour in Scandinavia after their releases. Roys Iron DNA toured with the Lo-Fidelity Allstars and The Go! Team.

Alex Tronic Records' own recording studio in central Edinburgh was proving to be pivotal in discovering newly emerging talent as well as developing their current artists.

The label's first compilation album brought these talents together and was a successful venture. The Skinny magazine described the album as "a brilliant exhibition of talent... On the whole the album is extremely varied. The only thing which doesn’t change is the production quality and raw talent, which is consistent throughout."

Future Music magazine awarded the Alex Tronic Volume 1 compilation album 7/10 and described it as "an eclectic and engaging debut...well worth checking out"

ATR Volume 1 gained radio play worldwide including BBC Radio 1.

In 2007 Alex Tronic Records signed distribution deals with Cargo Records in the U.K. and Arabesque which covers European territories, and more signings soon followed.

Croan's own album Alex Tronic - To Infinity was released on ATR in February 2009, and features contributions from artists on ATR. A follow-up was released in 2010 entitled Back in the Room, and another entitled Shifting Sands in 2011.

Alex Tronic's Electricals EP (2012) features vocalist Kirsty Brown and also includes remixes by ATR artist Snakestyle. The ideas and recordings for the EP began during Summer 2011, when Croan relocated to Ibiza to DJ and record. The EP was completed in Edinburgh during winter 2011/2012.

Alex Tronic and Becki Bardot's Balearica sessions EP features vocals from Sally Stapleton and was also released in 2012.

== See also ==
- Lists of record labels
- List of independent UK record labels
