= Esoteric Escape =

Studio album by Keser
- Released: August 2006
- Recorded: Alex Tronic Records Studio, Edinburgh, Scotland
- Genres: Post-rock, Electronic music
- Length: 60:15
- Label: Alex Tronic Records
- Producer: Paul Croan

Esoteric Escape is the debut studio album by Scottish rock and electronic band Keser.

== Overview ==
Esoteric Escape was recorded in 2006 at the studio of Alex Tronic Records in Edinburgh, Scotland, and was produced by Paul Croan. The album features guitar-driven electronic music and it is predominantly instrumental, with three exceptions, "Lost for Days", "In the Next Beginning" and "Frozen Fireworks". It consists mainly of guitar, bass, keyboards and the use of various types of drum machine.

When questioned about the influences for the sound created on Esoteric Escape, the band have been quoted as saying

..the plan from the outset was to create reflective, futuristic music with a balance of analogue and digital sounds... .

== Track listing ==
1. "FM Rocker" – 4:14
2. "4_Cycles" - 5:06
3. "Lost for Days" - 6:37
4. "Page 20" - 2:50
5. "In the Next Beginning" - 6:06
6. " Rolling V2" - 4:57
7. "Teach" - 4:21
8. "Frozen Fireworks" - 5:51
9. "Destination:Destiny" - 5:34
10. "Page 21 (Reasons to Believe)" - 6:09
11. "We are Closed on Every Tuesday" - 2:44
12. "Kontrol/Kaos" - 5:41

== Personnel ==
- Paul Croan – producer, arrangement
- Gavin Clark – recording ("In the Next Beginning", "Rolling V2", and "Kontrol/Kaos")
- David Reid – bass
- Kevan Whitley – guitar, keyboards, programming
- Geoff Allen – mastering at CaVa Studios

== Release history ==
Esoteric Escape was released in various countries in 2006 via UK label Alex Tronic Records. The label's distribution includes Cargo Records for the UK and Arabesque for the rest of the world.

Country	Release date	Record label	Format	Catalogue number
UK/Europe	August 2006	Alex Tronic Records	CD	ATRCD022
