= David Pownall =

British playwright and radio dramatist (1938–2022)

David Pownall FRSL (19 May 1938 – 21 November 2022) was a British playwright and prolific radio dramatist performed internationally, and novelist translated into several languages.

== Life and career ==
David Pownall was born in Liverpool on 19 May 1938. He attended Lord Wandsworth College as a boarder, on a scholarship, and "disliked the place intensely". He read history at Keele University, graduating in 1960.

Pownall worked as a personnel officer with the Ford Motor Company, Dagenham, Essex, from 1960-63. In 1963, Pownall moved to Zambia to take up a post as the personnel manager at Anglo American PLC and lived and worked there until 1969; he had several early plays produced there.

Returning to England to write full-time, he became the resident writer of the Century Theatre touring group, from 1970-72. He was resident writer of the Duke's Playhouse, Lancaster, from 1972–75, and had several plays produced by them. His plays incorporated reflections on the locality, and meditations on the plays of Shakespeare.

Pownall helped found the Paines Plough Theatre, originally based in Coventry, where he was resident writer from 1975-80. In 1977, his play Richard III, Part Two, first produced by Paines Plough, was taken to the Edinburgh Fringe Festival.

Deeply interested in music, he wrote several plays about the challenges of composers, both in terms of personal creativity, and, in Master Class (1983), working within the oppressive political environment of the Soviet Union under Joseph Stalin.

Pownall wrote plays for radio, as well as material for performance by children and college students. The Sutton Elms website lists with dates 75 plays broadcast by BBC radio between 1972 and 2018.

As a novelist, Pownall's early work, such as The Raining Tree War (1974) and its sequel African Horse (1975) were comic novels in the mode of Evelyn Waugh. Then came historical fantasies such as White Cutter (1988), The Catalogue of Men (1999) and The Ruling Passion (2008).

Pownall died from prostate cancer at his home in St Briavels, Gloucestershire, on 22 November 2022, aged 84. His wife Alex survived him; they have a son. Pownall also had two sons from previous marriages.

== Legacy and honours ==
- Honorary Doctorate of Letters from Keele University; and
- Elected a Fellow of the Royal Society of Literature in 1976, for the linked novels The Raining Tree War and African Horse
- Edinburgh Festival Fringe Awards for Music to Murder By (1976) and Richard III Part Two (1977).
- 1981 John Whiting Award for Beef (1981), radio play.
- New York Theatre Yearbook: Best Foreign Play on Broadway, and the London Stage Director’s Award for Livingstone and Sechele (1985).
- 1980s – Los Angeles Drama Desk Award and the Plays and Players nominations for Best Play: Master Class
- Giles Cooper Awards for two radio plays, plus a Sony Gold and two Sony Silver Awards.

== Selected works ==
Date is year produced:

- All the World Should Be Taxed (1971)
- As We Lie (1969, Zambia)
- An Audience Called Edouard (1978, pub. London: Faber and Faber, 1979)
- Babbage (2013)
- Barricade (1978)
- Beauty and the Beast (1973)
- Beef (1981, one-act radio play); in Best Radio Plays of 1981, London: Methuen Publishing, 1982)
- Black Star (1987, pub. in Plays Two, London: Oberon Books)
- Buck Ruxton (1975; pub. in The Lancaster Plays, London: Oberon Books, 2006)
- Crates on Barrels (1974, pub. in Plays for One Person, London: Oberon Books, 1997)
- Death of a Faun (1991)
- Dreams and Censorship (2010, BBC7 radio play)
- Dinner Dance (1991)
- The Dream of Chief Crazy Horse (1973, play for children; pub. London: Faber and Faber, 1975)
- The Edge (1987)
- Elgar’s Rondo (1993, pub. in The Composer Plays, London: Oberon Books, 1993)
- Elgar’s Third (1994, BBC Radio 3 radio play; pub. in The Composer Plays, London: Oberon, 1993)
- Facade (radio play, 2002)
- Flos (1982) Radio Play published in Radio Plays: Oberon (Modern Playwrights) by David Pownall (Paperback – 21 May 1998)
- Gaunt (1973, pub. in The Lancaster Plays, London: Oberon Books, 2006)
- Getting the Picture 1998, London: Oberon Books, 1998)
- The Hot Hello (1981)
- How Does the Cukoo Learn to Fly? (1970)
- How to Grow a Guerrilla (1971)
- The Human Cartoon Show (1974)
- Innocent Screams (2009, London: Oberon Books, 2009)
- King John's Jewel (1987)
- Ladybird, Ladybird (1986)
- The Last of the Wizards (1970)
- Later (1979, pub. in Plays for One Person, London: Oberon Books, 1997)
- Lile Jimmy Williamson (1975, pub. in The Lancaster Plays, London: Oberon Books, 2006)
- Lions and Lambs (1973)
- Livingstone and Sechele (1978)
- Master Class (1983 - Re: Shostakovich, Prokofiev and Joseph Stalin; London: Faber and Faber, 1983)
- Motocar (1977; London: Faber and Faber, 1979)
- Music to Murder By (1976; London: Faber and Faber, 1978)
- My Father's House (1991, pub. in Plays Two, London: Oberon Books)
- Nijinsky: Death of a Faun (1991, London: Oberon Books, 1997)
- Ploughboy Monday (1985), radio play
- Pride and Prejudice (1983)
- The Pro (1975)
- Q (1965, Zambia)
- Richard III, Part Two (1977, Edinburgh Fringe Festival; London, Faber and Faber, 1979)
- Rousseau's Tale (1990, Plays for One Person, London: Oberon Books, 1997)
- Seconds at the Fight for Madrid (1978)
- A Tale of Two Town Halls (1976, pub. in The Lancaster Plays, London: Oberon Books, 2006)
- The Viewing (1987, pub. in Plays Two, London: Oberon Books)

== Bibliography ==
- Contemporary Dramatists, pp. 439–440. St. James Press, 1988.
- Contemporary Literary Criticism, Volume 10, pp. 418–420. Gale, 1979.
- Dictionary of Literary Biography, Volume 14, Part 2, pp. 592–597. Gale, 1983.
