= Pearl (radio play) =

Pearl: A Play About a Play Within a Play
- Original language: English
- Written by: John Arden
- Characters: Pearl; Backhouse; Grimscar; Belladonna; Duchess; Gideon Grip; Captain Catso
- Genre: Drama
- Setting: England, 1640

Premiere
- Date: 3 July 1978
- Place: BBC Radio 4 London

Pearl is a 1978 radio play by award-winning English playwright John Arden. Set in England in the 1640s, the play concerns a young Irish political operative named Pearl, who, with playwright Tom Backhouse, attempts to sway the political climate in favour of the British Parliament, as part of a plan to achieve Irish sovereignty.

In the late 1970s, Arden's falling out with British theatre led BBC producer Alfred Bradley to invite him to write a play for radio. Pearl was the result.

== Production ==
John Arden's first radio play was produced in 1955, but subsequently his work for the medium consisted only of a children's nativity play and 1970's The Bagman. Producer Alfred Bradley had long wanted to produce another Arden play for radio. Arden submitted the script for Pearl, originally written for the stage, on the basis that it would be more likely to be produced on radio than in the theatre.

Melvyn Bragg interviewed Arden and producer Alfred Bradley on 1 July, in a segment of The South Bank Show that took viewers behind the scenes of the production.

Pearl was produced and broadcast on BBC Radio 4 on 3 July 1978 as an edition of The Monday Play.

=== Cast ===
- Pearl - Elizabeth Bell
- Mother Bumroll - Paula Tilbrook
- Barnabas/Male Voice - David Mahlowe
- Stage Manager/Casca/Actor - John Jardine
- Grip - Geoffrey Banks
- Sowse/Caesar - Ronald Herdman
- Grimscar/1st Commoner - Peter Jeffrey
- Backhouse/Soothsayer - David Calder
- Belladonna - Lynda Marchal
- Duchess - Kathleen Helme
- Catso/Marullus - Kenneth Alan Taylor
- Katerina/Female Voice - Jane Knowles
- Messenger/Flavius/Actor - Robert Morton
- Music composed and conducted by Stephen Boxer
- Musicians Ephraim Segerman and members of the Northern Renaissance Consort
- Produced by Alfred Bradley

== Critical reception ==
"Probably England's greatest living playwright," said The Glasgow Herald's review of the broadcast. "Arden has the audacity to play understudy to Shakespeare, interjecting music and asides, and monologues, and blood, and using a true to the spirit if not to the fact slice of history to point up the disease of our own time." Critic Simon Trussler observed autobiographical parallels between the play and Arden's life, particularly his "exile" from mainstream theatre. Trussler praised the actors' characterizations and the "armory of techniques...vast and effortlessly deployed," but believed that the work was more of a theatre play than a radio play.

Other critics felt that the production was a unique example of radio's medium specificity and artistic potential. Pearl features a complex series of shifting viewpoints that renders a stage play within the narrative of the radio play, and elicits the ability to move between on-stage, off-stage and internal dramatic spaces that other mediums cannot easily accomplish.

In 1979, the play was recognized among the first group of Giles Cooper Award winners. Originally, the judges intended to award five prizes (one for each of the BBC drama slot categories), but felt that Pearl was of such exemplary quality that it merited a "special award" regardless of category. The play was subsequently published separately from the other award winners, as per prior arrangement.

== Publication ==
Hardcover and Paperback editions were published by Eyre Methuen in 1979.
