= Women Laughing =

1989 English play

Women Laughing is a stage play written by Michael Wall in 1989. It was first produced for the stage in 1992, just after the author's death. The original version of the play, which was for radio, contained only one act. A second was added for the stage production.

Women Laughing has been performed at the Royal Exchange Manchester, the Royal Court Theatre Upstairs, the Palace Theatre Watford and was toured in 2000 by Not The National Theatre.

== Plot ==
While the husbands stand outside on the terrace, drinking and boasting; their wives are inside talking about those husbands (and laughing). In this black comedy, Colin and Stephanie have invited Tony and Maddy to lunch in Ealing. As the men uneasily try at conversation, the laughter of their wives, which seems so uninhibited in comparison with the men's struggles at communication, is a constant interruption. The women finally join the men, and a confrontation results. The play contains a second act, where these positions are reversed. Colin and Tony are now behaving freely, while the women feel more constrained. The play moves from a garden party to the grounds of a mental hospital.

== Themes ==
The pressures of modern life come out at a garden party. Themes include marriage and mental illness.
