= Headcrash =

Book by Bruce Bethke

- Author: Bruce Bethke
- Language: English
- Genre: Science fiction
- Publisher: Warner Books
- Publication date: 1995
- Publication place: United States
- Media type: Paperback
- ISBN: 978-0446602600

Headcrash is a satirical cyberpunk novel by Bruce Bethke, published in 1995 by Warner Books. It won the Philip K. Dick Award in 1995.

It follows Jack Burroughs, who loses his bureaucratic corporate job and goes undercover on the InfoBahn (internet), creating a new persona as a popular, cool virtual character aliased MAXK00L, in a virtual reality social media area:

...full of young guys with no social lives, no sex lives and no hope of ever moving out of their mothers' basements ... They're total wankers and losers who indulge in Messianic fantasies about someday getting even with the world through almost-magical computer skills, but whose actual use of the Net amounts to dialing up the scatophilia forum and downloading a few disgusting pictures. You know, cyberpunks."

Bethke unintentionally named the entire cyberpunk subgenre of science fiction in his 1983 story "Cyberpunk".

== Reception ==
Enjoying moderate sales and mixed reviews (often centering around whether the reviewer saw it as satire or a failed attempt at sincere comedy), the book went on to capture a few awards, most notably the Philip K. Dick Award for best paperback novel in 1995.
