= Alex Tronic =

- Origin: Edinburgh, Scotland
- Genre: Electronica
- Years active: 2000 to present
- Label: Alex Tronic Records
- Members: Paul Croan
- Website: Alex Tronic Homepage

Alex Tronic is Scottish electronic musician, award winning DJ, producer and label owner Paul Croan, who is based in Leith, Edinburgh, Scotland. Croan works from his private recording studio also based in Edinburgh. MusicTech magazine describe the studio as a "Vintage Synth treasure trove. His debut album To Infinity was championed by Radio 1 and the track "Chiller" made iTunes top 20.

His latest track “Strangers That Listen” feature the ethereal vocals of Constance Pennycuick. The track is accompanied with a video courtesy of the filmmaker Ben Glasgow. It was shot in Dunbar to a backdrop of stunning views of the area where Connie grew up.

The track "Smoke a Kipper" made number 17 in the top 100 Scottish songs of 2023 published by the Scottish Herald newspaper.The single "The Strangest Times" was championed by Guy Monnington on Amazing Radio who included the track in his `Against the grain playlist` The video for the track was shortlisted for video of the year by The Weekender magazine.

Alex Tronic's single "A Voice for the Silent" features the words of Australian philanthropist and animal rights activist Philip Wollen. Tronic has also had success with "Feels Like Falling", his second collaboration with Scots chanteuse Shuna Lovelle. The EP peaked at number 1 in iTunes Lounge charts in February 2018. The single has been heavily rotated on the influential radio station Chill FM. The previous single "Brave About It" released in July 2017 also made number 1 on the iTunes lounge charts.

This EP was a follow-up to the critically acclaimed CD Nature Flow which was presented as Alex Tronic V Leith Bass Team. Nature Flow has received millions of hits on the streaming service Spotify. Alex Tronic debuted on vinyl with a record entitled Mind Matters/Obsessional, which was released by Peyote Records. According to Is this music? magazine, he has mastered the "rare trick of blending familiarity with innovation" within his unique style of electronica and dance music.

Alex Tronic's debut album To Infinity was released on his own eponymous label Alex Tronic Records in 2009. The "Back in the Room EP" release followed in 2010, and Shifting Sands album was released in 2011.

Electricals EP by Alex Tronic (2012) features vocalist Kirsty Brown and also includes remixes by ATR artist Snakestyle. The ideas and recordings for the EP began during Summer 2011, when Croan relocated to Ibiza to DJ and record. The EP was completed in Edinburgh during winter 2011/12.

Alex Tronic and Becki Bardot's Balearica sessions EP features vocals from Sally Stapleton and was also released in 2012. In March 2014, Alex Tronic introduced a new project for more chilled work called Leith Bass Team which debuts a track "Magical Float". This work appears in March 2014 on Goa Beach Vol. 23. Here Alex Tronic collaborates with YSE Records on Goa Beach Vol. 23 a powerful, double CD edition packed with the finest Goa Trance and 12 finest Lounge Music Productions. The Double CD is compiled by DJ Bim and Alex Tronic (Alex Tronic Records).

Recent projects include compiling Goa Beach volumes 25/27 for Yellow Sunshine explosion Records with DJ Bim (Germany) Double CDs one side trance, one side chill, formats. They were released in April 2015.

In March 2016, Alex Tronic contributed two tracks, "Lubdub" and "Sunshine Lover" (Slow Groove edit) to Goa Beach Volume 28, distributed by Edel Kontor.

== Live performances ==
Alex Tronic's live set-up includes the use of keyboards, samplers, effects, and a laptop. Members of ÅsA, Keser and Metaltech have occasionally performed live alongside Croan as Alex Tronic Band.

=== Festival appearances ===
- Go North, Inverness, June 2009
- Belladrum Festival, August 2009
- Unique Beats, April 2010
- Kellburn Festival August 2010
- Belladrum Festival August 2011
- Audio Soup Festival September 2013
- The Royal Highland Show, Headliner, June 2014
- Belladrum Festival, August 2014
- Royal Highland Show June 2015 with DJ Becki Bardot, DJ Beef

=== Radio sessions ===
- Vic Galloway Radio 1 Scotland live session, February 2009
- BBC Scotland`s Stevie Sole has Alex Tronic in session. Some of the hottest dance music from Scotland and beyond,

02/10/2012

== Discography ==
=== Singles ===
- A Voice for the Silent featuring Philip Wollen (2019, Alex Tronic Records)
- Mind Matters/Obsessional (2000, Peyote Records)

=== Studio albums ===
- Brave about it EP ft Shuna Lovelle (2017, Alex Tronic Records)
- Nature Flow CD Album (2016, Alex Tronic Records)
- Electricals EP (2012, Alex Tronic Records)
- Shifting Sands (2011, Alex Tronic Records)
- Back in the Room EP (16 March 2010, Alex Tronic Records)
- To Infinity (2009, Alex Tronic Records)

Compilation Albums

- Anthropology Track 1 Side 2 Shanty Lounge CD Double Album (19 Feb 2010, Millennium Records)
- Panoramic (Ambient Mix) Track 17 Side 2 on Goa Beach Volume 20 (25 May 2012 Yellow Sunshine Explosion Records)
- The Chillout, Vol 3 (20 November 2012, Alex Tronic Records)
- Beatup, Vol 4 (27 November 2012, Alex Tronic Records)
- Trip to the Source (Sunshine on Leith Dub) Track 1 Side 1 on Goa Beach 13 Volume 3 (25 July 2013 Yellow Sunshine Explosion Records)
- Goa Beach Volume 23 Double CD YSE Records (25 April 2014) Compiled by DJ Bim & Alex Tronic. Cd 1 Trance (DJ Bim) Cd 2 Lounge compiled by Alex Tronic
- Goa Beach Volume 25 Double CD YSE Records (10 October 2014) Compiled by DJ Bim & Alex Tronic. Cd 1 Trance (DJ Bim) Cd 2 Lounge compiled by Alex Tronic
- Goa Beach Volume 26 Double CD YSE Records (6 March 2015) Compiled by DJ Bim & Derbus Track 8 Side 2 Everywhere I Go (featuring Kirsty Brown Vocals) Leith Bass Team -Nature Flows Side 2 Track 4
- Goa Beach Volume 27 Double CD YSE Records (22 May 2015) Compiled by DJ Bim & Alex Tronic. Cd 1 Trance (DJ Bim) Cd 2 Lounge compiled by Alex Tronic
- Goa Beach Volume 28 Double CD YSE Records (March 2016) Compiled by DJ Bim Cd2 Track 2 Sunshine Lover (slow groove edit) Track 8 Lubdub

== Music industry work ==
Croan occasionally speaks at Music Industry seminars and has been involved as an industry expert on panels for PRS for Music. The event "Make it Happen" in Inverness featured a wide variety of speakers, including Mercury Records A&R David O'Hagan, PRS for Music’s Jules Parker and Stuart Fleming, and solicitor Helen Searle.

He has also been a panelist at the Edinburgh-based Music Industry night Born To be Wide which is held monthly at Electric Circus. Here he spoke alongside Owen Morris, (Oasis, The Verve), John McLaughlin and Francis Macdonald. The seminar entitled "The Producers" was aimed at giving insight into what it takes to be a music producer in an ever-changing industry.

== Recording studio and label ==
Croan's own Recording studio Alex Tronic Records Recording studio and Alex Tronic Records label are based at Hillside Crescent in Edinburgh. He relocated temporarily to run the label, record and perform live in Ibiza in summer 2011.
