= Robo Ghost =

Robo_Ghost

Studio album by Keser
- Released: November 2009
- Recorded: Alex Tronic Records Studio, Edinburgh, Scotland
- Genre: Post-rock, electronic music
- Length: 59:25
- Label: Alex Tronic Records
- Producer: Paul Croan

Professional ratings
Review scores
Source	Rating
Altsounds	8.3/10 link
The Skinny	link

Robo Ghost is the second studio album by Scottish rock and electronic music band Keser.

== Overview ==
Robo Ghost was recorded in 2008–09 at the studio of Alex Tronic Records in Edinburgh, Scotland, and was produced by Paul Croan. The album features guitar-driven electronic music and is predominantly instrumental.

== Track listing ==
1. "Jimmy Wah" – 4:56
2. "Chiaroscuro" – 5:08
3. "Splice the Glitch" – 4:33
4. "If I Only Took a Photograph" – 4:08
5. "Acts of Dog" – 6:13
6. "Sesevenen" – 3:37
7. "Shiny Green Suit" – 3:05
8. "Diablo Canyon 1" – 3:43
9. "3 Point Play (Set Piece)" – 3:19
10. "Nonchalant Repartee" – 4:04
11. "Nerd Ensemble" – 3:11
12. "Arizona State" – 11:22

== Personnel ==
- Paul Croan – producer
- Gavin Clark – bass, keyboards, programming
- Kevan Whitley – guitar, keyboards, programming
- Dan Bartley – album artwork

== Trivia ==
Most of the song titles on the album are references or tributes to basketball, football, the Simpsons, the American humourist Maddox, and several movies, including Seven, the Matrix, and Good Morning, Vietnam.

== Release history ==
Robo_Ghost was released worldwide in 2009 via UK label Alex Tronic Records. The label's distribution includes Cargo Records for the UK and Arabesque for the rest of the world.

Country	Release date	Record label	Format	Catalogue number
UK/Europe	November 2009	Alex Tronic Records	CD	ATRCD117
