= Hiroshima: The Movie =

Hiroshima: The Movie is a radio play written by Michael Wall in 1985. It was produced by BBC Radio in that year, and later rebroadcast in 2003. The play won Sony and Giles Cooper Awards.

== Plot and characters ==
In this love story (with a bit of a twist), a Japanese girl helps a film director as he makes a film about Hiroshima.
