= Keser =

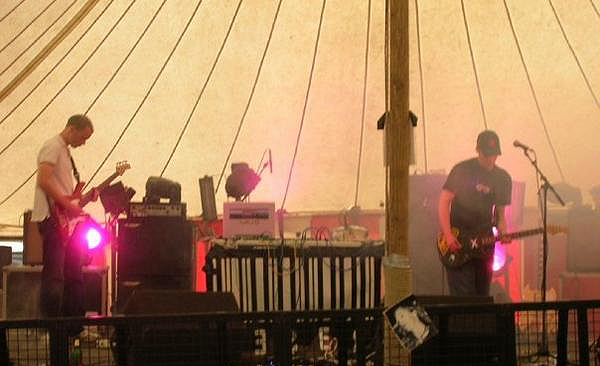
- Keser at the RockNess Festival

Background information
- Origin: Edinburgh and Glasgow, Scotland
- Genres: Electronica; Post-rock
- Years active: 2005–present
- Label: Alex Tronic Records
- Website: Official Keser website

Keser are a Scottish band from Edinburgh and Glasgow, Scotland. Keser are signed to UK indie label Alex Tronic Records, and have released three albums to date, Esoteric Escape, Robo Ghost and Audeamus. The first two albums were recorded at the Alex Tronic Records studio, with label manager and record producer Paul Croan, who also releases music as artist Alex Tronic. Audeamus was recorded at Keser's studio in Glasgow, Hidden Channel.

When performing live, Keser lean towards an instrumental, heavy, and distorted approach but will also perform quieter ambient textures within their music. This musical dynamic draws comparisons to genres like shoegaze, rock music, metal and post rock. Their live set up involves electric guitar, bass, keyboards, drum machines, effects, and samplers.

== Live highlights ==
Keser toured their debut album in Scandinavia with shows in Norway and Denmark during December 2006. Notable support shows since then include Christ., Ulrich Schnauss, The Phantom Band, Sleepy Sun, Amazing Baby and Thomas Truax.

A short headline UK tour took place in February 2010 after the release of Robo Ghost.

== Festival appearances ==
UK festivals:

- Spectrum Festival, 2007
- Stu Fest, 2007
- Leith Festival, 2008
- Edinburgh Festival Fringe 2009
- RockNess Festival, 2009
- Edinburgh Festival Fringe 2010

International festivals:

- Reeperbahn Festival in Hamburg, Germany, 2007
- Sled Island Festival in Calgary, Alberta, Canada, 2009
- North by Northeast Festival in Toronto, Ontario, Canada, 2010

== Notable radio sessions ==
Keser appeared live on Fresh Air FM Edinburgh during February and May 2007. Airplay for tracks from Esoteric Escape and Robo_Ghost also included BBC Radio Scotland, Xfm, Radio K in Minneapolis, United States, Static Airwaves, Canada and Leith FM, Edinburgh.

The Keser track "4_Cycles" was listed as one of the top 10 discoveries of 2007 for DJ Al Chivers of Leith FM (renamed 98.8_Castle_FM).

They performed live and were interviewed during a radio session on Tide/Phonanza 96,0 FM, Hamburg in 2007.

== Discography ==
Studio albums

- Esoteric Escape (2006, Alex Tronic Records)
- Robo Ghost (2009, Alex Tronic Records)
- Audeamus (2012, Alex Tronic Records)

Singles

- "Moon House" (2012, Alex Tronic Records)

Compilations

- Alex Tronic Records, Volume 1 (2007; Featured track "Horus Lives")

== Reviews ==
- Daily Record UK Review of Album Esoteric Escape
- Evil Sponge Review of Album Esoteric Escape
- Norman Records UK Review of Album Esoteric Escape
- Glasswerk Review of Alex Tronic Records Vol 1
- Losingtoday Magazine (Italy)

== Radio play ==
- BBC Radio Scotland, Keser Tracklist
- Keser Live Session Tracklist, Fresh Air FM Radio (See 24-02-07)
- Radio K Minneapolis Play List September 2007
- Radio K Minneapolis Play List March 2008
- Radio K Minneapolis Play List April 2008
- Tide/Phonanza 96,0 FM Radio, Hamburg
- Static Airwaves, Radio Laurier - Ontario, Canada
- Leith FM
- Ottic FM, Germany
- WKNC, USA
