= Psydoll =

Japanese cyberpunk band

- Origin: Japan
- Genres: Industrial, electro, gothic rock
- Years active: 1997–present
- Label: Planet Ghost Music
- Members: Nekoi; Ucchi; Loveless

Psydoll are a Japanese cyberpunk band. They formed in Tokyo in 1997 and incorporate industrial and electropop with cyberpunk imagery, musical and lyrical content. In 2003, they came to the UK to play at the Beyond the Veil gothic music festival in Leeds and gained some recognition amongst the UK industrial and gothic underground. Later that year, they returned for a mini-tour of Scotland and Northern England. Leeds based Label Planet Ghost Music, recognized the talent and signed them for their first release outside Japan. I, Psydoll is a collection of their previous two albums plus a bonus track. They then returned to the UK in 2005 for another mini-tour supporting amongst others Amen.

== Personnel ==
- Nekoi PSYDOLL (aka Rutoto Nekoi) (Vocals, Keyboards, Songs and lyrics)
- Ucchi PSYDOLL (Guitars, Arrangements and Programming)
- Loveless PSYDOLL (Actual name: Yoshinori Uenoyama) (Digital Percussion and Drums)

== Discography ==
=== Albums ===
Year	Title	Label
1997	Illumidia	(Japan only)
1998	Psyberdoll	(Japan only) Tyrell Morgue
1999	Lake/Rose, Rose, Rose	(Japan only) Tyrell Morgue
2000	The Daughter Of Dr.Neumann	(Japan only) Tyrell Morgue
2002	A War In The Box	(Japan only) Tyrell Morgue
2004	I PSYDOLL (compilation)	Planet Ghost Music
2009	10spyglasses	Psydoll Products
2011	P.S...BTW	Psydoll Products
2022	Modus Operandi Psydoll	Psydoll Products

=== Singles and EPs ===
- Fragments (Japan only) (2003)
- Sign (Japan only) (2004)
- Stories (Japan only EP) (2005)
- Dance with PSYDOLL (2008)
- Silent Insanity (2014)
- Machine Sword: Chapter 1 of Machine Kingdom (2015)
- Machine Wand: Chapter 2 of Machine Kingdom (2016)
- Machine Disk: Chapter 3 of Machine Kingdom (2017)
- Machine Cup: Chapter 4 of Machine Kingdom (2018)
- Rebirth (2020)
- Psyberdoll Resurrections (2021)

== Nekoi PSYDOLL's Book ==
- Moshi Moshi Call もしもしコール By Nekoi Rutoto 猫井るとと (ISBN 4-7659-0222-6) (Published by Kubo Shoten 久保書店 on 1985 October 1.) This 116-page book of Nekoi's comic strips, from the early to mid 1980s, is a collection of her work from Lemon People, Melon Comic, and other monthly manga magazines that she contributed to. A photo of her appears on the inside back flap of the dust jacket.
