= Brian Stonehill =

American media studies scholar

Stonehill in 1992

Brian Stonehill (December 20, 1953 – August 6, 1997) was an American media studies scholar. He was a professor of English at Pomona College in Claremont, California, where he founded the college's media studies department. He was the author of the book The Self-Conscious Novel: Artifice in Fiction from Joyce to Pynchon.
