= Bruce Bethke =

American author

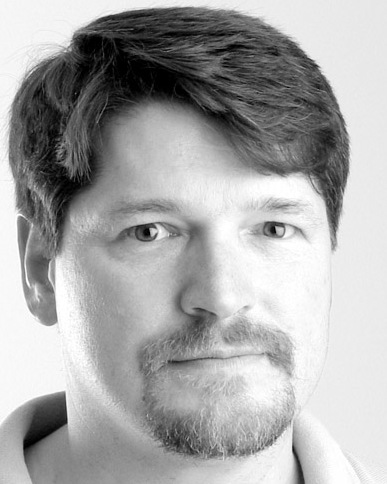
- Bruce Bethke, science fiction author, in 2001
- Born: 1955 (age 70–71); United States
- Occupation: Writer
- Writing career
- Pen name: The Original Cyberpunk
- Language: English
- Genre: Science fiction

Bruce Bethke (born 1955) is an American author best known for his 1983 short story "Cyberpunk" which led to the widespread use of the term for the cyberpunk subgenre of science fiction. His novel, Headcrash, won the Philip K. Dick Award in 1995 for SF original paperback published in the US.

Bethke's collected thoughts on the cyberpunk subculture are available on his website, in an essay entitled "The Etymology of Cyberpunk".

Bethke served as a judge on the Philip K. Dick Award in 2013.

== Life ==
Bethke lives in Minnesota where he works as a developer of supercomputer software.

== Bibliography ==
- Isaac Asimov's Robots and Aliens: Maverick: Written from an outline by Isaac Asimov in 1990, this novel was one of a series of novels set in Asimov's Robot universe.
- Headcrash: Bethke's first published novel, published in 1995. Headcrash is the story of Jack Burroughs, a computer nerd in his mid twenties, who lives with his overbearing mother, and works a dead-end job at a software firm. Jack lives a far more interesting virtual life in the metaverse, where he is an elite hacker who goes by the handle MAX_KOOL. Along with his friend Gunnar, Jack is hired to hack into a corporate system to retrieve files proving that the company was stolen from the rightful heir of its founder. This novel was awarded the Philip K. Dick Award. This work is sometimes credited with the first use of the word "Spam" as a term for junk e-mail. Bethke replies that while he appreciates the thought, the term was in common use on usenet long before he used it in Headcrash.
- Rebel Moon: A collaboration with Vox Day, Rebel Moon was the novelization of the prequel of the game Rebel Moon Rising. The main plot is similar to The Moon Is a Harsh Mistress, though the book itself focuses on a few individual characters and their battles in the war, and not the political and economic ramifications of a battle for independence on the moon.
- Wild Wild West: The novelization of the critically panned steampunk western comedy film Wild Wild West. Bethke summarily dismisses the novel on his website, stating it was how he paid for a new roof for his house.

== Controversy ==
=== "Cyberpunk" ===
Initially written as a series of short stories in 1980, the culminated novel was purchased by a publisher via an exclusive contract which forbade Bethke to sell the novel to any other publisher. The publisher decided not to release the novel, causing several years of legal battles over the rights to the book. Bethke has a downloadable version of the novel available for five dollars on his website.

When asked, during a 2005 interview, "Why was your book Cyberpunk never published when you sold it to a publisher in 1989?" Bruce replied, "Ah, well, hindsight is 20/20. The book was never released because the publisher hated the ending and I refused to rewrite it. What the publisher wanted me to write was a "Frazetta cover" ending; you know, the hero, center stage, with a mighty weapon in his hands, a cowering half-naked babe at his feet, and the blood-smeared corpses of his many enemies piled high all around. To get to this ending I would have had to end the book with the lead character committing a massacre inside a school—which is what the publisher specifically asked me to write—but even 10 years before Columbine, I found that idea utterly revolting. So I refused to write it. Perhaps the publisher was right. Perhaps the book would have sold well with a blood-soaked adolescent revenge fantasy ending. But sales aren't everything."

== Awards ==
Bruce Bethke won the Philip K. Dick Award in 2012 for SF original paperback published in the US.

- 1995: Headcrash (Grand Central Publishing) - Winner.

== Anthology ==
Bethke is currently creator and Editor in Chief of the monthly anthology series "Stupefying Stories" which he began publishing in 2012.
