= Cyberpunk (short story) =

1983 short story and novel by Bruce Bethke

- Short story by Bruce Bethke
- Country: United States
- Language: English
- Genre: Science fiction

Publication
- Published in: Amazing Stories
- Publication type: Periodical
- Media type: Print (magazine, hardback & paperback)
- Publication date: 1983

"Cyberpunk" is a 1983 science fiction short story by Bruce Bethke, published in Amazing Stories. Bethke subsequently expanded the story into a novel and made it available online in 2001. The story is most famous for coining the term "cyberpunk", which came to be used to describe the science fiction subgenre featuring rebellious use of technology.

== History ==
In the spring of 1980, Bethke was writing a story about children who lived immersed in a truly technological society, with their own culture, disparate from mainstream society as it appeared at that time. He describes the process as:

How did I actually create the word? The way any new word comes into being, I guess: through synthesis. I took a handful of roots—cyber, techno, et al—mixed them up with a bunch of terms for socially misdirected youth, and tried out the various combinations until one just plain sounded right.

The story was printed three years later in the science fiction magazine Amazing Stories. After William Gibson's novel Neuromancer was released a year later, the term "cyberpunk" came into widespread use as the name of the science fiction subgenre.

== Plot summary ==
Through heavy use of the literary technique of indirect exposition, the reader learns that the character Mikey is a proficient and troublemaking computer virtuoso, essentially a hacker, though this term is not used in the story. He hangs out with friends who cause trouble online, encounters interference from his parents, and uses his skills to circumvent their will.

== Novel ==
Cyberpunk was originally written as a series of short stories in the 1980s. Bethke says "After I sold the original story in '82, I continued to work on the story cycle, publishing bits and pieces here and there throughout the 1980s. In '89 I pulled the major chunks together into the rough form of a novel, and to my surprise and delight I sold it, to a publisher who later regained his sanity and decided not to release it". This novel was purchased by a publisher via an exclusive contract that forbade Bethke to sell the novel to another publisher. However, the publisher decided not to release the novel, causing several years of legal battles over the rights to the book. Bethke has a downloadable version of the novel available for five dollars (as shareware) on Scribd.

When asked, during a 2005 interview, by Lynne Jamneck in Strange Horizons, for the reason his publisher purchased the book but never printed it, Bethke replied that it was because he had refused to change the ending:

What the publisher wanted me to write was a "Frazetta cover" ending; you know, the hero, center stage, with a mighty weapon in his hands, a cowering half-naked babe at his feet, and the blood-smeared corpses of his many enemies piled high all around.

Bethke said that he refused because this end scene would have taken place in a school. He concluded that the book might indeed have sold better that way, but "sales aren't everything".
