= William Gibson bibliography =

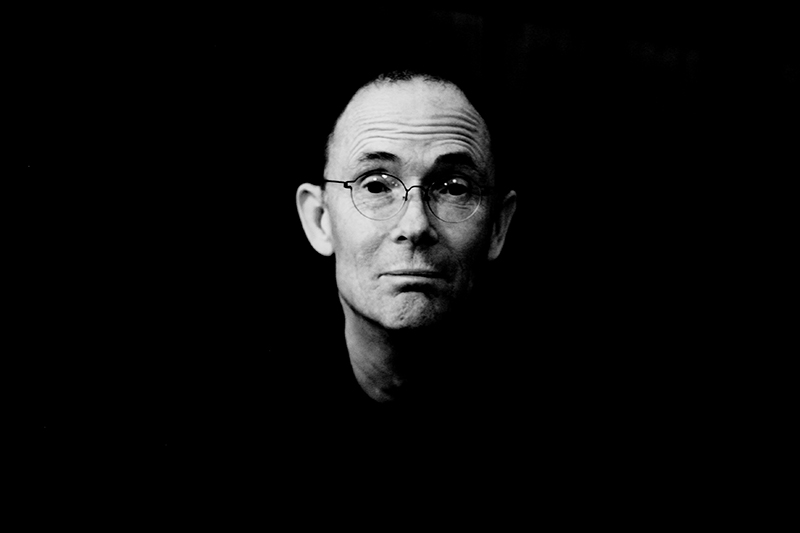
- William Gibson in 2007
- Novels↙: 12
- Articles↙: 25
- Stories↙: 21
- Collections↙: 1
- Scripts↙: 6
- Screen appearances↙: 13
- Forewords, introductions and afterwords↙: 16
- Miscellanea↙: 9

The works of William Gibson encompass literature, journalism, acting, recitation, and performance art. Primarily renowned as a novelist and short fiction writer in the cyberpunk milieu, Gibson invented the metaphor of cyberspace in "Burning Chrome" (1982) and emerged from obscurity in 1984 with the publication of his debut novel Neuromancer. Gibson's early short fiction is recognized as cyberpunk's finest work, effectively renovating the science fiction genre which had been hitherto considered widely insignificant.

At the turn of the 1990s, after the completion of his Sprawl trilogy of novels, Gibson contributed the text to a number of performance art pieces and exhibitions, as well as writing lyrics for musicians Yellow Magic Orchestra and Debbie Harry. He wrote the critically acclaimed artist's book Agrippa (a book of the dead) in 1992 before co-authoring The Difference Engine, an alternate history novel that would become a central work of the steampunk genre. He then spent an unfruitful period as a Hollywood screenwriter, with few of his projects seeing the light of day and those that did being critically unsuccessful.

Although he had largely abandoned short fiction by the mid-1990s, Gibson returned to writing novels, completing his second trilogy, the Bridge trilogy at the close of the millennium. After writing two episodes of the television series The X-Files around this time, Gibson was featured as the subject of a documentary film, No Maps for These Territories, in 2000. Gibson has been invited to address the National Academy of Sciences (1993) and the Directors Guild of America (2003) and has had a plethora of articles published in outlets such as Wired, Rolling Stone and The New York Times. His third trilogy of novels, Pattern Recognition (2003), Spook Country (2007) and Zero History (2010) have put Gibson's work onto mainstream bestseller lists for the first time.

== Novels ==
- Sprawl trilogy:
  1. Neuromancer (1984)
  2. Count Zero (1986)
  3. Mona Lisa Overdrive (1988)
- The Difference Engine (1990; with Bruce Sterling)
- Bridge trilogy:
  1. Virtual Light (1993)
  2. Idoru (1996)
  3. All Tomorrow's Parties (1999)

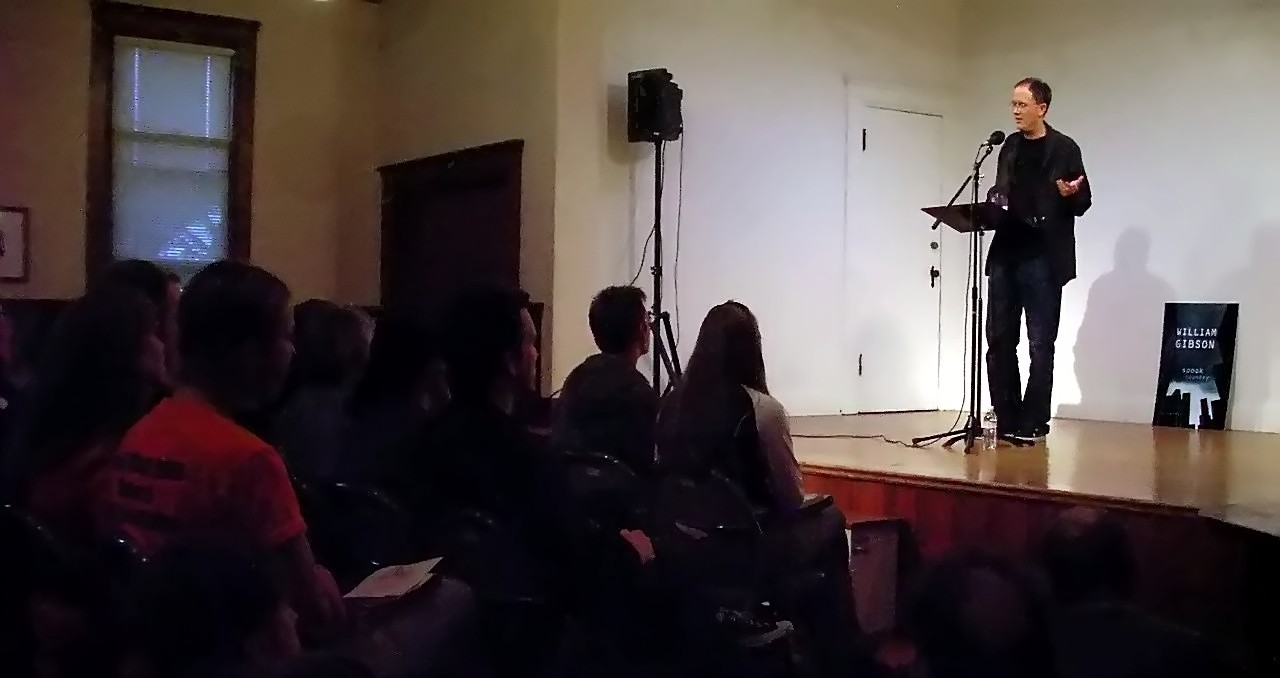
Gibson discussing Spook Country (2007) on August 8, 2007, while touring in support of the novel.

- Blue Ant trilogy:
  1. Pattern Recognition (2003)
  2. Spook Country (2007)
  3. Zero History (2010)
- Jackpot trilogy:
  1. The Peripheral (2014)
  2. Agency (2020)
  3. Jackpot (TBD)

== Short fiction ==
=== Collected ===
- "Burning Chrome" (1986, preface by Bruce Sterling):
  - "Johnny Mnemonic" (May 1981, Omni)
  - "The Gernsback Continuum" (1981, Universe 11)
  - "Fragments of a Hologram Rose" (Summer 1977, UnEarth 3)
  - "The Belonging Kind", with John Shirley (1981, Shadows 4)
  - "Hinterlands" (October 1981, Omni)
  - "Red Star, Winter Orbit", with Bruce Sterling (July 1983, Omni)
  - "New Rose Hotel" (July 1984, Omni)
  - "The Winter Market" (November 1985, Vancouver)
  - "Dogfight", with Michael Swanwick (July 1985, Omni)
  - "Burning Chrome" (July 1982, Omni)

=== Uncollected ===
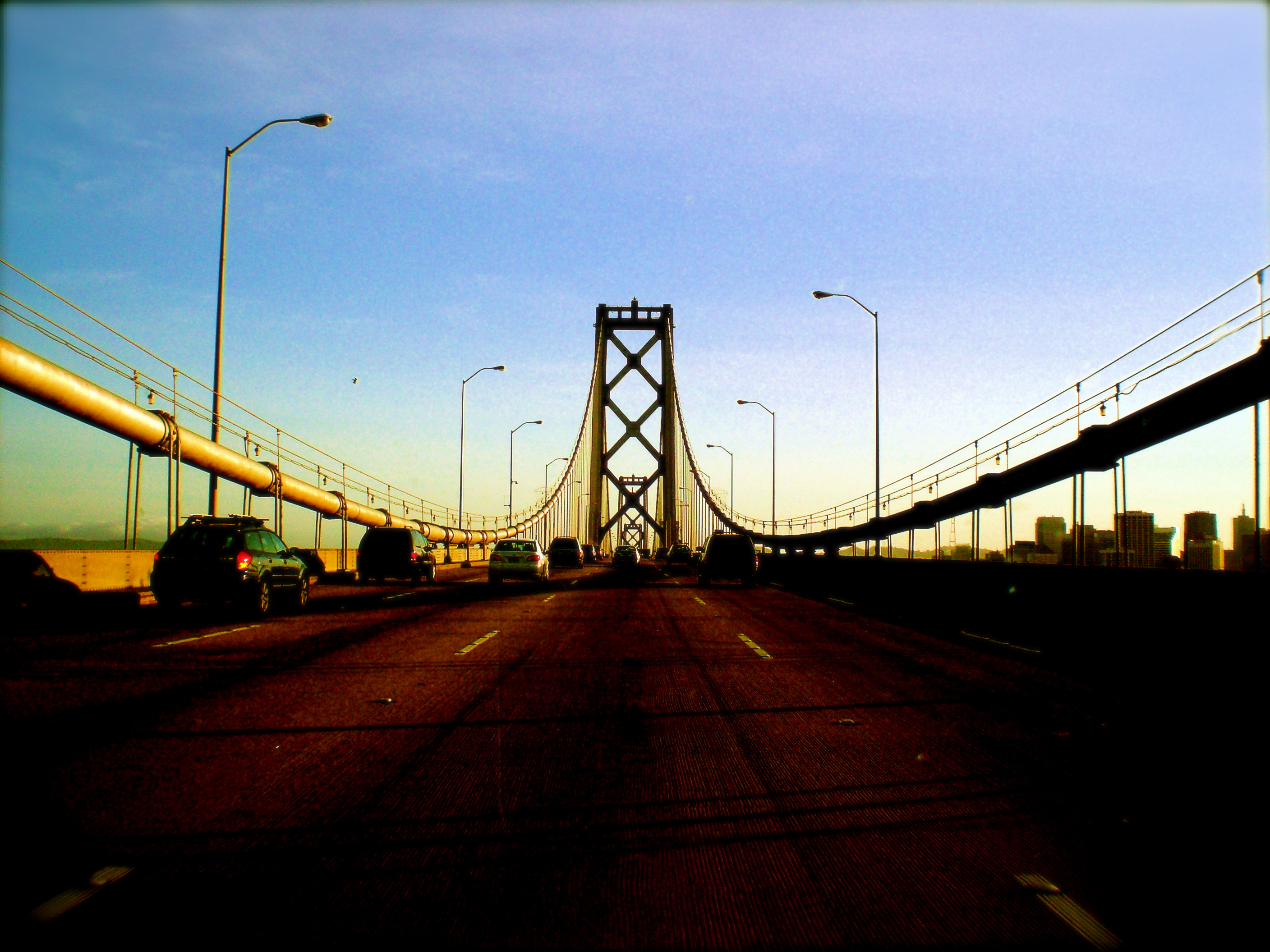
The San Francisco – Oakland Bay Bridge, a fictional squatted version of which formed the setting for Gibson's short story "Skinner's Room" (1990). He would later revisit the setting in his Bridge trilogy of novels.

- "Tokyo Collage" in SF Eye, August 1988.
- "Tokyo Suite" in Penthouse (Japanese edition) 1988/5-7. Early version of “Tokyo Collage”, translated by Hisashi Kuroma.
- "The Smoke" in Mississippi Review 47/48, 1988.
- "Hippy Hat Brain Parasite" in Shiner, Lewis, Modern Stories No. 1, April 1983. Republished in Rucker, Rudy (1989). Semiotext[[E]] Sf. Brooklyn: Autonomedia. pp. 109–122. ISBN 978-0-936756-43-1.
- "The Nazi Lawn Dwarf Murders" (unpublished)
- "Doing Television" in Dorsey, Candas Jane (1990). Tesseracts 3. Victoria: Porcépic. pp. 392–394. ISBN 978-0-88878-290-8. OCLC 24504625.
- "Darwin" (a slightly longer version of "Doing Television") in The Face, March 1990, and Spin, April 1990, 21–23.
- "Skinner's Room" in Polledri, Paolo (1990). Visionary San Francisco. Munich: Prestal. pp. 153–65. ISBN 978-3-7913-1060-2. Republished in McCaffery, Larry (1995). After Yesterday's Crash. New York: Penguin Books. ISBN 978-0-14-024085-6.
- "Academy Leader" in Benedikt, Michael (1991). Cyberspace. Cambridge: MIT Press. pp. 27–29. ISBN 978-0-262-52177-2.
- "Cyber-Claus" in The Washington Post Book World, 1991-12-01. Republished in Hartwell, David (1992). Christmas Stars. New York: Tor Books. ISBN 978-0-8125-2286-0.
- "Where the Holograms Go" in Trilling, Roger (1993). Wild Palms Reader. St Martins Pr. pp. 122–23. ISBN 978-0-312-09083-8.
- "Thirteen Views of a Cardboard City" in Garnett, David (1997). New Worlds. Clarkston: White Wolf Pub. pp. 338–349. ISBN 978-1-56504-190-5. Republished in Kelly, James (2007). Rewired: The Post-Cyberpunk Anthology. San Francisco: Tachyon Publications. ISBN 978-1-892391-53-7.
- "Dougal Discarnate" in Gartner, Zsuzsi, ed. (2010). Darwin's Bastards. Vancouver: Douglas & McIntyre. ISBN 978-1-55365-492-6. OCLC 436620011.

=== Excerpted ===
- Mona Lisa Overdrive:
  - "The Silver Walks" in High Times, November 1987
  - "Kumi in the Smoke" ("Kemuri no naka no Kumi") in the Japanese magazine Hanatsubaki, issue 453, March 1988. Translated by Hisashi Kuroma.
- The Difference Engine (with Bruce Sterling):
  - "The Angel of Goliad" in Interzone issue 40, 1990
- Idoru:
  - "Lo Rez Skyline" in Rolling Stone issue 735, May 30, 1996
- The Peripheral:
  - "Death Cookie / Easy Ice" in Sterling, Bruce (2014). Twelve Tomorrows. Technology Review, Inc.

== Screenplays ==
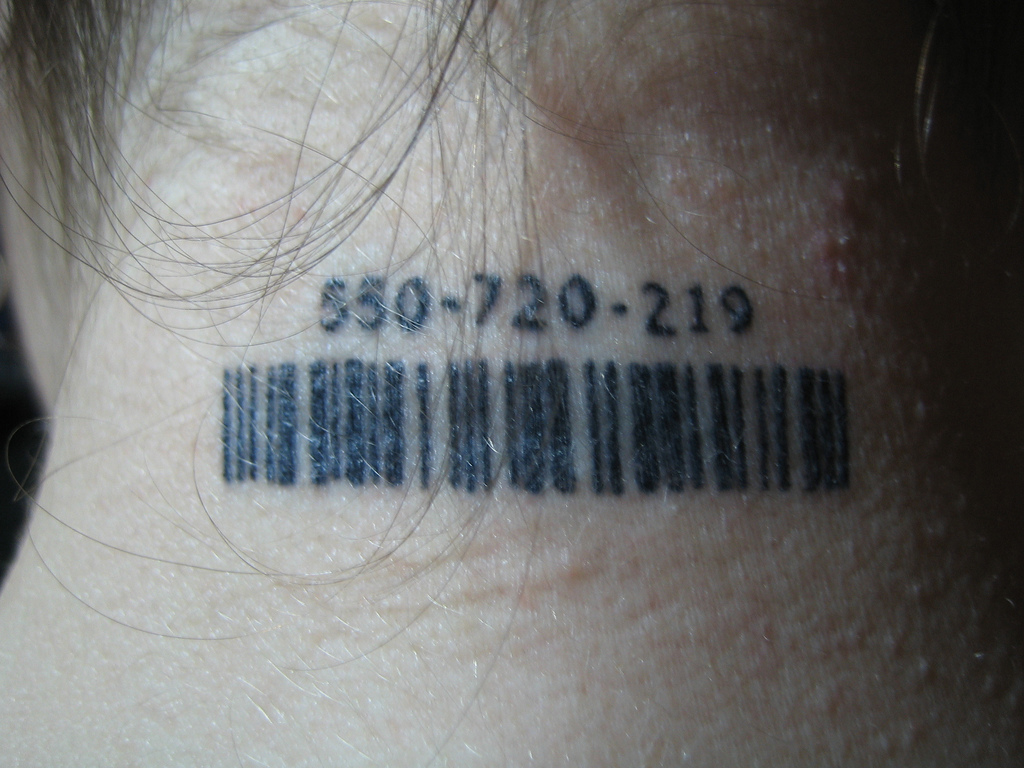
A neck barcode tattoo, the sole element of Gibson's Alien 3 script which was included in the final cut of the film.

- Johnny Mnemonic (1995)
- The X-Files:
  - "Kill Switch" (1998; with Tom Maddox)
  - "First Person Shooter" (2000; with Tom Maddox)

=== Unrealized ===
- Burning Chrome – adaptation of "Burning Chrome" (1982)
- Neuro-Hotel
- Alien 3 (late 1980s)

== Comics ==
- William Gibson Archangel (2016) – 5-part comic with Michael St. John Smith and Butch Guice.
- William Gibson's Alien 3 (2019) – 5-part comic with Johnnie Christmas and Tamra Bonvillain.

== Non-fiction ==
- Distrust That Particular Flavor (2012)

=== Articles ===
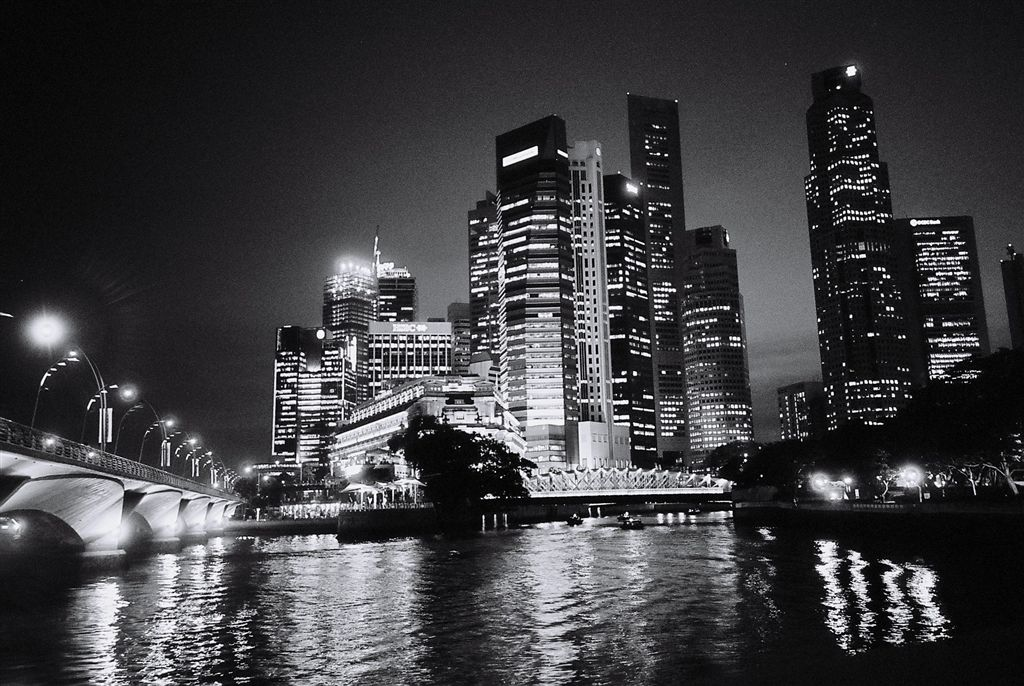
Nightscape of Singapore, which Gibson characterized as "Disneyland with the death penalty" in a Wired article of the same name.

- "Alfred Bester, SF and Me", Frontier crossings : A souvenir of the 45th World Science Fiction Convention, Conspiracy '87, Robert Jackson ed., (1987) OCLC 78913436
- "Rocket Radio " (1989), Rolling Stone, June 15, 1989
- "Disneyland with the Death Penalty" (1993), Wired, 1.04
- "Remembering Johnny: Notes on a Process" (1995), Wired, 3.06, June 1995.
- Gibson, William (July 14, 1996). "The Net Is a Waste of Time...and That's Exactly What's Right About It". The New York Times Magazine. p. 31.
- "'Virtual Lit': A Discussion" (1996) Biblion: The Bulletin of the New York Public Library, Fall 1996: 33–51. ISSN 1064-301X OCLC 26244071
- "Jack Womak [sic] and the Horned Heart of Neuropa" (1997) Science Fiction Eye, Fall 1997. ISSN 1071-3018 OCLC 22440318
- "Dead Man Sings" (1998) Forbes ASAP, 30 November 1998 supp.: 177. ISSN 1078-9901 OCLC 173437996
- "William Gibson's fiction of cyber-eternity may become a reality." (1999) HQ issue 63 : 122, March 1, 1999. ISSN 1321-9820 OCLC 173343432
- Gibson, William (January 1, 1999). "My Obsession". Wired. Vol. 7, no. 1.

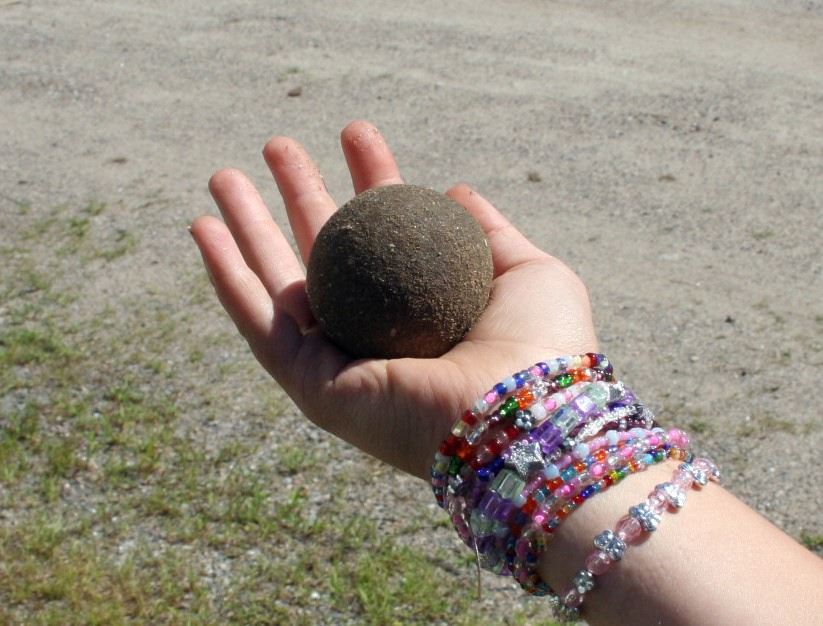
An unshiny amateur example of dorodango, the subject of Gibson's eponymous "Shiny Balls of Mud" article for Tate Magazine in 2002.

- Gibson, William (October 1, 1999). "William Gibson's Filmless Festival". Wired. Vol. 7, no. 10.
- "Steely Dan's Return" (2000) Addicted To Noise Issue 6.03, March 1, 2000
- "Will We Plug Chips Into Our Brains?" (2000) TIME, June 19, 2000.
- "Modern boys and mobile girls" (2001), The Observer, April 1, 2001.
- "Metrophagy" (2001) Whole Earth Catalog, Summer 2001.
- Gibson, William (September 1, 2001). "My Own Private Tokyo". Wired.
- "Blasted Dreams in Mr. Buk's Window" (2001), National Post, 2001-09-20
- "Shiny Balls of Mud" (2002), Tate Magazine, issue 1, September/October 2002. OCLC 33825791 ISSN 1351-3737
- "The Road to Oceania" (2003), The New York Times, 2003-06-25
- "Time Machine Cuba" (2004), Infinite Matrix, August 8, 2004
- Gibson, William (July 1, 2005). "God's Little Toys". Wired. Vol. 13, no. 7.
- Gibson, William (August 1, 2005). "U2's City of Blinding Lights". Wired. Vol. 13, no. 8.
- "Sci-fi special: William Gibson" (2008), New Scientist, issue 2682, November 12, 2008.
- "Google's Earth" (2010), The New York Times, August 31, 2010.
- "25 Years of Digital Vandalism" (2011), The New York Times, January 27, 2011.
- "William Gibson, The Art of Fiction No. 211" (2011), The Paris Review, June 1, 2011.
- "Life in the Meta City" (2011), Scientific American, August 19, 2011.
- "William Gibson on The Stars My Destination" (2012), Library of America, February 23, 2012.
- "1977" (2012), in Punk: An Aesthetic by Johan Kugelberg (editor), reproduced in The Huffington Post, September 19, 2012.
- "We Can't Know What the Future Will Bring" (2012), The Wall Street Journal, October 25, 2012.

=== Forewords, introductions and afterwords ===
- —. Shirley, John (1989). Heatseeker. Santa Cruz: Scream/Press. ISBN 978-0-910489-26-3.
- —. Datlow, Ellen (1990). Alien Sex. New York: Dutton. ISBN 978-0-525-24863-7.
- —. Delany, Samuel R. (1996). Dhalgren. Middletown: Wesleyan University Press. ISBN 978-0-8195-6299-9.
- —. Shirley, John (1996). City Come a-Walkin'. City: Eyeball Books. ISBN 978-0-9642505-1-2.
- —. Kuipers, Dean (2000). Ray Gun: out of Control. London: Booth-Clibborn Editions. ISBN 978-1-86154-040-9.
- —. Sterling, Bruce (1997). The Artificial Kid. Hardwired. ISBN 978-1-888869-16-3.
- —. Davidson, Avram (1998). The Avram Davidson Treasury. New York: Tor. ISBN 978-0-312-86729-4.
- —. Carter, Chris (1998). The Art of the X Files. New York: HarperPrism. ISBN 978-0-06-105037-4.
- —. Wachowski, Lana (2000). The Art of the Matrix. Titan Books. ISBN 978-1-84023-173-1.
- —. Packer, Randall (2001). Multimedia: From Wagner to Virtual Reality. New York: Norton. ISBN 978-0-393-04979-4.
- —. Wachowski, Lana (2002). The Matrix: the Shooting Script. New York: Newmarket Press. ISBN 978-1-55704-490-7.
- —. Turner, Michael (2004). American Whiskey Bar. Arsenal Pulp Press. ISBN 978-1-55152-159-6.
- —. Gunn, Eileen (2004). Stable Strategies and Others. San Francisco: Tachyon Publications. ISBN 978-1-892391-18-6.
- —. Smith, Marquard (2005). Stelarc: The Monograph. Cambridge: MIT Press. ISBN 978-0-262-19518-8.
- —. Borges, Jorge Luis (2007). Labyrinths: Selected Stories & Other Writings. New York: New Directions. ISBN 978-0-8112-1699-9.
- —. Girard, Greg (2007). Phantom Shanghai. Magenta Foundation. ISBN 978-0-9739739-1-4.

== Screen appearances ==
=== Acting appearances ===
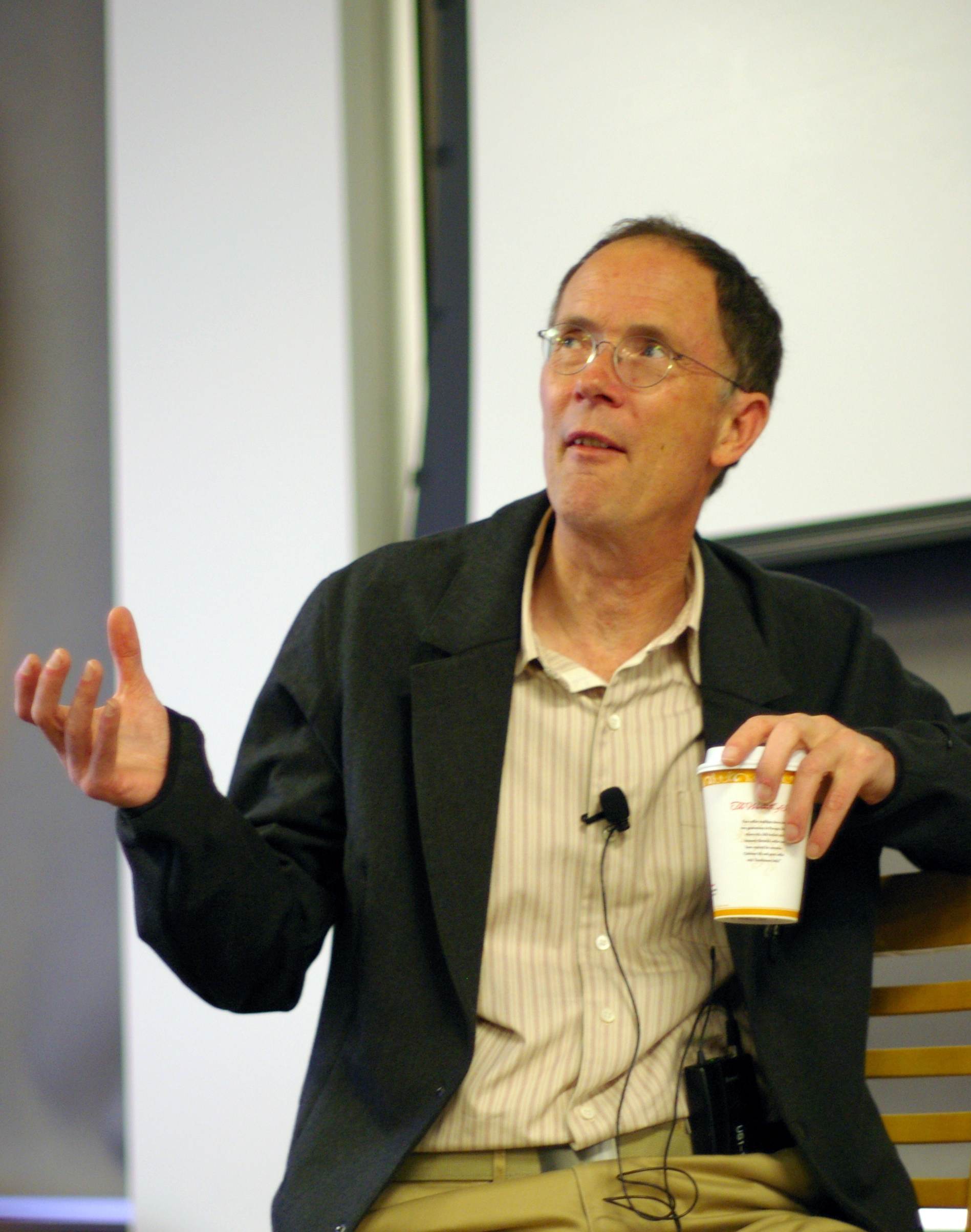
Gibson at an Amazon Fishbowl online talk show in Seattle, Washington, 2007-08-06. Gibson is a frequent guest speaker at conferences and symposia.

- Wild Palms (1993)
- Mon amour mon parapluie (2002)
- "First Person Shooter", The X-Files (2000)

=== Documentaries ===
- Yorkville: Hippie haven – Hippie Society: The Youth Rebellion (1967)
- Cyberpunk (1990)
- No Maps for These Territories (2000)
- Cyberman (2001)

=== Television appearances ===
- Brave New Worlds: The Science Fiction Phenomenon (1993)
- Making of Johnny Mnemonic (1995)
- The X-Files Movie Special (1998)
- "The Screen Savers", February 5, 2003. (2003)
- Bestseller samtalen (2003)
- Webnation, episode 1.14. (2007)

== Miscellanea ==
- Count Zero shortened and bowdlerised serialization illustrated by J. K. Potter, Isaac Asimov's Science Fiction Magazine, January, February, March 1986 issues
- "Robert Longo" (1992), ArtRandom No. 71, ISBN 978-4-7636-8531-5. OCLC 25843406
- Agrippa (a book of the dead) (1992)—an artist's book. OCLC 79137074
- Lyrics, vocals. Technodon, Yellow Magic Orchestra. (1993)
- Lyrics. "Dog Star Girl", Debravation. Deborah Harry. (1993)
- "Speeches on Networking and the Future", joint address with Bruce Sterling to the United States National Academy of Sciences Convocation on Technology and Education on May 10, 1993.
- Narration of Neuromancer for Time Warner Audio Books on 4 audio cassettes (1994)
- Johnny Mnemonic: the Screenplay and the Story. New York: Ace Books. 1995. ISBN 978-0-441-00234-4.
- "Up the Line", address to the Directors Guild of America's Digital Day, Los Angeles, May 17, 2003.
