= List of awards and nominations received by William Gibson =

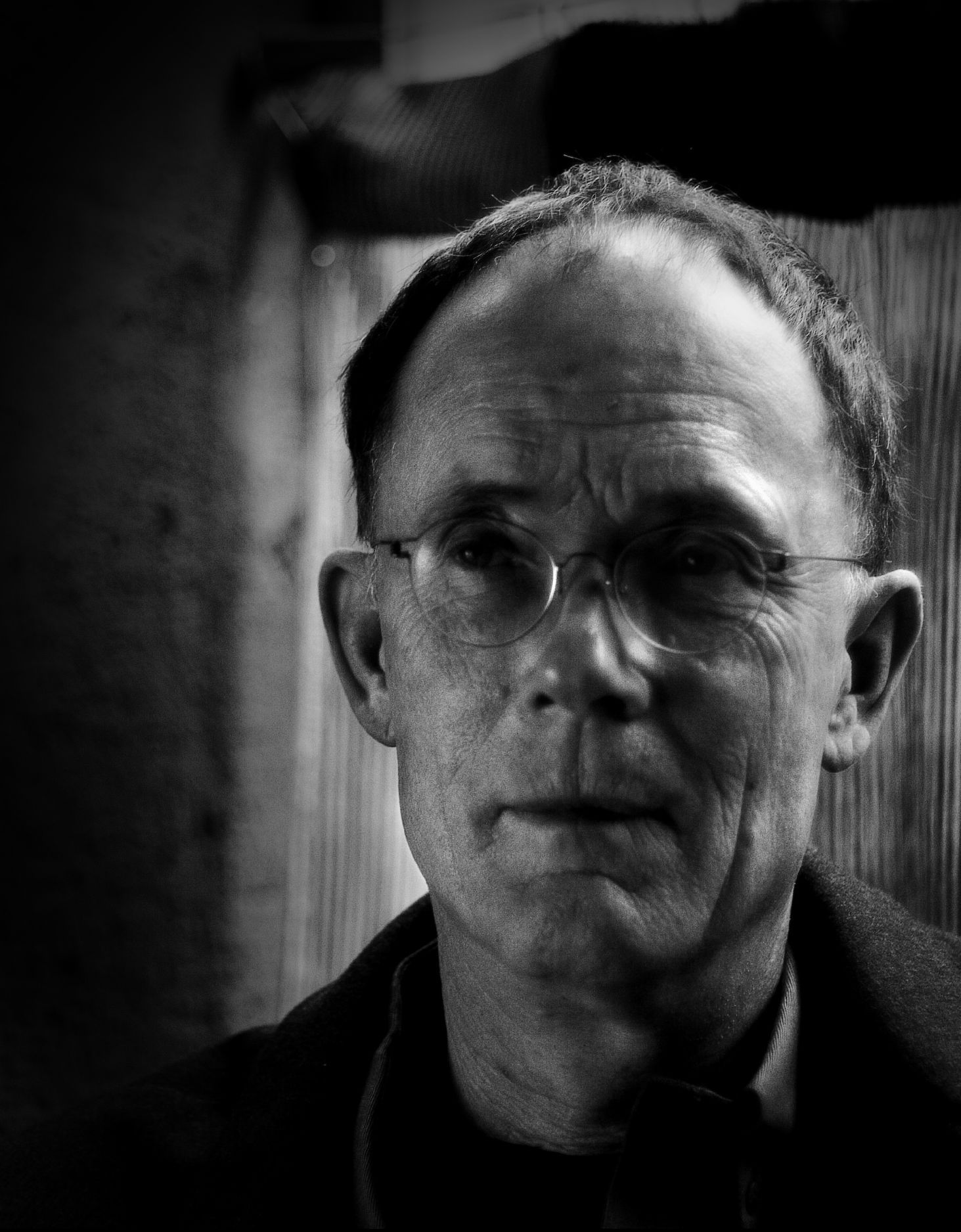
Portrait of Gibson in Paris on the occasion of his 60th birthday, March 17, 2008

William Gibson is an American-Canadian writer who has been called the "noir prophet" of the cyberpunk subgenre of science fiction. Since first being published in the late 1970s, Gibson has written more than twenty short stories and nine critically acclaimed novels. His early works are bleak, noir near-future stories about the relationship between humans and technology – a "combination of lowlife and high tech". Several of these garnered critical attention and popular acclaim, receiving Hugo and Nebula Awards nominations in the categories of best short story and best novelette and being featured prominently in the annual Locus Awards reader's poll.

The themes, settings and characters developed in these stories culminated in his first novel, Neuromancer (1984), which proved to be the author's breakout work, achieving critical and commercial success and virtually initiating the cyberpunk literary genre. It became the first novel to win the "triple crown" of science fiction awards – the Nebula and the Hugo Awards for best novel along with the Philip K. Dick Award for paperback original, an unprecedented achievement described by the Mail & Guardian as "the sci-fi writer's version of winning the Goncourt, Booker and Pulitzer prizes in the same year". It also won the Ditmar and Seiun awards, received nominations for the year's "outstanding work" Prix Aurora Award and the British Science Fiction Association (BSFA) award for best novel, topped the annual Science Fiction Chronicle poll and finishing third in the standings for the 1985 John W. Campbell Award.

Much of Gibson's reputation remained associated with Neuromancer, and though its sequels in the Sprawl trilogy – Count Zero (1986) and Mona Lisa Overdrive (1988) – also attracted Hugo and Nebula nominations for best novel, major award wins eluded the writer thereafter. "The Winter Market", a short story first published in November 1985, was well-received, garnering Hugo, Nebula, Aurora, and BSFA nominations and finished highly in the Locus, Interzone and Science Fiction Chronicle polls. Having completed the cyberpunk Sprawl trilogy, Gibson became a central figure in the steampunk subgenre by co-authoring the 1990 alternate history novel The Difference Engine, which was nominated for the Nebula, Campbell, Aurora and BSFA awards and featured in the Locus poll. His most recent novels – Pattern Recognition (2003) and Spook Country (2007) – put his work onto mainstream bestseller lists for the first time, and the former was the first of Gibson's novels to be shortlisted for the Arthur C. Clarke Award. Gibson was inducted into the Science Fiction Hall of Fame in 2008.

== Awards ==
=== Hugo Award ===
The Hugo Awards are given every year for the best science fiction or fantasy works and achievements of the previous year. The nominees and winners are chosen by members of the annual Worldcon convention. Gibson has won one award, the Hugo Award for Best Novel for his Neuromancer in 1985, and has been nominated on five other occasions.

Year	Nominated work	Category	Result	Notes
1985	Neuromancer	Hugo Award for Best Novel	Won	—
1986	"Dogfight"	Hugo Award for Best Novelette	Nominated	Co-authored with Michael Swanwick
1987	"The Winter Market"	Hugo Award for Best Novelette	Nominated	—
1987	Count Zero	Hugo Award for Best Novel	Nominated	—
1989	Mona Lisa Overdrive	Hugo Award for Best Novel	Nominated	—
1994	Virtual Light	Hugo Award for Best Novel	Nominated	—

=== Nebula Award ===
The Nebula Award is an award given each year to the best science fiction or fantasy fiction published in the United States during the two previous years. It is awarded by the Science Fiction and Fantasy Writers of America, whose members determine the nominations and winners. Gibson's only Nebula Award was for Neuromancer in 1985, though he has received seven other nominations.

Year	Nominated work	Category	Result	Notes
1982	"Johnny Mnemonic"	Nebula Award for Best Short Story	Nominated	Originally published in 1981
1983	"Burning Chrome"	Nebula Award for Best Novelette	Nominated	Originally published in 1982
1985	Neuromancer	Nebula Award for Best Novel	Won	Originally published in 1984
1987	"The Winter Market"	Nebula Award for Best Novelette	Nominated	Originally published in 1985
1986	"Dogfight"	Nebula Award for Best Novelette	Nominated	Co-authored with Michael Swanwick; originally published in 1985
1987	Count Zero	Nebula Award for Best Novel	Nominated	Originally published in 1985
1989	Mona Lisa Overdrive	Nebula Award for Best Novel	Nominated	Originally published in 1988
1992	The Difference Engine	Nebula Award for Best Novel	Nominated	Co-authored with Bruce Sterling; originally published in 1990

=== John W. Campbell Memorial Award ===
The John W. Campbell Memorial Award for Best Science Fiction Novel is awarded by a jury to an outstanding novel published during the previous year. Gibson has been nominated twice for the award, but has not won.

Year	Nominated work	Category	Result	Notes
1985	Neuromancer	John W. Campbell Memorial Award for Best Science Fiction Novel	3rd	—
1992	The Difference Engine	John W. Campbell Memorial Award for Best Science Fiction Novel	2nd	Co-authored with Bruce Sterling

=== Philip K. Dick Award ===
The Philip K. Dick Award is awarded annually by a jury of writers and academics to the best original science fiction paperback published in the United States. Neuromancer won the award in 1984, and Gibson sat on the jury of the 1986 award.

=== Arthur C. Clarke Award ===
The Arthur C. Clarke Award is a British award given for the best science fiction novel first published in the United Kingdom during the previous year as determined by a panel of judges from the British Science Fiction Association, the Science Fiction Foundation and a third selected organization. Gibson's Pattern Recognition (2003) was shortlisted for the award in 2004.

=== Prix Aurora Award ===
The Prix Aurora Awards are granted annually by the Canadian SF and Fantasy Association (and chosen by its members) for the best Canadian science fiction and fantasy. Gibson won the best Long-form English work award twice, and received four other nominations.

Year	Nominated work	Category	Result	Notes
1985	Neuromancer	Outstanding work	Nominated	—
1986	"The Winter Market"	Short-form, English	Nominated	—
1989	Mona Lisa Overdrive	Long-form, English	Won	—
1992	The Difference Engine	Long-form, English	Nominated	Co-authored with Bruce Sterling
1994	Virtual Light	Long-form, English	Nominated	—
1995	Virtual Light	Long-form, English	Won	—

=== BSFA Awards ===
The British Science Fiction Association (BSFA) annually presents four awards, traditionally on the basis of a vote of its members. Gibson has been nominated for an award on six occasions, but has not won.

Year	Nominated work	Category	Result	Notes
1985	Neuromancer	Novel	Nominated	—
1987	"The Winter Market"	Short story	Nominated	—
1987	Count Zero	Novel	Nominated	—
1991	The Difference Engine	Novel	Nominated	Co-authored with Bruce Sterling
2004	Pattern Recognition	Novel	Nominated	—
2007	Spook Country	Novel	Nominated	—

=== Ditmar Award ===
The Ditmar Award is granted by the members of the annual Australian National Science Fiction Convention (the "Natcon") to recognize achievement in Australian science fiction, fantasy and horror and its fandom. Gibson has been nominated for two awards, winning for Neuromancer in 1985.

Year	Nominated work	Category	Result	Notes
1985	Neuromancer	International novel	Won	—
1989	Mona Lisa Overdrive	International novel	Nominated	—

=== Seiun Award ===
The Seiun Award is awarded for the best science fiction published in Japan during the preceding year, as decided by a vote of attendees of the Japan Science Fiction Convention. Gibson won once, for Neuromancer in 1987, and received a second nomination for All Tomorrow's Parties in 2001.

Year	Nominated work	Category	Result	Notes
1987	Neuromancer	Best Foreign Language Novel of the Year	Won	—
2001	All Tomorrow's Parties	Best Foreign Language Novel of the Year	Nominated	—

=== Italia Awards ===
Conferred by vote at the annual Italcon, the Italia Awards have been granted since 1972. Gibson's Virtual Light was nominated in the inaugural "International novel" category in 1995, finishing second.

=== Southeastern SF Awards ===
The Southeastern SF Awards recognizing achievements in fantasy, horror and science fiction by authors connected to the Southeastern United States, were granted from 2002 to 2006 by a vote of members. Gibson, a native of South Carolina who grew up in Virginia, was recognized in 2004, when Pattern Recognition was shortlisted for the Southeastern SF Achievement Award.

=== EFF Pioneer Awards ===
The EFF Pioneer Awards recognize leaders on the electronic frontier who are extending freedom and innovation in the realm of information technology. This was awarded to Gibson in September 2019.

== Polls ==
=== Locus ===
The Locus Awards are presented to winners of Locus magazine's annual reader's poll. For each category of award, readers submit five nominations in order of preference, with the leading work declared the winner. As such, the number of nominated works per category varies from year to year. Though none of Gibson's works have claimed first position, they have polled twenty-four times.

Year	Nominated work	Category	Result	Notes
1981	"The Gernsback Continuum"	Short story	24th	—
1982	"Hinterlands"	Short story	21st	—
1982	"Johnny Mnemonic"	Novelette	20th	—
1983	"Burning Chrome"	Novelette	7th	—
1984	"Red Star, Winter Orbit"	Novelette	19th	Co-authored with Bruce Sterling
1985	Neuromancer	Locus Award for Best First Novel	2nd	—
1985	Neuromancer	Locus Award for Best Science Fiction Novel	8th	—
1985	"New Rose Hotel"	Short story	19th	—
1985	"Dogfight"	Short novelette	5th	Co-authored with Michael Swanwick
1987	Burning Chrome	Collection	2nd	—
1987	Count Zero	Locus Award for Best Science Fiction Novel	3rd	—
1987	"The Winter Market"	Novelette	4th	—
1989	Mona Lisa Overdrive	Novel	2nd	—
1991	The Difference Engine	Locus Award for Best Science Fiction Novel	8th	Co-authored with Bruce Sterling
1992	"Skinner's Room"	Short story	15th	—
1992	The Difference Engine	Locus Award for Best Science Fiction Novel	20th	Co-authored with Bruce Sterling
1994	Virtual Light	Locus Award for Best Science Fiction Novel	4th	—
1997	Idoru	Locus Award for Best Science Fiction Novel	6th	—
1998	Neuromancer	All-time science fiction novel (before 1990)	15th	—
1999	"Burning Chrome"	All-time novelette	13th (tie)	—
1999	Burning Chrome	All-time collection	18th (tie)	—
2000	All Tomorrow's Parties	Locus Award for Best Science Fiction Novel	15th	—
2004	Pattern Recognition	Locus Award for Best Science Fiction Novel	2nd	—
2008	Spook Country	Locus Award for Best Science Fiction Novel	2nd	—
2015	The Peripheral	Locus Award for Best Science Fiction Novel	4th	—
2021	Agency (novel)	Locus Award for Best Science Fiction Novel	5th	—

=== Interzone ===
The annual Interzone Poll is conducted by readers of the British science fiction magazine Interzone. Gibson's short story "The Winter Market" polled third in the fiction category in 1987.

=== Science Fiction Chronicle ===
The semiprozine Science Fiction Chronicle of Andrew I. Porter conducted a reader's poll from 1982 to 1998. Gibson claimed first place once, for Neuromancer in 1985, and finished in the top three on four other occasions.

Year	Nominated work	Category	Result	Notes
1983	"Burning Chrome"	Novelette	3rd	—
1985	Neuromancer	Novel	1st	—
1986	"Dogfight"	Novelette	2nd	Co-authored with Michael Swanwick
1987	"The Winter Market"	Novelette	2nd (tie)	—
1987	Count Zero	Novel	2nd	—

== Career honours ==
In addition to the recognition of his individual works, Gibson has been accorded several career honours. In a 1989 Interzone poll to determine the All-time best SF author, Gibson finished 19th, while in the Locus All-Time Poll taken a decade later, he was tied at 42nd for the All time short fiction writer. He received nominations for a Life achievement Southeastern SF Achievement Award in 2005 and 2006, and was inducted into the Science Fiction Hall of Fame in 2008. In October 2014, Gibson was inducted into the Canadian Science Fiction and Fantasy Association (CSFFA) Hall of Fame. In January 2019, he was named the 35th Damon Knight Grand Master by The Science Fiction and Fantasy Writers of America (SFWA, Inc.) for his contributions to the literature of Science Fiction and Fantasy recognizing his “lifetime achievement in science fiction and/or fantasy.”

== Related pages ==
- List of works by William Gibson
