= Archangel (Gibson comic) =

2016–17 graphic novel

William Gibson Archangel
- Cover of the first issue of Archangel.

Publication information
- Publisher: IDW Publishing
- Schedule: Monthly
- Format: Limited series
- Publication date: May 2016 – August 2017; October 2017 (HC)
- No. of issues: 5
- Main characters: Naomi Givens; Vince Mathews; The Pilot; Junior Henderson

Creative team
- Created by: William Gibson; Michael St. John Smith
- Written by: William Gibson
- Artist: Butch Guice
- Inker: Tom Palmer
- Letterer: Shawn Lee
- Colorist: Diego Rodriguez

Collected editions
- Hardcover: ISBN 978-1631408755

Archangel, also written as William Gibson Archangel or William Gibson's Archangel, is a five-issue limited series comic book that was created by William Gibson and Michael St. John Smith, written by William Gibson, illustrated by Butch Guice and story-edited by Michael Benedetto. It is Gibson's first comic book series, which is set in an alternative version of 2016 in which the Vice President of America travels back in time to 1945 to secure power.

IDW Publishing first released Archangel from May 2016 to August 2017, then in October as a hardcover graphic novel. It was nominated for an Eisner Award for Best Limited Series and was adapted into an audio play that was released by Audible.

== Synopsis ==
In a devastated alternative version of 2016, US Vice President Junior Henderson uses a device called the Splitter to travel back in time with six commandos to 1945 Allied-occupied Berlin. They kill Henderson's grandfather, an Office of Strategic Services major, and Junior takes his place. In 2016, another faction led by Major Torres seizes control of the Splitter and sends a stealth plane to stop Henderson but it crashes with The Pilot parachuting into US-occupied territory. Royal Air Force officer Naomi Givens, who had been investigating foo fighters, agrees to share information with her ex-boyfriend Vince Matthews, a US Intelligence officer who has custody of The Pilot. Henderson arrives to take command but The Pilot escapes using a stealth suit sent by Torres. To complete his mission, The Pilot allies with Givens—who, based on her observations, accepts him as a time traveller—and Matthews, who is skeptical but realizes Henderson is a dangerous imposter.

The Pilot predicts the bombing of Hiroshima and reveals Henderson's plan to use the second atomic bomb to attack the Port of Arkhangelsk, Soviet Union, destroying half of the Soviet fleet, and killing Joseph Stalin and most of the Soviet chain-of-command, allowing the United States to rule the world unchallenged. With the aid of Soviet Colonel Yermakov, they locate Henderson's B-29 in flight and Torres teleports them aboard the aircraft, where they defeat Henderson and his commandos. In 2016, US government forces breach the Splitter's bunker and overpower Torres. Physicist Jack Davis, the inventor of the Splitter who until then had expressed doubts about the wisdom of Torres's plan, activates the Splitter. The armed nuclear bomb detonates at a temporary White House located outside the Splitter facility. Givens and Matthews are returned to Berlin as news of the nuclear attack on Nagasaki is received in a restored timeline. The Pilot arrives in a peaceful 2016 Berlin, having thwarted one megalomaniac US president only to be confronted by a newspaper headline describing the possibility of another.

== Characters ==
=== 1945 ===
- Naomi Givens: An RAF Intelligence Officer, a materials scientist, and one of the main protagonists of the story.
- Vince Mathews: A US Intelligence Officer, who is Naomi's ex-boyfriend, and one of the main protagonists of the story.
- Fritz: Naomi's driver and black market expert.
- Herr Säugling (Mr Baby): Owner of the last surviving night club in Berlin.
- Yermakov: A Ukrainian colonel in Soviet intelligence

=== 2016 ===
- The Pilot: A tattooed Marine sent back to 1945, and one of the main protagonists of the story.
- Junior Henderson: The US vice president, who goes back in time to make sure his powerbase in entrenched in the past. His father is the US President for life.
- Major Guadalupe Torres: A scientist who is in control of the Splitter.
- Jack Davis: A physicist who created the Splitter; a detainee and eventual ally of Torres.

== Writing and development ==
Archangel's co-creator and writer William Gibson was inspired by supernatural and conspiracy stories surrounding World War II, which he called "the Weird War", and drew upon his own Cold War nuclear anxiety.

Gibson, and writer and actor Michael St. John Smith, first pitched the idea for Archangel to a German television company, which declined it. Gibson and St. John Smith then developed the idea into a screenplay and a computer game. When IDW Publishing approached Gibson about adapting a novel, he immediately proposed developing Archangel into a comic book. The IDW team included artist Butch Guice, and the comic book includes inking by Tom Palmer, colors by Diego Rodriguez, and letters by Shawn Lee.

The comic book's main setting in Berlin is a holdover from the project's original pitch for German television. Gibson stated that the story became "leaner" and "more linear" in comics form. According to Gibson's afterword in the hardcover edition, the story was continually revised due to contemporaneous events. The final frames give the ending a context the creators "could [not] have possibly imagined when we began work on our first issue".

== Art ==
Butch Guice illustrated Archangel, except for the fifth issue, which was illustrated by Wagner Reis and Tom Palmer. Publishers Weekly noted the art contrasts the bright neon colors of future technology with dark, earthy tones of the 1940s "that evokes wartime cloak-and-dagger exploits". A review in Paste noted the "conscious interplay of shadows and silhouettes" in the composition of frames makes for "a thrilling combination of uncertainty, dynamism and intrigue" that is required of the genre.

== Publication history ==
Archangel was initially published as a five-issue limited edition comic book series, the first issue of which was released on 18 May 2016 and the final issue was released in August 2017. The story was republished as a hardcover graphic novel on 3 October 2017.

== Critical reception ==
Critics gave Archangel a positive reception. Tom Batten of Library Journal described the graphic novel as "thought-provoking, unabashedly political [science fiction]". Joel Cunningham described the graphic novel as a "twisting, complex narrative ... [that is] perfectly suited to the medium".

Writing about the first issue, Toussaint Egan of Paste found it an impressive first comic by Gibson and Smith with strong artwork aiding the establishment of the main characters. Jonathan Gitli of Ars Technica stated Archangel has "hit a chord" and is "thought-provoking science fiction"; Gitli writes positively about the female characters with "strong wills and personalities", and also notes IDW Publishing sold out the initial print run in just a few days. Cory Doctorow reviewed the first issue in Boing Boing and said it "fires on all cylinders" and that the "art and dialog work extra duty to convey a story that is native to the medium". He concludes the comic is "spectacular".

A review in Publishers Weekly stated the graphic novel "mines the rich pseudoscience mythology surrounding World War II, or 'The Weird War'". Laura Hudson of Wired wrote the graphic novel is part of a "long tradition of 'what if' stories about World War II", which examines "the apocalyptic terror of nuclear weaponry" and alludes to repetition of self-destructive human impulses. Jason P. Woodbury of Comic Book Resources gave the series a positive review and said it felt "deliriously contemporary" because it was published during the 2016 United States presidential election and features "power-hungry politicians, complicated conspiracies involving Russia, UK and US agents caught between shifting national allegiances ... pondering the justification of their actions". He took particular note of the Twilight Zone-like ending and asks: "What if the true dystopia is whatever dystopia you happen to inhabit?".

== Awards ==
Archangel was nominated for the 2017 Eisner Award for Best Limited Series.

== Adaptations ==
Archangel was adapted into a full-cast, three-hour radio play that was written by Gibson and Smith, and produced and released by Audible.

On 25 July 2016, at San Diego Comic-Con, William Gibson stated Archangel had been optioned for television and he later confirmed this on Twitter.

== See also ==
- List of works by William Gibson
- William Gibson
