= The Gernsback Continuum =

- Short story by William Gibson
- Country: Canada
- Language: English
- Genres: Science fiction, cyberpunk

Publication
- Published in: Universe 11, Burning Chrome
- Publication type: Anthology
- Media type: Print (hardback and paperback)
- Publication date: 1981

Chronology
Johnny Mnemonic	Hinterlands

"The Gernsback Continuum" is a 1981 science fiction short story by American-Canadian author William Gibson, originally published in the anthology Universe 11 edited by Terry Carr. It was later reprinted twice in 1986, in Gibson's collection Burning Chrome, and in Mirrorshades (the latter edited by Bruce Sterling), and then in the Norton Book of Science Fiction (1993). The story depicts the encounters of an American photographer with the futuristic American architecture of the Art Deco period; when he is assigned to document it for a British publisher, he experiences retro-futuristic hallucinations, which—according to one scholar—reflects the futuristic architecture's connection to fascism. Nader Elhefnawy, writing for Tangent, argues the story bears some similarity to Gibson's later appraisal of Singapore for Wired magazine in Disneyland with the Death Penalty—as much essay as fiction. "Gernsback" in the title alludes to Hugo Gernsback, the pioneer of American pulp magazines from the early 20th century, including Amazing Stories and Science Fiction Plus.

== Plot summary ==
The Gernsback Continuum depicts the encounters of an American photographer with the futuristic American architecture of the Art Deco period. In 1980, he is assigned by London-based publishing house Barris-Watford to document 1930s–1950s architectural achievements. His contacts are Cohen and Dialta Downes, who describes the buildings and designs as, "a kind of alternate America...A 1980 that never happened, an architecture of broken dreams," or what Cohen calls "Raygun Gothic." As he photographs the various buildings for Cohen and Downes, the photographer begins to hallucinate dreamlike designs from that era, including flying cars, giant zeppelins, impossibly wide multi-lane highways and various other fantastic technologies which lead him to question reality as the scenes of the period spill into his own continuum.

The photographer contacts Merv Kihn, a journalist and conspiracy theorist who specializes in paranormal phenomena. Kihn attributes the photographer's visions to what he calls "semiotic ghosts," the remnants of pop culture in the collective unconscious, and advises immersion in a diet of present-day (1980s) decay, such as pornography, violent television programs and depressing newspapers. The photographer is greatly disturbed by these increasing visions, which he disparagingly compares to old Buck Rogers serials, Nazi Germany and Hitler Youth propaganda. The saccharine and squeaky-clean aesthetics of his visions cause him to long for his familiar and preferred postmodern present, filled with pollution, gas shortages and disastrous foreign wars. Things reach a head when the photographer drives to Tucson, Arizona and sees the normally small city as a vast and idealized metropolis, inhabited by physically perfect, blonde-haired, blue-eyed American citizens, whose haughty yet innocent demeanors push him over the edge. He desperately contacts Kihn again who reassures him to continue forcing his mind out of the unpleasant visions by immersing himself in the bleak realities of their own present time.

Having completed the photographs for the job, and overwhelmed by too many similarities between Los Angeles and his hallucinations, Barris-Watford's hired photographer retreats to San Francisco and books a plane to New York, the nightmare visions gradually fading away as he consumes the current disasters of global news. He rushes to a newsstand and buys whatever print he can detailing the familiar horrors of his own timeline. As he leaves, the attendant watching television news tells him that the world scene "could be worse"; the photographer replies, "Or even worse, it could be perfect." The photographer leaves with his magazines.

== Publication history ==
Writing for Tangent Online (in review of Burning Chrome), Nader Elhefnawy describes American-Canadian author William Gibson's "The Gernsback Continuum" as originally being published in 1981, in editor Terry Carr's anthology, Universe 11, and that it was republished in American Heritage's magazine, Invention & Technology, in 1988. In review, Thomas A. Bredehoft recounts that by 1995, it had been anthologised in the collections Burning Chrome, Mirrorshades, and the Norton Book of Science Fiction.

== Critical reception ==
In Nader Elhefnawy's Burning Chrome review, he argues that the story bears some similarity to Gibson's later appraisal of Singapore for Wired magazine in Disneyland with the Death Penalty—as much essay as fiction. Elhefnawy further describes Gibson as disposing of an idealised future perceived in and from the 1930s, Gibson's inherent critique being compared to that of Moorcock and Pynchon:

Continuum is very much about a central tenet of cyberpunk, that this world is one where "the capital F future isn't going to arise," as Gibson later put it... because, here, at least, that vision of the future is insanity. Gibson's treatment of this theme is softer than, for instance, Michael Moorcock's or Thomas Pynchon's, but then his story is firmly set in the southwestern United States in the disenchantment following the oil embargo and Vietnam, rather than Nazi Germany... Twenty-six years later, we still live in a world where a great many pretend to know "nothing of pollution, the finite bounds of fossil fuel" or defeat in foreign wars – which may be another reason to think Michael Moorcock has a point when he says this kind of critique is becoming more rather than less relevant.

Thomas A. Bredehoft, quoting Bruce Sterling's introduction to Burning Chrome, relates what he considers a "bombastic" view, that:

'The Gernsback Continuum' shows [Gibson] consciously drawing a bead on the shambling figure of the SF tradition. It's a devastating refutation of 'scientifiction' in its guise as narrow technolatry.

Bredehoft continues, describing Gibson's treatment of cyberpunk, cyberspace, and the recurrence of agent Kihn in the author's fiction, suggests that the media and dystopian realities in which Kihn urges Gibson's character escape the idealism of his visions are symptomatic and in part caused by the worlds he photographs:

The media are as deeply infused with the "Gernsback Continuum" as the narrator's visions are, because the products of thirties futurism are still with us. In fact, the very pieces of real-life architecture on which the narrator focuses his camera are described in much the same terms as Kihn's "semiotic ghosts".

He goes on to draw parallels between Gibson's descriptions of 1930s futuristic design, the author's encounters with computer technology, and the cosmeticism of a vision of technology infused throughout Gibson's work and particularly in Neuromancer; comparing the language of drug narratives, Gernsback's worlds of the future and cyberspace, he suggests a cyberpunk born of the dual influences of the golden age of the 1930s and 40s and the New Wave, arguing that the futurist utopianism derided in the likes of Gernsback is in fact one feature of a 'Gibsonian' cyberspace itself:

Cobbling these disparate influences together into the construct of cyberspace might be interpreted as a brash act of postmodern bricolage, but interpreters of Gibson's conception of and visualization of cyberspace need to acknowledge both of these very real influences on the structure of cyberspace, idealistic dreams which Gibson himself has treated with, at best, equivocal praise... Cyberspace functions as the embodiment of the past's utopian dreams; entering cyberspace, then, is entering a dream of the past.

Peio Aguirre, writing in the journal Afterall, has compared The Gernsback Continuum to the concept of hauntology by Jacques Derrida.

== Adaptations ==
"The Gernsback Continuum" was adapted during 1993 as Tomorrow Calling, a short TV film by Tim Leandro for Film4 Productions; originally shown on Channel 4, the film was also presented at the British Film Festival, October 4–10, 1996.

== See also ==
- Atompunk
- Dieselpunk
- Futurism
- Hauntology
- Retrofuturism
- Raygun Gothic
- Future Shock
