= Red Star, Winter Orbit =

Short story by William Gibson, Bruce Sterling

- Short story by William Gibson and Bruce Sterling
- Country: Canada
- Language: English
- Genre: Science fiction

Publication
- Published in: Omni, Burning Chrome, Mirrorshades
- Publication type: Anthology
- Media type: Print (hardback and paperback)
- Publication date: July 1983

Chronology
Burning Chrome	The Winter Market

"Red Star, Winter Orbit" is a short story written by William Gibson and Bruce Sterling in the 1980s. It was first published in Omni in July 1983, and later collected in Burning Chrome, a 1986 anthology of Gibson's early short fiction, and in Sterling's 1986 cyberpunk anthology Mirrorshades. The story is set in an alternate future where the Soviet Union controls most of the Earth's resources, especially oil. As a result of this the United States is no longer a dominant economic power on earth and the Soviets have won the space race.

Science fiction critic Takayuki Tatsumi regards the story as a descriptive account of "the failure of the dream of space exploration", reminiscent of J. G. Ballard's "inner space/outer space" motif. Gibson scholar Tatiani Rapatzikou commented that the motif of the space station was used by the authors as a "symbol of the tension and uneasiness the characters or readers experience every time they deal with the artificiality of their technological world".

== Plot summary ==
The story takes place on the Soviet space station Kosmograd ("Cosmic City"), which consists of a number of Salyuts linked together. The station has both civilian and military roles; the military portion is a base for the operation for two large particle beam weapons for shooting down ICBMs. The civilian side, once a hub for space exploration, is now reduced to a maintenance role for the engineers running the station. Most of the story takes place in one of the Salyuts that has been set aside as the "Museum of the Soviet Triumph in Space." Its caretaker is cosmonaut Colonel Yuri Vasilevich Korolev, the first man to visit Mars.

As the story opens, the military role is no longer required now that the United States has lost superpower status and the threat of ICBMs is gone. The government decides to stop crewing the station, but this would involve a loss of face as they would be abandoning their last occupied space presence. At first they plan on blaming the station's shutdown on the civilian crew's black market activities, the minor trafficking in American media. When he hears of the shutdown, Korolev organizes a strike, demanding the charges be dropped. He is ignored, and the station rapidly deteriorates.

On the ground, a purge starts within the space establishment that removes most of the "old guard." The remaining administrators decide to put the station in a decaying orbit, and blame the Kosmograd's demise on Korolev, the strike's leader. After 20 years in space, Korolev can no longer return to Earth and will make a convenient scapegoat.

Korolev instead hatches a plan to use the remaining Soyuz capsules to allow the crew to make their defection to Japan after landing in China. His attempts to interfere with the military side of the station fail and they prepare to fire on the defectors. One of the capsules returns and deliberately crashes into the weapon. The military crew is killed when their portion of the station is ripped open, and Korolev is locked in the civilian side when the doors automatically close. He is left alone in a decaying orbit.

Some time later, Korolev awakens to find one of the hatches being knocked on from the outside. Thinking he is dreaming, he comes to his senses when the hatch is opened and several Americans enter the station. Hearing it had been abandoned, they have decided to leave their squat on a solar-power balloon and take over the station to form a new colony. The story ends with Korolev being asked to give a tour of the station for its new inhabitants.
