= Burning Chrome (short story collection) =

1986 collection of short stories by William Gibson

- Author: William Gibson
- Cover artist: Rich O'Donnell
- Language: English
- Genre: Science fiction
- Publisher: Arbor House
- Publication date: April, 1986
- Publication place: United States
- ISBN: 978-0-06-053982-5

Burning Chrome (1986) is a collection of short stories written by William Gibson. Three of the stories take place in Gibson's Sprawl, a shared setting for most of his early cyberpunk work. Many of the ideas and themes explored in the short stories were later revisited in Gibson's popular Sprawl trilogy.

== Contents ==
Burning Chrome includes:

Title	Co-author	Original publication date	Original publication
"Johnny Mnemonic"		May 1981	Omni
"The Gernsback Continuum"		1981	Universe 11
"Fragments of a Hologram Rose"		1976/1977	Unearth
"The Belonging Kind"	John Shirley	1981	Shadows 4
"Hinterlands"		October 1981	Omni
"Red Star, Winter Orbit"	Bruce Sterling	July 1983	Omni
"New Rose Hotel"		July 1984	Omni
"The Winter Market"		April 1986	Vancouver Magazine
"Dogfight"	Michael Swanwick	July 1985	Omni
"Burning Chrome"		July 1982	Omni

== Reception ==
Dave Langford reviewed Burning Chrome for White Dwarf #83, and stated that "this was a collection which had to appear—even if three collaborations and an over-arty first published story are needed to fill it out. They're strong, punchy tales which his glittering 'technosleaze' trademark: some are obvious precursors of the novels, and the fine title piece's hair-raising cyberspace jaunt is echoed all too closely in Neuromancer."

J. Michael Caparula reviewed Burning Chrome in Space Gamer/Fantasy Gamer No. 82. Caparula commented that "This is vital reading; harsh, gritty, complex, visionary."
