= The Belonging Kind =

- Short story by William Gibson and John Shirley
- Country: Canada
- Language: English
- Genre: Science fiction

Publication
- Published in: Shadows 4, Burning Chrome
- Publication type: Anthology
- Media type: Print
- Publication date: 1981

Chronology
New Rose Hotel	Burning Chrome

"The Belonging Kind" is a science fiction short story by cyberpunk authors William Gibson and John Shirley. It was first published in the horror anthology Shadows 4 edited by Charles L. Grant in 1981, later to be included along with several other stories in Gibson's collection Burning Chrome.

It was written prior to the conception of the Sprawl universe in which several of Gibson's novels and stories are set, taking place in a setting much more like contemporary American life.

== Plot summary ==
Michael Coretti is a dull, scholarly man who studies and teaches linguistics and social interaction theory. He frequently visits bars to help alleviate the tedium of his everyday life, even though he never feels at ease among the crowds. One night, he meets a woman named Antoinette who seems to fit in perfectly, adapting her speech patterns to match any conversation partner.

Coretti follows Antoinette to various other bars and clubs, watching as she drinks and talks with a male companion; her appearance and clothing shift to let her fit in wherever she goes. He begins to spend more of his nights searching for her in one bar after another, and his teaching deteriorates to the point that he loses his job.

When Coretti sees Antoinette's companion pay a cabdriver with money formed from a pocket within his body, he realizes that the two are not human. He follows them to a room in the hotel where he has been staying, but flees in horror upon finding a crowd of creatures just like them, who can live solely on alcohol and change their appearance and behavior to blend in at any bar they enter. He takes a night job and finds lodgings at a boarding house, but after three weeks he receives a telephone call inviting him to join "the belonging kind." Abandoning the job and his room, he discovers that he has taken on their non-human characteristics and settles in at a bar for an evening of secret mating with Antoinette.
