= Dogfight (short story) =

- Short story by Michael Swanwick and William Gibson
- Language: English
- Genre: Cyberpunk

Publication
- Published in: Omni
- Publication date: July 1985

Chronology
The Winter Market	—

"Dogfight" is a science fiction short story by American writers Michael Swanwick and William Gibson, first published in Omni in July 1985. The story was also included in Gibson's 1986 short story collection Burning Chrome.

== Plot ==
Deke, a serial shoplifter, has been punished for his crimes by having a neural block installed that forces him to leave his hometown of Washington, D.C., and never return. Traveling south by bus, he has a brief stopover in Virginia and encounters Tiny Montgomery, a crippled military veteran who is the local champion of the video game Spads & Fokkers. Players use hardware connected directly to their brains to control World War I-era airplanes in a holographically projected dogfight.

Deciding to stay in the area, Deke steals a copy of the game and the equipment needed to play it and rents a room at a nearby apartment hotel. He meets Nance Bettendorf, a college student studying brain-computer interfaces, and starts a relationship with her in order to secure her help in upgrading his equipment. They cannot touch, however, as Nance's parents have safeguarded her virginity by installing a neural block to prevent her from having physical contact with anyone.

As Deke gains experience with the game, he learns from Bobby Earl Cline, an associate of Tiny's, that Tiny was continually given a drug called "hype" during his military service as a fighter pilot. The drug improves users' concentration and reaction time, but overuse results in permanently sped-up reflexes. The local players regard Tiny as unbeatable due to his past use of hype and all the time he spends playing, but Deke becomes determined to unseat him.

Deke plays his way up through the ranks of the locals and eventually earns the right to play against Tiny. He takes advantage of Nance's neural block to coerce her into giving him a dose of hype she has obtained, then breaks off their relationship. The hype allows Deke to defeat Tiny after a prolonged dogfight and claim both his medal and a large payoff. He soon finds himself without anyone to help celebrate his victory, though, as the upset has left Tiny humiliated and the locals wanting nothing to do with Deke.
