= Hinterlands (short story) =

- Short story by William Gibson
- Country: Canada
- Language: English
- Genre: Science fiction

Publication
- Published in: Omni (October 1981), Burning Chrome (1986)
- Publication date: October 1981

Chronology
The Gernsback Continuum	New Rose Hotel

"Hinterlands" is a science fiction short story written by William Gibson. It was first published in Omni in October 1981 and was republished in his short fiction collection Burning Chrome (1986). The story is a fable about the "cargo cult" mentality and explores the consequences for cultures and civilisations when confronted with artifacts - from an unknown but likely superior source - that are dangerous but nonetheless valuable.

"Hinterlands" is a German term that literally translates to "behind land", and in that original context it refers to a remote or less developed area behind a more central or developed site, for example the land behind a coast, a harbour, or a city.

== Plot summary ==
The story is told by the narrator, Toby Halpert, through a series of expositions detailing the history of the space station in which he lives, nicknamed Heaven.

The history begins with Soviet cosmonaut Olga Tovyevsky, who disappears from radar while en route to Mars shortly after a routine scientific experiment. She returns into space-time two years later, and after being discovered her spacecraft is towed back to Earth orbit to be examined. Tovyevsky is in a catatonic state, and the spacecraft has been sabotaged in an attempt to make it impossible to find and to hide any details of the missing two years. In her hands Tovyevsky has a seashell, the likes of which is unknown in Earth's biosphere. Tovyevsky never regains her sanity and later dies.

The Russians send another probe to the same space coordinates Tovyevsky had travelled to. The solo cosmonaut also disappears, at precisely the same point, after performing the same experiment, and returns dead 234 days later. He has committed suicide before anyone can reach him. Further attempts always end the same way; most of the cosmonauts have killed themselves before they can be found, while a very few have attempted to and failed, and are now insane. Attempts to send through uncrewed spacecraft all fail, as well, and some crewed spacecraft are simply never picked up for reasons unknown.

Presently, the Russians enlist other countries in their search for answers. The process continues and interest wanes as the smartest minds humanity has to offer are destroyed.

Everything changes when a Frenchman returns dead, carrying an iron ring encoded with information that proves to be the "Rosetta Stone for cancer". From that point on the astonishing frequency of the events creates a cargo cult mentality, with line-ups of prospective astronauts ready to take the trip regardless of its inescapable end in death or insanity. The coordinates are the same each time, and referred to as the Highway, Metro, or River by various cultures.

In an effort to learn more, a space station is established near the Highway, designed to be paradise and positioned to pick up returning ships. Some 20% of the astronauts are found dead on arrival, while another 70% have suffered irreversible mental damage and are sent to the station's long-term care facility. The remaining 10% are taken into Heaven in an effort to keep them alive as long as possible and tease out any information they can provide before they eventually kill themselves. Halpert is one of the astronauts who had volunteered to go to the Highway, but he was rejected by whatever is out there. The same fate befell his girlfriend Charmian, who holds the record for keeping one survivor alive for two weeks. Halpert and Charmian's role is to meet returning astronauts, soothe their transition to the station, and allow scientists to analyze their findings.

What information is returned shows that the technologies on the other side of the Highway are different, but not necessarily more advanced. None of what comes back could possibly explain how the Highway works, and it is assumed the same is true for the other races the astronauts apparently meet on the "other side". Halpert likens it to houseflies meeting in an international airport, happy to converse but utterly unaware of where they are or how they got there.

The story is being told as Halpert is being readied to meet a returning female astronaut who is still alive – a "meat shot". While racing to meet the spacecraft, Halpert suffers a massive bout of agoraphobia, called "The Fear", a Lovecraftian sensation of being overwhelmed by the Highway's significance. Forced by electric shocks to enter the capsule, he finds the astronaut recently dead and discovers that she has reprogrammed her robotic surgeon suite to dissect her arm and thus assist her suicide. Diagrams for incredibly powerful molecular switches are scrawled on the walls.

== Language ==
"Hinterlands" makes extensive use of metaphors. For instance, the story's wormhole is referred to as "The Highway". From this metaphor, Gibson creates several other metaphors. The Highway's travelers are referred to as "hitchhikers", "flies", and "hicks". These words have a figurative rather than a literal meaning.

The story's title is also a metaphor, comparing the known space to a backwoods area that is far from civilization. The destination at the end of the wormhole is figuratively "the big city".

== Film and TV adaptation ==
In 2016, Last Studio Standing Inc., a Vancouver, Canada-based animation studio, acquired the rights to "Hinterlands" and announced that they would be creating both a theatrical short film and a television series set to be released in 2018. The project was later abandoned, with no media other than concept art released.

== Comic book adaptation ==
Vancouver artist Gavin Lonergan adapted and illustrated "Hinterlands" as a comic book, published in 1995. The 20-page comic book was anthologised in two sections which appeared in Freeflight #5 and #6, Dec/Jan 95 and Apr/May 95. The look of the comic book is similar to Moebius, and Gibson was directly involved in the adaptation process. The William Gibson aleph has called the comic an "interesting evocation of the fake paradise of the short story".
