= Fragments of a Hologram Rose =

- Short story by William Gibson
- Cover of a French collection of Gibson's short stories, with "Fragments" as the title story
- Country: Canada
- Language: English
- Genre: Science fiction

Publication
- Published in: Unearth
- Publication type: Periodical
- Media type: Print (magazine)
- Publication date: 1977

Chronology
| — | Johnny Mnemonic |

"Fragments of a Hologram Rose" is a science fiction short story by William Gibson. It was Gibson's first published work, originally appearing in Unearth magazine #3 (June 21, 1977), a short-lived science fiction collection magazine that retailed for $1.00; Gibson was paid $23 for the story. It tells the story of a jilted ex-lover who relies on artificial sense recordings to sleep in a dark, polluted city. It was subsequently published in Burning Chrome, a collection of Gibson's early short fiction.
