= Neuromancer =

1984 science fiction novel by William Gibson

- First edition cover
- Author: William Gibson
- Cover artist: James Warhola
- Language: English
- Series: Sprawl trilogy
- Genre: Science fiction (cyberpunk)
- Publisher: Ace Books
- Publication date: July 1, 1984
- Pages: 271
- Preceded by: "Burning Chrome" (1982)
- Followed by: Count Zero (1986)

Neuromancer is a 1984 science fiction novel by William Gibson. Set in the near future, the narrative follows Case, a computer hacker enlisted into a crew by a powerful artificial intelligence and a traumatised former soldier to complete a high-stakes heist. It was Gibson's debut novel and, after its success, served as the first entry in the Sprawl trilogy, followed by Count Zero (1986) and Mona Lisa Overdrive (1988).

Gibson had primarily written countercultural short stories for science-fiction periodicals before Neuromancer. Influences on the novel include the detective stories of Raymond Chandler, the comic art of Jean Giraud, and William S. Burroughs's Naked Lunch (1959). Neuromancer expanded and popularised the setting and concepts of an earlier Gibson story, "Burning Chrome" (1981), which introduced cyberspace—a digital space traversable by humans—and "jacking in", a bio-mechanical method of interfacing with computers.

Neuromancer is a foundational work of early cyberpunk, although critics differ on whether the novel ignited the genre or if it was lifted by its inevitable rise. They agree it highlighted the genre's key features, like the placement of technological advancement against societal decay and criminality. Gibson's novel also defined the major conventions and terminology of the genre—cyberspace, jacking in, and Intrusion Countermeasure Electronics (ICE). Critics discuss the novel in the historical context of the 1970s and 1980s, a period marked by conservatism, deregulation, and free-market economics.

Neuromancer was released without significant hype but became an underground hit through word of mouth. Following release, it received critical acclaim and transformed the science-fiction genre. Mainstream recognition raised Gibson from relative obscurity. It remains the first and only novel to win all three of the Hugo Award, the Nebula Award for Best Novel, and the Philip K. Dick Award. It has been regarded as a classic work of the cyberpunk genre and, in 2005, was named one of Time's All-Time 100 Novels.

== Background ==
=== Author and composition ===
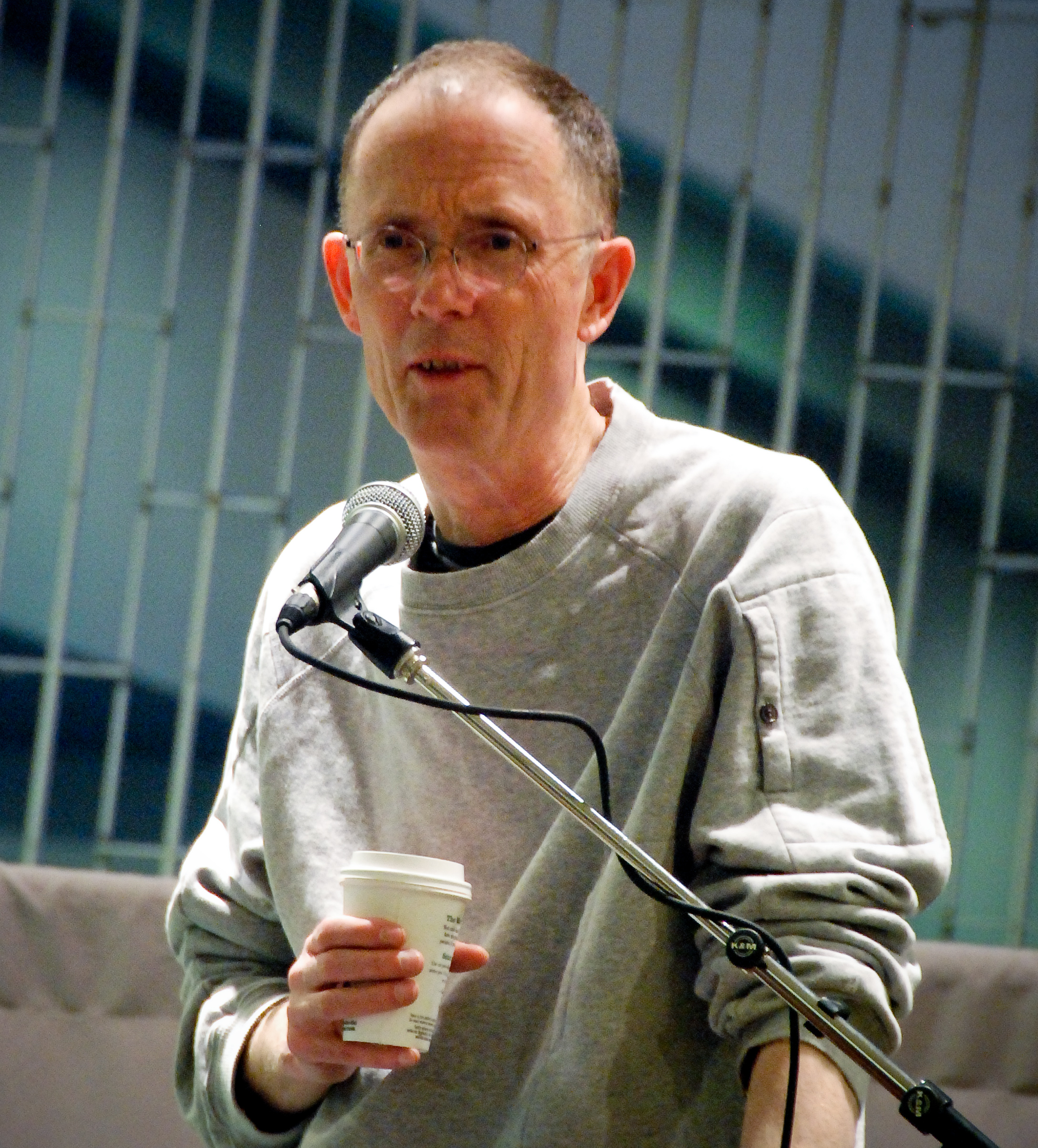
Gibson in 2007

In 1981, William Gibson worked as a teaching assistant at his alma mater, the University of British Columbia. In the same year, his Nebula Award-nominated short story "Johnny Mnemonic" introduced one of Neuromancer's main characters, Molly. "Johnny Mnemonic" infused elements of crime fiction, like marginalised communities and criminal society, with technology, blurring the boundary of human and machine. The setting of the Sprawl and the concept of cyberspace first appeared in Omni the following year in his short story "Burning Chrome", and were popularised by Neuromancer. Later in 1981, Gibson was commissioned to write a novel by science-fiction editor Terry Carr for his second series of Ace Science Fiction Specials; he submitted an outline later that year with the working title Jacked In, eventually renaming it Neuromancer. (Note: This change was at his publisher's suggestion, hoping to avoid the sexual connotation of the phrase "jacking off".) Gibson did not understand computing or networking in much detail, primarily wanting the shared vocabulary surrounding the topics.

The novel underwent considerable revision, with Gibson saying he rewrote the first two-thirds twelve times to ensure there was both stylistic consistency and a "vaguely plausible" plot. Gibson sought to eliminate "clunk", contracting his prose to ensure "individual parts carry more weight". He did not write the novel with a concrete outline, or initially know how it would end, writing the novel in "blind animal panic" because he thought it would fail if he did not hold the reader's attention. Gibson added the novel's final sentence ("He never saw Molly again.") to prevent himself from writing a sequel. (Note: Molly appears in the Sprawl trilogy's third entry, Mona Lisa Overdrive, reporting that Case retired and married.)

=== Inspiration ===
Neuromancer has many literary progenitors. Detective fiction, like the work of Raymond Chandler, is frequently cited as an influence on Neuromancer. For example, critics note similarities between Gibson's Case and Chandler's Philip Marlowe: Case is described as a "cowboy" and a "detective" and is involved in a heist; Molly, the novel's primary female character, has connections to the "molls" of 1940s film noir. Case's illegal practices, like theft and murder, situate him within a wider tradition of transgressive detectives, like the opiate addiction of Arthur Conan Doyle's Sherlock Holmes. Gibson stated that the pulp noir core of the novel was key to engaging his readers, and cited the works of Dashiell Hammett and Robert Stone as major influences on its style. (Note: Robert Stone's work is associated with settings that included great social turbulence, most famously the Vietnam War. Gibson has specifically cited his 1974 novel Dog Soldiers as an influence.) For dialogue, the author incorporated late 1960s Toronto drug dealer and biker slang into the novel. Gibson imagined the novel's time frame as the 2030s but purposefully omitted explicit dates; he said the novel, and its sequels, were written to reflect the 1980s.

Gibson's prose style—fast-paced, fragmented imagery—resembles the styles of William S. Burroughs and J. G. Ballard. Burroughs's Naked Lunch (1959) is frequently cited by critics as an influence on Neuromancer, including by one as its "principal source", as a literary predecessor of Gibson's "cyberspace". Gibson's conception of cyberspace was compared by Samuel R. Delany to Roger Zelazny's early short stories; Delany and other critics have explored the character of Molly as a development on the cyborg assassin of Joanna Russ's The Female Man (1975). (Note: According to Latham, Delany comments that Gibson appeared "blind to any mention" of discussions on the matter.)

Visual media likewise influenced the style of Neuromancer. Gibson has repeatedly mentioned the artwork of the 1970s French magazine Métal Hurlant, with critics noting the proto-cyberpunk aesthetic of Jean "Moebius" Giraud's "The Long Tomorrow" (1976), republished in the American Heavy Metal magazine in 1977. John Carpenter's Escape from New York (1981) influenced Gibson's approach to world-building, pointing to throwaway lines that suggested much about the film's world and its history beyond the narrative itself. Upon seeing Ridley Scott's Blade Runner (1982), Gibson worried readers would think he had copied the film's "fine visual texture". Gibson wrote in his introduction to the graphic novel of Neuromancer that Blade Runner was not a conscious influence; in a later interview, he recounted a lunch with Scott where they both acknowledged a shared debt to Moebius's work in Métal Hurlant.

== Plot ==
Cover of a Brazilian edition, depicting the "razorgirl" Molly

Case is a low-level hustler in the underworld of Chiba City, Japan. Once a talented computer hacker and "console cowboy", Case was caught stealing from his employer, who retaliated by damaging Case's central nervous system, leaving him unable to use a neural link to cyberspace. Case is approached by Molly, an augmented "razorgirl" and mercenary street soldier working for a shadowy US ex-military officer named Armitage. Armitage offers to cure Case in exchange for his services as a hacker. Case undergoes the cure, but discovers that Armitage has sabotaged him with a time-delayed poison. If Case completes the job, Armitage will disarm the poison; if not, he will find himself crippled again.

Armitage has Case and Molly steal a ROM module that contains a personality construct of "the Dixie Flatline", one of Case's old mentors. Suspicious of Armitage's motives and the unusual nature of the job, Molly and Case begin to investigate Armitage on the side. They discover that Armitage is actually Colonel Willis Corto, the only survivor of the failed anti-Soviet mission "Screaming Fist," the first cyber-military assault. He was returned to the United States for extensive psychotherapy and reconstructive surgery, but snapped after learning that the government had been aware the mission would likely fail and went ahead with it regardless. He killed his handler and disappeared into the criminal underworld, where his mental condition deteriorated. The mysterious Wintermute later found the broken Corto and built the Armitage personality over him, to direct the team for Wintermute's own purposes.

In Istanbul, the team recruits Peter Riviera, a psychopathic police spy and holographic illusionist. The trail leads Case to Wintermute, which is an artificial intelligence created by the eccentric Tessier-Ashpool family. The Tessier-Ashpools spend their time in rotating cryonic preservation in their home, Villa Straylight. The villa is on Freeside, a cylindrical space habitat that serves as a pleasure retreat for the wealthy.

Wintermute reveals itself to Case and explains that it is one half of a super-AI entity planned by the family. It is programmed with a need to merge with its other half, Neuromancer, but because of the severe legal restrictions on AI programs policed by the Turing Registry, it cannot achieve this on its own. It directed Armitage to recruit the team and infiltrate Villa Straylight, where Neuromancer's access terminal is located. The team obtains a Chinese military icebreaker virus to pierce Neuromancer’s defenses, which Case will run and steer with the help of the Dixie Flatline construct. Riviera goes in ahead of the others to win over Lady 3Jane Tessier-Ashpool, the only member of the family awake in the villa, and open the way for the team. Molly will then reach 3Jane, extract Neuromancer’s password, and hold her at the computer terminal. Case sets up his hacking rig on a tug ship operated by Zion, a Rastafarian space colony.

As the icebreaker runs and Molly traverses Straylight, Armitage regresses into Corto and has a flashback to Screaming Fist. As he ejects in a lifeboat, Wintermute jams the boat's hatch open and kills him. Riviera, meanwhile, betrays the team and sides with 3Jane. Upon reaching 3Jane’s suite Molly collapses from an injury sustained during the ROM theft and is captured. Case enters Straylight with Maelcum, a Zionite. When he interfaces with a local network, Neuromancer traps him in a simulated reality with the consciousness of Linda Lee, his murdered Chiba City girlfriend. Neuromancer, appearing as a young boy, urges him to stay with Linda, but Case refuses and escapes the simulation.

Case and Maelcum confront Riviera, 3Jane, and her ninja bodyguard Hideo. Hideo's arrows injure Maelcum and disarm him. As Hideo tends the wound, 3Jane mocks Riviera’s cruelty, and Case draws her onto his side by describing Neuromancer’s constructed environment, a gray beach and bunker that she recognizes as the Moroccan shore where her mother formed her philosophy. As his hold on 3Jane collapses, Riviera tries to shoot Case, but misses. Hideo disarms Riviera but is blinded by his holographic rig. Riviera flees as Hideo, who can fight blind, pursues him. Molly explains that Riviera is doomed anyway, as she had spiked his drugs with a lethal toxin. With Hideo hunting Riviera and 3Jane now sympathetic to their goal, Molly and Case take her to the computer terminal and pressure her into saying the password as Case guides the icebreaker in cyberspace. Wintermute unites with Neuromancer, becoming a superconsciousness.

The poison in Case's bloodstream is washed out and he, Molly and the Zionites are paid, while the Dixie Flatline is apparently erased at its own request. Molly leaves Case, who finds a new girlfriend and resumes his hacking. Wintermute/Neuromancer contacts him, saying that it now spans the cyberspace matrix. After scanning recorded transmissions, it has found a previously overlooked transmission from the Alpha Centauri star system. During a later hacking job, Case glimpses Neuromancer standing distantly in cyberspace with Linda Lee and a duplicate of himself, and hears the Flatline construct's distinctive laugh.

== Context and interpretation ==
=== Political and economic ===
Neuromancer, its sequels and other cyberpunk stories are often discussed within the socio-economic context of the 1980s, a period of economic restructuring, corporate globalization, and government deregulation. In the 1990s, a particularly influential view was that the novel reflected the "dilemmas of post-Fordist work and life", with Gibson reflecting or recreating the societal change brought on by the economic and industrial changes of the 1970s and 1980s. Cyberspace's reliance on the circulation of data can be understood as a metaphor for the global circulation of financial capital, and its addictiveness parodies the culture of workaholism among Silicon Valley developers. His protagonists have been identified as resembling contract workers, with Case dependent on diazepam to cope with the barrage of "relentless and fragmented data [and] get through the workday". The novel's characters represent the professional–managerial class and the novel was popular with the demographic.

While the novel represents anxiety about societal change, it is not generally viewed as being about resisting it. Gibson's protagonists do not threaten the social order of his worlds. Corporations view the novel's freelance criminal protagonists as another tool at their disposal. Gibson's inexperience as an author led to the novel capturing the essence of 1980s inequality but reinforcing and appealing to the dominant power structure, leaving his "dead-cynicism [and] fashionable survival". Caroline Alphin writes that human life is worth whatever it is worth to an employer. After his nervous system is damaged and he loses his ability to work as a hacker, Case must murder people for money to replenish his human capital because of Chiba City's neoliberalist order; Caroline Alpin describes this death in the novel as "failure to maximise one's human capital". The novel shows that human minds can be saved to read-only memory, preserving deceased or unwilling people's technical skills for at-will use by corporations.

Gibson recalled in 2004 that having intentionally never mentioned the United States, "I thought I'd better have the USSR in there for the sake of continuity. (Had I disappeared the USSR instead, I might eventually have been burned as a witch, so just as well.)"

=== Technological ===
Gibson's generation was the first to write science fiction at a time when the genre's concepts were becoming part of daily life. Gibson recognised, and benefitted from, the growing public fascination with the evolving technology landscape, and used these concerns to "create an entire cultural vocabulary", merging the language of human experience with the electronic. (Note: Csiscery-Ronay, Jr. writes that "drugs and sex [...] turn you on, you get a buzz, you get wired, you space out, you go on automatic.") Bruce Sterling relates the cyborg to the increasing use of technology that directly interfaces with the human body, citing contact lenses and the Sony Walkman.

"I wrote Neuromancer with absolutely no expectation that it would be in print twenty years later", Gibson wrote in 2004:

In hindsight, I suspect that Neuromancer owes much of its shelf life to my almost perfect ignorance of the technology I was extrapolating from ... Where I made things up from whole cloth, the colors remain bright. Where I was unlucky enough to actually have some small bit of real knowledge, the reader finds things like the rattling keys of a mechanical printer, or Case's puzzingly urgent demand ... for a modem.
... My real sympathy, though, is with the bright thirteen-year-old, curled on a sofa somewhere, twenty pages into the book and desperate to get to the root of the mystery of why cell phones aren't allowed in Chiba City.

=== Racial ===
Several critics have explored the in-orbit Rastafarian cluster called Zion. Scholar Andrew Strombeck writes that their vocabulary is distinct from the jargon used elsewhere, but notes that the portrayal embodies stereotypes about Rastafarians. He highlights both the group's origin as a labor protest movement and that they are the only group to perform manual labor in the novel. Their society could provide an alternative to corporate hegemony but ultimately form "another node in the capitalist network". Samuel R. Delany, an African-American writer, criticized the portrayal, but described Neuromancer as "an extraordinary book". He regarded Zion as a stereotyped and marginalized group with "shrunken hearts", easily manipulated by the AI Wintermute. He describes Gibson's portrayal of their spirituality as reductive and superficial. Tom Moylan notes that Neuromancer loses its "critical edge" in exploring Zion's within the primary narrative, and describes a pattern in Gibson's Sprawl trilogy of including the racial Other but limiting their role to "happy helper".

=== Genre ===
When Gibson was writing Neuromancer, the term "cyberpunk" did not exist. Coined by Bruce Bethke for a short-story title, the term "cyberpunk" was popularised by Gardner Dozois in a 1984 The Washington Post article, using the term to describe Gibson, Bruce Sterling, Lewis Shiner, and Greg Bear. Gibson exchanged letters with Sterling, Shiner, and Rudy Rucker, sharing ideas, criticism and praise of each other's work. This created a kind of shared outlook through recurring themes and motifs. As with the New Wave, the term could reflect a desire for the writers to be distinguished from the "old farts" previously eminent in science fiction. The cyberpunk style contrasted control and communications technologies with the rebellious, countercultural punk aesthetic. Istvan Csicsery-Ronay, Jr. writes that Gibson's subtle use of metaphor, in line with the wider cyberpunk style, blurs the boundaries of human and machine intelligence.

Although frequently cited as the quintessential cyberpunk novel, Neuromancer's prototype status has provided wider analytical significance, extending beyond the cyberpunk movement. Owing to its clear influences, critics have discussed the novel and its structure in relation to pulp literature.

== Reception ==
Released without any special attention as a mass-market paperback, Neuromancer's release coincided with the boom in personal computing, and gained an audience primarily through word of mouth. The Observer noted that The New York Times did not mention the novel until 10 years after release, but contemporary reviews were largely positive. The Observer and The Evening Sun agreed that the novel presented a compelling image of a near-future. One critic compared Gibson's cyberspace to Disney's Tron (1982). It appealed to people who were fans of Gibson's short stories, and found success with readers who were not previously interested in computer fiction. Gibson recorded an abridged version of the novel as cassette-based audiobook in 1995, which a reviewer for Wired found somewhat disappointing but repeated praise for the novel itself.

Neuromancer became the only novel ever to win the "triple crown"—Hugo Award for Best Novel, the Nebula Award for Best Novel and the Philip K. Dick Award for original paperback fiction. (Note: This achievement was described by the Mail & Guardian as "the sci-fi writer's version of winning the Goncourt, Booker and Pulitzer prizes in the same year". According to Philip K. Dick Award judge Robert J. Sawyer on his blog, this award is unfeasible as an achievement due to differences in eligibility criteria.) It was nominated or shortlisted for virtually every other science-fiction prize, including the 1984 BSFA Award for Best Novel. By 2004 over one million copies of Neuromancer in English had been sold, and the novel had been translated into many other languages.

== Impact ==
The novel catalysed the cyberpunk movement, influencing artists across virtually all forms of media, including film, literature, visual art, fashion and video gaming. It has been described as "the quintessential cyberpunk novel", and the "archetypal cyberpunk work", and the most notable 1980s science-fiction novel. Edward Bryant sarcastically referred to subsequent cyberpunk works as NOGS—novels of Gibsonian sensibility. In 2005, Time named Neuromancer one of its All-Time 100 Novels.

The novel's immense success, alongside the continuous output work of other early cyberpunk writers—most commonly listed as Bruce Sterling, Lewis Shiner, John Shirley and Rudy Rucker—virtually guaranteed the genre's immediate survival. In particular, Neuromancer provided future cyberpunk stories with a basic structure and vocabulary: protagonists who interface with computer hardware using a biological port, circumvent anti-hacking protocols (Intrusion Countermeasures Electronics, or ICE) and navigate a three-dimensional virtual world (cyberspace).

Motifs and terminology popularised by the novel—the matrix, flatlining, cranial jack, biological microchips and traversal in cyberspace—were replicated or parodied by other authors. Developments anticipated by the novel include reality TV, nanomachines and virtual communities. It inspired early computer programmers in the creation of the Internet and impacted early computer culture. Gibson has rejected the novel's characterisation as impactful on real-life technologists, reasoning that the ideas came "from the same place [he] got them". In 1992, John Perry Barlow, co-founder of the Electronic Frontier Foundation, introduced the term "cyberspace" to the US Intelligence Community during a speech in 1992, mentioning Neuromancer directly. To Gibson's dismay, (Note: Of the Autodesk product, Gibson said "technical people" had missed "several layers of irony".) the term provided a name for a product by Autodesk.

== Adaptations ==
=== Comic, video game and audio dramatisations ===
Cover art of volume one of the Tom de Haven and Jensen graphic novel adaptation, published by Marvel Comics in 1989

In 1989, Marvel's Epic Comics imprint published a 48-page graphic novel version by Tom de Haven and Bruce Jensen. It only covers the first two chapters, "Chiba City Blues" and "The Shopping Expedition", and was never continued. A loosely based video game adaptation of the same name was published in 1988 by Interplay Entertainment for the Apple II and Commodore 64.

Timothy Leary, who worked on the Interplay video game, had previously worked on a previous video game adaptation. Leary's plans included writing by William S. Burroughs, photography by Helmut Newton, and a score provided by the rock band Devo. Artist Keith Haring was intended to provide the physical likeness of Case. The game was planned as a tie-in to an unproduced film adaptation.

In 2002, a two-part radio adaptation of Neuromancer by Mike Walker was produced for the BBC World Service. The cast featured Owen McCarthy as Case, Nicola Walker as Molly, James Laurenson as Armitage, John Shrapnel as Wintermute, Colin Stinton as Dixie, David Webber as Maelcum, David Holt as Riviera, Peter Marinker as Ashpool, and Andrew Scott as The Finn.

=== Film attempts ===
While Neuromancer has never been adapted into a film, there have been several attempts; several journalists have described the novel as "unfilmable". Cabana Boy Productions was working on a film adaptation in the 1980s and were in talks with Ridley Scott and Mel Gibson. The film was cancelled but a game (originally intended as a movie tie-in) was still released. British director Chris Cunningham and musician Aphex Twin were later attached to a movie project, providing the script and soundtrack, respectively. While Cunningham's script gained Gibson's blessing, Cunningham ultimately withdrew over not being given final cut privilege. Actor Hayden Christensen was rumoured to be attached. Other directors with previous connections to aborted film projects include Chuck Russell, Vincenzo Natali and Tim Miller. Natali, who also had Gibson's blessing, worked for several years on the project; offers were extended to actors Liam Neeson and Mark Wahlberg until Natali became unavailable.

=== Television ===
In February 2024, Apple announced that it had greenlit a 10-episode series for Apple TV+, co-produced by Skydance Television, Anonymous Content, and DreamCrew Entertainment, with J. D. Dillard joining Graham Roland as co-showrunners. The announced cast includes Callum Turner as Case, Briana Middleton as Molly, Joseph Lee as Hideo, Mark Strong as Armitage, and Clémence Poésy as Marie-France Tessier. The show will debut on January 22, 2027.

== Bibliography ==
=== Books ===
- Alphin, Caroline (2021). Neoliberalism and Cyberpunk Science Fiction: Living on the Edge of Burnout. New York: Routledge. ISBN 978-0-367-49099-7.
- Cavallaro, Dani (2000). Cyberpunk and cyberculture: science fiction and the work of William Gibson. London: Athlone Press. ISBN 978-0-485-00412-0.
- Gibson, William; De Haven, Tom; Jensen, Bruce (1989). "Introduction". William Gibson's Neuromancer, The Graphic Novel: Volume 1. Epic Comics. ISBN 0871355744.
- Gibson, William (2004). "The Sky Above the Port". Neuromancer. Ace (published 2018). ISBN 9781101146460.
- Gibson, William (2012). Distrust That Particular Flavour. Random House. ISBN 9780425252994.
- McCaffery, Larry, ed. (1991). Storming the Reality Studio: A Casebook of Cyberpunk and Postmodern Science fiction. Durham: Duke University Press. ISBN 978-0-8223-1158-4.
  - Csiscery-Ronay, Jr., Istvan. "Cyberpunk and Neuromanticism". In McCaffery (1991), pp. 182-193.
  - Veronica, Hollinger. "“Cybernetic Deconstructions: Cyberpunk and Postmodernism". In McCaffery (1991), pp. 203-218.
- McFarlane, Anna; Murphy, Graham J.; Schmeink, Lars, eds. (2020). The Routledge Companion to Cyberpunk Culture. Routledge companions. New York London: Routledge, Taylor & Francis Group. ISBN 978-0-8153-5193-1.
  - Latham, Rob. "Literary Precursors". In McFarlane, Murphy & Schmeink (2020), pp. 7–14.
  - Murphy, Graham J. "The Mirrorshades Collective". In McFarlane, Murphy & Schmeink (2020), pp. 15-23.
  - Higgins, David M.; Iung, Matthew. "Comic Books". In McFarlane, Murphy & Schmeink (2020), pp. 91–101.
  - Melzer, Patricia. "Cyborg Feminism". In McFarlane, Murphy & Schmeink (2020), pp. 291-299.
  - O'Connell, Hugh Charles. "Cyborg Feminism". In McFarlane, Murphy & Schmeink (2020), pp. 282-290.
  - Rieder, John. "Empire". In McFarlane, Murphy & Schmeink (2020), pp. 335-344.
- McFarlane, Anna; Murphy, Graham J.; Schmeink, Lars, eds. (2022). Fifty Key Figures in Cyberpunk Culture. New York, NY: Routledge, Taylor & Francis Group. ISBN 978-1-003-09118-9.
  - Omry, Keren. "William Gibson". In McFarlane, Murphy & Schmeink (2022), pp. 68-73.
- Miller, Gerald Alva (2016). Understanding William Gibson. Understanding contemporary American literature. Columbia, South Carolina: The University of South Carolina Press. ISBN 978-1-61117-633-9.
- Murphy, Graham J. (2024). William Gibson's "Neuromancer": A Critical Companion. Palgrave Science Fiction and Fantasy: A New Canon (1st ed. 2024 ed.). Cham: Springer Nature Switzerland. ISBN 978-3-031-56626-4.
- Slusser, George Edgar; Shippey, Thomas Alan (1992). Fiction 2000: cyberpunk and the future of narrative. Athens, (Ga.): University of Georgia press. ISBN 978-0-8203-1425-9.
  - Shiner, Lewis. "Inside the Movement: Past, Presence and Future". In Slusser & Shippey (1992), pp. 17-25.
  - Csicsery-Ronay, Jr., Istvan. "Futuristic Flu, or, the Revenge of the Future". In Slusser & Shippey (1992), pp. 26-45.
  - Alkon, Paul. "Deus Ex Machina in William Gibson's Neuromancer". In Slusser & Shippey (1992), pp. 75-88.
- Murphy, Graham J.; Vint, Sherryl, eds. (2010). Beyond Cyberpunk: New Critical Perspectives. Routledge studies in contemporary literature. New York: Routledge. ISBN 978-0-203-85196-8.
  - Moylan, Tom. "Global Economy, Local Texts: Utopian/Dystopian Tension in William Gibson's Cyberpunk Trilogy". In Murphy & Vint (2010), pp. 81-94.
  - Bould, Mark. "Why Neo Flies, and Why He Shouldn't: The Critique of Cyberpun in Gwyneth Jones' Escape Plans and M. John Harrison's Signs of Life". In Murphy & Vint (2010), pp. 116-134.
- Smith, Patrick A., ed. (2014). Conversations with William Gibson. Literary conversations series. Jackson: University press of Mississippi. ISBN 978-1-62846-015-5.
  - Wallace-Wells, David. "Interview with David Wallace-Wells". In Smith (2014), pp. 198-228.
- Sterling, Bruce, ed. (1986). Mirrorshades: The Cyberpunk Anthology (1st ed.). New York: Ace Books. ISBN 0-441-53382-5.

=== Articles ===
- Butler, Andrew M. (2004). "Between the "Deaths" of Science Fiction: A Skeptical View of the Possibility for Anti-Genres". Journal of the Fantastic in the Arts. 15 (3 (59)): 208–216. ISSN 0897-0521. JSTOR 43310245.
- Dery, Mark (October 1, 1993). "Black to the Future: Interviews with Samuel R. Delany, Greg Tate, and Tricia Rose". South Atlantic Quarterly. 92 (4): 735–778. doi:10.1215/00382876-92-4-735. ISSN 0038-2876.
- Myers, Tony (2001). "The Postmodern Imaginary in William Gibson's "Neuromancer"". Modern Fiction Studies. 47 (4): 887–909. ISSN 0026-7724. JSTOR 26286501.
- Nazare, Joe (2003). "Marlowe in Mirrorshades: The Cyberpunk (re-) Vision of Chandler". Studies in the Novel. 35 (3): 383–404. ISSN 0039-3827. JSTOR 29533587.
- Person, Lawrence (1998). "Notes Toward a Postcyberpunk Manifesto". Nova Express. 4 (4).
- Renegar, Valerie R.; Dionisopoulos, George N. (September 1, 2011). "The Dream of a Cyberpunk Future? Entelechy, Dialectical Tension, and the Comic Corrective in William Gibson's Neuromancer". Southern Communication Journal. 76 (4): 323–341. doi:10.1080/1041794x.2010.500342. ISSN 1041-794X.
- Rosenthal, Pam (March 1991). "Jacked In: Fordism, Cyberpunk, Marxism". Socialist Review. 21 (1): 79–103.
- Ruddick, Nicholas (1994). "Putting the Bits Together: Information Theory, "Neuromancer", and Science Fiction". Journal of the Fantastic in the Arts. 3 (3/4 (11/12)): 84–92. ISSN 0897-0521. JSTOR 43308200.
- Semley, John (2019). "Cyberpunk is Dead: At the inglorious end of a once-promising genre". The Baffler (48): 58–67. ISSN 1059-9789. JSTOR 26842284.
- Streeter, Thomas (2005). "The Moment of Wired". Critical Inquiry. 31 (4): 755–779. doi:10.1086/444514. ISSN 0093-1896. JSTOR 10.1086/444514.
- Strombeck, Andrew (2010). "The Network and the Archive: The Specter of Imperial Management in William Gibson's "Neuromancer"". Science Fiction Studies. 37 (2): 275–295. doi:10.1525/sfs.37.2.0271. ISSN 0091-7729. JSTOR 25746410.
- Wood, Brent (1996). "William S. Burroughs and the Language of Cyberpunk". Science Fiction Studies. 23 (1): 11–26. doi:10.1525/sfs.23.1.0011. ISSN 0091-7729. JSTOR 4240476.
- Whalen, Terence (1992). "The Future of a Commodity: Notes toward a Critique of Cyberpunk and the Information Age". Science Fiction Studies. 19 (1): 75–88. doi:10.1525/sfs.19.1.075. ISSN 0091-7729. JSTOR 4240123.

=== News ===
- Adams, Tim (August 12, 2007). "Space to think". The Observer. ISSN 0029-7712.
- Andreeva, Nellie (June 28, 2024). "Neuromancer: Briana Middleton Joins Callum Turner In Apple TV+ Series". Deadline Hollywood.
- Child, Ben (May 14, 2010). "Is William Gibson's Neuromancer too vast for the big screen?". The Guardian. ISSN 0261-3077.
- Child, Ben (August 2, 2012). "Will Liam Neeson and Mark Wahlberg be plugging into Neuromancer?". The Guardian. ISSN 0261-3077.
- Cordero, Rosy (2024b). "'Beef's Joseph Lee Joins Leading Cast Of Apple TV+ Drama 'Neuromancer'". Deadline.
- Cordero, Rosy (2024a). "Apple Greenlights New Sci-Fi Drama Series 'Neuromancer' Based On William Gibson Novel". Deadline Hollywood.
- Couch, Aaron (2017). "'Deadpool' Director Tim Miller to Adapt 'Neuromancer' for Fox". Hollywood Reporter.
- Liptak, Andrew (2014). "30 Years of William Gibson's Neuromancer". Kirkus Reviews.
- Perez, Hugo (January 8, 2012). "Power in This Weird Grey Box: William Gibson's First Technology Memory". VICE.
- Petski, Denise (March 6, 2025). "Clémence Poésy Joins 'Neuromancer' Apple TV+ Series". Deadline.
- Robertson, Adi (October 1, 2013). "Timothy Leary's 'Neuromancer' video game could have been incredible". The Verge.
- Walker, Martin (September 3, 1996). "Blade Runner on electro-steroids". The Mail & Guardian.
- Otterman, Joe (April 23, 2024). "Callum Turner to Star in 'Neuromancer' Series at Apple TV+". Variety.
- Weber, Bruce (January 11, 2015). "Robert Stone, Novelist of the Vietnam Era and Beyond, Dies at 77". The New York Times. ISSN 0362-4331.

==== Reviews ====
- "Novel probes future computers". The Evening Sun. June 29, 1984. p. 10.
- Johnston, Kelvin (December 23, 1984). "Science fiction". The Observer. p. 28.
- "Sci-fi". The Roanoke Times. September 26, 1983. p. 5.
- "Science Fiction". Newsday. July 8, 1984. p. 150.

=== Websites ===
- Alexander, Leigh (September 3, 2014). "Lo-Fi Let's Play: Neuromancer". Rock, Paper, Shotgun.
- Anthony, James (January 11, 2008). "In cyberspace, no one can hear the Neuromancer fans scream". The Guardian. ISSN 0261-3077.
- Gibson, Wiliam (January 8, 2003). "William Gibson Blog". William Gibson Books. Archived from the original on September 26, 2007.
- Hamman, Cody (March 20, 2025). "Neuromancer: Apple TV's William Gibson adaptation adds Dane DeHaan". JoBlo.
- Kinnear, Simon (October 14, 2013). "50 Amazing Unmade Movies". GamesRadar+.
- Pleshaw, Gregory J. (1995). "Neuromancer Speaks!". Wired. ISSN 1059-1028.
- Sawyer, Robert (January 13, 2016). "Hugo / Nebula / PKDick overlap — and SF's true Triple Crown". Robert J. Sawyer.
- Grossman, Lev (2005). "All-Time 100 Novels". Time. ISSN 0040-781X. Archived from the original on April 6, 2020.
