= Mona Lisa Overdrive =

1988 science fiction novel by William Gibson

- Cover of first edition (hardcover)
- Author: William Gibson
- Series: Sprawl trilogy
- Genre: Science fiction, cyberpunk
- Publisher: Victor Gollancz Ltd
- Publication date: 1988
- Media type: Print (hardcover and paperback)
- Pages: 251
- ISBN: 0-553-05250-0
- OCLC: 17876008
- Dewey Decimal: 813/.54 19
- LC Class: PS3557.I2264 M65 1988
- Preceded by: Count Zero

Mona Lisa Overdrive is a science fiction novel by American-Canadian writer William Gibson, published in 1988. It is the final novel of the cyberpunk Sprawl trilogy, following Neuromancer and Count Zero, taking place eight years after the events of the latter. The novel was nominated for the Nebula Award for Best Novel, the Hugo Award for Best Novel, and the Locus Award for Best Science Fiction Novel in 1989.

== Plot ==
Taking place eight years after the events of Count Zero and fifteen years after Neuromancer, the story is formed from several interconnecting plot threads, and also features characters from Gibson's previous works (such as Molly Millions, the razor-fingered mercenary from Neuromancer).

Thread one: concerns Mona, a teen prostitute who has a more-than-passing resemblance to famed Simstim superstar Angie Mitchell (one of the characters featured in Count Zero). Mona is hired by shady individuals for a "gig" which later turns out to be part of a plot to abduct Angie.

Thread two: focuses on a young half-Japanese girl named Kumiko Yanaka, daughter of a yakuza boss, who is sent to London to keep her safe while her father engages in a gang war with other top yakuza leaders. In London, she is cared for by one of her father's retainers, who is also a powerful member of the London Mob. She meets Molly Millions (having altered her appearance and now calling herself "Sally Shears", in order to conceal her identity from hostile parties who are implied to be pursuing her), who takes the girl under her wing.

Thread three: follows a reclusive artist named Slick Henry, who lives in a place named Factory in the Dog Solitude; a large, poisoned expanse of deserted factories and dumps, probably in southern New Jersey. Slick Henry is a convicted car thief whose punishment consisted of having his short-term memory erased every five minutes, leading to continuous confusion and dissociation. Following the end of his sentence, he spends his days creating large robotic sculptures and periodically suffers episodes of time loss, returning to consciousness afterward with no memory of what he did during the blackout. He is coerced by an acquaintance to look after the comatose "Count" (Bobby Newmark, the titular character of Count Zero, who has hooked himself into a super-capacity cyber-bio hard drive called an Aleph).

Thread four: follows Angie, who can access cyberspace directly without the use of any computer hardware thanks to brain alterations made by her father when she was a child. Her production company has provided her with drugs that severely impede this ability, but she decides to break her addiction as a means of reinvigorating her career.

The four plotlines merge when Sally foils the abduction attempt and takes both Angie and Mona to Factory, where Angie and Bobby permanently upload their consciousnesses into the Aleph (now connected to the matrix) and leave their bodies to die. Having already undergone cosmetic surgery to make herself appear identical to Angie, Mona takes her place as a simstim star, while Sally gets her entire criminal past wiped out. The Aleph is on the verge of making contact with an alien artificial intelligence located near Alpha Centauri, detected by the matrix when it attained sentience at the end of Neuromancer.

== Influences ==
The story of the reclusive artist who makes cybernetic sculptures is a reference to Mark Pauline of Survival Research Labs.

The name of the dense lump of cybernetic hardware that Bobby Newmark's consciousness is jacked into is a direct reference to the short story "The Aleph" by Argentinian author Jorge Luis Borges. The titular Aleph is a point in space which contains all other points, and if one were to gaze into the Aleph one would be able to see or experience the entirety of existence.

== Reception ==
Thomas M. Disch reviewed the novel for the New York Times, giving it a mixed review: "Only in retrospect, however, is Mona Lisa Overdrive a disappointment. Zing by zing, its 45 chapters provide a sufficiency of non-nutritive fun." It received positive reviews in Kirkus Reviews and Publishers Weekly.

== Legacy ==
A track of the score for the film The Matrix Reloaded by Juno Reactor and Don Davis was named "Mona Lisa Overdrive". The Matrix trilogy was heavily influenced by Gibson's writing. A different version of the song is on Juno Reactor's album Labyrinth.

A track in the album Mista Thug Isolation by Lil Ugly Mane is titled "Mona Lisa Overdrive".

Japanese rock band Buck-Tick's album of the same name was mistakenly named as such, since Hisashi Imai confused it with Robert Longo's 1986 wall sculpture Samurai Overdrive when naming the album.
