= Johnny Mnemonic =

1980s William Gibson short story

- Short story by William Gibson
- Standalone edition cover
- Language: English
- Genre: Cyberpunk

Publication
- Published in: Omni; Burning Chrome (1986)
- Media type: Magazine
- Publication date: May 1981

Chronology
Fragments of a Hologram Rose	The Gernsback Continuum

"Johnny Mnemonic" is a cyberpunk short story by American-Canadian writer William Gibson. It first appeared in Omni magazine in May 1981, and was subsequently included in Burning Chrome, a 1986 collection of Gibson's short fiction. It takes place in the world of Gibson's cyberpunk novels, predating them by some years, and introduces the character Molly Millions, who plays a prominent role in the Sprawl trilogy of novels. It was nominated for a Nebula Award in 1982.

The short story served as the basis for the 1995 film Johnny Mnemonic, whose plot uses the same basic premise but otherwise differs considerably. A novelization of Gibson's screenplay written by Terry Bisson was published in 1995. In 1996, a film tie-in edition of Gibson's original short story was published as a standalone book.

== Plot summary ==
Johnny is a data trafficker who has undergone cybernetic surgery to have a data storage system implanted in his head. The system allows him to store digital data too sensitive to risk transmission on computer networks. To keep the cargo secure, the data is locked by a password known only to the intended recipient.

Johnny enters a trance-like state while the data is being transferred or the password is being set, making him unaware of the contents and unable to retrieve them. He makes a modest living in the Sprawl by physically transporting sensitive information for corporations, underworld crime rings or wealthy individuals.

As the story opens, Johnny has arranged to meet with his most recent customer, Ralfi Face, at the Drome bar. Ralfi is overdue to retrieve the hundreds of megabytes of data he has stored in Johnny's head. To add to his troubles, Johnny has learned that Ralfi has placed a contract on him, although the reasons are unclear.

Johnny finds Ralfi at his usual table, accompanied by his bodyguard Lewis. Johnny threatens them with a sawed-off shotgun in his bag, but Lewis incapacitates him with a neural disruption device hidden under the table. Ralfi reveals that the data was stolen from the yakuza, who are very interested in ensuring it is not revealed, and that he had not been aware of the theft when he hired Johnny.

Johnny is rescued by Molly, a "razorgirl" who has undergone extensive body modifications, most notably razor-sharp blades under her fingernails. She joins the three men at their table, looking for a job. When Lewis tries to attack her, she cuts his wrist tendons and takes the incapacitating control device from him.

Ralfi offers to pay her off, but she deactivates the device and frees Johnny, who immediately offers a higher bid to hire her as a bodyguard. Johnny and Molly take Ralfi as they exit the bar, but a yakuza assassin waiting outside cuts Ralfi to pieces with a monomolecular wire hidden in a prosthetic thumb. Johnny fires his shotgun at the assassin but misses due to the man's enhanced reflexes. Molly is delighted to be facing another professional.

Johnny decides that the only way to save himself from the same fate as Ralfi is to get the data out of his head, which can be done only by using a SQUID to retrieve the password. Molly takes him to an amusement park to meet Jones, a cybernetically enhanced dolphin retired from Navy service. Jones' previous assignment was to locate and hack into enemy mines using the SQUID and other sensors implanted in his skull.

Since Jones is now addicted to heroin, the result of the Navy's efforts to keep its dolphins loyal, Molly trades him a batch in exchange for finding the password. Johnny then has Molly read it out so he can enter his retrieval trance, with recorders capturing all the data. They upload a snippet to a yakuza communications satellite and threaten to release the rest unless Johnny is left alone.

To deal with the yakuza assassin who is still following them, Molly leads Johnny to the Lo Teks, a group of anti-technology outcasts who live in a suspended hideout near the top of the geodesic domes covering the Sprawl. At Molly's request, the Lo Teks allow the assassin to climb up so she can face him on the "Killing Floor", a sprung-floor arena wired to synthesizers and amplifiers. Molly dances around the assassin, causing discordant noise to blare from the sound system, and tricks him into slicing off his own hand with his thumb wire. Overwhelmed by the noise and the strange environment, he jumps through a hole in the floor and falls to his death.

The story closes nearly a year later, with Johnny now living among the Lo Teks. He and Molly have gone into business for themselves, using Jones' SQUID to retrieve traces of all the data he has ever carried and blackmailing former clients with it.

== Later mention ==
In Gibson's 1984 novel Neuromancer, the first of the Sprawl trilogy, Molly relates the rest of Johnny's story to the protagonist, Case. Molly claims that, after achieving success, Johnny was murdered by a vat-grown yakuza ninja.

== Sources ==
- Gibson, William Carleton (1996). Johnny Mnemonic. Toronto: HarperCollins. ISBN 0-00-224618-X.
- Bisson, Terry (1995). Johnny Mnemonic. New York: Pocket Books. ISBN 0-671-52300-7.
