= The Winter Market =

- Short story by William Gibson
- Country: Canada
- Language: English
- Genre: Science fiction

Publication
- Published in: Burning Chrome
- Publication type: Anthology
- Publisher: Arbor House
- Publication date: April 1986

Chronology
New Rose Hotel	Dogfight

"The Winter Market" is a science fiction short story written by William Gibson and published as part of his Burning Chrome short story collection. The story was commissioned in 1985 by Vancouver Magazine, who stipulated that Gibson – who at the time was "unquestionably the leading Vancouver author on the international literary scene" – set it in the city (thereby making it unique among the author's works until 2007, when he set the final third of Spook Country in and around the Port of Vancouver).

The market of the title was modelled on that of Granville Island, though in a state of bohemian decay. As the author commented in a 2007 blog post: "Vancouver's Granville Island, centered around Granville Island Market (produce and food fair) is a very successful (and pleasant) retrofit of an under-bridge urban island that previously was heavily industrial. When the story was written, the retrofit was recent, and I dirtied it up for requisite punky near-future effect."

== Plot ==
The story's narrator, Casey, works as an editor at a Vancouver studio that specializes in turning the images from people's dreams into movie-like productions. While attending a party hosted by his friend, junk artist Rubin Stark, he meets a young, drug-addicted woman named Lise who relies on an exoskeleton to move. She suffers from a degenerative disease that greatly hampers her mobility, and she wears the exoskeleton at all times even though it causes abrasions on her skin. Rubin describes to Casey the circumstances under which he first met Lise. He had been scavenging in an alley for materials when he found her sitting motionless and seemingly waiting to die, her exoskeleton having run out of battery power.

Casey takes Lise home from the party and, at her request, connects their brains so he can see her dreams directly. The images are so vivid, powerful, and unsettling that he brings her to his boss's attention as the start of a new project. Casey works with Lise for three weeks as the project expands, but her physical condition steadily deteriorates from the effects of her disease and addiction. Shortly after the recording sessions are completed, Casey sees Lise for what turns out to be the last time, meeting a random man in a bar in search of a final pleasurable experience.

The finished project, released under the title Kings of Sleep, proves to be a tremendous commercial success. Lise uses her share of the profits to have her consciousness uploaded onto a computer server, in order to achieve a form of immortality and free herself from the constant physical pain of her life. She dies and her body is cremated.

Casey dreads the thought of receiving a telephone call from Lise, wondering if it will be the true person or only a program constructed from her mind. Rubin comments that she will need to release some new material soon in order to pay the fees charged by the data storage company for keeping her on file, and suggests that Casey should be ready to work with her again.

== Analysis ==
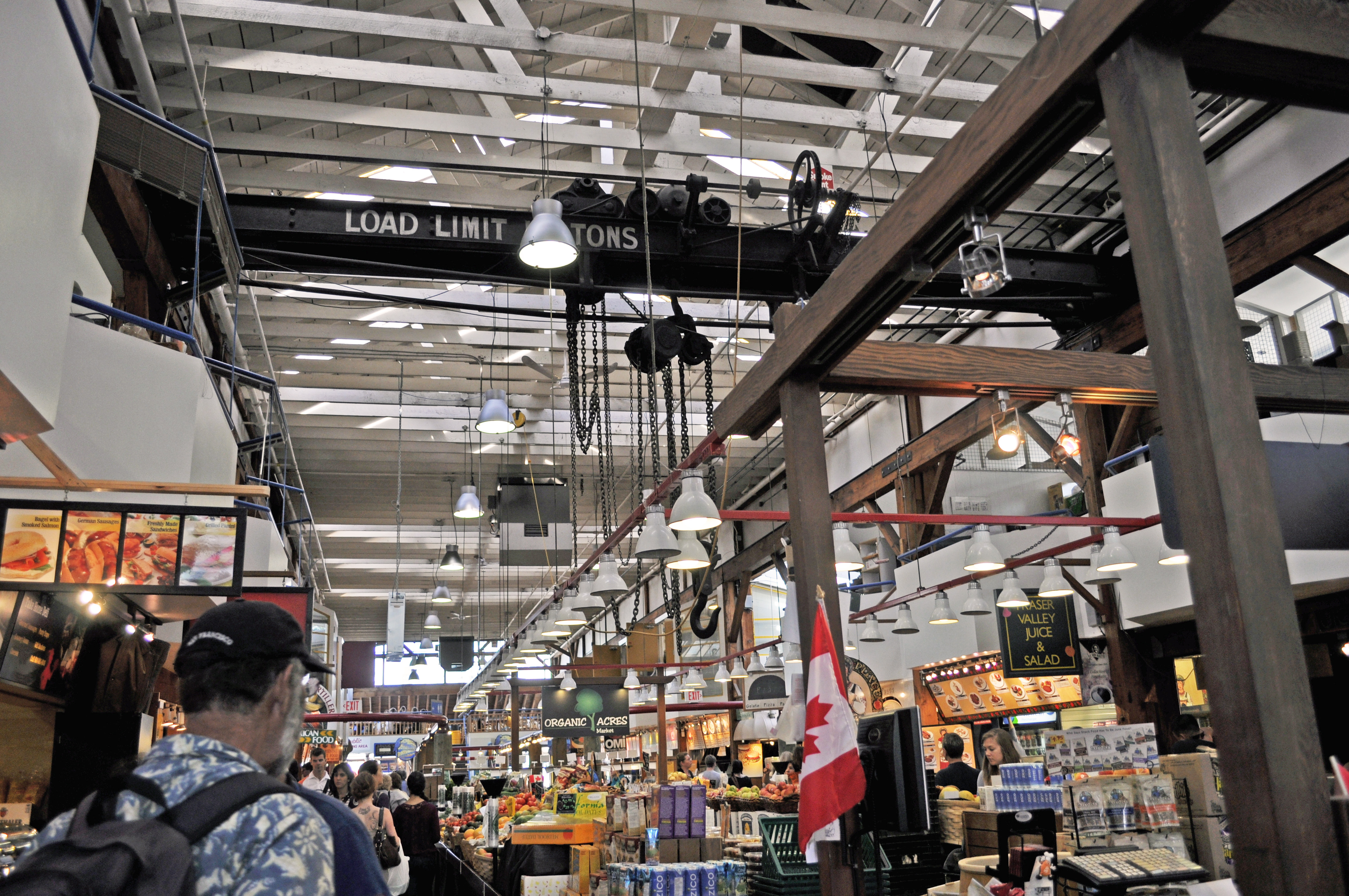
A 2010 photograph of the interior of the Granville Island public market, on which the market of the story's title is based

According to the analysis of critic Pramod Nayar, the story "depicts the body as a vehicle for experiencing dreams edited into Hollywood thrillers".

Critic David Seed saw the character of Rubin as a "thinly disguised" incarnation of performance artist Mark Pauline of Survival Research Laboratories.

== Reception ==
The story was critically well-received, garnering nominations for the Hugo Award for Best Novelette, the Nebula Award for Best Novelette, the "short-form, English" Prix Aurora award, and the British Science Fiction Association award for best short story. It also finished highly in several science fiction magazines' annual readers polls in 1987, coming fourth in the Locus novelette category, third in the Interzone fiction category, and joint second in the Science Fiction Chronicle novelette category.
