= New Rose Hotel =

1984 short story by William Gibson

- Short story by William Gibson
- Omni, July 1984
- Country: Canada
- Language: English
- Genre: Cyberpunk

Publication
- Published in: Omni
- Publication type: Periodical
- Media type: Print (magazine, hardback and paperback)
- Publication date: 1984

Chronology
- Series: Sprawl trilogy
Hinterlands	The Belonging Kind

"New Rose Hotel" is a short story by William Gibson, first published in Omni in July 1984 and later included in his 1986 collection Burning Chrome.

"New Rose Hotel" presents a bleak future as extrapolated from contemporary economic and social trends. Set in the same period and universe as Gibson's Sprawl trilogy, it is solidly cyberpunk in its style and vision.

== Plot ==
The story is set in a future when huge megacorporations have gained enough influence to control the economies of entire countries. Their wealth and competitive advantage stem from the human capital of their employees and the intellectual property they produce. Corporations guard their most valuable employees and go to great expense to keep them safe and productive. There is little point in traditional corporate espionage, as new technologies are developed so quickly that stolen secrets soon become obsolete. Instead, the field has now evolved to the point of enticing employees to switch their loyalty from one company to another and arranging for their escape―a dangerous endeavor, given the tight security in place around such individuals.

Two male free-lance agents, Fox and the unnamed narrator, have been hired by the Japanese firm Hosaka to bring genetic researcher Hiroshi Yomiuri over from Maas Biolabs GmbH, a German rival. They bring in a third associate, a woman named Sandii, to seduce Hiroshi and persuade him to defect. The narrator begins a relationship with Sandii as the three arrange for Hiroshi's move to a secret laboratory in Marrakesh, purchased by the narrator with Hosaka funds. On the night before the transfer is to take place, the narrator spends time with Sandii and finds an unlabeled computer disk in her purse, but disregards it.

Fox, Sandii, and the narrator orchestrate Hiroshi's disappearance from a street in Vienna and spirit him away to the Marrakesh lab. Hosaka pays the three and erases all evidence of having done business with them; the two men fly to Japan and part ways with Sandii. The company sends its top researchers to the lab to meet with Hiroshi, only for everyone there to die or suffer permanent brain damage in a sudden outbreak of disease. Hosaka wipes out the bank accounts of Fox and the narrator, cuts off their business connections, and sends assassins to kill them, blaming them for the deaths. The two men flee, realizing that Sandii had secretly defected to Maas and reprogrammed Hiroshi's equipment to release the virus. Fox falls to his death after being pushed off a mezzanine railing, while the narrator goes into hiding at the titular New Rose Hotel, a run-down capsule hotel.

One week later, the narrator is still there, contemplating suicide, pining for Sandii while berating himself for overlooking the disk and her treachery, and waiting for Hosaka forces to arrive.

== Film adaptation ==
Director Abel Ferrara adapted the short story as a feature film, New Rose Hotel, released in 1998; the film follows the plot of the short story with some minor changes such as the manner of Fox's death. Fox is portrayed by Christopher Walken, Hiroshi is portrayed by Yoshitaka Amano, Sandii is portrayed by Asia Argento, and X is portrayed by Willem Dafoe. Renowned Japanese composer, Ryuichi Sakamoto, makes a brief appearance as a Hosaka executive.
