= Sprawl trilogy =

Three cyberpunk novels (1984–1988) by William Gibson

- Author: William Gibson
- Country: United States
- Language: English
- Discipline: Science fiction (cyberpunk)
- Published: 1984, 1986, 1988
- Media type: Print, digital
- No. of books: 3

The Sprawl trilogy (also known as the Neuromancer trilogy) is William Gibson's first set of novels, and is composed of Neuromancer (1984), Count Zero (1986), and Mona Lisa Overdrive (1988).

The novels are all set in the same fictional future. The Sprawl trilogy shares this setting with Gibson's short stories "Johnny Mnemonic" (1981), "Burning Chrome" (1982), and "New Rose Hotel" (1984).

== Setting and story arc ==
The novels are set in a near-future world dominated by corporations and ubiquitous computing. The events of the novels are spaced over 16 years, and although there are familiar characters that appear, each novel tells a self-contained story. Gibson focuses on the effects of technology: the unintended consequences as it filters out of research labs and onto the street where it finds new purposes. He explores a world of direct mind-machine links ("jacking in"), emerging machine intelligence, and a global information space, which he calls "cyberspace". Some of the novels' action takes place in The Sprawl, officially the "Boston-Atlanta Metropolitan Axis", an urban environment extending along most of the East Coast of the United States (as a fictional extrapolation of the real-life Northeast megalopolis).

The story arc which frames the trilogy follows a wide cast of characters in a persistent, ongoing narrative - the major commonality between the three being The Sprawl itself. It focuses on the self-contained stories of each character, and highlights their narrative links through suggestion, references, and imagery.

Neuromancer tells the story of Case, a cyberspace "cowboy" (hacker) who gets picked up for a job with an unknown benefactor. The book is the only one in the trilogy that follows a single cohesive plot, with the sequels both featuring multi-strand narrative structures that culminate in the end.

Count Zero consists of three major protagonists, and chapters alternate from one character's story to the next. The first of these is Turner, an ex-military mercenary. After becoming the victim of a bombing attack, Turner is hired by an old colleague to assist the dangerous extraction of a tech developer. The second is of Bobby Newmark, a teenager living in the slums with his mother. After an attempt at an illegal cyberspace run, Bobby is forced into hiding when it becomes apparent his experiment has put a target on his back. The third is of Marly Krushkova, a disgraced art museum curator who, after being caught in a major fraud scam, is hired by the immensely wealthy Josef Virek to find the artist behind a series of enigmatic artworks.

Finally, Mona Lisa Overdrive follows four narrative plot threads in a pattern similar to that of Count Zero. The first is of Kumiko, teenage daughter to a Yakuza boss, whose father sends her to London to keep her safe during an anticipated gang war. The second is of artist Slick Henry, who spends his time making robots from scrap metal. Slick is suddenly thrust into the intrigue of the novel when someone calls in a debt by asking him to watch over a cyberspace cowboy locked in a run. The third thread follows prostitute Mona and her relationship with her abusive boyfriend/pimp. The final plot thread follows Angie Mitchell, a "simstim" (virtual sensory movies) actress in rehabilitation who can access cyberspace mentally.

== Reception ==
The trilogy was commercially and critically successful. Steven Poole, writing in The Guardian, described "Neuromancer and the two novels which followed, Count Zero (1986) and the gorgeously titled Mona Lisa Overdrive (1988)" as making up "a fertile holy trinity, a sort of Chrome Koran (the name of one of Gibson's future rock bands) of ideas inviting endless reworkings".

All three books were nominated for major science fiction awards, including:

- Neuromancer – Nebula & Philip K. Dick Awards winner, British Science Fiction Award nominee, 1984; Hugo Award winner, 1985
- Count Zero – Nebula and British Science Fiction awards nominee, 1986; Hugo and Locus Awards nominee, 1987
- Mona Lisa Overdrive – Hugo, Nebula, and Locus Awards nominee, 1989
