= Burning Chrome =

Short story by William Gibson

- Short story by William Gibson
- Country: Canada
- Language: English
- Genre: Cyberpunk

Publication
- Published in: Omni, Burning Chrome
- Publication date: July 1982

Chronology
"The Belonging Kind"	"Red Star, Winter Orbit"

"Burning Chrome" is a science fiction short story by American-Canadian writer William Gibson, first published in Omni in July 1982. Gibson first read the story at a science fiction convention in Denver, Colorado in the autumn of 1981, to an audience of four people, among them Bruce Sterling (who Gibson later said "completely got it"). It was nominated for a Nebula Award in 1983 and collected with the rest of Gibson's early short fiction in a 1986 volume of the same name.

== Plot ==
Bobby Quine, a "console cowboy", and his partner in crime Automatic Jack, a hardware expert, are hackers who, despite their skills and experience, have never landed a really big score. There are rumours going around that Bobby is getting too old for the scene, and losing his touch – until he picks up a new girl, Rikki, at the local hacker bar. Jack, the narrator of the story, goes to the Finn's pawn shop in New York in search of something that will give them an edge. The Finn sells him a stolen program that Jack later identifies as a Russian military "icebreaker" virus for penetrating matrix security. Meanwhile, Bobby has been looking for a target, and settles on Chrome, the Mob-affiliated owner of the House of Blue Lights, a meatpuppet brothel. Jack is horrified by the idea of such a dangerous hit, but realizes that the icebreaker program would give them the edge they need to pull it off.

After six weeks of preparation, the burn goes off without a hitch, and they completely empty out Chrome's bank accounts. Miles, a streetfighter Jack hired to take care of Rikki in case things went wrong, calls Jack to tell him he lost her when she went into the House of Blue Lights, and that everything there is in a state of chaos. Jack realizes that Rikki, who has always loved simstim, had been working there in order to save up for a pair of high-end cybernetic eye implants, just like the eyes of her favourite simstim star. Bobby, who professed to love her, but only saw her as his "luck" and never really took interest in her as a person, had gotten busy with planning the heist and never noticed. Rikki leaves for Hollywood, but Jack calls the airline and changes her ticket to a first-class ticket to Chiba City, where she can better pursue her dream of being a star. She never uses the return ticket he buys her, and he never sees her again.

== Connection to other works ==
The story was one of the first of Gibson's to be set in the Sprawl, and functioned as a conceptual prototype for Gibson's Sprawl trilogy of novels.

Bobby Quine is mentioned in Neuromancer as one of the mentors of the protagonist. The Finn, a recurring character in Gibson's Sprawl trilogy, makes his first appearance in this story as a minor figure. The events of the story are referenced in Count Zero, the second entry of the Sprawl trilogy.

== Reception ==
The word "cyberspace", coined by Gibson, was first used in this story, describing the graphic "consensual hallucination" in computer networks.

One line from the story—"... the street finds its own uses for things"—has become a widely quoted aphorism for describing the sometimes unexpected uses to which users can put technologies (for example, hip-hop DJs' reinvention of the turntable, which transformed turntables from a medium of playback into one of production).

Gibson wrote a screenplay for a film adaptation to be directed by Kathryn Bigelow, but the project did not come to fruition.

The BBC did an hour-long version of the story, first broadcast on BBC Radio 7 (now BBC Radio 4 Extra) on 19 October 2007 and read by Adam Sims.
