= Omni (magazine) =

Former science and science fiction magazine

- Cover of the October 1984 edition
- Categories: Science and Science fiction magazine
- Founder: Kathy Keeton; Bob Guccione
- First issue: October 1978; 48 years ago
- Final issue: 1997
- Company: General Media, Inc.
- Country: United States
- Based in: New York City
- Language: English
- Website: omnimagazine.com
- ISSN: 0149-8711

Omni was a science and science fiction magazine published for domestic American and UK markets. It contained articles on science, parapsychology, and short works of science fiction and fantasy. It was published as a print version between October 1978 and 1995. The first Omni e-magazine was published on CompuServe in 1986 and the magazine switched to a purely online presence in 1996. It ceased publication abruptly in late 1997, following the death of co-founder Kathy Keeton; activity on the magazine's website ended the following April.

== History ==
=== Concept ===
Omni was founded by Kathy Keeton and her long-time collaborator and future husband Bob Guccione, the publisher of Penthouse magazine. The initial concept came from Keeton, who wanted a magazine "that explored all realms of science and the paranormal, that delved into all corners of the unknown and projected some of those discoveries into fiction".

Dick Teresi, an author and former Good Housekeeping editor, wrote the proposal for the magazine, from which a dummy was produced. In pre-launch publicity it was referred to as Nova but the name was changed before the first issue went to print to avoid a conflict with the PBS science show of the same name. Guccione described the magazine as "an original if not controversial mixture of science fact, fiction, fantasy and the paranormal". The debut edition had an exclusive interview with Freeman Dyson, a renowned physicist, and the second edition carried an interview with Alvin Toffler, futurist and author of Future Shock.

=== Fiction ===
In its early run, Omni published a number of stories that have become genre classics, such as Orson Scott Card's "Unaccompanied Sonata", William Gibson's "Burning Chrome", "New Rose Hotel" and "Johnny Mnemonic", and George R. R. Martin's "Sandkings". The magazine also published original science fiction and fantasy by William S. Burroughs, Joyce Carol Oates, Jonathan Carroll, Julio Cortázar, T. Coraghessan Boyle, and other mainstream writers. The magazine excerpted Stephen King's novel Firestarter, and featured his short story "The End of the Whole Mess". Omni also brought the works of numerous painters to the attention of a large audience, such as H. R. Giger, De Es Schwertberger and Rallé. In the early 1980s, popular fiction stories from Omni were reprinted in The Best of Omni Science Fiction series and featured art by space artists like Robert McCall. A fictional cover of the magazine appears in the 1984 "Ghostbusters" movie, featuring a photo of the proton pack on the cover.

=== Market ===
Omni entered the market at the start of a wave of new science magazines aimed at educated but otherwise "non-professional" readers. Science Digest and Science News already served the high-school market, and Scientific American and New Scientist the professional, while Omni was arguably the first aimed at "armchair scientists" who were nevertheless well informed about technical issues. The next year, however, Time introduced Discover while the AAAS introduced Science '80. Advertising dollars were spread among the different magazines, and those without deep pockets soon folded in the 1980s, notably Science Digest, while Science '80 merged with Discover. Omni appeared to weather this storm better than most, likely due to its wider selection of contents. In early 1996 publisher Bob Guccione suspended publication of the print edition of Omni, attributing the decision to the rising price of paper and postage. At the end of its print run the circulation was still reported to be more than 700,000 copies a month.

In September 1997, Keeton died of complications from surgery for an intestinal obstruction. The staff of Omni Internet was laid off, and no new content was added to the website after April 1998. General Media shut the site down and removed the Omni archives from the Internet in 2003.

== Editions ==
=== International editions ===
Omni magazine was published in at least six languages. The content in the British editions closely followed the North American editions, but with a different numbering sequence. This was mainly accomplished by wrapping the American edition in a new cover which featured British advertising on the inside. At least one British edition was entirely unique and was shipped under the banner of Omni UK. An Italian edition was edited by Alberto Peruzzo and ran for 20 issues from 1981 to 1983, when Peruzzo detached the name Omni from his local edition. The Italian spin-off continued with the name Futura, while maintaining the same graphical style and with an unchanged intended audience, for another twenty issues, up to July 1985. The Japanese edition ran from 1982 to the summer of 1989 and included almost entirely different content from the American edition. The German edition began in 1984 and ended in early 1986. The first Spanish edition appeared in November 1986 and ran until the summer of 1988. A Russian edition was published in the Soviet Union beginning in September 1989 in conjunction with the USSR Academy of Sciences. These editions were 80% in English and featured both Russian and English advertising. Publisher Guccione arranged for 20,000 copies of the Russian edition to be placed on news stands and onboard internal Aeroflot flights in the Soviet Union in exchange for an equivalent number of copies of Science in Russia being distributed in the USA. Omni ran subscription adverts beginning in August 1989 for Science in Russia. This arrangement was intended to last for one year and was made possible by the Glasnost events in the Soviet Union.

=== Webzine ===
Omni first began its online presence as part of Compuserve in the summer of 1986. On September 5, 1993, Omni became part of the America Online service. The AOL unveiling took place at the 51st World Science Fiction Convention in San Francisco. AOL subscribers had access to much of the Omni printed archive as well as forums, chat groups and new fiction. After the print magazine folded, the Omni Internet webzine was launched on September 15, 1996. For the first few months the new website was integrated into the AOL service, replacing the existing AOL Omni interface. Now free of pressure to focus on fringe science areas, Omni returned to its roots as the home of gonzo science writing, becoming one of the first large-scale venues to deliver a journalism geared specifically to cyberspace, complete with real-time coverage of major science events, chats and blogs with scientific luminaries, and interactive experiments that users could join. The world's top science fiction writers also joined in, writing collaborative fiction pieces for Omni's readers live online.

=== Television ===
A short-lived syndicated television show based on the magazine's format (and called Omni: The New Frontier) aired in the United States beginning in September 1981, hosted by Peter Ustinov. A French-language, dubbed version of the show appeared on the Canadian public TV network Radio-Québec (now known as Télé-Québec) in 1994. In 1985, extracts of the 1981 television series were re-edited and repackaged into four television shows hosted by Keir Dullea under the title Omni: Visions of the Future. Episodes were titled Futurebody, Space, Amazing Medicine and Lifestyles in the 21st Century.

=== Comics ===
An equally short-lived spin-off magazine called Omni Comix debuted in 1995, and was published in the same glossy, newsstand magazine format as its sister publications Omni, Penthouse and Penthouse Comix. Omni Comix ran for only three issues, and the third and final issue featured an abortive revival of the 1960s superhero series T.H.U.N.D.E.R. Agents.

=== Anthologies ===
From 1983 to 1986, Zebra Books published a series of anthologies containing selected non-fiction content from Omni magazine:

- The Omni Book of Space edited by Owen Davies (ISBN 0-8217-1275-6, published in October 1983)
- The Omni Book of Computers and Robots edited by Owen Davies (ISBN 0-8217-1276-4, published in October 1983)
- The Omni Book of Medicine edited by Owen Davies (ISBN 0-8217-1364-7, published in April 1984)
- The Omni Book of the Paranormal & the Mind edited by Owen Davies (ISBN 0-8217-1365-5, published in April 1984)
- The Omni Book of Psychology edited by Peter Tyson (ISBN 0-8217-1868-1, published in July 1986)
- The Omni Book of High-Tech Society 2000 edited by Peter Tyson (ISBN 0-8217-1896-7, published in September 1986)

From 1984 to 1989, Zebra Books also published a series of Science Fiction anthologies containing stories published in Omni magazine with all volumes edited by Ellen Datlow who was also serving as the editor of Omni magazine at the time:

- The First Omni Book of Science Fiction (ISBN 0-8217-1319-1, published in January 1984)
- The Second Omni Book of Science Fiction (ISBN 0-8217-1320-5, published in January 1984)
- The Third Omni Book of Science Fiction (ISBN 0-8217-1575-5, published in April 1985)
- The Fourth Omni Book of Science Fiction (ISBN 0-8217-1630-1, published in July 1985)
- The Fifth Omni Book of Science Fiction (ISBN 0-8217-2050-3, published in April 1987)
- The Sixth Omni Book of Science Fiction (ISBN 0-8217-2606-4, published in March 1989)
- The Seventh Omni Book of Science Fiction (ISBN 0-8217-2688-9, published in June 1989)

Ellen Datlow also edited and released the following Science Fiction anthologies of stories published in Omni magazine under the OMNI Books imprint:

- Omni Best Science Fiction One (ISBN 0-87455-277-X, published in October 1992)
- Omni Best Science Fiction Two (ISBN 0-87455-278-8, published in November 1992)
- Omni Best Science Fiction Three (ISBN 0-87455-284-2, published in June 1993)
- Omni Visions One (ISBN 0-87455-298-2, published in November 1993)
- Omni Visions Two (ISBN 0-87455-308-3, published in July 1994)

Pharos books also published The Omni Future Almanac edited by Robert Weil.

- The Omni Future Almanac (ISBN 978-0345310347, published in December 1983)

Published by Ticknor & Fields:

- The Omni Interviews edited by Pamela Weintraub (ISBN 9780899192154, published in 1984)

== Editorial staff ==
The magazine was initially edited by Frank Kendig, who left several months after the magazine's launch. Ben Bova, who was hired as fiction editor, was promoted to editor. Bova then left the magazine in 1981. Subsequent editors included Dick Teresi, Gurney Williams III, Patrice Adcroft, Keith Ferrell, and Pamela Weintraub (editor of Omni as one of the first major standalone webzines from 1996 to 1998). Kathleen Stein managed the magazine's prestigious Q&A interviews with the top scientists of the 20th century through 1998. Ellen Datlow was associate fiction editor of Omni under Robert Sheckley for one and a half years, and took over as fiction editor in 1981 until the magazine was suspended in 1998. In 2016, two print issues of OMNI were published by members of the original staff, including Weintraub and Datlow. Under the umbrella of PGMI, OMNI was reimagined as a series of print quarterlies starting in 2017 , with Pamela Weintraub as editor-in-chief and Ellen Datlow as fiction editor. Other team members include Robert Killheffer and Corey S. Powell as executive editors and Matt Westphalen as creative director.

Issue data for 1978 to 1995
	Spring			Summer			Fall			Winter		
	Jan	Feb	Mar	Apr	May	Jun	Jul	Aug	Sep	Oct	Nov	Dec
1979										1/1	1/2	1/3
1979	1/4	1/5	1/6	1/7	1/8	1/9	1/10	1/11	1/12	2/1	2/2	2/3
1980	2/4	2/5	2/6	2/7	2/8	2/9	2/10	2/11	2/12	3/1	3/2	3/3
1981	3/4	3/5	3/6	3/7	3/8	3/9	3/10	3/11	3/12	4/1	4/2	4/3
1982	4/4	4/5	4/6	4/7	4/8	4/9	4/10	4/11	4/12	5/1	5/2	5/3
1983	5/4	5/5	5/6	5/7	5/8	5/9	5/10	5/11	5/12	6/1	6/2	6/3
1984	6/4	6/5	6/6	6/7	6/8	6/9	6/10	6/11	6/12	7/1	7/2	7/3
1985	7/4	7/5	7/6	7/7	7/8	7/9	7/10	7/11	7/12	8/1	8/2	8/3
1986	8/4	8/5	8/6	8/7	8/8	8/9	8/10	8/11	8/12	9/1	9/2	9/3
1987	9/4	9/5	9/6	9/7	9/8	9/9	9/10	9/11	9/12	10/1	10/2	10/3
1988	10/4	10/5	10/6	10/7	10/8	10/9	10/10	10/11	10/12	11/1	11/2	11/3
1989	11/4	11/5	11/6	11/7	11/8	11/9	11/10	11/11	11/12	12/1	12/2	12/3
1990	12/4	12/5	12/6	12/7	12/8	12/9	12/10	12/11	12/12	13/1	13/2	13/3
1991	13/4	13/5	13/6	13/7	13/8	13/9	13/10	13/11	13/12	14/1	14/2	14/3
1992	14/4	14/5	14/6	14/7	14/8	14/9	14/10	14/11	14/12	15/1	15/2	15/3
1993	15/4	15/5		15/6	15/7	15/8	15/9	15/10	15/11	16/1	16/2	16/3
1994	16/4	16/5	16/6	16/7	16/8	16/9	16/10	16/11	16/12	17/1	17/2	17/3
1995	17/4	17/5	17/6	17/7			17/8			17/9		
Issues of IoMNI, showing volume/issue number. Underlining indicates that an issue was titled as a quarterly (e.g. "Fall 1995") rather than as a monthly. Frank Kendig Ben Bova Dick Teresi Gurney Williams III Patrice Adcroft Keith Ferrell

== Ownership ==
In 2013, Glenn Fleishman undertook a research project with the goal of learning who currently owns the Omni intellectual property, and concluded that the rights to the fiction published in Omni had long since reverted to the original authors (who had only sold first North American publication rights), and that "possibly even the current ostensible owner" may not know who owns the rights to the rest of the content.

=== Reboot ===
In August 2013, plans to launch "a new online project", described as an "Omni reboot", were reported by The Verge. The project was said to be under the guidance of producer Rick Schwartz and businessman/collector Jeremy Frommer, who purchased a storage locker "on a whim" in November 2012 that was found to contain "a sizable chunk of the estate of Bob Guccione". The rediscovered materials include "cover drafts with grease-pencil notations, thousands of 35-mm slides, large-format chromes, magazines bundled with stapled paperwork, production materials, and untold amounts of photos and artwork."

=== Penthouse publishes new Omni ===
Penthouse Global Media acquired Omni in 2017, and announced plans for a new print issue, to commence publication on 24 October. The issue was published and billed as the Winter 2017 issue, the first on a quarterly schedule, but no further issues were ever published.

== See also ==
- Future Life
- Galileo

== Sources ==
- Ashley, Mike (2007). Gateways to Forever: The Story of the Science-Fiction Magazines from 1970–1980. Liverpool: Liverpool University Press. ISBN 978-1-8463100-2-7.
