= Media censorship in Singapore =

Media regulation in the Republic of Singapore is carried out by the Info-communications Media Development Authority (IMDA) and effected by various laws.

== Films and videos ==
=== History ===
Over the years Singapore has gradually moved away from film censorship to film classification. This means that the Board of Film Censors (BFC) now classifies content into age-appropriate ratings. Classification allows films to be suitably rated for different audiences so the public can have greater access to a wider range of media choices without compromising on the need to protect young children from undesirable content.

The importing, making, distributing or exhibiting of films in Singapore is governed by the Films Act of 1981.

==== Before 1991 ====
Film censorship started out strict before the gradual introduction of an official film classification system. As a result, many films were either simply censored to be approved for commercial screening or banned in the past. Films like A Clockwork Orange (1971), Last Tango in Paris (1972), The Texas Chain Saw Massacre (1974) and Saint Jack (1979) were previously banned. In the late 1980s, The Accused (1988) had a five-minute gang rape scene cut, while the fake orgasm sequence in When Harry Met Sally... (1989) was excised, even on its television broadcast in July 1995. Martial arts related films were also censored from 1973 onwards in attempt to restrain the growth in popularity of martial arts.

==== 1991–1998 ====
The first attempt at classification ratings started in 1991 which included the now defunct "R18" and "R(A)" ratings to allow mature audiences to watch such films containing more graphic sexual content and the presence of nudity. The focus of these early content ratings was mainly on sex/nudity content in non-pornographic films in the beginning of Singapore's film classification attempts and thus, other objectionable content such as graphic violence and coarse language were able to slide pass the censors and be accepted under a mere "PG" rating. To prevent the release of further softcore sexploitative films that managed to somehow get by the censors when the film classification system began, The "R18" rating was later revised in the same year to the more stringent "R(A)" or "Restricted (Artistic)" rating and the age limit was raised from 18 to 21. In 1992, "R(A)" movies were restricted to screening in downtown venues only.

- R18: Movies that has sex/nudity, graphic violence and coarse language or other mature content, and meant for 18 and above. A sizable amount of softcore pornography, especially from Hong Kong, entered the market and were released uncut under this rating. Public backlash soon followed.
- R(A): Several months after public backlash, R18 was replaced by "Restricted (Artistic)", which signaled only non-pornographic material would be accessed, and is meant for 21 and above.

==== 1998–2004 ====
In 1993, an "NC16" rating was introduced for films that lacked adult content such as sex and nudity scenes but was still deemed thematically unsuitable for children such as strong graphic violence in a war setting which exceeded the then "PG" guidelines. However, the "NC16" rating was only used five years later in 1998 with the release of the graphic war drama, Saving Private Ryan (1998). Back then, violent content in movies released in Singapore were not held to the same standards as sexual content which enabled Saving Private Ryan to get a lower age-restricted film rating than the "R(A)" rating despite containing multiple scenes of strong graphic war violence. Content standards informally changed in the next few years when brief scenes of sexually related or non-sexually related upper body female frontal nudity/breast nudity and moderate sexual scenes without nudity or other details were gradually allowed under the "NC16" rating with films like Gosford Park (2001) while other films such as The Texas Chainsaw Massacre: The Beginning (2006) and Kill Bill: Volume 1 (2003) received an "R(A)" rating solely for graphic violent content for the first time.

==== 2004 onwards ====
In 2004, film classification became more organised and consumer advisories for titles were added. An "M18" rating was added to provide more choices for young adults and the "R(A)" rating was done away. Violent content in films started to be held to a stricter standard, which resulted in Saving Private Ryan (1998) being re-rated "M18" for its prolonged and intense sequences of graphic war violence under the new classification guidelines. Another example was Gladiator (2000), which would be rated "NC16" under the new guidelines instead of its previous "PG" rating. On the other hand, standards for sexual content in films was being liberalised. Many titles that were previously rated "R(A)" for graphic sex scenes/nudity were re-rated "M18". American Beauty (1999), Lost in Translation (2003) and Shakespeare in Love (1998) were some examples. Titles that still exceeded the guidelines for an "M18" rating were re-rated under "R21", another rating introduced in 2004 which was the maximum age limit for films. Some films that received the "R21" rating were Basic Instinct (1992) and Kill Bill: Volume 1 (2003). Home video classification for films up to an "M18" rating was also introduced in the same year.

Before 2004, some age-restricted shows were unfairly edited to meet the then "PG" classification guidelines to release it as "PG" rated shows for theatrical release by distributors. Such examples included Starship Troopers (1997), Enemy at the Gates (2001) and The Green Mile (1999). They were also edited or disallowed for home video releases as only "G" and "PG" rated titles were allowed on home videos previously. A "PG13" rating was later added in July 2011 on the recommendation of the Censorship Review Committee (CRC) for titles that were deemed unsuitable for young children but not strong enough to warrant an "NC16" rating.

Today the Info-communications Media Development Authority (IMDA) uses a proper and consistent system of age-appropriate film classification, assigning films different ratings for different groups of audiences. They also released the official set of film classification guidelines to the public online in 2010, which included a thorough explanation of what sort of content and themes is allowed under each film rating.

The latest classification system as of 2011 consists of the following:

=== Age-Advisory ratings ===
These three ratings have no restriction in ages.

- G (general) – suitable for all ages. May contain mild violence, occasional alcohol/tobacco consumption, brief displays of affection and mild comical horror. (This classification was introduced in 1991)
- PG (parental guidance) – suitable for most but parents should guide their young. May contain moderate violence without details, mild horror, brief rear nudity, mild to infrequent moderate coarse language (e.g. "asshole", "bastard" etc.), discreet drug references, mild displays of affection (i.e. kissing and caressing) and mild sex references/innuendos. (This classification was introduced in 1991)
- PG13 (parental guidance 13) – suitable for persons aged 13 and above but parental guidance is advised for children below 13. Recommended by the CRC in 2009, the PG13 rating is given to films with content deemed unsuitable for young children but for which a NC16 rating is not warranted. May contain moderate violence with some details and some infliction of pain and injury, moderate gore, some mature themes, more intense and realistic horror, moderate sexual references, sexual innuendoes, sexual imagery, crude hand gestures, sexual humour, discreet references to/ infrequently implied sexual violence, mild homosexual references, rear nudity, side profile nudity, discreet drug use/references, frequent moderate coarse language and infrequent usages of the word "fuck". (This classification was introduced in 2011)

=== Age-restricted ratings ===
In cinemas, these ratings are age-restricted.

- NC16 (no children below 16) – no children below 16 years of age. May contain brief scenes of sexually related or non-sexually related upper body female frontal nudity/breast nudity, moderate sexual activity without nudity or other details, moderate sexual violence, strong sex references, brief same-sex kissing scenes, some homosexual references, graphic violence portraying infliction of pain and injuries with some details of blood and gore, frightening scenes which are more prolonged with disturbing gory images/scenes without strong details, mature themes including (religious themes, homosexual themes and political themes), brief scenes of drug use and strong coarse language (e.g. "motherfucker", "cocksucker" etc.). (This classification was introduced in 1993)
- M18 (mature 18) – for persons 18 years and above. May contain full frontal nudity with moderate detail (sexual & non-sexual context), sexual activity which may feature some details (such as infrequent views of bare breasts) but without stronger details, frequent strong coarse language, drug use with some details, stronger portrayal and exploration of mature themes including (religious themes, homosexual themes/homosexuality as a sub-plot and political themes), implied homosexual activity, occasional displays of affection (i.e. kissing and caressing) between persons of the same gender and prolonged and/or intense sequences that invoke fear and/or terror. (This classification was introduced in 2004)
- R21 (restricted 21) – restricted to persons aged 21 and above. May contain frequent full frontal nudity with strong details (close ups of male/female genitalia) in sexual and non-sexual context, graphic but simulated sexual activity with strong details and could be prolonged/frequent, strong sexual violence, explicit portrayal and exploration of mature themes such as those involving deviant sexual activities (e.g. sadomasochism, bondage, orgies or sex involving violence) or strong homosexual themes including same-sex marriage/parenting as a main theme, homosexual activity with some details, pervasive strong coarse language, strong and realistic depictions of graphic violence and gore, depiction of graphic torture if it is not deemed excessive, hard drug use sequences with strong details and depictions of sustained graphic horror with strong details. (This classification was introduced in 2004). Movies that are classified as R21 are currently excluded from home video releases and suburban theatres. However, as recommended by the latest CRC in September 2010, R21 video-on-demand (VOD) is now allowed on pay TV services. In July 2016, the MDA officially greenlit R21-rated content for Over-the-Top (OTT) services.

=== Refused classification ===
In exceptional cases a film may be refused classification when the content of the film has been deemed to undermine national interest or erode the moral fabric of society. This includes themes that promote issues that denigrate any race or religion, language that denigrates religion or is religiously profane (example: Jesus [expletive] Christ), depiction of real sexual activities/unsimulated sex (e.g. actual penetration, actual ejaculation, actual oral sex, actual masturbation), themes that glorify undesirable and unnatural sexual activities (e.g. bestiality, paedophilia, etc.), content deemed to be exploitative or obscene in nature such as actual pornographic footage containing real sex acts, fetishes or practices which are offensive or abhorrent, explicit promotion and normalisation of homosexual lifestyle, explicit homosexual scenes, materials glorifying and encouraging drug and substance abuse, detailed and instructive depiction of illegal drug use, detailed or gratuitous depictions of extreme violence or cruelty and detailed instructions on methods of crime or killings.

The sale, possession, and exhibition of refused classification material is prohibited in Singapore.

Refused classification material was formerly denoted with the NAR rating.

=== Examples of movies given several controversies ===
Movies with "strong homosexual themes" are typically given R21 ratings regardless of other content in the film. The American films Milk, a 2008 biopic starring Sean Penn as gay rights activist Harvey Milk, and Brokeback Mountain, a 2005 romantic drama about two homosexual cowboys played by Heath Ledger and Jake Gyllenhaal, both received R21 rating for depictions of homosexual sexual activities. However, the 2018 film Love, Simon about a gay teenager coming to terms with his identity and finding out which of his classmates is his anonymous online pen pal was given an R21 classification despite having no depictions of sexual activity, because MDA determined that "the theme of homosexuality... forms the main narrative of the film."

Often this film classification system compels film distributors to create an alternate, cleaner version of the film to qualify for less restrictive ratings and suburban theatrical screenings for commercial reasons. For example, in 2007, distributor Focus Features released Lust, Caution (2007) in two versions: an edited NC16-rated version that was nine minutes shorter and another that was R21-rated and uncut. At the same time, the MDA allows for "some leeway during classification" for films with "limited screenings". For instance, in 2012, Cathay-Keris Films was told that Shame (2011) would receive an R21 rating for commercial release in mainstream cinemas only if a scene featuring group sex was edited. However, when the film was re-submitted for classification for the Singapore Film Society screening in 2013, the MDA gave it an R21 rating without edits.

Some local films have also encountered censorship difficulties with the MDA. In 2003, filmmaker Royston Tan's gangster-themed "15" (2003) suffered numerous cuts pertaining to national security concerns. In 2007, filmmaker Loo Zihan's homosexual-themed Solos (2007) was subjected to edits involving three scenes of graphic gay sex to meet R21 classification guidelines. In June 2012, the MDA revoked the M18 classification of Singaporean director Ken Kwek's Sex.Violence.FamilyValues (2012) and banned the film a day after its premiere after receiving complaints from Indians who alleged that the "Porn Masala" section of the film contained scenes which were offensive to Singapore's Indian community. The film's director and producers submitted an appeal to Singapore's government-appointed Films Appeal Committee, asking for the ban to be lifted. In January 2013, the Films Appeal Committee overturned the Board of Film Censors' decision and lifted the ban, giving it an R21 rating subject to edits by the filmmaker to a scene which contained particularly racially offensive dialogue.

The film The Wolf of Wall Street (2013) had to have an orgy and threesome scene, as well as religiously profane language edited to secure an R21 rating. Likewise, the French film Blue Is the Warmest Colour (2013) had to have an explicit and prolonged lesbian sex scene sequence considerably edited down to secure the R21 rating. The film Black Swan (2010) was passed with an M18 rating, but only after a mandatory cut was made for a graphic lesbian scene. In 2011, the Oscar-nominated drama The Kids Are All Right (2010) was given an R21 rating with the condition of a one-print theatrical release as the film was deemed to be "explicit in its portrayal of a lesbian family as a normal and acceptable lifestyle" which had exceeded the MDA's Films Classification Guidelines. The restriction served as a signal that the film had gone beyond community values in Singapore.

In September 2014, Singaporean filmmaker Tan Pin Pin's documentary about Communist Party of Malaya (CPM) political exiles, To Singapore, With Love (2013), received an NAR rating, with the MDA claiming that it undermined national security as "the individuals in the film have given distorted and untruthful accounts of how they came to leave Singapore and remain outside Singapore," and that "a number of these self-professed 'exiles' were members of, or had provided support to, the proscribed CPM."

The Yangtze Cinema, built in 1976, was probably the only theatre in Singapore where uncut softcore pornographic films were shown, it has closed its doors on 29 February 2016.

Benedetta was refused classification by the IMDA for insensitive portrayals of the Catholic Church, particularly a homosexual scene between two nuns.

=== Party political films ===
The controversial Section 33 of the Films Act originally banned the making, distribution and exhibition of "party political films", at pain of a fine not exceeding $100,000 or to imprisonment for a term not exceeding 2 years. The Act further defined a "party political film" as any film or video

(a) which is an advertisement made by or on behalf of any political party in Singapore or any body whose objects relate wholly or mainly to politics in Singapore, or any branch of such party or body; or
(b) which is made by any person and directed towards any political end in Singapore

Exceptions are, however, made for films "made solely for the purpose of reporting of current events", or informing or educating persons on the procedures and polling times of elections or referendums. In 2001 the short documentary called A Vision of Persistence on opposition politician J. B. Jeyaretnam was also banned for being a "party political film". The makers of the documentary, all lecturers at the Ngee Ann Polytechnic, later submitted written apologies and withdrew the documentary from being screened at the 2001 Singapore International Film Festival in April, having been told they could be charged in court. Another short documentary called Singapore Rebel by Martyn See, which documented Singapore Democratic Party leader Dr Chee Soon Juan's acts of civil disobedience, was banned from the 2005 Singapore International Film Festival on the same grounds and See is being investigated for possible violations of the Films Act. Channel NewsAsia's five-part documentary series on Singapore's PAP ministers in 2005 were not considered a party political film. The government response was that the programme was part of current affairs and thus does not contravene the Films Act. Since they do not concern the politics of Singapore, films that call out political beliefs of other countries, for example Michael Moore's Fahrenheit 9/11, are allowed. Since March 2009, the Films Act has been amended to allow party political films as long as they were deemed factual and objective by a consultative committee. Some months later, this committee lifted the ban on Singapore Rebel.

== Print media ==
=== Local press ===
The local papers ... are essentially organs of the state, instruments of only the most desirable propagation.

— William Gibson, "Disneyland with the Death Penalty", Wired issue 1.04, September 1993.

Singapore's history of a censored local press begins even before its independence. In 1824, Francis Bernard, whom Stamford Raffles appointed Chief of Police and Master Attendant, founded Singapore's premier newspaper, the Singapore Chronicle. In an astoundingly foreshadowing manner that would symbolize the island's relationship to censorship for centuries to come, a legislative stipulation called "the Gagging Act" mandated that each newspaper had to be submitted to Governor Raffles for review before publication. In 1835 the Gagging Act was abolished, coinciding with the founding of new newspaper called the Free Press.

With the sole exception of MediaCorp's daily freesheet Today, all daily newspapers including the flagship Straits Times are printed by SPH Media Trust, whose management shareholders are appointed by the government in accordance with the Newspaper and Printing Presses Act of 1974. While current shareholding structure does not imply direct governmental control on media content, their active presence promotes self-censorship amongst journalists. In 2008, Reporters without Borders ranked Singapore as 144th out of 173 surveyed countries in terms of freedom of the press. The Singapore government said it is not ashamed of its low rank for press freedom because it has achieved top ratings for economic freedom and prosperity. Instead of subscribing to the Western press model, it believes that a non-adversarial press can report accurately and objectively. A recent Gallup poll found that 69% of Singaporeans trusted their media.

On 30 June 2006 blogger mrbrown wrote an article, titled "TODAY: S'poreans are fed, up with progress!", for his weekly opinion column in Today newspaper concerning the rising income gap and costs of living in Singapore. Three days later, on 3 July, an official from the Ministry of Information, Communications and the Arts published a response letter on the same newspaper calling mrbrown a "partisan player" whose views "distort the truth". On 6 July, the newspaper suspended his column. Fellow blogger Mr Miyagi subsequently resigned from his column for Today. This was followed by Today newspaper chief executive and editor-in-chief Mano Sabnani's resignation in November 2006. The action fuelled anger over the Internet due to the perceived heavy-handedness action taken by the government over criticisms.

=== Foreign publications ===
The MDA requires importers to "ensure that the publications/ audio materials brought in for distribution do not feature content which could be considered objectionable on moral, racial or religious grounds, or deemed detrimental to Singapore's national interests". According to the MDA, more than 2 million publications and 300,000 audio materials are imported into Singapore each year under the Registered Importers Scheme. Foreign publications that carry articles the government considers slanderous, including The Economist and the Far Eastern Economic Review (FEER), have been subjected to defamation suits and/or had their circulations "gazetted" (restricted). The sale of Malaysian newspapers in Singapore is prohibited; a similar ban on the sale of newspapers from Singapore applies in Malaysia.

In August 2006 the government announced a tightening of rules on foreign publications previously exempt from the media code. Newsweek, Time, the Financial Times, the Far Eastern Economic Review and the International Herald Tribune will be required to appoint a publisher's representative in Singapore who could be sued, and to pay a security deposit of S$200,000. The move comes after FEER published an interview with Singaporean opposition leader Chee Soon Juan, who claimed that leading members of the Singaporean government had "skeletons in their closets". On 28 September 2006, FEER was banned briefly for failing to comply with conditions imposed under the Newspaper and Printing Presses Act.

Pornography is strictly prohibited in Singapore; this encompasses magazines such as Playboy or Penthouse. However, magazines which are deemed non-pornographic and classified under "Adult Interest Magazines" such as Cosmopolitan are free to be distributed at all stores with a "Unsuitable For The Young" label on its cover.

In December 2008 a Singaporean couple was charged with sedition for distributing the Chick tracts The Little Bride and Who Is Allah?, said "to promote feelings of ill-will and hostility between Christians and Muslims in Singapore".

== Television ==
Singapore's state investment arm, Temasek Holdings, is the parent organisation of Mediacorp which comprises all free-to-air terrestrial local TV channels licensed to broadcast in Singapore, as well as 12 radio stations. In July 2011, Singapore relaxed the Subscription Television Programme Code guidelines allowing Pay TV operators to screen up to M18-rated content programmes containing more graphic content (e.g. sex scenes/nudity, graphic violence, strong language) and mature or sensitive subject matter relating to political issues, racial/religious issues and homosexuality. R21-rated content was still restricted to only Pay TV Video-on-Demand (VOD) services. In July 2016, the IMDA officially greenlit R21-rated content for Over-the-Top (OTT) services. However, the English language Pay-TV channels currently available for scheduled broadcast in Singapore comprises only Asian regional channels such as Fox Channel Asia, Star World and WarnerTV, which are outside the editorial control of the Info-communications Media Development Authority (IMDA) as they operate on a regional scale and the same standard of censorship is carried out across the entire region because these channels have to conform with laws from the more conservative areas in Asia, meaning most territories in Asia watch the same censored version. At the moment, only Singapore-owned Video-On-Demand services offer English language programmes that can be regulated by the IMDA and therefore, passed uncut under classification ratings such as NC16, M18 and R21. The popular HBO series Sex and the City was pulled from broadcast originally in the late 1990s when the series debuted but the ban was later lifted after an earlier relaxation of guidelines in the Subscription Television Programme Code in 2004. Private ownership of satellite dishes is illegal, though international TV news broadcasts (such as CNN International, BBC World News, Fox News Channel, and RT) are available on services such as Starhub TV and SingTel IPTV Singtel TV.

The Info-communications Media Development Authority (IMDA), through its four Programme Advisory Committees (PACs) for each of the four official languages, monitors and provides feedback on broadcast content. Permissible content on free-to-air Singaporean TV is regulated by the IMDA's Free-to-Air Television Programme Code. The Free-to-Air Television Programme Code states that "all programmes broadcast between 6 am and 10 pm must be generally acceptable for family audiences. The transition from family-oriented to more adult programming after the watershed time of 10 pm should also be executed gradually" Hence, locally produced dramas aired before 10pm tend to be more family-based, with crime-horror-thrillers; etc. at a minimum. PG13 content, which is allowed only after 10 pm to 6 am, is the maximum rating available for free-to-air television in Singapore. NC16 and M18-rated content are available only on Pay TV channels under the editorial control of the IMDA such as Singapore channels E City and VV Drama, both of which owned by Starhub. In February 2008, the Academy Awards acceptance speech for the short documentary Freeheld was censored by Mediacorp in the rebroadcast of the program due to the filmmakers' mention of equal rights for same-sex couples as it violated the Free-to-air TV Programme Code.

Part 13.3 of the Code states that use of Singlish "should not be encouraged and can only be permitted in interviews, where the interviewee speaks only Singlish." The popular Singlish sitcom Phua Chu Kang was singled out in the 1999 National Day rally speech. The Programmes Advisory Committee for English TV and Radio Programmes also singled out the use of Singlish in local sitcoms in its 2005 annual report, saying they "contain excessive Singlish" and "this should be avoided as it could give the wrong impression, especially among the young, that Singlish is the standard of spoken English in Singapore".

Part 13.4 of the Code states that "All Chinese programmes, except operas or other programmes specifically approved by the Authority, must be generally in Mandarin." Dialects in dialogues and songs may be allowed provided the context justifies usage and is sparingly used. More leeway of dialects is given for Pay TV channels. Collaborations between Mediacorp and the Ministry of Communications and Information for conveying government policies such as Eat Already? and Happy Can Already! featured dialects to explain the policies to older Chinese Singaporeans.

== Radio ==
Similar to television, dialects in dialogues and songs may be allowed provided the context justifies usage and is sparingly used. Mediacorp's radio station, Capital 958, broadcast daily morning news bulletins in dialects such as Cantonese, Hokkien, Teochew, Hainanese, Foochow and Hakka.

== Freedom of press ==
As of 2022 Singapore is rated at 139 of 180 on the Press Freedom Index and labeled as "partly free" on the Freedom of the Press report. MediaCorp, owned by state investment arm Temasek Holdings, with 7 television channels and 14 radio channels, is by far the largest media provider and the only television broadcaster. SPH Media Trust has a monopoly over the print media. This, combined with the Infocomm Media Development Authority's ability to regulate all media, led the press to adapt a non-adversarial approach to reporting instead of facing defamation lawsuits.

Overseas media have faced warnings, defamation suits, and contempt of court proceedings filed by Singaporean officials in the local courts, including the International Herald Tribune, Economist, Financial Times, The Wall Street Journal, Bloomberg and the Far Eastern Economic Review. Journalists and human rights groups have commented that the apologies were made to preserve the distribution system and editorial access of their media in the Singaporean market.

In 2014, a new regulatory framework for online news websites came into effect. Online content providers must apply for a licence if they:

1. report an average of at least one article per week on Singapore news and current affairs over a period of two months, and
2. are visited by at least 50,000 unique IP addresses from Singapore each month over the same period of two months

These sites must also put up a performance bond of $50,000, and individual licenses have to be renewed on a yearly basis. Registered sites are expected to remove content that is in breach of MDA standards within 24 hours, if their content is considered by IMDA as being against the public interest, public security, or national harmony. The move was widely seen as a way of tightening control over non-traditional news reporting and socio-political websites before the 2015 general elections.

=== Protection from Online Falsehoods and Manipulation Act ===
The Protection from Online Falsehoods and Manipulation Act, (POFMA) and known colloquially as Fake News Law, is a statute of the Parliament of Singapore that enables authorities to tackle the spread of fake news or false information. The law is designed specifically to allow authorities to respond to fake news or false information through a graduated process of enforcing links to fact-checking statements, censorship of website or assets on social media platforms, and criminal charges. The law is controversial and has received criticism both locally and internationally by opposition politicians, human rights groups, journalists and academics, and is thought to further add on to the stringent laws in Singapore.

== See also ==
- Restrictions on freedom of speech and assembly
- Public demonstrations in Singapore
- Human rights in Singapore
- OB marker
