= Disneyland with the Death Penalty =

1993 magazine article by William Gibson

Cover of Wired issue 1.4, where the article debuted

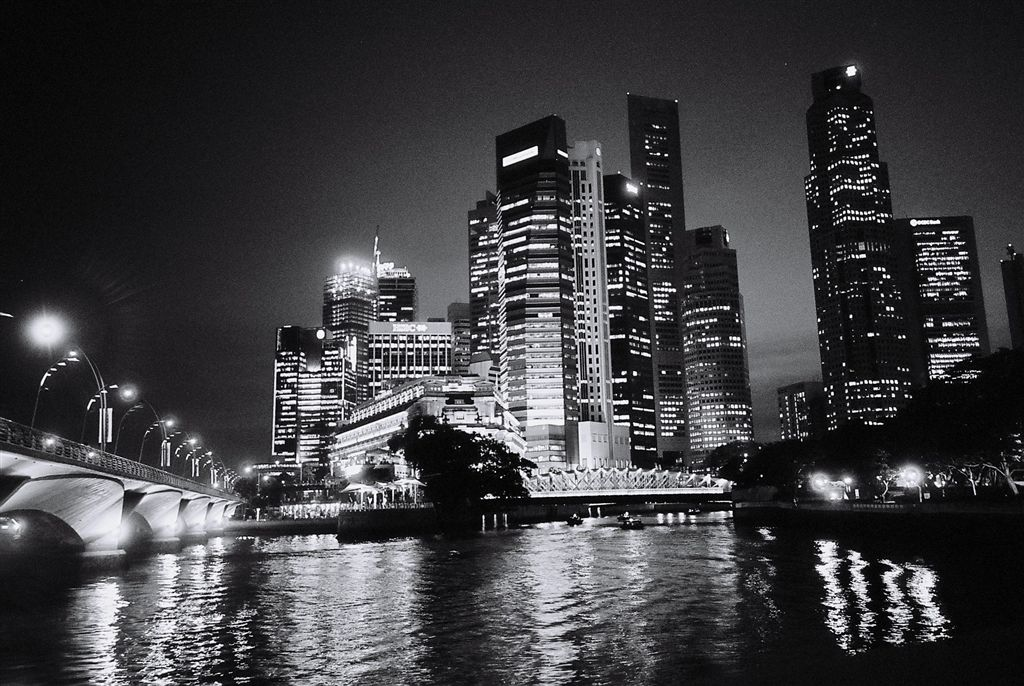
Nightscape of Singapore

"Disneyland with the Death Penalty" is a 4,500-word article about Singapore written by William Gibson. His first major piece of non-fiction, it was first published as the cover story for Wired magazine's September/October 1993 issue (1.4).

The article followed Gibson's observations of the architecture, phenomenology and culture of Singapore, and the clean, bland and conformist impression the city-state conveyed during his stay. Its title and central metaphor – Singapore as Disneyland with the death penalty – was a reference to the authoritarian artifice the author perceived the city-state to be. Singapore, Gibson detailed, was lacking any sense of creativity or authenticity, absent of any indication of its history or underground culture. He found the government to be pervasive, corpocratic and technocratic, and the judicial system rigid and draconian. Singaporeans were characterized as consumerists of insipid taste. The article was accentuated by local news reports of criminal trials by which the author illustrated his observations, and bracketed by contrasting descriptions of the Southeast Asian airports he arrived and left by.

Though Gibson's first major piece of non-fiction, the article had an immediate and lasting impact. The Singaporean government banned Wired upon the publication of the issue. The phrase "Disneyland with the death penalty" came to stand internationally for an authoritarian and austere reputation that the city-state found difficult to shake off.

== Synopsis ==
There is no slack in Singapore. Imagine an Asian version of Zurich operating as an offshore capsule at the foot of Malaysia; an affluent microcosm whose citizens inhabit something that feels like, well, Disneyland. Disneyland with the death penalty.

— Gibson, William. "Disneyland with the Death Penalty"

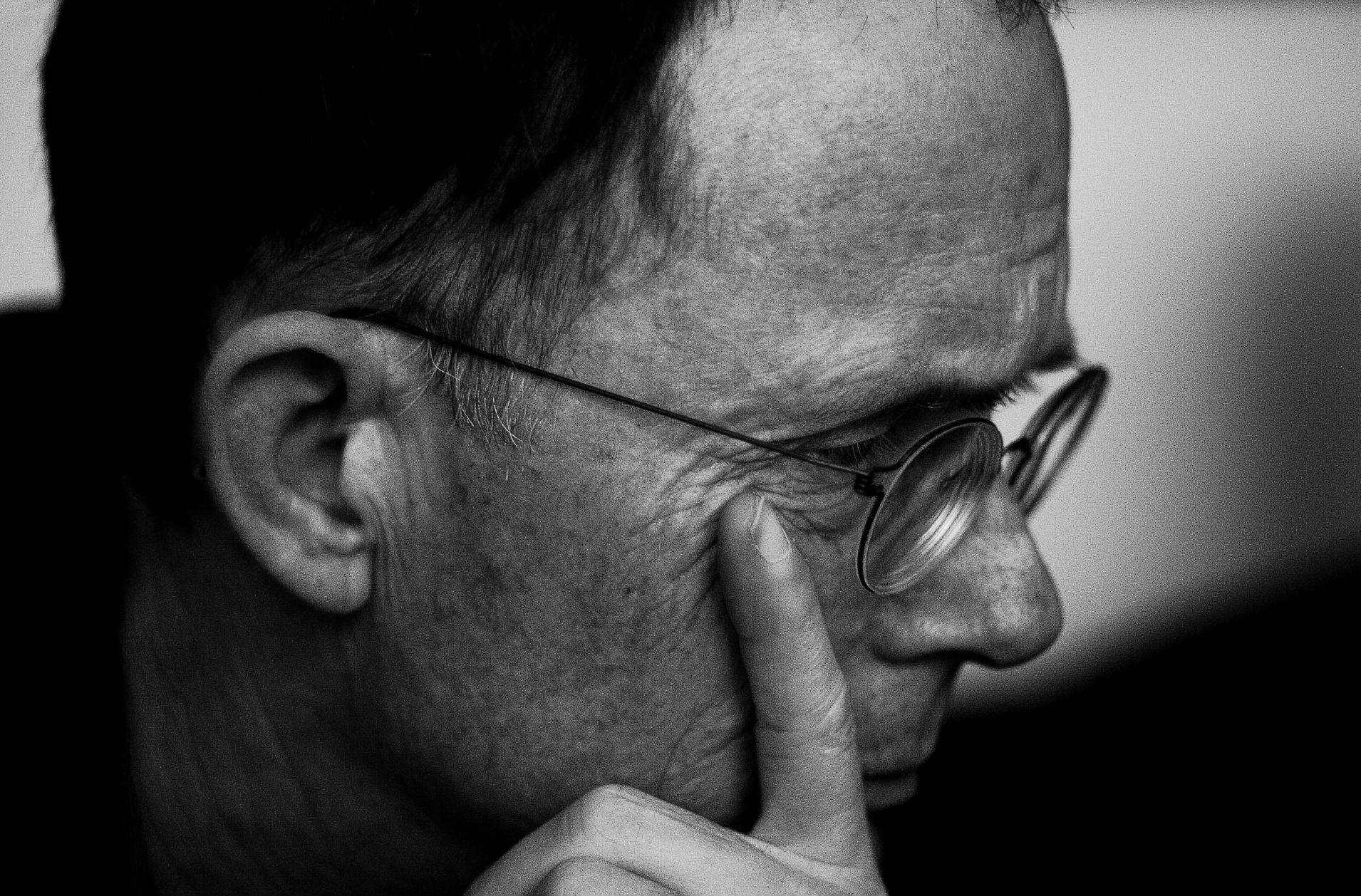
William Gibson

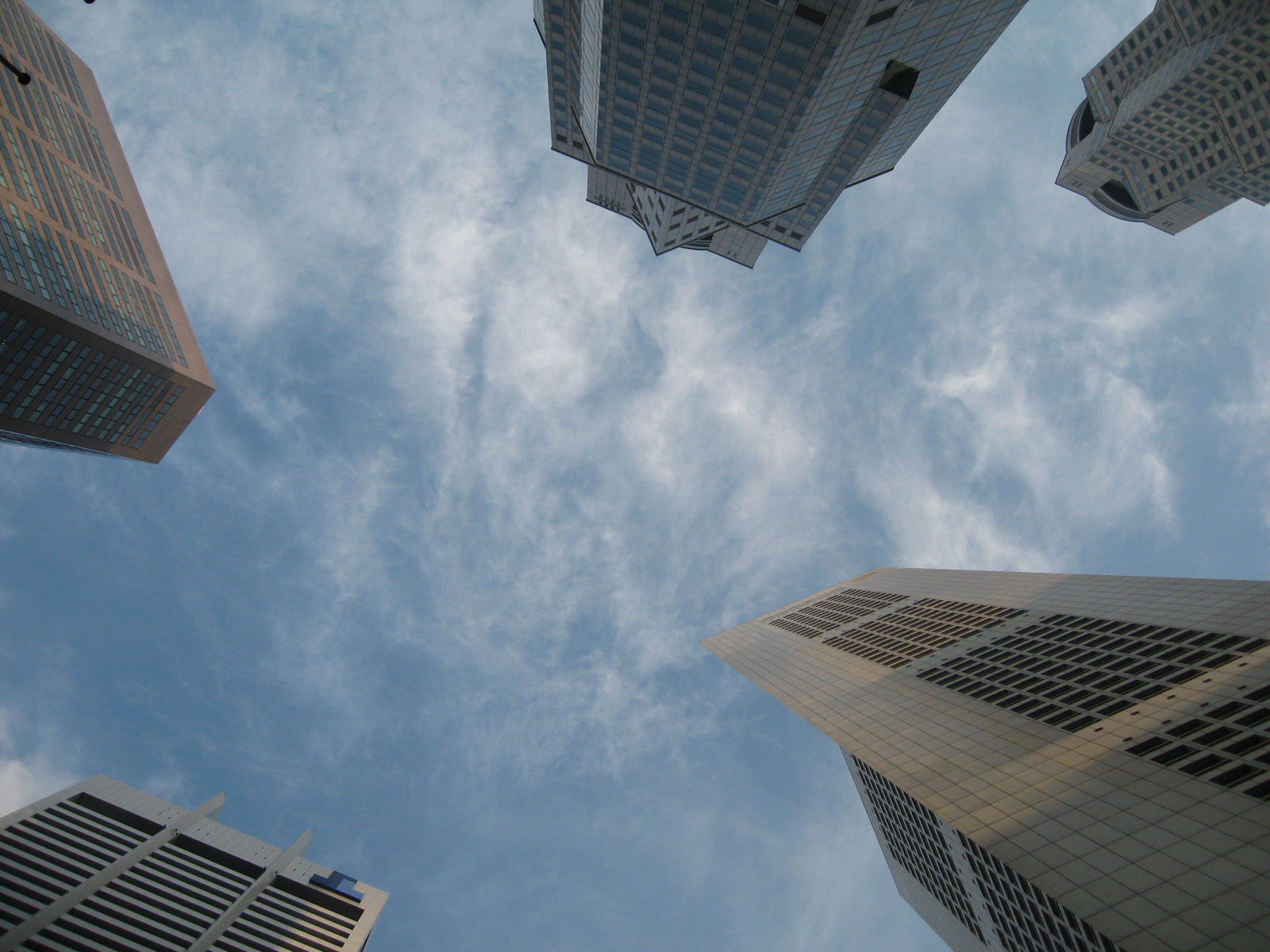
Skyscrapers in Raffles Place in the Central Business District

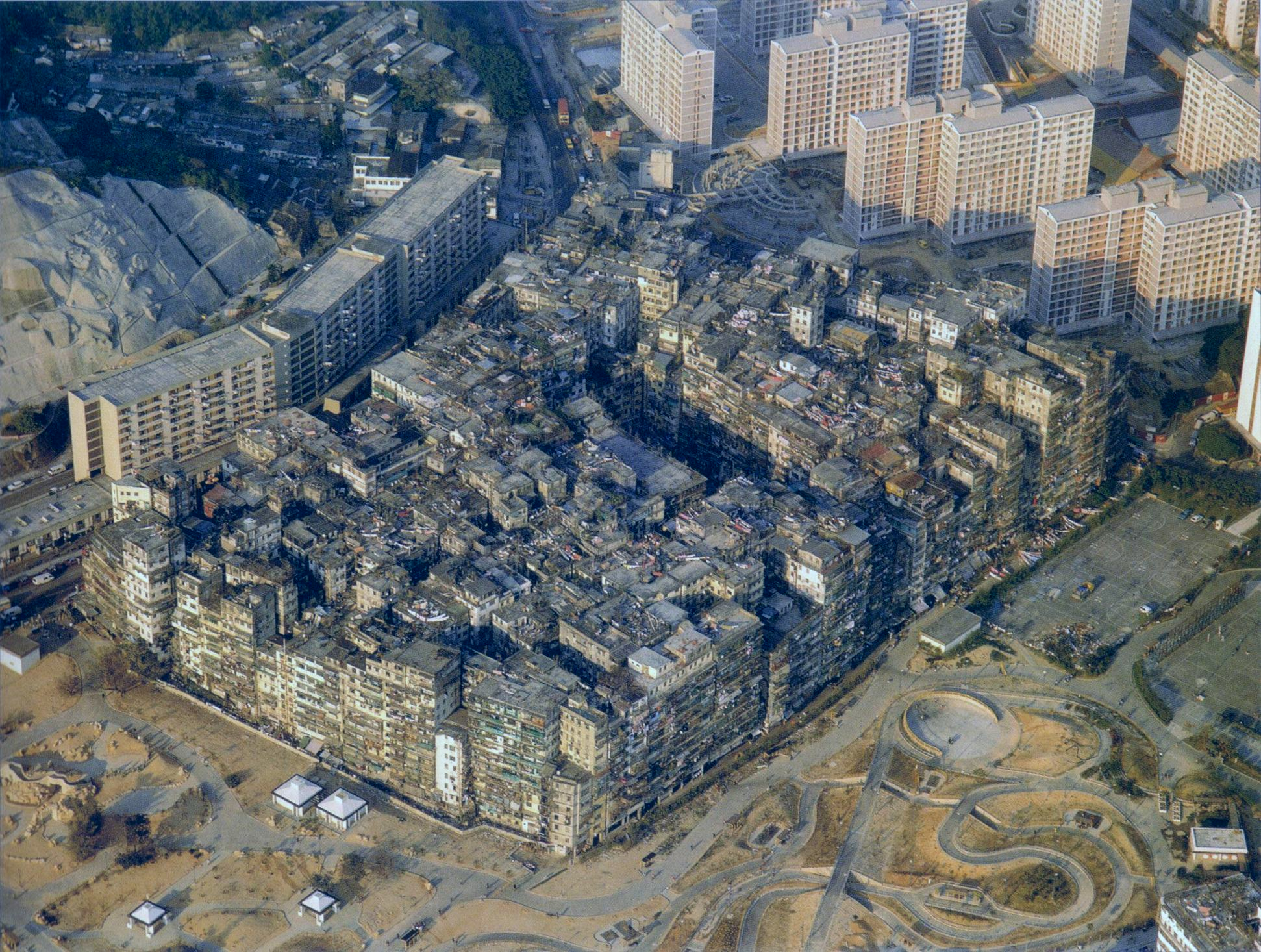
An aerial shot from 1989 of the squat enclave Kowloon Walled City, which Gibson contrasts favourably with Singapore

The title "Disneyland with the Death Penalty" referred to the subject of the article, the Southeast Asian city-state of Singapore, whose strictly guarded sterility Gibson described with horror. After opening the article with the Disneyland metaphor, Gibson cited an observation attributed to Laurie Anderson that virtual reality "would never look real until they learned how to put some dirt in it" in relation to the immaculate state of Changi Airport, Singapore's international airport. Beyond the airport, he noted that the natural environment had been cultivated into "all-too-perfect examples of itself", such as with the abundance of golf courses. Singaporean society was a "relentlessly G-rated experience", controlled by a government akin to a megacorporation, fixated on conformity and behavioural constraint and with a marked lack of humour and creativity.

Gibson found it painful to try to connect with the Victorian Singapore, of which few vestiges remained. In an attempt to uncover Singapore's underlying social mechanisms, the author searched fruitlessly for an urban underbelly, rising at dawn for jetlagged walks on several mornings only to discover that the city-state's "physical past ... has almost entirely vanished". He gave an overview of the history of Singapore from the founding of modern Singapore by Sir Stamford Raffles in 1819 to the Japanese occupation and the establishment of the Republic in 1965. He concluded that modern Singapore, effectively a one-party state and capitalist technocracy, was a product first and foremost of the vision of three-decade Prime Minister Lee Kuan Yew. As an aside, he quoted a headline from the South China Morning Post detailing the trial of a cadre of economists, a government official (current President Tharman Shanmugaratnam) and a newspaper editor for divulging a state secret by revealing the Singaporean economic growth rate.

Gibson deplored the absence of an authentic metropolitan feeling, something which he blamed for the "telling lack of creativity". He gave a psychogeographic account of the architecture of the city-state, noting the endless parade of young, attractive and generically attired middle class through the host of shopping centers, and comparing the city-state to the convention district of Atlanta, Georgia. He found the selection in music stores and bookshops unrelentingly bland, musing whether this is partially attributable to the efforts of the Undesirable Propagation Unit (UPU), one of several state censorship agencies. Amidst the near-total absence of bohemianism and counterculture, Gibson found no trace of dissidence, an underground, or slums. In the place of a sex trade, the author finds government-sanctioned "health centers" – in fact massage parlours – and mandatory dating organized and enforced by government agencies. "[T]here is remarkably little", he wrote of the city-state, "that is not the result of deliberate and no doubt carefully deliberated social policy."

The creative deficit of the city-state was evident to the author also in the Singaporeans' obsession with consumerism as a pastime, the homogeneity of the retailers and their fare. On a more positive note, Gibson wrote effusively of the diverse array of local food (he found it "fairly difficult" to complain about), and of Singaporeans' passion for dining. It was, he remarked, "something to write home about". He returned then to the theme of the staid insipidity of the city-state, observing the unsettling cleanliness of the physical environment and the self-policing of the populace. In detailing Singaporean technological advancement and aspirations as an information economy, Gibson cast doubt on the resilience of their controlled and conservative nature in the face of impending mass exposure to digital culture — in his words, "the wilds of X-rated cyberspace". "Perhaps", he speculated, "Singapore's destiny will be to become nothing more than a smug, neo-Swiss enclave of order and prosperity, amid a sea of unthinkable ... weirdness."

Toward the end of the essay, Gibson briefly covered two applications of the death penalty by the Singaporean justice system; he excerpted a report from The Straits Times about Mat Repin Mamat, a Malay man sentenced to death for attempting to smuggle one kilogram (2.2 lb) of cannabis into the city-state, and followed this with a description of the case of Johannes van Damme, a Dutch engineer found with significant quantities of heroin with the same consequence. He expressed reservations about the justice of capital punishment and described the Singaporeans as the true bearers of zero tolerance. After hearing the announcement of van Damme's sentencing, Gibson decided to leave, checked out "in record time" from the hotel, and caught a cab to the airport. The trip was conspicuous for the absence of police along the road, but there was an abundance of them at the Changi Airtropolis, where Gibson photographed a discarded piece of crumpled paper, incurring their ire. Flying into Hong Kong he briefly glimpsed the soon-to-be-destroyed shantytown Kowloon Walled City at the end of one of the runways at the chaotic Kai Tak Airport, and mused about the contrast with the staid and sanitized city-state he had left behind. The essay ended with the declaration "I loosened my tie, clearing Singapore airspace."

== Impact and legacy ==
The Singapore government responded to the publication of the article by banning Wired from the country. The phrase "Disneyland with the death penalty" became a famous and widely referenced description for the nation, adopted in particular by opponents of Singapore's perceived authoritarian nature. The city-state's authoritarian and austere reputation made it difficult to shake the description off; Creative Review hailed it as "famously damning", while The New York Times associate editor R. W. Apple Jr. defended the city-state in a 2003 piece as "hardly deserving of William Gibson's woundingly dismissive tag line".

Reviewing the work in a 2003 blog post, Gibson wrote:

That Wired article may have managed to convey the now-cliched sense of Singapore as a creepy, anal-retentive city-state, but it didn't go nearly far enough in capturing the sheer underlying dullness of the place. It's a terrible *retail* environment. The endless malls are filled with shops selling exactly the same products, and it's all either the stuff that kicks Cayce into anaphylactic shock or slightly sad local-industry imitations of same. You could easily put together a smarter outfit shopping exclusively in Heathrow.

In 2009, John Kampfner observed that the phrase "Disneyland with the death penalty" was still being "cited by detractors of Singapore as a good summary of its human rights record and by supporters of the country as an example of foreign high-handedness." "Disneyland with the Death Penalty" was assigned as reading on the topic of "Singaporean progress" for a 2008 National University of Singapore Writing & Critical Thinking course. The piece was included in a 2012 compilation of Gibson's non-fiction writing, Distrust That Particular Flavor.

In a 2017 episode of Anthony Bourdain: Parts Unknown, filmed in Singapore, Bourdain told a group of native Singaporeans that many Americans might think of the city as "Disneyland with a death penalty". Bourdain also referenced Gibson’s essay in a written summary of the episode.

== Critical reception ==
The article provoked a strong critical reaction. The Boston Globe characterized it as a "biting piece on the technocratic state in Singapore". It was recommended by postmodern political geographer Edward Soja as "a wonderful tour of the cyberspatial urbanities" of the city-state. Journalist Steven Poole called it a "horrified report", and argued that it showed that the author "despises the seamless, strictured planes of corporate big business" and is "the champion of the interstitial". In a review of Gibson's 2010 novel Zero History for The Observer James Purdon identified "Disneyland" as one of the high points of Gibson's career, "a witty, perceptive piece of reportage, hinting at a non-fiction talent equal to the vision that had elevated Gibson to digital-age guru".

Philosopher and technology writer Peter Ludlow interpreted the piece as an attack on the city, and noted as ironic the fact that the real Disneyland was in California—a state whose "repressive penal code includes the death penalty". Urban theorist Maarten Delbeke noted that Gibson cited the computerized control of the city-state as responsible for its sanitized inauthentic character, a claim Delbeke called "a conventional, almost old-fashioned complaint against technocracy". In a 2004 article in Forum on Contemporary Art & Society, Paul Rae commented that "[w]hile an ability to capture the zeitgeist is to be taken seriously in a context such as this one, Gibson's journalistic reportage is inevitably unrefined", and cited the accusation of Singapore-based British academic John Phillips that Gibson "fails to really think [his critiques] through".

In S,M,L,XL (1995), urbanist and architectural theorist Rem Koolhaas took issue with the acerbic, ironic tone of the article, condemning it as a typical reaction by "dead parents deploring the mess [their] children have made of their inheritance". Koolhaas argued that reactions like Gibson's imply that the positive legacy of modernity can only be intelligently used by Westerners, and that attempts such as Singapore's at embracing the "newness" of modernity without understanding its history would result in a far-reaching and deplorable eradication.

== See also ==
- Technocracy
- Asian values
- Commodity fetishism
- Paternalism
- Postmodernity
- Simulacra and Simulation
- Urban planning in Singapore
- Capital punishment in Singapore
- Caning in Singapore
