= Distrust That Particular Flavor =

2012 nonfiction book by William Gibson

- U.S. first edition cover
- Author: William Gibson
- Language: English
- Genre: Non-fiction anthology
- Publisher: Putnam Adult
- Publication date: January 3, 2012
- Media type: Print (hardcover and paperback), audiobook
- Pages: 272
- ISBN: 978-0-399-15843-8
- OCLC: 765968892

Distrust That Particular Flavor is a collection of non-fiction essays by American author William Gibson, better known for his speculative and science fiction novels.

Distrust consists of twenty-six pieces written over a period of more than twenty years. The anthology includes a range of formats, including essays, magazine pieces, album reviews, and forewords from other published works.

The book won the Locus Award for Best Non-fiction in 2013.

== Background ==
Since making a name for himself as a leading figure in the cyberpunk genre with his Sprawl trilogy of novels, Gibson has been primarily known as a writer of science or speculative fiction. However, beginning in the late eighties, he has regularly penned non-fiction pieces for various publications. Gibson credits his agent for the idea of a collection; according to the writer, the book was intended to bridge the gap between Zero History (2010), his then-most recent novel, and his next work of fiction.

== Content ==
The pieces in Distrust That Particular Flavor were written between the late 1980s and 2010. Some were originally published as magazine articles in Time, Rolling Stone, and Wired. Some appeared as forewords to books by other authors. Several speeches appear in written form for the first time.

In "Disneyland with the Death Penalty", which originally appeared in a 1993 issue of Wired, Gibson reflects on the state of Singapore. Criticisms in the article resulted in the Singapore government banning Wired from the country. The essay "Rocket Radio", which appeared in Rolling Stone, covers the evolution of communications from the crystal radio to the Internet. Written in the late 1980s, it features Gibson theorizing on the future of the then-nascent Net. "Dead Man Sings" takes a more autobiographical note; memories of his childhood are interspersed with an exploration of visual and audio media, and their effect on time. The writer delves into psychogeography in his review of Peter Ackroyd's London: The Biography, entitled "Metrophagy: the Art and Science of Digesting Cities". Several pieces cover music and fine arts. "Any 'Mount of World" is a review of a Steely Dan live album. Gibson is a fan of the group. "Introduction: The Body" looks at the Australian-Cypriot performance artist Stelarc. The collection features Gibson's writings on three of his favourite authors, Jorge Luis Borges, George Orwell and H.G. Wells. The writer's various obsessions feature in other pieces, such as vintage watches (pursued through eBay) and his interest in classic denim.

== List of contents ==
- "Introduction: African Thumb Piano" – not previously published
- "Rocket Radio" – first published in Rolling Stone, June 15, 1989
- "Since 1948" – WilliamGibsonBooks.com, November 6, 2002
- "Any ’Mount of World" – Addicted to Noise, March 2000
- "The Baddest Dude on Earth" – Time International, April 29, 2002
- "Talk for Book Expo, New York" – not previously published
- "Dead Man Sings" – Forbes ASAP, November 30, 1998, supp.: 177
- "Up the Line" – not previously published
- "Disneyland with the Death Penalty" – Wired, issue 1.04, September 1993
- "Mr. Buk’s Window" – National Post, September 20, 2001
- "Shiny Balls of Mud: Hikaru Dorodango and Tokyu Hands" – Tate Magazine, issue 1, September/October 2002
- "An Invitation" – foreword to Labyrinths: Selected Stories and Other Writings (2007), Jorge Luis Borges, New Directions Press
- "Metrophagy: The Art and Science of Digesting Great Cities" – Whole Earth Catalog, Summer 2001.
- "Modern Boys and Mobile Girls" – The Observer, April 1, 2001.
- "My Obsession" – Wired, issue 7.01, January 1999
- "My Own Private Tokyo" – Wired, issue 9.09, September 2001
- "The Road to Oceania" – The New York Times, June 25, 2006
- "Skip Spence’s Jeans" – Ugly Things, issue 21, 2003
- "Terminal City" – introduction to Phantom Shanghai (2007), Greg Girard
- "Introduction: "The Body"" – foreword to Stelarc: The Monograph (2005), Marquard Smith, MIT Press
- "The Net Is a Waste of Time" – The New York Times Magazine, July 14, 1996, page 31
- "Time Machine Cuba" – Infinite Matrix, January 23, 2006
- "Will We Have Computer Chips in Our Heads?" – Time, June 19, 2000
- "William Gibson's Filmless Festival" – Wired, issue 7.10, September 1999
- "Johnny: Notes on a Process" – Wired, issue 3.06, July 1995
- "Googling the Cyborg" – Talk for the Vancouver Institute, February, 2008
