= Article 14 of the Constitution of Singapore =

Guarantee of the freedom of speech

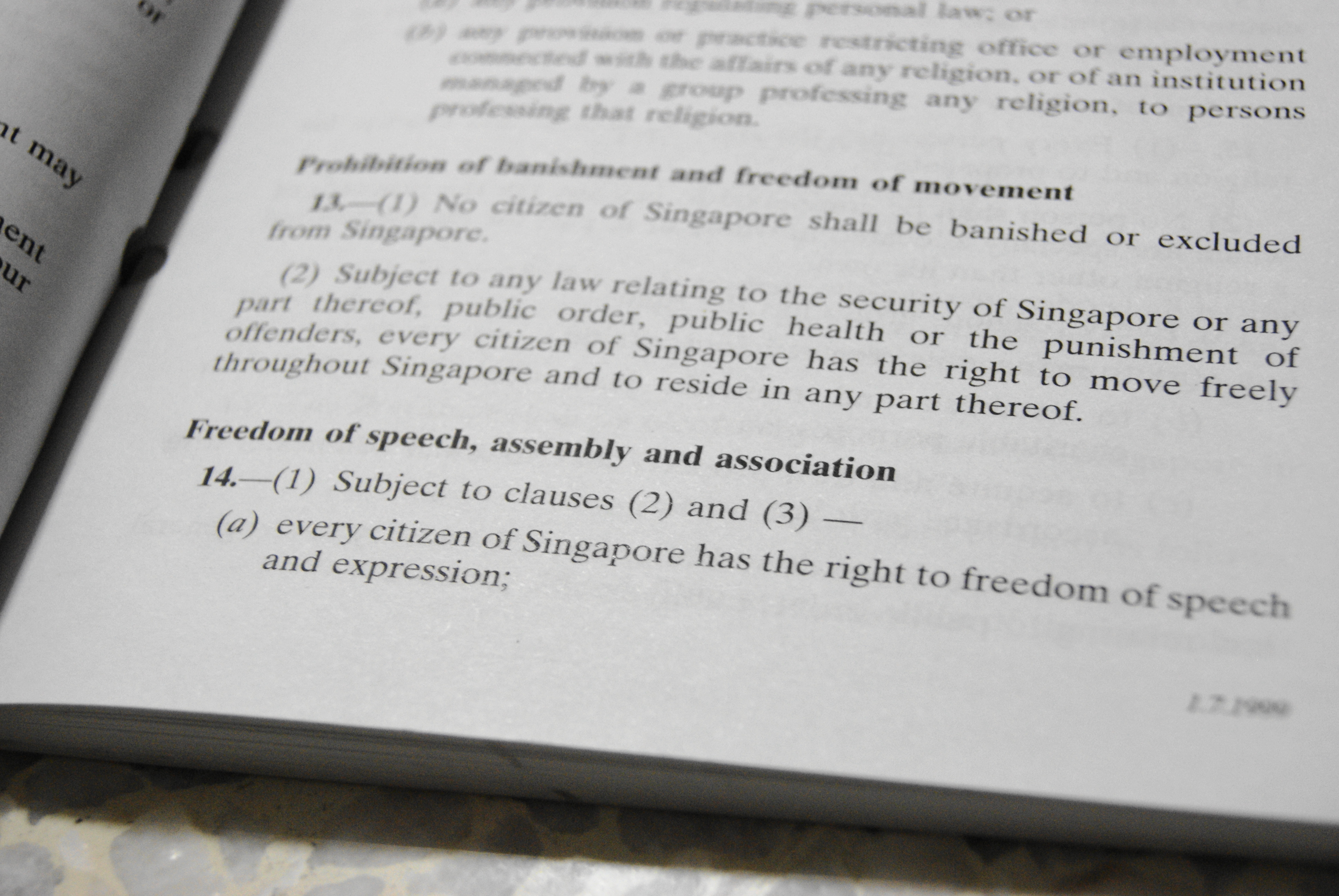
Article 14 of the Constitution of Singapore guarantees the rights to freedom and expression, peaceful assembly without arms and association, although these rights are not absolute.

Article 14 of the Constitution of the Republic of Singapore, specifically Article 14(1), guarantees to Singapore citizens the rights to freedom of speech and expression, association, and peaceful assembly without arms. However, the enjoyment of these rights may be restricted by laws imposed by the Parliament of Singapore on the grounds stated in Article 14(2) of the Constitution.

There are two types of grounds. For the first type, it must be shown that restricting the rights is "necessary or expedient in the interest" of the grounds. The grounds are the security of Singapore and public order (applicable to all three rights protected by Article 14(1)), morality (freedom of speech and freedom of association), and friendly relations with other countries (freedom of speech only). In a 2005 judgement, the High Court expressed the view that the phrase necessary or expedient confers upon Parliament "an extremely wide discretionary power and remit that permits a multifarious and multifaceted approach towards achieving any of the purposes specified in Art 14(2) of the Constitution". It is unnecessary for the courts to determine whether a legislative restriction of a right is reasonable. All that is required is a nexus between the objective underlying the restrictive law and one of the grounds specified in Article 14(2) that Parliament is entitled to restrict the right on.

The right to free speech is limited on the ground of the security of Singapore by the Official Secrets Act (Cap. 213, 1985 Rev. Ed.), and on the ground of public order by the Broadcasting Act (Cap. 28, 2003 Rev. Ed.) and Newspaper and Printing Presses Act (Cap. 206, 2002 Rev. Ed.). Public order also justifies restrictions on both free speech and assembly imposed by the Sedition Act (Cap. 290, 1985 Rev. Ed.), Public Entertainments and Meetings Act (Cap. 257, 2001 Rev. Ed.) and Public Order Act (Cap. 257A, 2012 Rev. Ed.); and restrictions on the right to freedom of association imposed by the Societies Act (Cap. 311, 1985 Rev. Ed.). Freedom of speech has also been limited on the basis of morality by the Films Act (Cap. 107, 1998 Rev. Ed.), which establishes film censorship and classification regimes; and the Undesirable Publications Act (Cap. 338, 1998 Rev. Ed.), under which obscene or otherwise objectionable publications may be banned.

No necessity or expedience requirement applies to the second type of grounds, which appear in Articles 14(2)(a) (restrictions "designed to protect the privileges of Parliament or to provide against contempt of court, defamation or incitement to any offence") and 14(3) (laws relating to labour or education). At present, it appears that Parliament may restrict Article 14(1) rights on these grounds simply by enacting legislation, and that the courts are not entitled to assess if the restrictions are appropriate. The privileges of Parliament are set out in the Parliament (Privileges, Immunities and Powers) Act (Cap. 217, 2000 Rev. Ed.), and the Singapore courts have held that the common law offence of scandalizing the court (a form of contempt of court) does not violate Article 14(1)(a). The courts have also determined that the traditional common law rules of the tort of defamation strike a proper balance between free speech and the protection of reputation, and have declined to apply a public figure doctrine or responsible journalism as additional defences to the tort.

== Text of Article 14 ==
Article 14(1) of the Constitution of the Republic of Singapore was designed to protect the rights to freedom of speech and expression, peaceful assembly without arms, and association. It is subject to Article 14(2) which qualifies these rights. Judicial and statutory limits have been read into the Article, a process which is deemed necessary because the rights to free speech, assembly and association do not exist in a vacuum but jostle with competing interests and counter-values. As was said in Chee Siok Chin v. Ministry of Home Affairs (2005), "[f]reedom of action invariably ends where conflicting rights and/or interests collide".

The text of Article 14, which is entitled "Freedom of speech, assembly and association", is as follows:

14.— (1) Subject to clauses (2) and (3) —

(a) every citizen of Singapore has the right to freedom of speech and expression;
(b) all citizens of Singapore have the right to assemble peaceably and without arms; and
(c) all citizens of Singapore have the right to form associations.

(2) Parliament may by law impose —

(a) on the rights conferred by clause (1)(a), such restrictions as it considers necessary or expedient in the interest of the security of Singapore or any part thereof, friendly relations with other countries, public order or morality and restrictions designed to protect the privileges of Parliament or to provide against contempt of court, defamation or incitement to any offence;
(b) on the right conferred by clause (1)(b), such restrictions as it considers necessary or expedient in the interest of the security of Singapore or any part thereof or public order; and
(c) on the right conferred by clause (1)(c), such restrictions as it considers necessary or expedient in the interest of the security of Singapore or any part thereof, public order or morality.

(3) Restrictions on the right to form associations conferred by clause (1)(c) may also be imposed by any law relating to labour or education.

Articles 14(1) to (3) are in pari materia with Articles 10(1) to (3) of the Constitution of Malaysia, from which they were adopted following Singapore's independence from Malaysia in 1965. Articles 14(1) and (2) are also somewhat similar to Articles 19(1) to (4) of the Constitution of India.

There is no constitutional right to bear arms in Singapore, as Article 14(1)(b) provides Singapore citizens with "the right to assemble peaceably and without arms". Under the Arms and Explosives Act, no person may possess, import, export, manufacture or deal in any arms or explosives without a licence. It may be that the words and without arms were included in Article 14(1)(b) to ensure that arguments based on the clause in the English Bill of Rights 1689 stating that "the Subjects which are Protestants may have Arms for their Defence suitable to their Conditions and as allowed by Law", which inspired the Second Amendment to the United States Constitution ("A well regulated Militia, being necessary to the security of a free State, the right of the people to keep and bear Arms, shall not be infringed."), cannot be raised in Singapore.

The freedoms of speech, assembly and association guaranteed by the Constitution are enjoyed only by Singapore citizens. In Review Publishing Co. Ltd. v. Lee Hsien Loong (2009), it was held that the appellant newspaper company did not have the requisite locus standi to rely on the constitutional right of free speech and expression as it was not a Singapore citizen, and Article 14(1)(a) of the Constitution expressly provides that only Singapore citizens are entitled to the right.

== Restrictions on the rights ==
The rights guaranteed to the citizens of Singapore by Article 14(1) are subject to restrictions set out in subsection (2) of the same Article. In Chee Siok Chin, Justice V.K. Rajah elucidated the justification for these qualifications:

The right of freedom of expression should never be exercised on the basis that opinions are expressed in hermetically sealed vacuums where only the rights of those who ardently advocate their views matter. That is entirely inappropriate. Freedom of expression when left unchecked may reach a point where protest, criticism and expression culminate in nuisance or something even more serious. The law inevitably has to intervene then.

In 1993 in a statement delivered at the World Conference on Human Rights, the Minister for Foreign Affairs Wong Kan Seng took the position that "order and stability are essential for development" as economic growth requires a stable legal environment protective of contractual and property rights. Excessive focus on civil-political liberties during the early stages of national development would impair this. However, the Government appears to have loosened restrictions on political liberties like free speech over time to manage demands for a more participatory political culture. In fact, citizens were urged by Deputy Prime Minister Lee Hsien Loong not to be "passive bystanders in their own fate" but to debate issues "with reason, passion and conviction". Wrestling with "honest differences" was to be preferred over being "an apathetic society with no view".

Parliament may impose restrictions on the rights guaranteed by Article 14(1) on two types of grounds. For the first type, it must be shown that restricting the rights is "necessary or expedient in the interest" of the grounds. No such requirement applies to the second type of grounds, which appear in Articles 14(2)(a) and 14(3). At present, it appears that Parliament may restrict Article 14(1) rights on these grounds simply by enacting legislation, and that the courts are not entitled to assess if the restrictions are appropriate.

=== Meaning of Parliament may by law impose ===
Article 14(2) of the Constitution states that "Parliament may by law impose" restrictions on the rights referred to in Article 14(1). This is arguably in line with Singapore's adoption of the Westminster system of government that rests upon parliamentary supremacy, the rule of law and common law principles. The terms law and written law are defined in Article 2(1) of the Constitution as follows:

In this Constitution, unless it is otherwise provided or the context otherwise requires —

"law" includes written law and any legislation of the United Kingdom or other enactment or instrument whatsoever which is in operation in Singapore and the common law in so far as it is in operation in Singapore and any custom or usage having the force of law in Singapore; ...
"written law" means this Constitution and all Acts and Ordinances and subsidiary legislation for the time being in force in Singapore.

One reading of Article 14(2) is that in order to restrict the rights to freedom of speech, assembly and association, Parliament must impose the restrictions by passing written laws, that is, Acts of Parliament, since it exercises the legislative power of Singapore by passing bills that are assented to by the President. However, in Jeyaretnam Joshua Benjamin v. Lee Kuan Yew (1990), a case involving defamation law, the Court of Appeal took a much broader approach. The Court noted that according to Article 2(1), law in Article 14(2) includes the common law in so far as it is in operation in Singapore. In May 1963, the Parliament of Malaysia had enacted the Malaysia Act 1963, which extended the Defamation Act 1957 to Singapore, then a state in the Federation of Malaysia. Since the Act, now the Defamation Act (Cap. 75, 1985 Rev. Ed.), was premised on common law rules of the tort of defamation, the Court held that the Legislature had "clearly intended that the common law relating to defamation, as modified by the Act, should continue to apply in Singapore". Thus, it is "manifestly beyond argument that Art 14(1)(a) is subject to the common law of defamation as modified by the Act".

It has been said that this argument "suffers from two fatal flaws". There is no evidence that the constitutionality of the existing rules of defamation was considered by either the Malaysian or Singapore Parliaments. More significantly, even if the Governments of Malaysia and Singapore had believed these rules to be constitutional, this should not have been treated by the Court of Appeal as decisive as it is the courts' duty to independently determine whether the assumption is justified. Otherwise, a similar argument might be extended to all legislation passed by Parliament, and "[i]t is not difficult to see that this would spell the end of constitutional law itself".

=== Restrictions premised on necessity or expediency ===
Parliament may restrict the rights to free speech, assembly and association on the grounds set out in the table below if it is "necessary or expedient in the interest" of them:

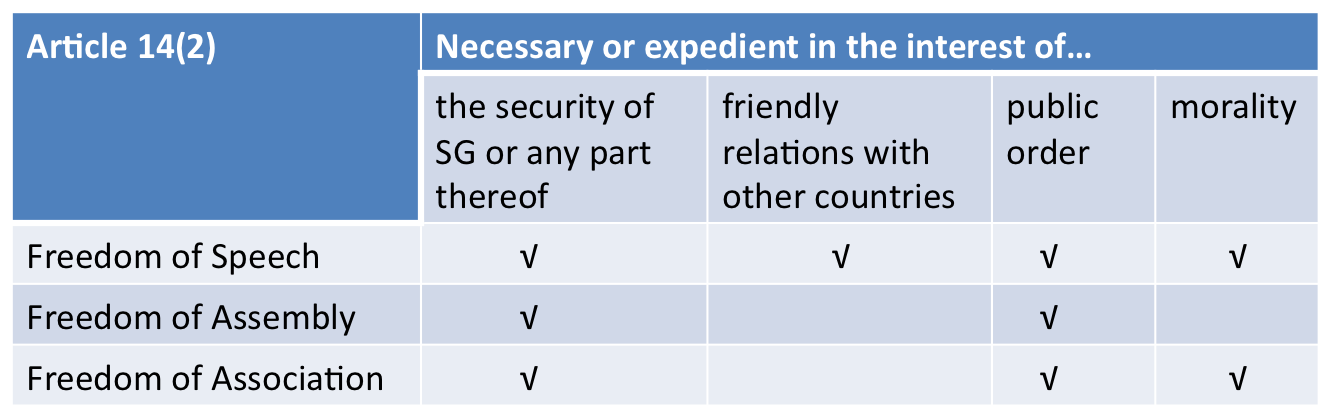
Grounds on which Article 14(1) rights may be restricted if it is "necessary or expedient" to do so (SG is an abbreviation for Singapore)

In Chee Siok Chin, the High Court interpreted the phrase necessary or expedient as conferring upon Parliament "an extremely wide discretionary power and remit that permits a multifarious and multifaceted approach towards achieving any of the purposes specified in Art 14(2) of the Constitution". The Court emphasized the fact that, unlike Article 19(3) of the Constitution of India which provides that the right to fetter the freedom of speech and assembly is subject to the touchstone of reasonableness, Singapore's Article 14(2) does not contain the word reasonable. However, despite the broad power that Article 19(3) accords to the Indian courts, they have been "most reluctant" to invalidate legislation purportedly infringing the rights to free speech or assembly. There exists a strong presumption of legislative constitutionality, as the Supreme Court of India has expressed a need for "judicial self-restraint and extreme caution" when determining whether legislation unreasonably restricts a constitutional right. It has been noted that the Indian courts have thus been used to exemplify how much more deference Singapore courts should give to the Government, and that the Article 14(2) derogation clause was said to confer upon Parliament a great amount of discretionary power.

The High Court also rejected the use of a proportionality analysis when determining the extent of Parliament's powers to impose restrictions on individual rights. The analysis enables the judiciary to assess if an interference with rights is proportionate to a legitimate and important aim of the legislation in question. A court will inquire into whether relevant and sufficient reasons justify the statutory interference, and may substitute its own judgement for that of Parliament. The High Court concluded: "Needless to say, the notion of proportionality has never been part of the common law in relation to the judicial review of the exercise of a legislative and/or an administrative power or discretion. Nor has it ever been part of Singapore law."

Bearing in mind these restraints, the court's only task is to ascertain whether an impugned law is within the purview of any of the permissible restrictions. Hence, all that needs to be established is a nexus between the object of the law in question and one of the permissible subjects stipulated in Article 14(2). In doing so, the Government must merely satisfy the court that there is a factual basis on which Parliament has considered it "necessary or expedient" to restrict one's individual right to freedom of speech, assembly or association.

When determining whether legislative restrictions are "in the interest of" the relevant purposes specified in Article 14(2), the courts may examine the impugned statute, relevant parliamentary material and contemporary speeches and documents, and will adopt a "generous and not a pedantic interpretation". Moreover, the term in the interest of, when contrasted with the maintenance of, grants "a much wider legislative remit that allows Parliament to take a prophylactic approach" and includes "laws that are not purely designed or crafted for the immediate or direct maintenance" of the Article 14(2) grounds.

==== Security of Singapore; friendly relations with other countries ====
Parliament may restrict the rights to freedom of speech, assembly or association if it is necessary or expedient in the interests of the security of Singapore or any part thereof. The courts have taken a broad approach to this exception, and have shown a considerable amount of deference to the Government. For instance, in Public Prosecutor v. Phua Keng Tong (1986), a case involving the Official Secrets Act, the High Court held that security in Article 14(2) does not merely mean protection from danger but includes the "protection of information which the Government considers vital or essential for its administration". However, not everything that the Government regards as an official secret will be necessarily be deemed to be so by the court, especially if the information is "innocuous in nature". The burden of proving that official information is secret lies on the Prosecution.

Freedom of speech and expression may also be restricted in the interest of friendly relations with other countries. This ground of restriction has not yet been considered by local courts, but might have justified the withdrawal by the Board of Film Censors (BFC) of a certificate issued for the film Zoolander (2001) with effect from 8 February 2002. The film, a comedy about a male model played by Ben Stiller who is brainwashed into attempting to assassinate the Prime Minister of Malaysia, had earlier been condemned by the Malaysian Film Censorship Board as "definitely unsuitable", though it did not impose a ban as it expected film distributors to exercise discretion. The BFC stated only that the film had been banned "in view of controversial elements gathered from feedback". The ban was lifted at the beginning of 2006, which enabled the film to be released on DVD.

==== Public order ====
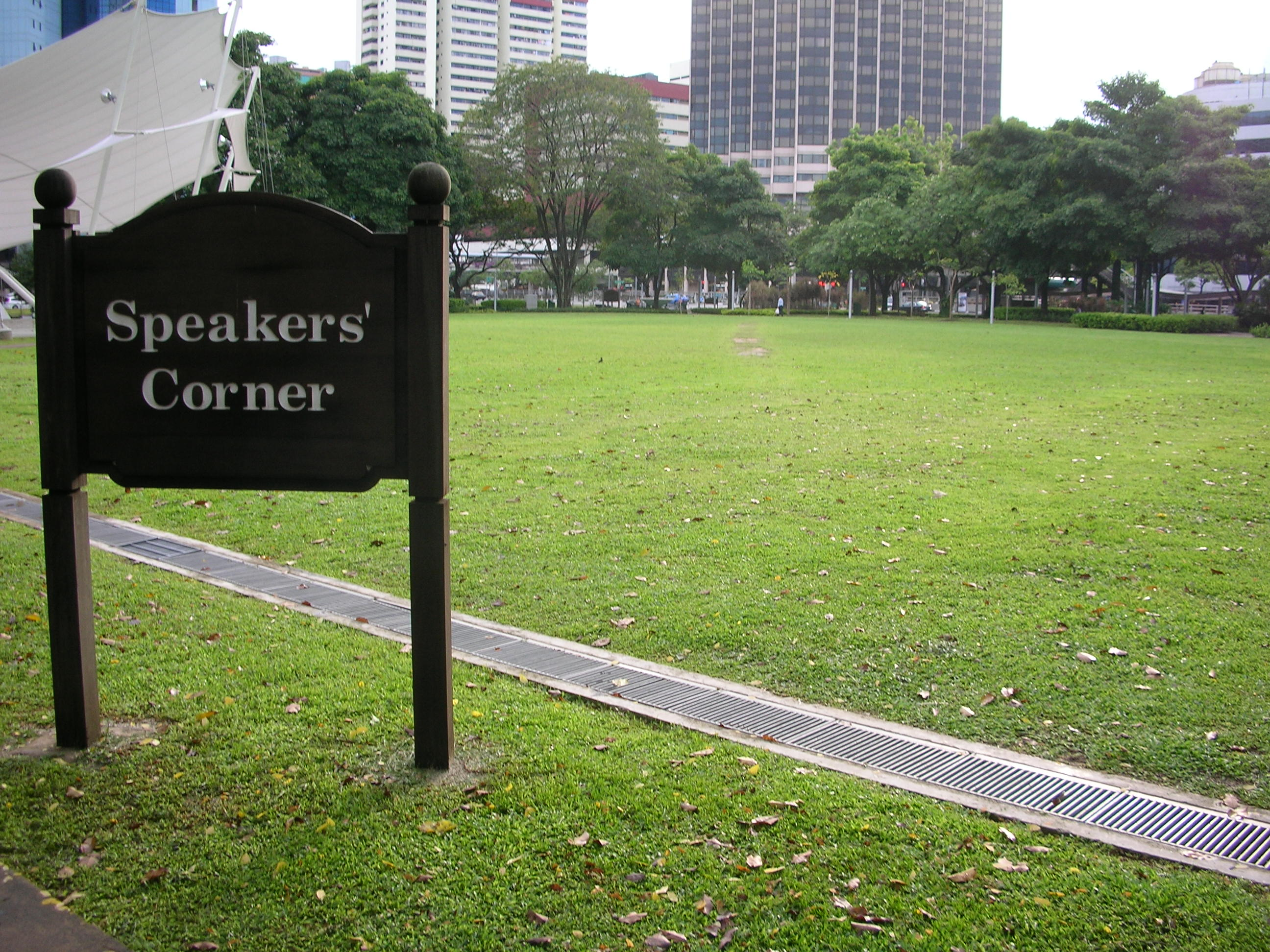
Speakers' Corner in Singapore is the only venue where rallies and other restricted events may be held without permits under the Public Entertainments and Meetings Act and Public Order Act, except during an election period

Article 14(2) also empowers Parliament to impose restrictions on the rights guaranteed by all three limbs of Article 14(1) on the ground of public order. The term public order has been given an expansive interpretation that highlights the importance which the Singapore Government places upon social stability. In Chee Siok Chin, which dealt with the constitutionality of sections 13A and 13B of the Miscellaneous Offences (Public Order and Nuisance) Act the High Court approved the following quotation from V.N. Shukla's Constitution of India (9th ed., 1994):

The expression 'public order' is synonymous with public peace, safety, and tranquility. It signifies absence of disorder involving breaches of local significance in contradistinction to national upheavals such as revolution, civil strife or war, affecting the security of the State. To illustrate, the State may, in the interests of public order, prohibit and punish the causing of loud and raucous noise in streets and public places by means of sound amplifying instruments; regulate the hours and place of public discussions and the use of public streets for the purpose of exercising freedom; provide for expulsion of hecklers from meetings and assemblies; punish utterances tending to incite breach of the peace or riot and use of threatening, abusive or insulting words or behaviour in any public place or at any public meeting with intent to cause a breach of the peace or whereby breach of the peace is likely to be caused, and all such acts as would endanger public safety.

Such an interpretation is consistent with earlier cases. In Chan Hiang Leng Colin v. Public Prosecutor (1994), Chief Justice Yong Pung How considered the term in relation to the right to freedom of religion embodied in Article 15(4) of the Constitution and stated:

I am of the view that religious beliefs ought to have proper protection, but actions undertaken or flowing from such beliefs must conform with the general law relating to public order and social protection. The right of freedom of religion must be reconciled with "the right of the State to employ the sovereign power to ensure peace, security and orderly living without which constitutional guarantee of civil liberty would be a mockery" (Commissioner, HRE v LT Swamiar AIR 1954 SC 282). The sovereignty, integrity and unity of Singapore are undoubtedly the paramount mandate of the Constitution and anything, including religious beliefs and practices, which tend to run counter to these objectives must be restrained.

In Chee Siok Chin it was further clarified that "the legislative power to circumscribe the rights conferred by Art 14 of the Constitution is, inter alia, delineated by what is 'in the interest of public order' and not confined to 'the maintenance of public order'. This is a much wider legislative remit that allows Parliament to take a prophylactic approach in the maintenance of public order. This necessarily will include laws that are not purely designed or crafted for the immediate or direct maintenance of public order ...".

===== Restrictions on freedom of speech and assembly =====
The Government has power to limit the circulation of local and foreign media in Singapore under the Broadcasting Act and the Newspaper and Printing Presses Act ("NPPA"). These Acts can be considered as imposing restrictions on free speech based on public order. For instance, the Broadcasting (Class Licence) Notification, made under section 9 of the Broadcasting Act, makes it mandatory for an Internet content provider to register with the Media Development Authority (MDA) if it is, or if the Authority thinks that it is, an individual providing any programme about or a body of persons engaged in the "propagation, promotion or discussion of political or religious issues relating to Singapore, on the World Wide Web through the Internet". The MDA can fine a licencee, or suspend or cancel its licence, if it has breached the terms of its licence, any relevant code of practice issued by the Authority, any provisions of the Broadcasting Act, or any direction issued by the Authority or the Minister for Information, Communications and the Arts. In addition, it is an offence to provide a broadcasting service without a licence, and a convicted person is liable to a fine of up to S$200,000, jail of up to three years, or both. If the offence continues after conviction, a further fine of up to $10,000 per day may be imposed.

The Minister may declare that any foreign broadcasting service which is rebroadcast in Singapore has been "engaging in the domestic politics of Singapore". Rebroadcasting such a "declared foreign broadcasting service" is prohibited without the Minister's approval, which can be refused, revoked without reasons, or granted on conditions, which may include restrictions on the number of people permitted to receive the service and suspensions of the service for certain periods. Failing to comply with the above rules is a crime punishable by a fine of up to $100,000. Similar provisions exist in the NPPA to enable the circulation of foreign newspapers in Singapore to be restricted. In February 1987, the Asian Wall Street Journal was declared to have engaged in domestic politics and its circulation was limited to 400 copies. The newspaper's publisher, Dow Jones Publishing Co. (Asia) Inc., applied unsuccessfully to the High Court for certiorari to quash the Minister's orders. On appeal to the Court of Appeal, Dow Jones argued that the Minister had acted irrationally and misinterpreted scope of his powers under the NPPA by not considering the right to free speech protected by Article 14(1)(a). The Court dismissed the argument on the ground that Dow Jones could not rely on the Article as it only applied to Singapore citizens. Furthermore, even if Dow Jones could raise the constitutionality of the relevant provisions of the NPPA on the basis that Singapore citizens were indirectly affected by it, it was not evident that the right to free speech included the right to receive information. In any case, even if the latter argument was accepted, it might be said that the right of Singapore citizens to receive information by reading the Asian Wall Street Journal had not been impaired since 400 copies of it were still in circulation. The Court interpreted the term domestic politics broadly, holding that in Singapore's context it included:

... the political system of Singapore and the political ideology underpinning it, the public institutions that are a manifestation of the system and the policies of the government of the day that give life to the political system. In other words, the domestic politics of Singapore relate to the multitude of issues concerning how Singapore should be governed in the interest and for the welfare of its people.

In addition to empowering the Minister to limit the circulation of foreign newspapers as described above, the NPPA generally imposes curbs on the foreign ownership of newspaper companies, and requires a permit to be obtained for the publication, sale and distribution of newspapers. In a September 2011 statement, the Ministry of Information, Communications and the Arts justified the NPPA's existence, stating: "The various safeguards provided for in the NPPA help to ensure that the media operating in Singapore play a responsible role and that publishers are accountable for the content they publish. The safeguards also prevent local newspapers from being manipulated by foreign interests which can have a divisive effect on social cohesion. These considerations are still valid today. Journalistic freedom to report responsibly has not been compromised."

The Sedition Act, Public Entertainments and Meetings Act, and Public Order Act 2009 are statutes which arguably impose restrictions on the freedom of speech and expression, as well as the freedom of assembly, in the interests of public order. The Sedition Act has been used to restrict the propagation of opinions that have a seditious tendency, which includes a tendency to promote feelings of ill-will and hostility between different races or classes of Singapore's population. In Public Prosecutor v. Koh Song Huat Benjamin (2005), the accused was convicted under the Act for posting invective and pejorative anti-Muslim remarks on a blog and a forum on the Internet; and in Public Prosecutor v. Ong Kian Cheong and another (2009), a married couple were similarly convicted for distributing religious tracts that were considered seditious and objectionable to Muslims. The Public Entertainments and Meetings Act renders it an offence to provide public entertainment and hold meetings without a licence, and its constitutionality has been upheld before the courts in cases concerning political activities organized by opposition parties.

===== Restrictions on the freedom of association =====
The right to freedom of association guaranteed by Article 14(1)(c) is curtailed on public order grounds by the Societies Act. The Act requires all clubs, companies, partnerships and associations of ten or more persons to be registered with the Registrar of Societies unless they are already lawfully registered under other statutes. The Registrar may refuse to register certain specified societies if satisfied that, among other things, they are likely to be used "for purposes prejudicial to public peace, welfare or good order in Singapore"; it would be contrary to the national interest; or, if the society is a political association, its rules do not require all its members to be Singapore citizens or it is affiliated with some foreign organization that the Registrar considers contrary to the national interest. The list of specified societies includes the following:

- A society representing, promoting any cause or interest of, or discussing an issue relating to any clan, ethnic group, nationality or religion, or a class of persons defined by reference to their gender or sexual orientation.
- A political association.
- A society representing people who advocate, promote or discuss any issue relating to any civil or political right, including animal rights, environmental rights and human rights.
- A society discussing any matter relating to how Singapore society is governed.

Any society that is not registered is deemed to be an unlawful society, and, as regards such a society, being involved in its management, being a member of it, and attending its meetings, are all offences.

The Minister for Home Affairs also has power to order that a registered society be dissolved if it appears to him or her that, among other things, it is being used for unlawful purposes or for purposes "prejudicial to public peace, welfare or good order in Singapore". Once an order has been made, the society becomes an unlawful society. On 14 January 1972, the Singapore Congregation of Jehovah's Witnesses was dissolved, the Minister stating that the existence of the society was prejudicial to public welfare and good order because its members refused to do National Service, which is generally compulsory for male citizens and second-generation permanent residents. An attempt in Chan Hiang Leng Colin to challenge the ban on the grounds of freedom of religion protected by Article 15(1) of the Constitution proved unsuccessful.

==== Morality ====
Parliament may, under Articles 14(2)(a) and 14(2)(b) of the Constitution, rely on the ground of morality to impose restrictions on two of the constitutional freedoms embodied in Article 14: the right to freedom of speech and expression, and the right to freedom of association.

There are currently no Singaporean cases which have specifically discussed the meaning of morality. However, legislation such as the Films Act, which establishes film censorship and classification regimes; and the Undesirable Publications Act, under which obscene or otherwise objectionable publications may be banned, can be regarded as restrictions on free expression pursuant to this ground. In Rathinam Ramesh v. Public Prosecutor (2010), where the issue was the sentence that should be imposed on a person convicted of distributing uncertified films contrary to the Films Act, the High Court held that "the control of film distribution under the Films Act was for the purpose of maintaining public order and morality" and the accused had not undermined public morality since the films he had been distributing were not obscene.

With regard to the issue of censorship, in 2003 the Censorship Review Committee said that "the responsibility to guide and control will have to be increasingly borne by the individual, the public, particularly parents, and the industry. While the regulator may define and regulate sensitive areas like race and religion, in the areas of morality, the responsibility will have to be devolved to the public and citizen advisory committees." In response, the Ministry of Information, Communication and the Arts (MICA) stated that the Government "must continue to remain mindful of the concerns and values of the majority".

The meaning of morality is therefore dependent on the views of the majority of Singapore citizens, as expressed through public channels and citizen advisory committees. Censorship has therefore been applied to obscene content that "erodes moral values through pornography, deviant sexual practices, sexual violence, child pornography, bestiality, etc." Public morality is not a static idea, but one that evolves with societal norms and values. For example, the MICA has endorsed a "flexible and contextual approach for homosexual content", and has liberalized its censorship of issues such as violence, sexual content and nudity, and coarse language in media.

=== Restrictions not premised on necessity or expediency ===
Unique to Article 14(2)(a) is an addendum stating that the right to freedom of speech and expression may be curtailed by restrictions designed to protect the privileges of Parliament, or to provide against contempt of court, defamation or incitement to any offence. The Constitution does not require Parliament to show that is necessary or expedient to restrict free speech in the interest of these grounds.

==== Protection of the privileges of Parliament ====
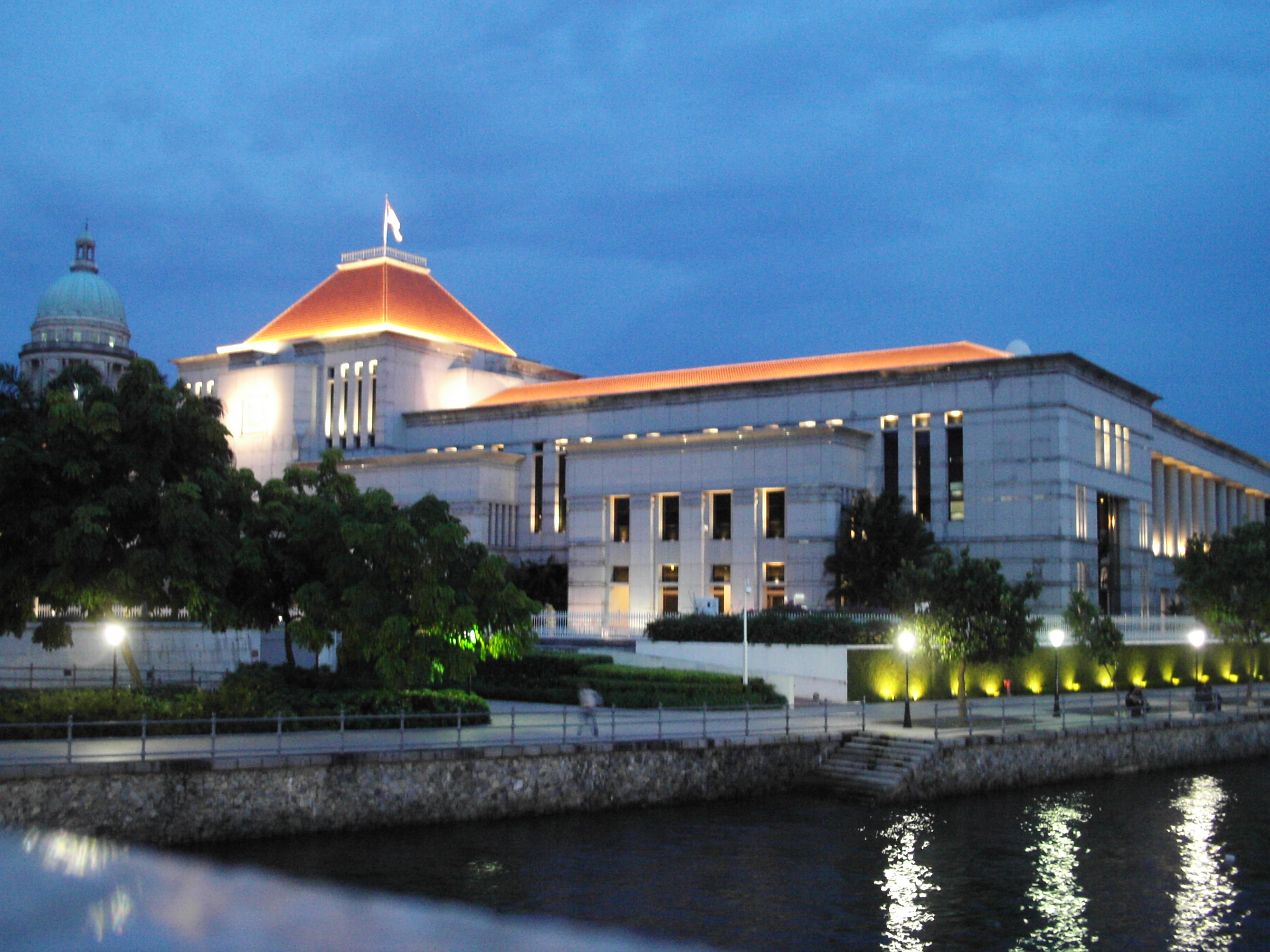
A view of Parliament House at night, photographed in November 2007

Article 63 of the Constitution provides for the Legislature to "determine and regulate the privileges, immunities or powers of Parliament" by law, and it has done so by enacting the Parliament (Privileges, Immunities and Powers) Act.

Under the Act, it is a contempt of Parliament to perform certain acts, for instance, to insult the Speaker or any Member of Parliament (MP) coming to or going from Parliament on account of his or her conduct in Parliament or of anything done or said by him or her in Parliament; or to publish any statement, whether in writing or otherwise, which falsely or scandalously defames, or which reflects on the character of, the Speaker or any MP touching on his or her conduct in Parliament or anything done or said by him or her in Parliament. It is presumably not open to a person charged with one of these offences to argue that it violates the Article 14 right to freedom of speech and expression. However, there is not yet any case law addressing this provision, and thus little guidance as to how the courts are to interpret the restriction.

==== Contempt of court ====
===== Constitutionality of the offence of scandalizing the court =====
Article 14(2)(a) of the Constitution provides that Parliament may restrict the right to freedom of speech and expression to provide against contempt of court. One of the more prominent uses of the court's contempt power has been for the Attorney-General to charge persons with the common law offence of scandalizing the court.

The High Court case of Attorney-General v. Wain (1991) established that by enacting section 8(1) of the Supreme Court of Judicature Act (Cap. 322 , 1985 Rev. Ed.) (now section 7(1) of Cap. 322, 2007 Rev. Ed.) ("SCJA"), which states that "[t]he High Court and the Court of Appeal shall have power to punish for contempt of court", Parliament had conferred on these courts the power to act against persons that have scandalized the court. Furthermore, Article 162 could not be relied upon to require that the offence be read down to conform with the right to freedom of speech and expression. Article 162 states:

Subject to this Article, all existing laws shall continue in force on and after the commencement of this Constitution and all laws which have not been brought into force by the date of the commencement of this Constitution may, subject as aforesaid, be brought into force on or after its commencement, but all such laws shall, subject to this Article, be construed as from the commencement of this Constitution with such modifications, adaptations, qualifications and exceptions as may be necessary to bring them into conformity with this Constitution.

The Court reasoned that Article 162 had no application to the SCJA as the latter was not an existing law at the date of commencement of the Constitution (that is, 9 August 1965), having been enacted in 1969. However, the Court did not consider the effect of Article 4 of the Constitution on the offence. That Article states: "This Constitution is the supreme law of the Republic of Singapore and any law enacted by the Legislature after the commencement of this Constitution which is inconsistent with this Constitution shall, to the extent of the inconsistency, be void." Subsequently, in Attorney-General v. Chee Soon Juan (2006), the High Court held that the offence of scandalizing the court could not be regarded as unconstitutional since Article 14(2)(a) clearly empowered Parliament to restrict free speech in order to punish acts amounting to contempt of court. Parliament had done so by enacting section 7(1) of the SCJA.

===== Constitutionality of the elements of the offence =====
The classic definition of a contempt by scandalizing the court was enunciated in R. v. Gray (1900) by the Lord Chief Justice of England and Wales, Lord Russell of Killowen, who said: "Any act done or writing published calculated to bring a Court or a judge of the Court into contempt, or to lower his authority, is a contempt of Court."

Up until Attorney-General v. Shadrake (2010), the High Court had adopted an "inherent tendency" test to determine liability for the offence. This was in contrast to the "real risk" test adopted by many other common law countries. The inherent tendency test was characterized by the act or words complained of possessing an inherent tendency to interfere with the administration of justice. Moreover, an act or statement would have such an inherent tendency if it conveyed to an average reasonable reader or viewer allegations of bias, lack of impartiality, impropriety or any wrongdoing concerning a judge (and a fortiori, a court) in the exercise of his judicial function.

In Shadrake, Justice Quentin Loh suggested that the distinction between the tests was in truth illusory. He expressed the view that if it was purely a question of semantics, it would be preferable for the court to adopt the real risk test as it precisely conveys to laymen and lawyers what the law is concerned with. He stated:

The [inherent tendency] formula has shown itself to be susceptible to controversy and misunderstanding, not least because the literal meaning of inherent tendency tends to obscure the fact that a contextual analysis is actually required. Indeed, given how the word 'inherent' is commonly understood to indicate something intrinsic, an inherent tendency test would therefore appear to preclude any consideration of extrinsic factors.

Holding that "a publication must post a real risk of undermining public confidence in the administration of justice before it is held to be contemptuous", Loh J. elucidated the elements of the real risk test as follows:

- A real risk is not to be equated with a serious or grave risk, but merely something more than a de minimis, remote or fanciful risk.
- Whether such a real risk is posed is an objective question of fact to be determined in light of all the circumstances of the case.
- The law is not concerned with the effect of the impugned publication, but the potential effect on public confidence in the administration of justice.

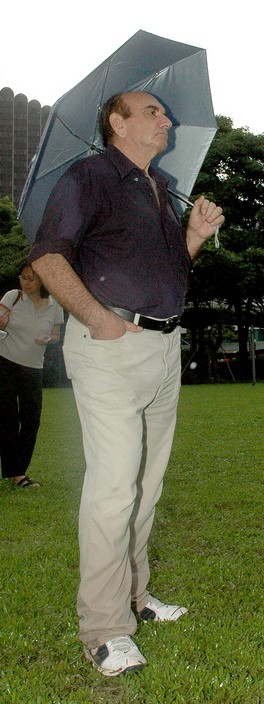
British author and former journalist Alan Shadrake attending a Reform Party rally at Speakers' Corner, Singapore, on 15 January 2011. In 2010, Shadrake was charged with scandalizing the court in his book Once a Jolly Hangman.

Counsel for the respondent had argued that the right to free speech compelled the adoption of the real risk test. However, the Court declined to consider the matter as it had already decided to adopt the test, and since full arguments had not been made on the point. Nonetheless, Loh J. said that the courts had to define the offence "consistently with the words, structure and spirit of Art 14, which clearly demand some kind of balance to be struck between the freedom of speech, which is the rule, and the offence of contempt, an exception to the rule. At the very minimum, neither can be defined in such a way that renders the other otiose." He noted that the respondent's counsel had not argued that the offence is inherently unconstitutional, and that a majority of cases had concluded that the real risk test, coupled with a right of fair criticism, is a reasonable limitation on free speech.

On appeal, the Court of Appeal in Shadrake v. Attorney-General (2011) held that the apparent difference between the inherent tendency test and the real risk test was a "legal red herring". However, since the inherent tendency test had caused confusion, it affirmed the High Court's ruling that the real risk test was the applicable test for scandalizing the court. It felt that trying to elaborate on the meaning of a "real risk" was not helpful, and that the court should simply ask itself whether, "having regard to the facts as well as surrounding context, a 'real risk' that public confidence in the administration of justice is – or would be – undermined as a result of the impugned statement?"

Although fair criticism has been treated as a defence to scandalizing the court in some cases, the Court of Appeal preferred to view it as an element of liability, though it cautioned that "the precise characterisation of the concept of fair criticism was not fully canvassed before us ... . Accordingly, our views on this point must necessarily be taken, to that extent, to be provisional in nature." The Court said that adopting this approach ensures that an alleged contemnor is not disadvantaged with regard to the burden of proof: "If the concept of fair criticism relates to liability, then the evidential burden would be on the party relying on it. The legal burden, on the other hand, would be on the Respondent to prove beyond a reasonable doubt that the impugned statement does not constitute fair criticism, and that it presents a real risk of undermining public confidence in the administration of justice. If, however, the concept of fair criticism constitutes a defence, then the legal burden would shift to the alleged contemnor to show on the balance of probabilities that the impugned statement amounts to fair criticism."

The Court approved the factors set out by the High Court in Attorney-General v. Tan Liang Joo John (2009) that are relevant in establishing that criticism of the courts is fair:

- Criticism must be supported by argument and evidence.
- Criticism must generally be expressed in a temperate and dispassionate manner. This allows rational debate about the issues raised, and thus may even contribute to the improvement and strengthening of the administration of justice.
- Courts can take into consideration the party's attitude in court and the number of instances of condemning conduct.

In Tan Liang Joo John, Justice Judith Prakash stated that this was not a closed list, and that the court is entitled to take into account all the circumstances of the case which in its view go towards showing bad faith. She also noted that English authorities impose another limit on the content of criticism – that the acts or words in question must neither impute improper motives to nor impugn the integrity, propriety and impartiality of judges or the courts. However, she declined to follow these authorities and averred that to impose such a limit would be unnecessary and potentially over-restrictive of legitimate criticism.

As regards the relationship between the offence of scandalizing the court and the right to free speech, the Court of Appeal commented that:

... the law relating to contempt of court operates against the broader legal canvass [sic: canvas] of the right to freedom of speech that is embodied both within Art 14 of the Constitution of the Republic of Singapore ... as well as the common law. The issue, in the final analysis, is one of balance: just as the law relating to contempt of court ought not to unduly infringe the right to freedom of speech, by the same token, that right is not an absolute one, for its untrammelled abuse would be a negation of the right itself.

The Court pointed out that the last mentioned point was embodied in Article 14(2) and noted that Parliament had provided the courts with jurisdiction to punish for contempt by enacting section 7(1) of the SCJA. It held that the real risk test strikes an appropriate balance between free speech and its abuse, and declined to apply the "clear and present danger" test applicable to the First Amendment to the US Constitution as free speech had gained a paramount status in the US quite different from Commonwealth jurisdictions due to the nation's unique cultural and constitutional heritage.

==== Defamation ====
Article 14(2)(a) of the Constitution also provides Parliament with the power to impose restrictions designed to provide against defamation. The law of defamation thus functions as a restriction on a person's right to freedom of speech. The law of defamation has its roots in the common law which existed before the enactment of the Constitution in 1965. As such, the courts must take Article 162 of the Constitution into consideration when deciding whether the common law tort of defamation offends the fundamental liberty of freedom of speech and expression. The Article provides that all existing laws shall continue in force after the commencement of the Constitution subject to "modifications, adaptations, qualifications and exceptions as may be necessary to bring them into conformity" with the Constitution of Singapore.

However, in Review Publishing, the Court of Appeal held that the common law of defamation, as modified by the Defamation Act, restricts the right to free speech. The appellants in that case pointed out that the Defamation Ordinance 1960, which presupposed the existence of the common law of defamation, had been enacted before the 1963 Constitution of the State of Singapore. Thus, it could not have been a law enacted to derogate from the right to free speech guaranteed by Article 10(1)(a) of the Federal Constitution of Malaysia, which became applicable to Singapore when it became a state of the Federation of Malaysia on 16 September 1963. The Court disagreed, holding that Article 105(1) of the 1963 State Constitution, which was the predecessor of Article 162, had the effect of re-enacting all laws existing as at 16 September 1963, including the Defamation Ordinance. Thus Article 105(1) itself was an express restriction on the right to free speech. If this was not the case, then when the 1963 State Constitution came into force all laws which restricted Article 10(1) of the Federal Constitution would have become unconstitutional, a result which the Court regarded as an "astonishing conclusion".

===== Defence of qualified privilege and the public figure doctrine =====
Article 14 of the Constitution has been raised as a point of contention in relation to the defence of qualified privilege. The Court of Appeal has discussed the applicability of Article 14 in two cases concerning prominent government figures.

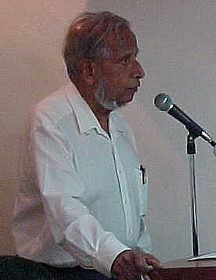
In a 1992 case in which Opposition MP Joshua Benjamin Jeyaretnam (pictured here in November 2005) was sued for defamation by the Senior Minister (and former Prime Minister) Lee Kuan Yew, the Court of Appeal held that Jeyaretnam could not rely on a public figure defence

In Jeyaratnam Joshua Benjamin v. Lee Kuan Yew (1992), Justice L.P. Thean, when delivering the judgement of the court, held that "[p]ersons holding public office or politicians ... are equally entitled to have their reputations protected as those of any other persons". In this case, counsel for the appellant argued that "qualified privilege attaches to defamatory publications concerning public officials (or candidates for a public office) relating to their official conduct or the performance of their public duties by those who have an honest and legitimate interest in the matter to those who have a corresponding and legitimate interest (whether as electors or as citizens potentially affected by the conduct of public officials)". The fact that the statements were made in a political rally during the run-up to elections meant that the requirement of a legitimate interest was met. Lingens v. Austria (1986) was relied upon in support of the premise that "the limits of acceptable criticism are accordingly wider as regards a politician as such than as regards a private individual". In Lingens, the European Court of Human Rights was of the opinion that a politician "inevitably and knowingly lays himself open to close scrutiny of his every word and deed by both journalists and the public at large, and he must consequently display a greater degree of tolerance". The reasoning of the European Court was in line with the public figure doctrine enunciated in New York Times Co. v. Sullivan (1964), where the United States Supreme Court decided in favour of the defendant newspaper, making it one of the key decisions supporting the freedom of the press.

However, the Singapore Court of Appeal dismissed the applicability of both cases on the ground that the terms of Article 14 of the Constitution differ materially from Article 10 of the European Convention on Human Rights, which was relied upon by the court in Lingens; as well as the First Amendment and the Fourteenth Amendment to the United States Constitution, which were relied upon by the court in New York Times. The public figure doctrine was thus expressly rejected by the Court. Thean J. said: "Such criticisms or attacks must, in our opinion, respect the bounds set by the law of defamation, and we do not accept that the publication of false and defamatory allegations, even in the absence of actual malice on the part of the publisher, should be allowed to pass with impunity."

To further rebut the presumption that the circumstances of a general election are sufficient to give rise to an occasion of privilege, the Court also relied on section 14 of the Defamation Act which, at the time, provided thus:

A defamatory statement published by or on behalf of a candidate in any election to Parliament or other elected or partially elected body shall not be deemed to be published on a privileged occasion on the ground that it is material to a question in issue in the election, whether or not the person by whom it is published is qualified to vote at the election.

The court was unwilling to extend the traditional defence of qualified privilege as it was of the opinion that Parliament's intention in enacting section 14 was clear: it is wholly untenable that the speech made at an election rally is privileged when the same speech published by or on behalf of a candidate for the election is not.

The Court of Appeal's reasoning in Jeyaretnam has been the subject of academic criticism. Michael Hor has criticized the distinction drawn by the Court between Article 14 of the Constitution and its American and European counterparts as overly literal. The current interpretation of the law gives the legislature an unfettered discretion in limiting freedom of speech in Singapore through the enactment and amendment of relevant legislation. Hor opines that:

What is instructive and applicable in Singapore is the realisation that it is the constitutional responsibility of the judiciary to ensure that the basic commitment to the freedom of speech is not undermined by giving the Legislature carte blanche to derogate therefrom in either some or all of the specified exceptions. Our courts must assume the task of scrutinising the prevailing rules of defamation to ensure that they strike a justifiable balance between the freedom of speech and the need to protect individual reputation.

Hor has also said that the Court's approach in Jeyaretnam fails to provide adequate safeguards to account for future politicians and holders of public office who may be less than honourable. Moreover, Singapore courts should not start with the assumption that the common law is necessarily constitutional, as this would be tantamount to "putting the cart before the horse". Rather, the Constitution ought to be interpreted consistently with the common law.

===== Defence of responsible journalism =====
In Review Publishing, Chief Justice Chan Sek Keong, delivering judgement on behalf of the Court of Appeal, declined to infer into the common law of Singapore the defence of responsible journalism, or "Reynolds privilege", developed by the House of Lords in Reynolds v. Times Newspapers Ltd. (1999), at least where non-Singapore citizens who have been sued for defamation are seeking to rely on it. This was because the defence was not a natural development of common law principles but had been impelled by the right to freedom of expression protected by Article 10 of the European Convention. The Reynolds privilege could only be adopted in Singapore on the basis of the right to free speech guaranteed by Article 14(1)(a) of the Constitution. However, as the appellants were not Singapore citizens, they could not rely on this provision.

The Court then discussed, on an obiter basis, the applicability of the Reynolds privilege to Singapore citizens. It held that the key question is whether or not, in the context of publication of matters of public interest, the rationale behind the Reynolds privilege ought to apply such that constitutional free speech is the rule and restrictions on this right are the exception. In considering the factors relevant to the key question, Chan C.J. stated that whilst the court has the power to dictate the direction of the common law of defamation as adopted upon the enactment of the Constitution, Parliament still has overriding powers to limit the freedom of speech and expression where defamatory publications and statements are made:

First, our courts must be mindful of the extent to which they can decide whether constitutional free speech should prevail over protection of reputation. Although there is nothing in Art 14(2)(a) of the Singapore Constitution and the Defamation Act which precludes our courts from developing the common law of defamation for the common convenience and welfare of society in keeping with Singapore's prevailing political, social and cultural values (save for those provisions in these two statutes which impose such a restriction), Art 14(2)(a) also expressly provides that it is Parliament which has the final say on how the balance between constitutional free speech and protection of reputation should be struck.

Secondly, when striking a balance between freedom of expression and the protection of reputation, the court will need to make a value judgement that is dependent on local political and social conditions. The Court said that the following factors were relevant to the making of this value judgement:

- In its opinion, the balance between constitutional free speech and protection of reputation that has been struck by the current law of defamation in Singapore is appropriate in the circumstances of the present day.
- Singapore law does not recognize journalistic material that relates to matters of public interest as having any particular importance, and "there is no room in our political context for the media to engage in investigative journalism which carries with it a political agenda".
- Honesty and integrity in public discourse on matters of public interest, particularly the way the country is governed, are greatly emphasized by the political culture in Singapore.

Finally, the Court expressed the view that if free speech is to be favoured over the protection of reputation in applying a Reynolds-type defence, another issue that will have to be considered is what balance should be struck between the two competing interests. In this connection, Chan C.J. said that the court would have to decide whether freedom of expression is to be given preference over the protection of reputation, whether it is a fundamental right that trumps the protection of reputation unless it is shown that the defamatory statement was made maliciously, or whether it is co-equal with the protection of reputation.

The Chief Justice also suggested that the rationale in the Reynolds case might be given effect by continuing to find the defendant liable for defamation but reducing the amount of damages payable depending on how much care he or she took to ensure the accuracy of the information published. He noted: "There is no reason why a defendant who has published a defamatory statement should be allowed to get off scot-free for injuring the plaintiff's reputation simply because he has satisfied the 'responsible journalism' test."

==== Incitement to any offence ====
Article 14(2)(a) of the Constitution provides that the right to freedom of speech and expression may be restricted to provide against incitement to any offence. This ground has not yet been considered in a Singapore case.

A number of statutory provisions prohibit incitement. Under section 107(a) of the Penal Code, a person is said to abet the doing of a thing if he or she instigates someone to do that thing. If a person abets an offence, and as a result the act abetted is committed, the person is to be punished with the punishment provided for the offence. If the offence is not committed due to the abetment, and it is punishable by imprisonment, the abettor is to be imprisoned for up to a quarter of the maximum jail term of the offence, or may receive a fine, or both. If either the abettor or the person abetted is a public servant whose duty it was to prevent the offence from happening, the abettor may be imprisoned for up to half of the maximum jail term of the offence, or may be fined, or receive both penalties. However, if the offence abetted but not committed is punishable with death or life imprisonment, the abettor is liable to a penalty of up to seven years' imprisonment, a fine, or both. If any hurt is caused as a result of the abetment, the abettor may be jailed up to 14 years and must also be fined.

Under section 505(c) of the Penal Code, it is an offence to make, publish or circulate any statement, rumour or report in written, electronic or other media with an intent to incite, or which is likely to incite, any class or community of persons to commit any offence against any other class or community of persons. The penalty is imprisonment for up to three years, a fine, or both. No offence is committed if the person who made, published or circulated the statement had reasonable grounds for believing it was true, and did not intend to incite one community against another.

==== Laws relating to labour or education ====
Article 14(3) provides that the right to form associations may also be restricted by any law relating to labour or education. The Trade Unions Act regulates labour organizations, while schools are generally required to be registered under either the Education Act or the Private Education Act. Under the Education Act, it is an offence for pupils or other persons to assemble on the premises of a school the registration of which has been cancelled. Statutes governing universities provide that student bodies created pursuant to a university's constituent documents must be registered under the Societies Act unless the Minister for Home Affairs has exempted such bodies.

=== Other restrictions ===
Under Article 149(1) of the Constitution, if an Act recites that action has been taken or threatened by any substantial body of persons inside or outside Singapore:

- to cause, or to cause a substantial number of citizens to fear, organized violence against persons or property;
- to excite disaffection against the President or the Government;
- to promote feelings of ill-will and hostility between different races or other classes of the population likely to cause violence;
- to procure the alteration, otherwise than by lawful means, of anything by law established; or
- which is prejudicial to the security of Singapore,

any provision of that law designed to stop or prevent that action or any amendment to that law is valid even if it is inconsistent with specified fundamental liberties, including the rights to freedom of speech, assembly and association guaranteed by Article 14. Article 149 thus shields the Internal Security Act from unconstitutionality. Among other things, the Act authorizes detention without trial to prevent persons from acting in a manner prejudicial to Singapore's security or the maintenance of public order or essential services.

== Other provisions ==
Section 5 of the Parliament (Privileges, Immunities and Powers) Act, enacted pursuant to Article 63 of the Constitution, specifically provides for freedom of expression in Parliament in the following terms:

There shall be freedom of speech and debate and proceedings in Parliament, and such freedom of speech and debate and proceedings shall not be liable to be impeached or questioned in any court, commission of inquiry, committee of inquiry, tribunal or any other place whatsoever out of Parliament.

This provision is based on one of the rights stated in the English Bill of Rights 1689 which reads: "[T]he Freedome of Speech and Debates or Proceedings in Parlyament ought not to be impeached or questioned in any Court or Place out of Parlyament."
