= Censorship in Singapore =

Censorship in Singapore mainly targets political, racial, religious issues and homosexual content as defined by out-of-bounds markers.

== Implementation ==
The Infocomm Media Development Authority (IMDA) approves publications, issues arts entertainment licences and enforces the Free-to-air (FTA) TV Programme Code, Subscription TV Programme Code, TV Advertising Code, Radio Programme Code and Radio Advertising Code through financial penalties. The MDA's decisions may be appealed to the Broadcast, Publications and Arts Appeal Committee (BPAA) and the Films Appeal Committee (FAC). The Censorship Review Committee (CRC) meets every ten years to "review and update censorship objectives and principles to meet the long-term interests of our society". The CRC was most recently reconvened in 2009 and made some 80 recommendations the following year, most of which were accepted.

== Justification ==
The government of Singapore argues that censorship of political, racial, religious and homosexuality issues to a certain extent is necessary to avoid upsetting the delicate balance of Singapore's multi-racial society.

== Films and videos ==
The importing, making, distributing or exhibiting of films in Singapore is governed by the Films Act of 1981. Films for commercial release are presented to the IMDA which classifies the films under six different ratings for different groups of audiences:

- G (general) – Suitable for all ages.
- PG (parental guidance) – Suitable for most but parents should guide their young.
- PG13 (parental guidance 13) – Suitable for persons aged 13 and above but parental guidance is advised for children below 13.
- NC16 (no children under 16) – Restricted to persons 16 years and above.
- M18 (mature 18) – Restricted to persons 18 years and above.
- R21 (restricted 21) – Strictly for adults aged 21 and above. Films under this category are restricted to be screened in licensed venues only.
- Refusal of classification, formerly NAR (not allowed for all ratings) – In exceptional cases, a film may be refused classification when the content of the film undermines national interest or erodes the moral fabric of society. This includes themes that promote issues that denigrate any race or religion, or undermine national interest, language that denigrates religion or is religiously profane, real sexual activities (e.g. actual penetration, actual ejaculation), content deemed to be pornographic or obscene in nature, explicit promotion and normalisation of homosexual lifestyle, explicit homosexual activity, materials glorifying or encouraging drug and substance abuse and detailed or gratuitous depictions of extreme violence or cruelty. Films that are refused classification in Singapore are banned and cannot be legally sold, rented, possessed, imported or made public in any format in Singapore, punishable by fines and/or imprisonment.

In April 2008, 4 documentaries were banned at the Singapore International Film Festival. Two of them titled Arabs and Terrorism and David the Tolhildan were "disallowed on the account of the sympathetic portrayal of organizations deemed terrorist organizations by many countries," according to the Board of Film Censors chairman. A Jihad for Love, which concerned homosexuals living within Muslim communities, was banned because of the "sensitive nature of the subject." Lastly, the documentary Bakushi was blacklisted because its topic of bondage "normalizes unnatural fetishes and behaviour."

In September 2014, Singaporean filmmaker Tan Pin Pin's documentary about Communist Party of Malaya (CPM) political exiles, To Singapore, With Love (2013), received an NAR rating, with the MDA claiming that it undermined national security as "the individuals in the film have given distorted and untruthful accounts of how they came to leave Singapore and remain outside Singapore," and that "a number of these self-professed 'exiles' were members of, or had provided support to, the proscribed CPM." The controversial Section 33 of the Films Act bans of the making, distribution and exhibition of "party political films", at pain of a fine not exceeding $100,000 or to imprisonment for a term not exceeding 2 years. The Act further defines a "party political film" as any film or video

(a) which is an advertisement made by or on behalf of any political party in Singapore or any body whose objects relate wholly or mainly to politics in Singapore, or any branch of such party or body; or
(b) which is made by any person and directed towards any political end in Singapore

Since March 2009, the Films Act has been amended to allow party political films as long as they were deemed factual and objective by a consultative committee. Some months later, this committee lifted the ban on Singapore Rebel, a 26-minute documentary film about Chee Soon Juan, the leader of opposition party Singapore Democratic Party (SDP).

== Music ==
In 1963, Singapore banned the hit song Puff, the Magic Dragon, fearing that it referenced marijuana. Janet Jackson's albums Velvet Rope and All For You were also banned due to homosexual and sexually explicit themes that the BPAA found "not acceptable to our society". The bans have since been lifted. Katy Perry's hit single, I Kissed a Girl, was banned from the airwaves as its lyrics that described homosexuality violated the Free-To-Air Radio Programme Code.

== Video games ==
On 14 April 2008, the Info-communications Media Development Authority announced that an official video games classification system will be in effect on 28 April 2008. No cuts are stipulated to Approved titles. Under the system, video games that contain stronger content such as graphic sex/nudity, strong coarse language, drug use, graphic violence/gore and mature themes will be given either an ADV16 rating label or use/share the M18 rating label used for film classification similar to those found on home video media in Singapore.

- General (Suitable for all ages) - Games approved for general distribution. These titles are not required to carry any rating labels.

Examples: Mario Party 10, The Lego Movie Videogame, and Angry Birds

Label banner for "Advisory 16" rating

- ADV16 (Advisory 16 – Suitable for persons 16 and above) – May contain moderate graphic violence, some drug use, implied sexual activity, partial nudity and some strong language. Before 2019, this classification rating was known as "Age Advisory".

Examples: Mass Effect 2, Assassin's Creed II, Resident Evil 5, Left 4 Dead, and Hitman: Blood Money

Basic "Mature 18" icon

- M18 (Mature 18 – Restricted to persons 18 years and above) May contain depictions of strong realistic violence, such as killing, maiming or causing other serious injury to humanoid characters if the violence is not sadistic, cruel and abhorrent, realistic drug use, portrayal of sexual activity with some nudity, both topless and full frontal, if not detailed, depiction of topless nudity or occasional full frontal nudity, frequent use of strong coarse language and mature themes including homosexual content.

Examples: Kingpin: Life of Crime, Yakuza 3, Age of Conan: Hyborian Adventures, Ninja Gaiden Sigma 2, Grand Theft Auto III, and Manhunt 2

A video game, in the most extreme cases, may be refused classification when the game contains content that exceeds acceptable social standards and could be potentially harmful to society. The purchase of M18 rated games legally require retailers to conduct age checks, while ADV16 rated games are not required to have mandatory age checks. Previously, the Media Development Authority had also banned several video games before the introduction of the classification system. For example, (as of November 2007) the video game The Darkness (due to presence of graphic violence and swear words) and more recently Mass Effect from BioWare due to the in game option of a homosexual romance if the player chooses to play as a female. Mass Effect was later unbanned with the implementation of the aforementioned games ratings system that was still in development then. However, similar games with graphic violence such as Prince of Persia and Gears of War (players can perform decapitation moves) or other BioWare games like Neverwinter Nights and Jade Empire (which both allow the possibility of male-male and female-female romances) have not been banned or censored.

== Performing arts ==
The scripts of all plays to be performed in Singapore must be vetted in advance by the Media Development Authority (MDA), which has the right to ban any it views as "contrary to the public interest". Appeals against MDA's decisions can be made to the Broadcast, Publications and Arts Appeal Committee (BPAA). In 1994, performance artist Josef Ng protested the arrest and caning of 12 homosexual men by caning slabs of tofu, then turning his back to the audience and snipping off some pubic hair. He was charged with committing an obscene act and banned from performing in public, and his theatre group's grants were cancelled.

In 2005, the MDA withheld the licence for the play Human Lefts by Benny Lim and Brian Gothong Tan unless some scenes were edited and all references to the death penalty removed. The play was originally written about the hanging of Shanmugam Murugesu and was to have been staged one day after the controversial execution of Australian national Nguyen Tuong Van.

In August 2006, a play Smegma was banned by Media Development Authority which said that: "the play portrays Muslims in a negative light."

In May 2010, the National Arts Council had cut the annual grant given to local theatre company W!LD RICE. It will get $170,000 this year, down from $190,000 the year before. It is the lowest annual grant that the company has received from the council. Artistic director Ivan Heng says the council told him funding was cut because its productions promoted alternative lifestyles, were critical of government policies and satirised political leaders. In March 2011, NAC increased to $1.92 million, a 25% hike, the amount to be given to 16 arts companies, including W!LD RICE, under its one-year Major Grant scheme.

In 2016, Chan Heng Chee, chairman of the National Arts Council (NAC), spoke on the issue of censorship and arts funding at the Singapore International Film Festival. Jee Leong Koh, a Singaporean poet, responded on the relationship between censorship and funding from the government via the NAC, and decided not to engage with the government for future funding. Koh subsequently called on fellow Singaporean artists to "reconsidering engagement with the state and its arts funding...". His reaction drew mixed responses from Singaporean artists.

== Television ==
The state-owned MediaCorp controls all free-to-air terrestrial local TV channels licensed to broadcast in Singapore, as well as 12 radio channels. Both free-to-air and pay television channels are available on cable and fiber. The popular HBO series Sex and the City was banned from broadcast originally in the late 90s when the series debuted but the ban was later lifted in 2004 after modifications to the Subscription TV Programme Code of Singapore. Private ownership of satellite dishes is illegal, though international TV broadcasts (such as CNN International, BBC World News, Fox News Channel, RT, etc.) are available on Starhub TV and SingTel IPTV service Singtel TV. The Info-communications Media Development Authority, through its Programme Advisory Committees for each of the four official languages, monitors and provides feedback on broadcast content. Permissible content on Singaporean TV is regulated by IMDA's Free-to-Air Television Programme Code. As of July 2011, Singapore relaxed television broadcast guidelines allowing Pay TV operators to screen NC16, M18 and R21 films containing graphic content and mature/controversial themes on Pay TV Video-on-Demand (VOD) services. In July 2016, the MDA officially greenlit R21-rated content for Over-the-Top (OTT) services.

== Internet ==
Internet services provided by the three major Internet service providers are subject to regulation by the Info-communications Media Development Authority (IMDA), which blocks 100 "symbolic" websites such as Playboy and YouPorn. Since 8 October 2014, online gambling has been regulated in Singapore.

Government agencies have been known to use or threaten to use litigation against bloggers and other Internet content providers. The first instance of such activity was against Sintercom in July 2001 when the founder, Dr Tan Chong Kee was asked to register the website under the nascent Singapore Broadcast Authority Act (now Media Development Authority). Dr Tan chose to shut down Sintercom due to concerns over the ambiguity of the Act. In April 2005, a blogger, Chen Jiahao, then a graduate student at the University of Illinois at Urbana-Champaign, was made to apologise and shut down his blog containing criticisms on government agency A*STAR, after its chairman Philip Yeo threatened to sue for defamation.

In September 2005, 3 people were arrested and charged under the Sedition Act for posting racist comments on the Internet. Two were sentenced to imprisonment. Later, the Teachers' Union announced that it is offering legal assistance to teachers who want to take legal action against students who defame them on their blogs, after five students from Saint Andrew's Junior College were suspended for three days for allegedly "flaming" two teachers and a vice-principal on their blogs.

In the last few years, the government has taken a much tougher stand on Internet-related matters, including censorship. Proposed amendments to the Penal Code intend to hold Internet users liable for "causing public mischief", and give the authorities broader powers in curtailing freedom of speech. In September 2008, US citizen Gopalan Nair was sentenced to 3 months imprisonment for insulting a public servant after he accused a Singapore judge of "prostituting herself" in his blog.

Starting 1 June 2013, the Media Development Authority requires sites "that report regularly on issues relating to Singapore and have significant reach" among website visitors in Singapore to apply for individual licences, which will be subject to annual renewal. These websites must then post a "performance bond" of 50,000 Singapore dollars and remove any objectionable content within 24 hours of receiving a government order. On 14 June 2013, the Asia Internet Coalition voiced their concerns.

== See also ==
- Offence of scandalizing the court in Singapore
- Public demonstrations in Singapore
- Human rights in Singapore
- OB marker
- Undesirable Publications Act (1967 law)
- Disneyland with the Death Penalty
