= Human rights in Singapore =

Since Singapore's independence in 1965, the human rights of Singaporeans have been set out in the Constitution of Singapore and include rights found in subsequent amendments and referendums. These rights have evolved through Singapore's history as a part of the Straits Settlements, its years under Japanese occupation, its position as a separate self-governing crown colony, and its present day status as a sovereign island country and city-state.

Article 14 of the Constitution of Singapore, specifically Article 14(1), guarantees and protects Singaporeans' rights to freedom of speech and expression, peaceful assembly without arms, and association. As a parliamentary democracy, Singaporeans are also guaranteed democratic rights to change their government through free and fair elections.

== Conscription ==
=== Enlistment Act (1970) ===
Similar to countries such as South Korea, Switzerland and Taiwan, all male Singapore citizens and second-generation permanent residents (PR) who have reached the age of 18 are required (unless medically exempt) to undergo a two-year conscription known as National Service. Those who have gone AWOL (Desertion) can be fined or sentenced to jail if there are no valid reasons for doing so.

Male citizens who hold dual citizenships may renounce their Singapore citizenship only upon completion of their service, unless they have citizenship of another country at age 11, and have announced to the Ministry of Defence of their intention to renounce their citizenships before the age of 11, and avoid all "socio-economic benefits of a Singapore citizenship" before their renunciation of Singaporean citizenship after attaining the age of majority. Second-generation permanent residents who renounce their PR status without serving NS will be blacklisted if they apply to return to Singapore to study or work in the future.

== Judicial punishments ==
=== Corporal punishment ===
Singapore employs corporal punishment in the form of caning for numerous criminal offences if committed by males under 50. This is a mandatory sentence for some offences such as rape and vandalism. Caning is never ordered on its own in Singapore, only in combination with imprisonment.

Caning can be enforced of at least three strokes, combined with a minimum of three months' imprisonment, for foreign workers and illegal immigrants who overstay by more than 3 months.

Corporal punishment may also be ordered for various sexual offences, rioting, the possession of weapons, violence of all kinds, illicit drug use, and vandalism of public property. Male members of the armed forces are liable to a less severe form of caning for breaches of military discipline.

=== Capital punishment ===
Singapore enforces the death penalty by hanging. It is mandatory for premeditated and aggravated murder and for the possession or trafficking of more than 14 grams (0.49 oz) of heroin in its pure form (diamorphine).

According to Amnesty International, some 400 criminals were hanged between 1991 and 2003, mostly for drug offenses, with firearms offenses and murder also punished with the death penalty. The government states that the death penalty is necessary to combat the Golden Triangle drug trade.

== Detention without trial ==
=== Internal Security Act ===
The Ministry of Home Affairs Internal Security Department enforces the country's Internal Security Act, which has the stated intent of countering potential espionage, international terrorism, threats to racial and religious harmony, and subversion.

The ISA permits indefinite detention without formal charges or recourse to trial, and was historically used to imprison political opponents of the People's Action Party during Operation Coldstore and Operation Spectrum.

=== Criminal Law (Temporary Provisions) Act ===
Internment without trial under the Criminal Law (Temporary Provisions) Act has been used to deal with espionage, terrorism, organised crime, and narcotics.

== Freedom of expression ==
Although the right to freedom of speech and association is guaranteed by Article 14(1) of the Constitution of Singapore, the People's Action Party government has been accused of restricting freedom of speech and limiting other civil and political rights, especially during the 20th century. Politics of Singapore is also marred with the dynastic politics, gerrymandering of political constituencies, and nepotism in Singapore politics.

The only place in Singapore where outdoor public assemblies do not require police permits for citizens is at the Speakers' Corner, similar to Hyde Park, London. However, foreigners still require a permit to speak at the park, and one must still register personal details with the National Parks Board before speaking or protesting at the Speakers' corner. There are also many surveillance cameras in the park, a situation that some Singaporeans and Singaporean MPs have commented on.

According to Amnesty International, laws that had limited freedom of expression and assembly, and to stifle critics and activists, had been somewhat relaxed in 2010, with government critics and human rights defenders being able to hold public gatherings without much interference. Nonetheless, lawsuits were taken out by the authorities against dissidents.

Censorship of content deemed by the state to be political and racially or religiously-sensitive occurs, and is imposed formally through stringent media regulations and informally through OB markers placed upon local journalists as well as the provision and withdrawal of public arts funding. Government pressure to conform has resulted in the practice of self-censorship by journalists.

=== Sedition Act ===
The Sedition Act prohibits seditious acts and speech; and the printing, publication, sale, distribution, reproduction and importation of seditious publications.

In addition to punishing actions that tend to undermine the administration of government, the Act also criminalizes actions which promote feelings of ill-will or hostility between different races or classes of the population.

=== Public Order Act (2009) ===
Under the Public Order Act 2009, a police permit is required to hold large public processions or outdoor assemblies legally. However, indoor assemblies could be held freely without the need to apply for police permits.

As of October 2017, all event organisers are required to notify the police if they expect more than 5,000 attendees for public events or 10,000 at any one time for private assemblies. The Commissioner of Police may refuse a permit for public assembly or procession if it is deemed to be directed towards a political or religious end, or is organised by or involving non-Singapore entities and citizens, due to the risk of foreign interference.

Police permits are not granted to events that are deemed to have a "significant risk of public disorder" and those that could "incite feelings of hostility between different racial and religious groups" in Singapore. Authorities have justified refusing permits on the grounds that racial riots have previously occurred in the country, most notably the 1964 and 1969 race riots.

=== Contempt of court ===
The offence of scandalizing the court is committed when a person brings a court or a judge into contempt, or to lower authority. Allegations of bias, lack of impartiality, impropriety or any wrongdoing concerning a judge in the exercise of his judicial function falls within the offence.

=== Newspaper and Printing Presses Act (1974) ===
The Act requires the chief editor or the proprietor of a newspaper to obtain a permit from the relevant Minister in order to print or publish a newspaper in Singapore. Section 10 of the Act gives the Minister the power to appoint the management shareholders of all newspaper companies and to control any transfers of such management shares. It also gives the management shareholders a minimum 66% majority in any votes regarding staffing decisions.

== Minority rights ==
=== LGBT rights ===
Singaporean law dating from 1938 until 2023 (Penal Code, s. 377A) banned sexual relations between men, but no prosecutions for private sexual activity have taken place since 1999. Since a May 2009 rally at Speaker's Corner at Hong Lim Park, gay-rights supporters have participated in the annual Pink Dot SG rally at Speaker's Corner, without government interference. The 2009 event was deemed significant enough to be included in the U.S. Department of State's human rights reports for 2009. On 21 August 2022, Prime Minister Lee Hsien Loong announced during the annual National Day Rally that the government intended to repeal Section 377A, effectively ending criminalisation both de facto and de jure. On 29 November 2022, the Parliament of Singapore passed a bill to repeal Section 377A. The bill was assented by President Halimah Yacob on 27 December 2022 and gazetted on 3 January 2023, thus Section 377A was struck off the books.

=== Immigrant workers' rights ===
Singapore provides basic protection for foreign domestic workers, such as a standard number of working hours and rest days. Foreign workers can also report their employers to the Ministry of Manpower in the case of mistreatment, and employers have been fined or even jailed when found guilty of such acts.

Previously, the recruitment fees of domestic workers can be up to 40% of the workers salary in a two-year contract. In 2020, the Singapore government announced that a law will be legislated that will pass the cost of placement fee to employers, as a way for the country to reduce its reliance on domestic workers.

== Privacy ==
When the Singapore constitution was written, it did not include a right to privacy and the subsequent data protection act does not protect citizens from government-sanctioned surveillance. The government does not need prior judicial authorisation to conduct any surveillance interception, and documents that restrict what officials can do with personal data are classified. In a U.S State Department report in 2015, it is believed that law enforcement and government agencies have extensive networks for gathering information and conducting surveillance. A majority of Singaporeans are widely aware that authorities track telephone conversations and the use of the internet of civilians, and indirect routine checks are done on some government critics.

The Singapore Info-communications Media Development Authority was listed as a customer of spyware maker Hacking Team in a data leak. The group is alleged to have used spyware to analyse the digital footprint of its intended audience.

The Ministry of Defence claims that the threshold for surveillance is higher in Singapore and that the majority of citizens have accepted the "surveillance situation" as necessary for deterring terrorism and "self-radicalisation." Singaporeans are said to have accepted the social contract between residents and their government, and expect to "surrender certain civil liberties and individual freedoms in exchange for fundamental guarantees: security, education, wealth, safety, affordable housing, and health care." With the push for the Smart Nation initiative to collate and analyse big data from all aspects of urban life for decision-making, it is unclear how individual rights to privacy will continue to be upheld.

In November 2017, it was announced that the government would introduce legislation in 2018 to mandate all private doctors to submit patient information for the centralised national healthcare database named National Electronic Health Records System (NEHR). Patients can request for their health records to be made inaccessible to physicians and healthcare workers, but the records will still be added and updated to the electronic system. While the authorities have asserted that only relevant healthcare workers will have access to the patients' data, it was noted that there have been cases of illegal access of patients' records from outside Singapore even with the privacy safeguards in place.

== Human trafficking ==
As of 2020, the U.S–based Trafficking in Persons report listed Singapore on Tier 1, which states that the Singapore government has fully complied with the TVPA's minimum standards, making it a non-issue.

== International agreements ==
According to Amnesty International, Singapore has signed the following international agreements relating to human rights:

- Convention on the Elimination of All Forms of Discrimination Against Women (CEDAW)
- Convention on the Rights of the Child (CRC)
- Optional Protocol to the CRC on the involvement of children in armed conflict in 2008
- International Convention on the Elimination of All Forms of Racial Discrimination
- International Covenant on Economic, Social and Cultural Rights (ICESCR)
