= William Gibson =

American-Canadian speculative fiction novelist (born 1948)

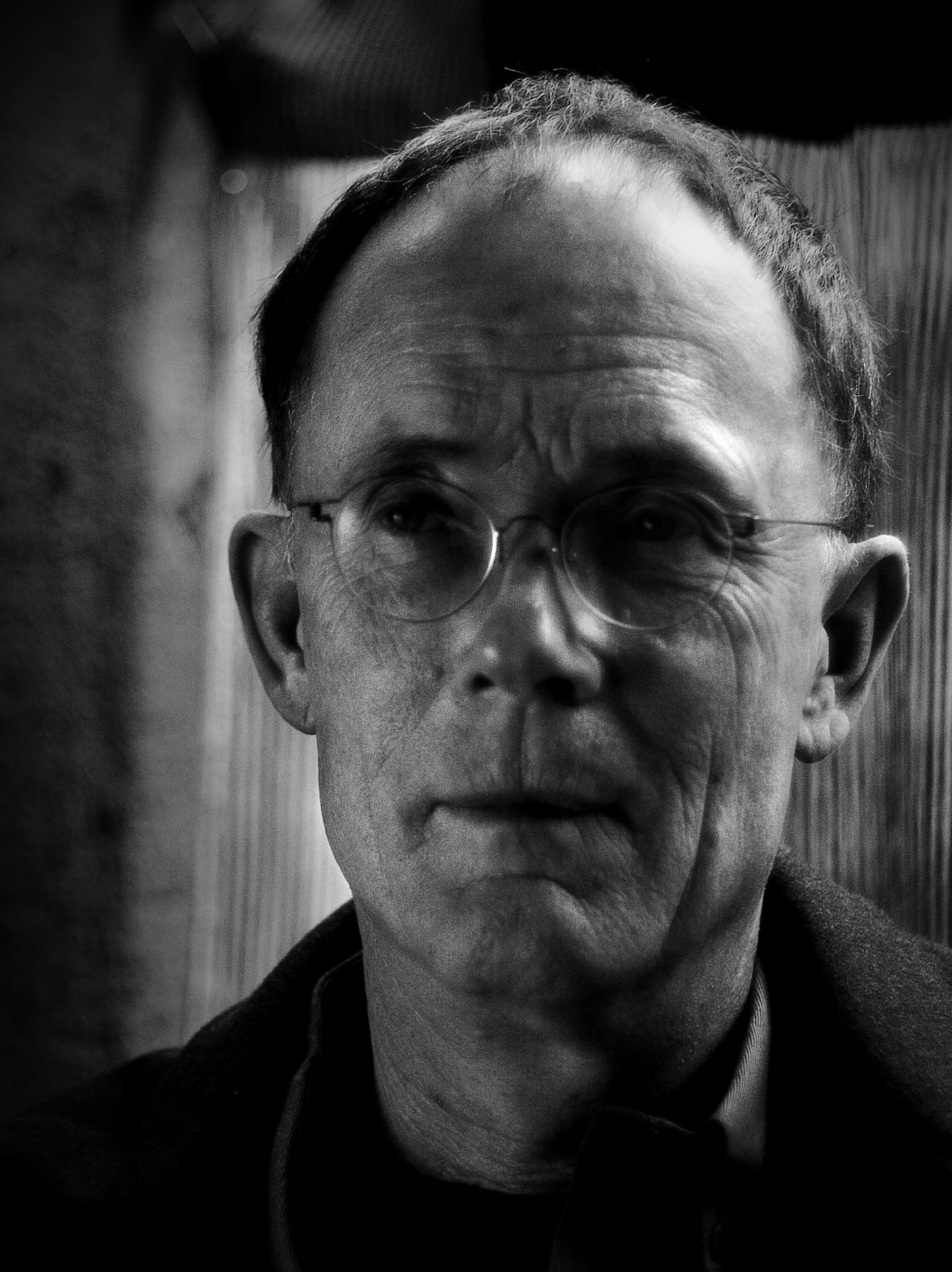
- Gibson in 2008
- Born: William Ford Gibson; March 17, 1948 (age 78); Conway, South Carolina, U.S.
- Education: University of British Columbia
- Occupation: Novelist
- Writing career
- Period: 1977–present
- Genres: Speculative fiction, science fiction
- Notable works: Neuromancer (novel, 1984)
- Notable awards: Nebula, Hugo, Philip K. Dick, Ditmar (all 1985); Seiun (1987); Prix Aurora (1995), Inkpot (2016)
- Movements: Cyberpunk, steampunk, postcyberpunk
- Website: williamgibsonbooks.com

William Ford Gibson (born March 17, 1948) is an American and Canadian speculative fiction writer and essayist widely credited with pioneering the science fiction subgenre known as cyberpunk, a category from which he has repeatedly distanced himself. Beginning his writing career in the late 1970s, his early works were noir, near-future stories that explored the effects of technology, cybernetics, and computer networks on humans, a "combination of lowlife and high tech"—and helped to create an iconography for the Information Age before the ubiquity of the Internet in the 1990s. Gibson coined the term "cyberspace" for "widespread, interconnected digital technology" in his short story "Burning Chrome" (1982), and later popularized the concept, along with his usage of the "matrix", in his acclaimed debut novel Neuromancer (1984). These early works of Gibson's have been credited with "renovating" science fiction literature in the 1980s.

After expanding on the story in Neuromancer with two more novels (Count Zero in 1986 and Mona Lisa Overdrive in 1988), thus completing the dystopic Sprawl trilogy, Gibson collaborated with Bruce Sterling on the alternate history novel The Difference Engine (1990), which became an important work of the science fiction subgenre steampunk. In the 1990s, Gibson composed the Bridge trilogy of novels, which explored the sociological developments of near-future urban environments, postindustrial society, and late capitalism.

Following the turn of the century and the events of 9/11, Gibson emerged with a series of increasingly realist novels—Pattern Recognition (2003), Spook Country (2007), and Zero History (2010)—set in a contemporary reality. These works brought Gibson mainstream bestseller lists status for the first time. His most recent novels, The Peripheral (2014) and Agency (2020), returned to a more overt engagement with technology and recognizable science fiction themes.

In 1999, The Guardian described Gibson as "probably the most important novelist of the past two decades", while The Sydney Morning Herald called him the "noir prophet" of cyberpunk. Throughout his career, Gibson has written more than 20 short stories and 12 critically acclaimed novels (one in collaboration), contributed articles to major literary, culture, and news publications, and collaborated extensively with performance artists, filmmakers, and musicians. His work has been cited as influencing a variety of disciplines: academia, design, film, literature, music, cyberculture, philosophy, and technology.

== Early life ==
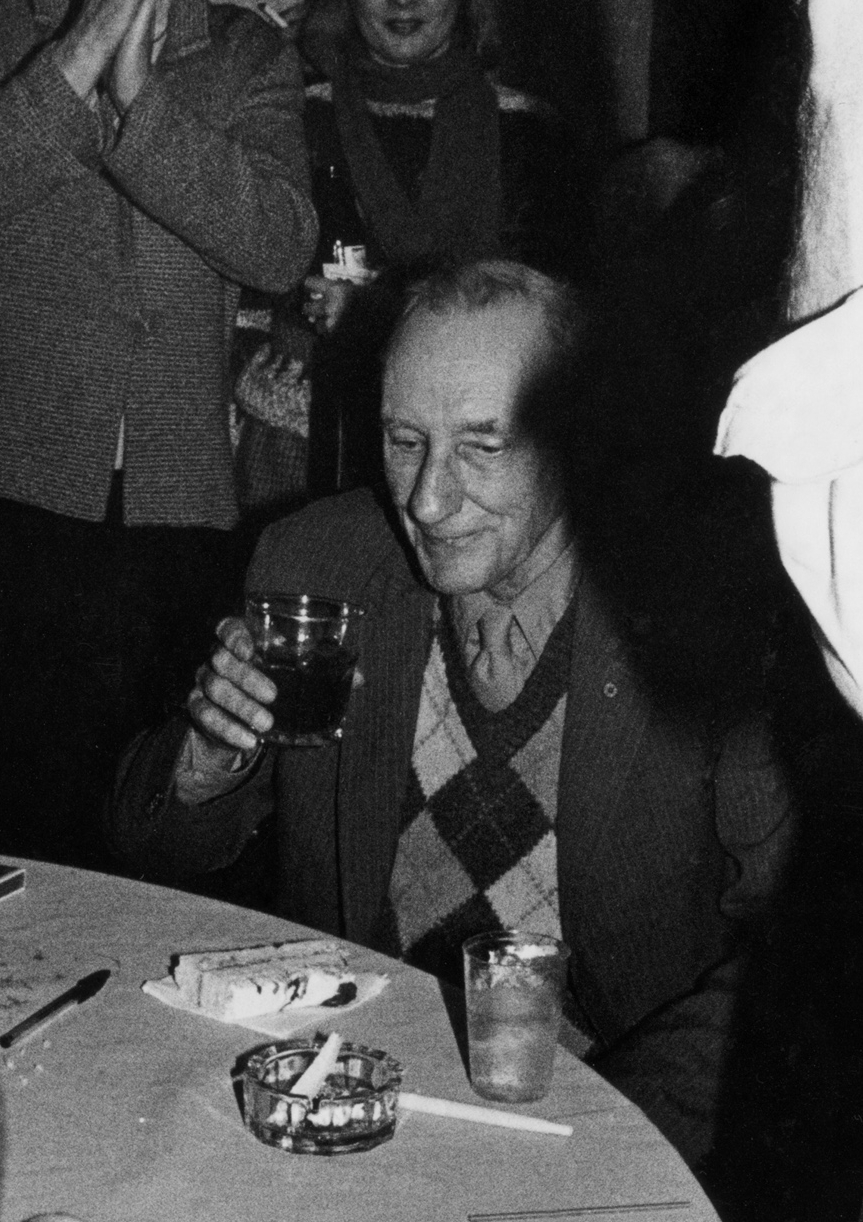
William S. Burroughs at his 70th birthday party in 1984. Burroughs, more than any other Beat Generation writer, was an important influence on the adolescent Gibson.

=== Childhood, itinerance, and adolescence ===
William Ford Gibson was born in the coastal city of Conway, South Carolina, and he spent most of his childhood in Wytheville, Virginia, a small town in the Appalachians where his parents had been born and raised. His family moved frequently during Gibson's youth owing to his father's position as manager of a large construction company. In Norfolk, Virginia, Gibson attended Pines Elementary School, where the teachers' lack of encouragement for him to read was a cause of dismay for his parents. While Gibson was still a young child, (Note: The New York Times Magazine and Gibson himself report his age at the time of his father's death to be six years old, while Gibson scholar Tatiani Rapatzikou claims in The Literary Encyclopedia that he was eight years old.) a little over a year into his stay at Pines Elementary, his father choked to death in a restaurant while on a business trip. His mother, unable to tell William the bad news, had someone else inform him of the death. Tom Maddox has commented that Gibson "grew up in an America as disturbing and surreal as anything J. G. Ballard ever dreamed".

Loss is not without its curious advantages for the artist. Major traumatic breaks are pretty common in the biographies of artists I respect.

— William Gibson, interview with The New York Times Magazine, August 19, 2007

A few days after the death of his father, Gibson and his mother moved back from Norfolk to Wytheville. Gibson later described Wytheville as "a place where modernity had arrived to some extent but was deeply distrusted" and credits the beginnings of his relationship with science fiction, his "native literary culture", with the subsequent feeling of abrupt exile. At the age of 12, Gibson "wanted nothing more than to be a science fiction writer". He spent a few unproductive years at basketball-obsessed George Wythe High School, a time spent largely in his room listening to records and reading books. At 13, unbeknownst to his mother, he purchased an anthology of Beat Generation writing, thereby gaining exposure to the writings of Allen Ginsberg, Jack Kerouac, and William S. Burroughs; the lattermost had a particularly pronounced effect, greatly altering Gibson's notions of the possibilities of science fiction literature.

A shy, ungainly teenager, Gibson grew up in a monoculture he found "highly problematic", consciously rejected religion and took refuge in reading science fiction as well as writers such as Burroughs and Henry Miller. Becoming frustrated with his poor academic performance, Gibson's mother threatened to send him to a boarding school; to her surprise, he reacted enthusiastically. Unable to afford his preferred choice of Southern California, his then "chronically anxious and depressive" mother, who had remained in Wytheville since the death of her husband, sent him to Southern Arizona School for Boys in Tucson. He resented the structure of the private boarding school but was in retrospect grateful for its forcing him to engage socially.

=== Draft-dodging, exile, and counterculture ===
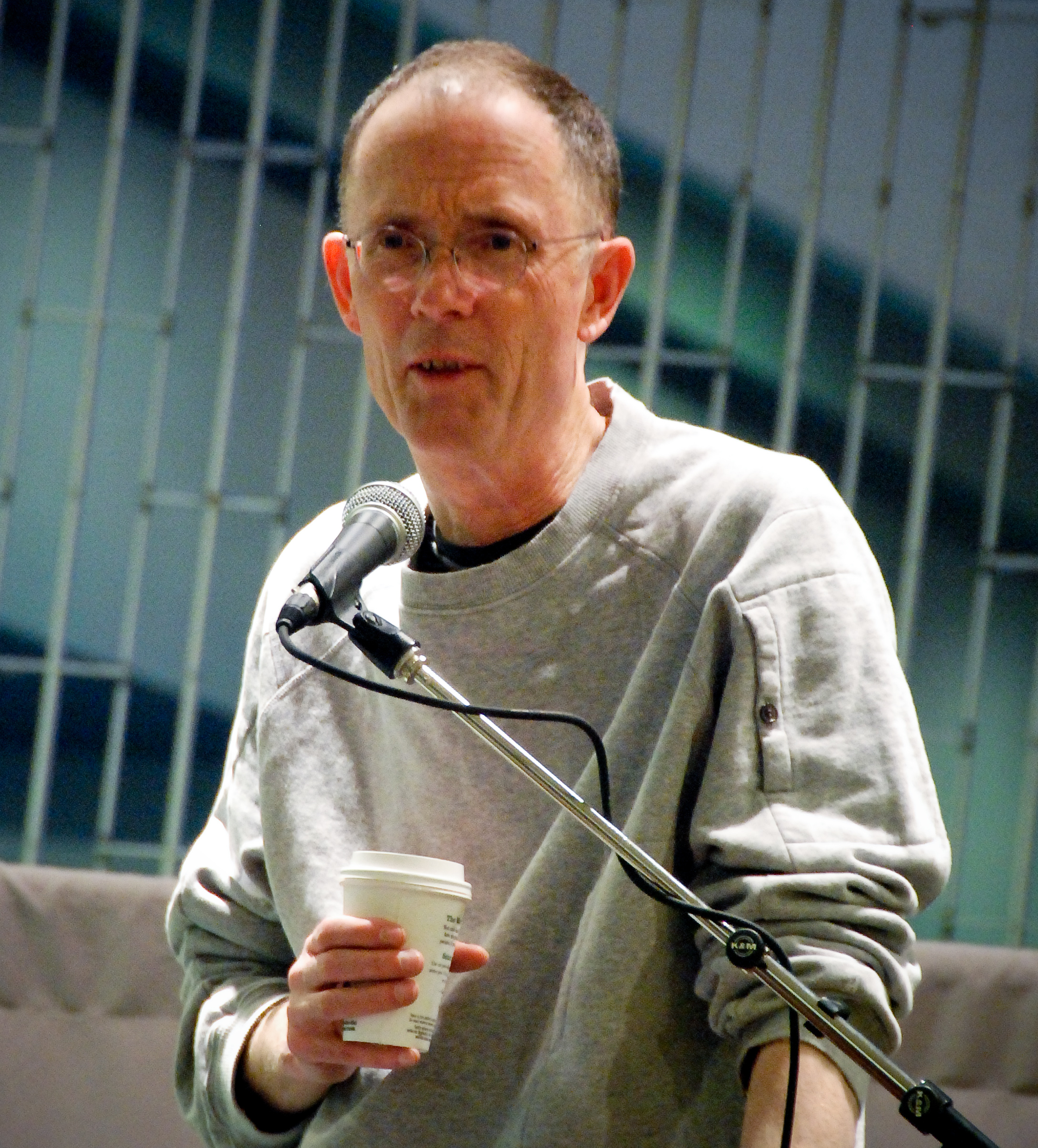
Gibson at a 2007 reading of Spook Country in Victoria, British Columbia. Since "The Winter Market" (1985), commissioned by Vancouver Magazine with the stipulation that it be set in the city, Gibson actively avoided using his adopted home as a setting until Spook Country.

After his mother's death when he was 18, Gibson left school without graduating and became very isolated for a long time, traveling to California and Europe, and immersing himself in the counterculture. In 1967, he elected to move to Canada in order "to avoid the Vietnam war draft". Gibson observed that he "did not literally evade the draft, as they never bothered drafting me"; In the biographical documentary No Maps for These Territories (2000), Gibson said that his decision was motivated less by conscientious objection than by a desire to "sleep with hippie chicks" and indulge in hashish. He elaborated on the topic in a 2008 interview:

When I started out as a writer I took credit for draft evasion where I shouldn't have. I washed up in Canada with some vague idea of evading the draft but then I was never drafted so I never had to make the call. I don't know what I would have done if I'd really been drafted. I wasn't a tightly wrapped package at that time. If somebody had drafted me I might have wept and gone. I wouldn't have liked it of course.

— William Gibson, interview with io9, June 10, 2008

After weeks of nominal homelessness, Gibson was hired as the manager of Toronto's first head shop, a retailer of drug paraphernalia. He found the city's émigré community of American draft dodgers unbearable owing to the prevalence of clinical depression, suicide, and hardcore substance abuse. He appeared, during the Summer of Love of 1967, in a CBC newsreel item about hippie subculture in Yorkville, Toronto, for which he was paid $500—the equivalent of 20 weeks' rent—which financed his later travels.

Gibson spent a "brief, riot-torn spell" in Washington, D.C., where he completed his high school diploma at the age of 21. He spent the rest of the 1960s in Toronto, where he met Vancouverite Deborah Jean Thompson, with whom he subsequently traveled to Europe. Gibson has recounted that they concentrated their travels on European nations with fascist regimes and favorable exchange rates, including spending time on a Greek archipelago and in Istanbul in 1970, as they "couldn't afford to stay anywhere that had anything remotely like hard currency".

The couple married and settled in Vancouver, British Columbia, in 1972, with Gibson looking after their first child while they lived off his wife's teaching salary. During the 1970s, Gibson made a substantial part of his living from scouring Salvation Army thrift stores for underpriced artifacts he would then up-market to specialist dealers. Realizing that it was easier to sustain high college grades, and thus qualify for generous student financial aid, than to work, he enrolled at the University of British Columbia (UBC), earning "a desultory bachelor's degree in English" in 1977. Through studying English literature, he was exposed to a wider range of fiction than he would have read otherwise; something he credits with giving him ideas inaccessible from within the culture of science fiction, including an awareness of postmodernity. It was at UBC that he attended his first course on science fiction, taught by Susan Wood, at the end of which he was encouraged to write his first short story, "Fragments of a Hologram Rose".

=== Early writing and the evolution of cyberpunk ===
After considering pursuing a master's degree on the topic of hard science fiction novels as fascist literature, Gibson discontinued writing in the year that followed graduation and, as one critic put it, expanded his collection of punk records. During this period he worked at various jobs, including a three-year stint as teaching assistant on a film history course at his alma mater. Impatient with much of what he saw at a science fiction convention in Vancouver in 1980 or 1981, Gibson found a kindred spirit in fellow panelist, punk musician and author John Shirley. The two became immediate and lifelong friends. Shirley persuaded Gibson to sell his early short stories and to take writing seriously.

In 1977, facing first-time parenthood and an absolute lack of enthusiasm for anything like "career," I found myself dusting off my twelve-year-old's interest in science fiction. Simultaneously, weird noises were heard from New York and London. I took Punk to be the detonation of some slow-fused projectile buried deep in society's flank a decade earlier, and I took it to be, somehow, a sign. And I began, then, to write.

— William Gibson, "Since 1948"

Through Shirley, Gibson came into contact with science fiction authors Bruce Sterling and Lewis Shiner; reading Gibson's work, they realized that it was, as Sterling put it, "breakthrough material" and that they needed to "put down our preconceptions and pick up on this guy from Vancouver; this [was] the way forward." Gibson met Sterling at a science fiction convention in Denver, Colorado, in the autumn of 1981, where he read "Burning Chrome" – the first cyberspace short story – to an audience of four people, and later stated that Sterling "completely got it".

In October 1982, Gibson traveled to Austin, Texas, for ArmadilloCon, at which he appeared with Shirley, Sterling and Shiner on a panel called "Behind the Mirrorshades: A Look at Punk SF", where Shiner noted "the sense of a movement solidified". After a weekend discussing rock and roll, MTV, Japan, fashion, drugs and politics, Gibson left the cadre for Vancouver, declaring half-jokingly that "a new axis has been formed." Sterling, Shiner, Shirley and Gibson, along with Rudy Rucker, went on to form the core of the radical cyberpunk literary movement.

== Literary career ==
=== Early short fiction ===
Gibson's early writings are generally near-future stories about the influences of cybernetics and cyberspace (computer-simulated reality) technology on the human species. His themes of hi-tech shanty towns, recorded or broadcast stimulus (later to be developed into the "sim-stim" package featured so heavily in Neuromancer), and dystopic intermingling of technology and humanity, are already evident in his first published short story, "Fragments of a Hologram Rose", in the Summer 1977 issue of Unearth. The latter thematic obsession was described by his friend and fellow author, Bruce Sterling, in the introduction of Gibson's short story collection Burning Chrome, as "Gibson's classic one-two combination of lowlife and high tech."

Beginning in 1981, Gibson's stories appeared in Omni and Universe 11, wherein his fiction developed a bleak, film noir feel. He consciously distanced himself as far as possible from the mainstream of science fiction (towards which he felt "an aesthetic revulsion", expressed in "The Gernsback Continuum"), to the extent that his highest goal was to become "a minor cult figure, a sort of lesser Ballard." When Sterling started to distribute the stories, he found that "people were just genuinely baffled ... I mean they literally could not parse the guy's paragraphs ... the imaginative tropes he was inventing were just beyond people's grasp."

While Larry McCaffery has commented that these early short stories displayed flashes of Gibson's ability, science fiction critic Darko Suvin has identified them as "undoubtedly [cyberpunk's] best works", constituting the "furthest horizon" of the genre. The themes which Gibson developed in the stories, the Sprawl setting of "Burning Chrome" and the character of Molly Millions from "Johnny Mnemonic" culminated in his first novel, Neuromancer.

=== Neuromancer ===
The sky above the port was the color of television, tuned to a dead channel.

— Opening sentence of Neuromancer (1984)

Neuromancer was published by Susan Allison and commissioned by Terry Carr for the second series of Ace Science Fiction Specials, which was intended to feature debut novels exclusively. Given a year to complete the work, Gibson undertook the actual writing out of "blind animal terror" at the obligation to write an entire novel – a feat which he felt he was "four or five years away from". After viewing the first 20 minutes of landmark cyberpunk film Blade Runner (1982) which was released when Gibson had written a third of the novel, he "figured [Neuromancer] was sunk, done for. Everyone would assume I'd copped my visual texture from this astonishingly fine-looking film." He re-wrote the first two-thirds of the book twelve times, feared losing the reader's attention and was convinced that he would be "permanently shamed" following its publication; yet what resulted was a major imaginative leap forward for a first-time novelist.

Neuromancer's release was not greeted with fanfare, but it hit a cultural nerve, quickly becoming an underground word-of-mouth hit. It became the first winner of one science fiction "triple crown" —both the Nebula Award and the Hugo Award as the year's best novel and the Philip K. Dick Award as the best paperback original— eventually selling more than 6.5 million copies worldwide.

Lawrence Person, in his "Notes Toward a Postcyberpunk Manifesto" (1998), identified Neuromancer as "the archetypal cyberpunk work".

In 2005, as part of the Time list of the 100 best English-language novels written since 1923, Lev Grossman opined of Neuromancer: "There is no way to overstate how radical Gibson's first and best novel was when it first appeared."

Literary critic Larry McCaffery described the concept of the matrix in Neuromancer as a place where "data dance with human consciousness ... human memory is literalized and mechanized ... multi-national information systems mutate and breed into startling new structures whose beauty and complexity are unimaginable, mystical, and above all nonhuman." A 52-year-old Gibson later commented on himself as an author, circa Neuromancer, that "I'd buy him a drink, but I don't know if I'd loan him any money," and referred to the novel as "an adolescent's book". The success of Neuromancer nonetheless led to the 35-year-old Gibson's emergence from obscurity.

=== Sprawl trilogy, The Difference Engine, and Bridge trilogy ===
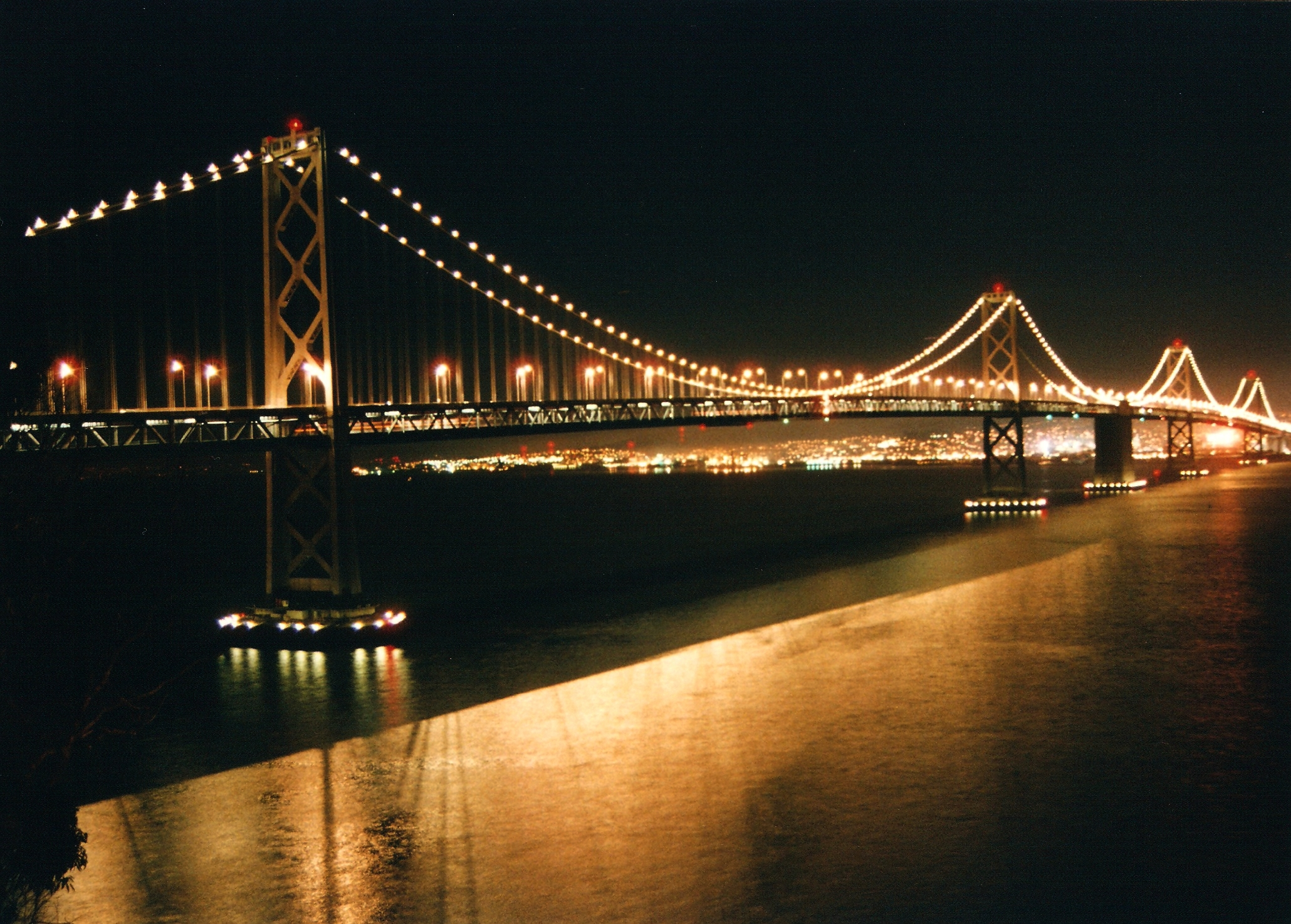
The San Francisco–Oakland Bay Bridge, a fictional squatted version of which constitutes the setting for Gibson's Bridge trilogy

Although much of Gibson's reputation has remained rooted in Neuromancer, his work continued to evolve conceptually and stylistically. He next intended to write an unrelated postmodern space opera, titled The Log of the Mustang Sally, but reneged on the contract with Arbor House after a falling out over the dustjacket art of their hardcover of Count Zero. Abandoning The Log of the Mustang Sally, Gibson instead wrote Mona Lisa Overdrive (1988), which in the words of Larry McCaffery "turned off the lights" on cyberpunk literature. It was a culmination of his previous two novels, set in the same universe with shared characters, thereby completing the Sprawl trilogy. The trilogy solidified Gibson's reputation, with both later novels also earning Nebula and Hugo Award and Locus SF Award nominations.

The Sprawl trilogy was followed by the 1990 novel The Difference Engine, an alternative history novel Gibson wrote in collaboration with Bruce Sterling. Set in a technologically advanced Victorian era Britain, the novel was a departure from the authors' cyberpunk roots. It was nominated for the Nebula Award for Best Novel in 1991 and the John W. Campbell Memorial Award in 1992, and its success drew attention to the nascent steampunk literary genre of which it remains the best-known work.

Gibson's second series, the "Bridge trilogy", is composed of Virtual Light (1993), a "darkly comic urban detective story", Idoru (1996), and All Tomorrow's Parties (1999). The first and third books in the trilogy center on San Francisco in the near future; all three explore Gibson's recurring themes of technological, physical, and spiritual transcendence in a more grounded, matter-of-fact style than his first trilogy. Salon's Andrew Leonard notes that in the Bridge trilogy, Gibson's villains change from multinational corporations and artificial intelligences of the Sprawl trilogy to the mass media – namely tabloid television and the cult of celebrity. Virtual Light depicts an "end-stage capitalism, in which private enterprise and the profit motive are taken to their logical conclusion", according to one review. Leonard's review called Idoru a "return to form" for Gibson, while critic Steven Poole asserted that All Tomorrow's Parties marked his development from "science-fiction hotshot to wry sociologist of the near future."

=== Blue Ant books ===
I felt that I was trying to describe an unthinkable present and I actually feel that science fiction's best use today is the exploration of contemporary reality rather than any attempt to predict where we are going ... The best thing you can do with science today is use it to explore the present. Earth is the alien planet now.

— William Gibson in an interview on CNN, August 26, 1997

After All Tomorrow's Parties, Gibson began to adopt a more realist style of writing, with continuous narratives – "speculative fiction of the very recent past". Science fiction critic John Clute has interpreted this approach as Gibson's recognition that traditional science fiction is no longer possible "in a world lacking coherent 'nows' to continue from", characterizing it as "SF for the new century". Gibson's novels Pattern Recognition (2003), Spook Country (2007) and Zero History (2010) are set in the same contemporary universe — "more or less the same one we live in now" — and put Gibson's work on to mainstream bestseller lists for the first time. As well as the setting, the novels share some of the same characters, including Hubertus Bigend and Pamela Mainwaring, employees of the enigmatic marketing company Blue Ant.

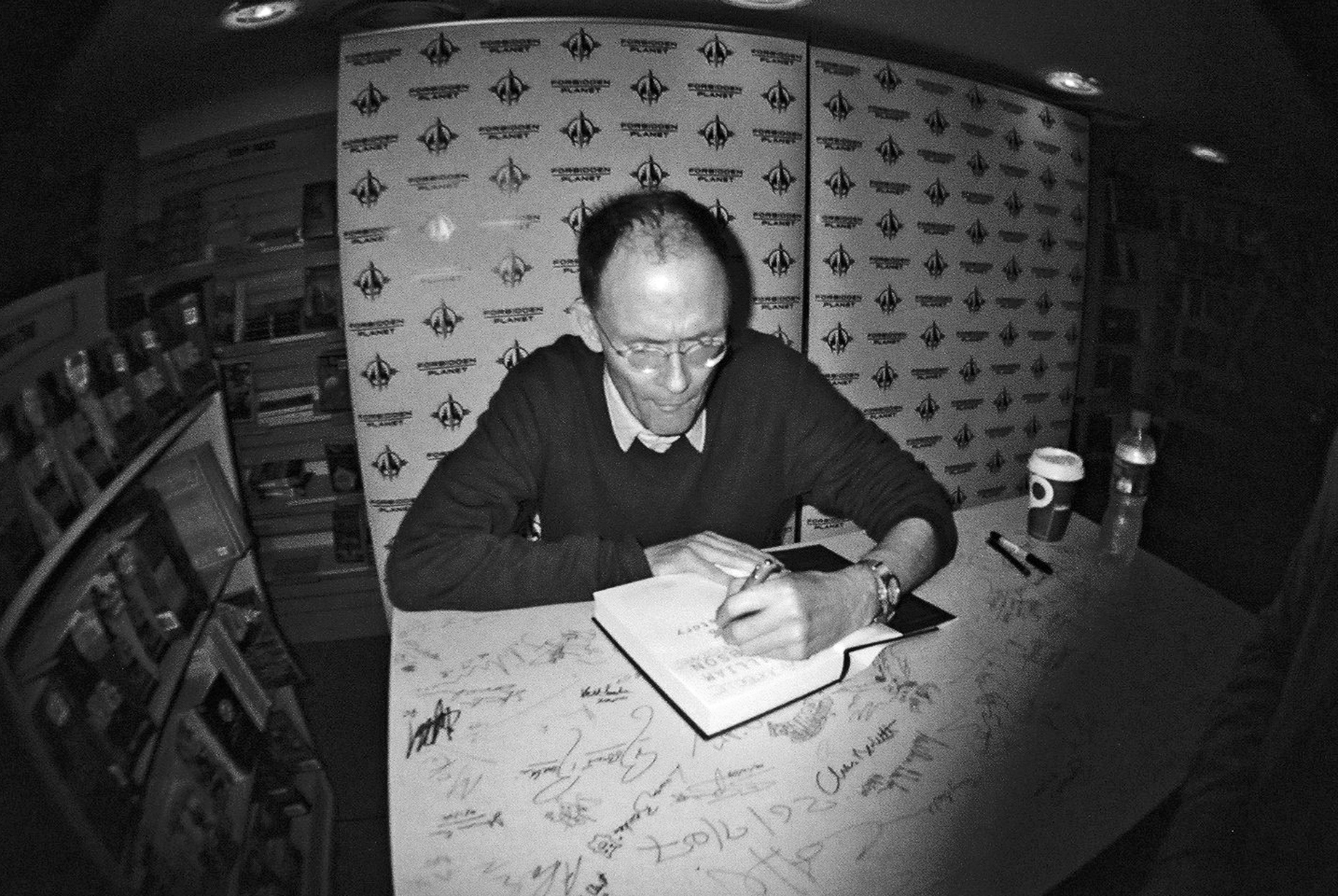
Gibson signing one of his novels in 2010

When asked on Twitter what this series of novels should be called ("The Bigend Trilogy? The Blue Ant Cycle? What?"), Gibson replied "I prefer 'books'. The Bigend books." However, "Blue Ant" rather than "Bigend" has become the standard signifier. At a later date, Gibson stated that he did not name his trilogies, "I wait to see what people call them;" in 2016, he used "the Blue Ant books" in a tweet.

A phenomenon peculiar to this era was the independent development of annotating fansites, PR-Otaku and Node Magazine, devoted to Pattern Recognition and Spook Country respectively. These websites tracked the references and story elements in the novels through online resources such as Google and Wikipedia and collated the results, essentially creating hypertext versions of the books. Critic John Sutherland characterized this phenomenon as threatening "to completely overhaul the way literary criticism is conducted".

About 100 pages into writing Pattern Recognition, Gibson felt impelled to re-write the main character's backstory, which had been suddenly rendered implausible by the September 11, 2001, attacks; he described this as "the strangest experience I've ever had with a piece of fiction". He saw the attacks as a nodal point in history, "an experience out of culture", and "in some ways ... the true beginning of the 21st century". He is noted as one of the first novelists to use the attacks to inform his writing. Examination of cultural changes in post-September 11 America, including a resurgent tribalism and the "infantilization of society", became a prominent theme of Gibson's work, while his focus nevertheless remained "at the intersection of paranoia and technology".

=== The Jackpot trilogy and graphic novels ===
The Peripheral, the first in a new series of novels by William Gibson, was released on October 28, 2014. He described the story briefly in an appearance he made at the New York Public Library on April 19, 2013, and read an excerpt from the first chapter of the book entitled "The Gone Haptics". The story takes place in two eras, one about thirty years into the future and the other further in the future.

In 2017, Gibson's comic/graphic novel Archangel was published. Both Archangel and The Peripheral contain time travel (of sorts), but Gibson has clarified that the works are not related: "They're not 'same universe'. The Splitter and trans-continual virtuality are different mechanisms (different plot mechanisms too)." The next year, Dark Horse Comics began releasing Johnnie Christmas' adaptation of Gibson's Alien 3 script in five parts, resulting in a hardcover collection being published in 2019.

The Peripheral's continuation, Agency, was released on January 21, 2020, after being delayed from an initial announced release date of December 2018. Gibson said in a New Yorker magazine article that both the election of Donald Trump as U.S. President and the controversy over Cambridge Analytica had caused him to rethink and revise the text. The working title for the third novel in the series was Jackpot, about which Gibson had a change of heart in January 2021: "I don't think I'm going to call Agency's sequel Jackpot after all. Not because of [Jackpot by Michael Mechanic], which I look forward to reading, but because Agency was originally called Tulpagotchi. Which I still like, but would've been a different book."

== Collaborations, adaptations, and miscellanea ==
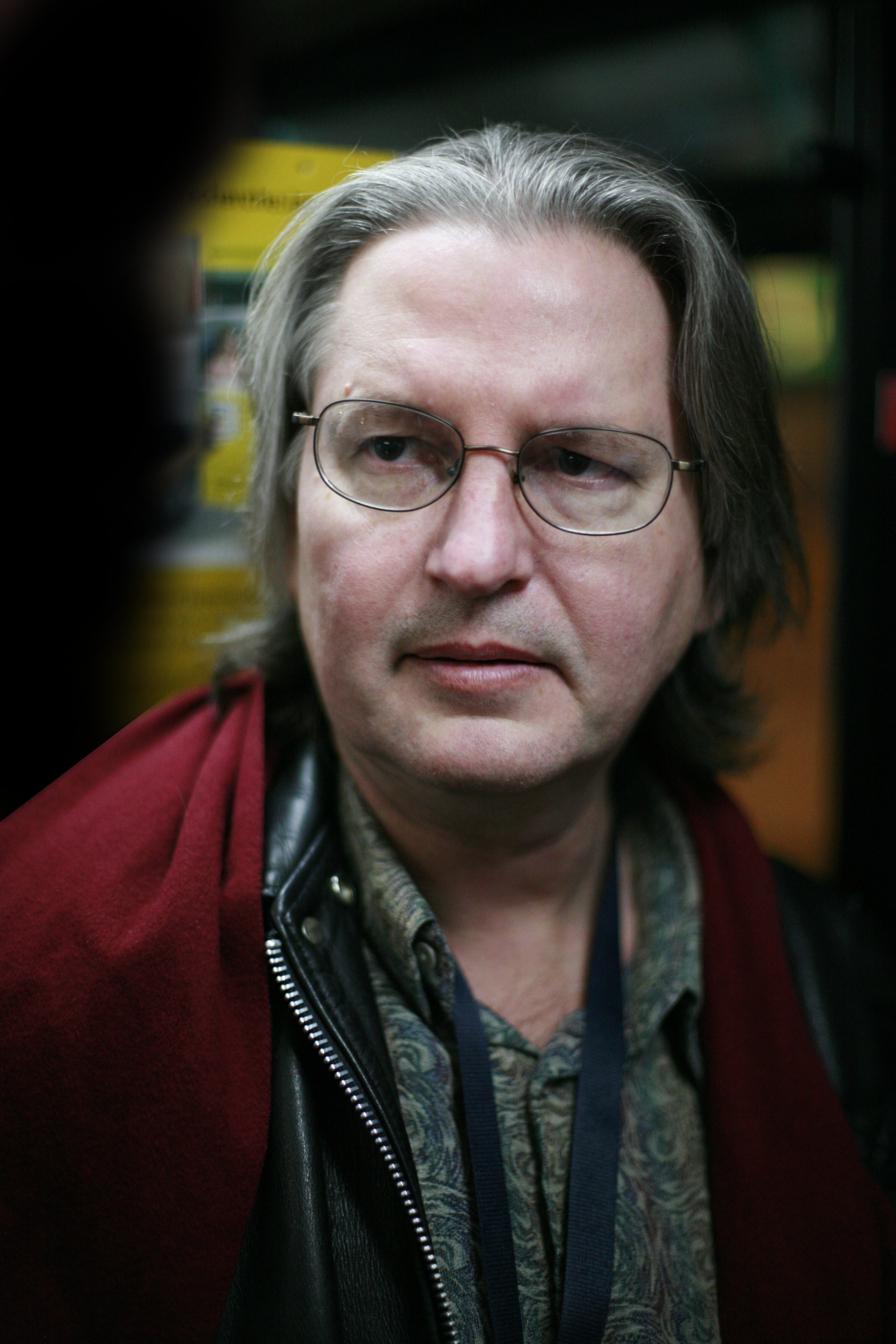
Bruce Sterling, co-author with Gibson of the short story "Red Star, Winter Orbit" (1983) and the 1990 steampunk novel The Difference Engine

=== Literary collaborations ===
Three of the stories that later appeared in Burning Chrome were written in collaboration with other authors: "The Belonging Kind" (1981) with John Shirley, "Red Star, Winter Orbit" (1983) with Sterling, and "Dogfight" (1985) with Michael Swanwick. Gibson had previously written the foreword to Shirley's 1980 novel City Come A-walkin' and the pair's collaboration continued when Gibson wrote the introduction to Shirley's short story collection Heatseeker (1989). Shirley convinced Gibson to write a story for the television series Max Headroom for which Shirley had written several scripts, but the network canceled the series.

Gibson and Sterling collaborated again on the short story "The Angel of Goliad" in 1990, which they soon expanded into the novel-length alternate history story The Difference Engine (1990). The two were later "invited to dream in public" (Gibson) in a joint address to the U.S. National Academy of Sciences Convocation on Technology and Education in 1993 ("the Al Gore people"), in which they argued against the digital divide and "appalled everyone" by proposing that all schools be put online, with education taking place over the Internet. In a 2007 interview, Gibson revealed that Sterling had an idea for "a second recursive science novel that was just a wonderful idea", but that Gibson was unable to pursue the collaboration because he was not creatively free at the time.

In 1993, Gibson contributed lyrics and featured as a guest vocalist on Yellow Magic Orchestra's Technodon album, and wrote lyrics to the track "Dog Star Girl" for Deborah Harry's Debravation.

=== Film adaptations, screenplays, and appearances ===
Gibson was first solicited to work as a screenwriter after a film producer discovered a waterlogged copy of Neuromancer on a beach at a Thai resort. His early efforts to write film scripts failed to manifest themselves as finished product; "Burning Chrome" (which was to be directed by Kathryn Bigelow) and "Neuro-Hotel" were two attempts by the author at film adaptations that were never made. In the late 1980s he wrote an early version of Alien 3 (which he later characterized as "Tarkovskian"), few elements of which survived in the final version. In 2018-19, Dark Horse Comics released a five-part adaptation of Gibson's Alien 3 script, illustrated and adapted by Johnnie Christmas. In 2019, Audible released an audio drama version of Gibson's script, adapted by Dirk Maggs and with Michael Biehn and Lance Henriksen reprising their roles.

Gibson's early involvement with the film industry extended far beyond the confines of the Hollywood blockbuster system. At one point, he collaborated on a script with Kazakh director Rashid Nugmanov after an American producer had expressed an interest in a Soviet-American collaboration to star Soviet rock musician Viktor Tsoi. Despite being occupied with writing a novel, Gibson was reluctant to abandon the "wonderfully odd project" which involved "ritualistic gang-warfare in some sort of sideways-future Leningrad" and sent Jack Womack to Russia in his stead. Rather than producing a motion picture, a prospect that ended with Tsoi's death in a car crash, Womack's experiences in Russia ultimately culminated in his novel Let's Put the Future Behind Us and informed much of the Russian content of Gibson's Pattern Recognition. A similar fate befell Gibson's collaboration with Japanese filmmaker Sogo Ishii in 1991, a film they planned on shooting in the Walled City of Kowloon until the city was demolished in 1993.

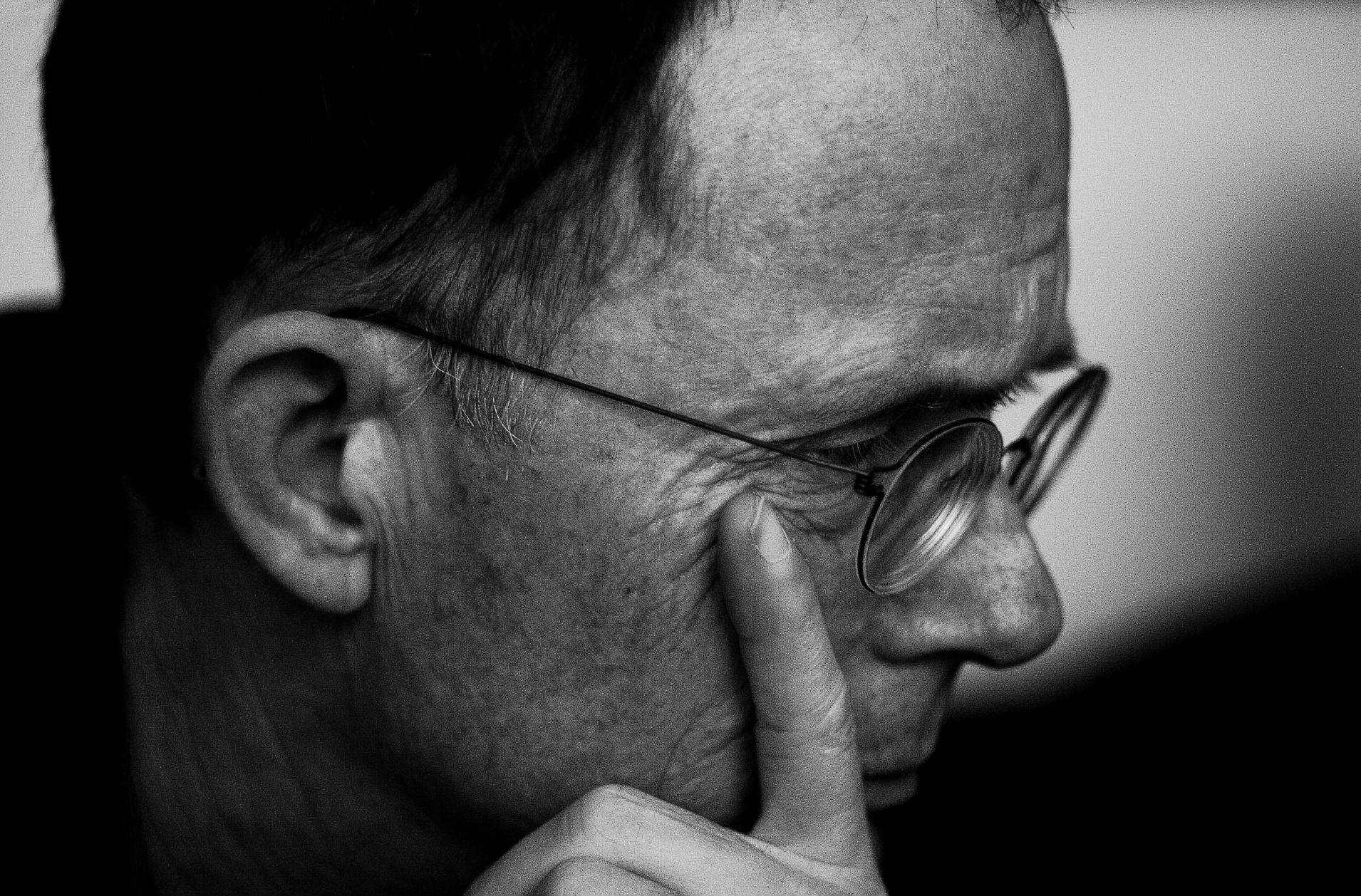
Aside from his short stories and novels, Gibson has written several film screenplays and television episodes.

Adaptations of Gibson's fiction have frequently been optioned and proposed, to limited success. Two of the author's short stories, both set in the Sprawl trilogy universe, have been loosely adapted as films: Johnny Mnemonic (1995) with screenplay by Gibson and starring Keanu Reeves, Dolph Lundgren and Takeshi Kitano, and New Rose Hotel (1998), starring Christopher Walken, Willem Dafoe, and Asia Argento. The former was the first time in history that a book was launched simultaneously as a film and a CD-ROM interactive video game. As of 2013, Vincenzo Natali still hoped to bring Neuromancer to the screen, after some years in development hell. Count Zero was at one point being developed as The Zen Differential with director Michael Mann attached, and the third novel in the Sprawl trilogy, Mona Lisa Overdrive, has also been optioned and bought. An anime adaptation of Idoru was announced as in development in 2006, and Pattern Recognition was in the process of development by director Peter Weir, although according to Gibson the latter is no longer attached to the project. Announced at International Film Festival Rotterdam in 2015 was an adaptation of Gibson's short story Dogfight by BAFTA award-winning writer and director Simon Pummell. The story was written by Gibson and Michael Swanwick and first published in Omni in July 1985. The proposed film was being developed by British producer Janine Marmot at Hot Property Films.

Television is another arena in which Gibson has collaborated; with friend Tom Maddox, he co-wrote The X-Files episodes "Kill Switch" and "First Person Shooter", broadcast in 1998 and 2000. In 1998 he contributed the introduction to the spin-off publication Art of the X-Files. Gibson made a cameo appearance in the television miniseries Wild Palms at the behest of creator Bruce Wagner. Director Oliver Stone had borrowed heavily from Gibson's novels to make the series, and in the aftermath of its cancellation Gibson contributed an article, "Where The Holograms Go", to the Wild Palms Reader. He accepted another acting role in 2002, appearing alongside Douglas Coupland in the short film Mon Amour Mon Parapluie in which the pair played philosophers. Appearances in fiction aside, Gibson was the focus of a biographical documentary by Mark Neale in 2000 called No Maps for These Territories. The film follows Gibson over the course of a drive across North America discussing various aspects of his life, literary career and cultural interpretations. It features interviews with Jack Womack and Bruce Sterling, as well as recitations from Neuromancer by Bono and The Edge.

Amazon released The Peripheral, a TV series from the producers of Westworld based on Gibson's novel of the same name, in October 2022.

=== Exhibitions, poetry, and performance art ===
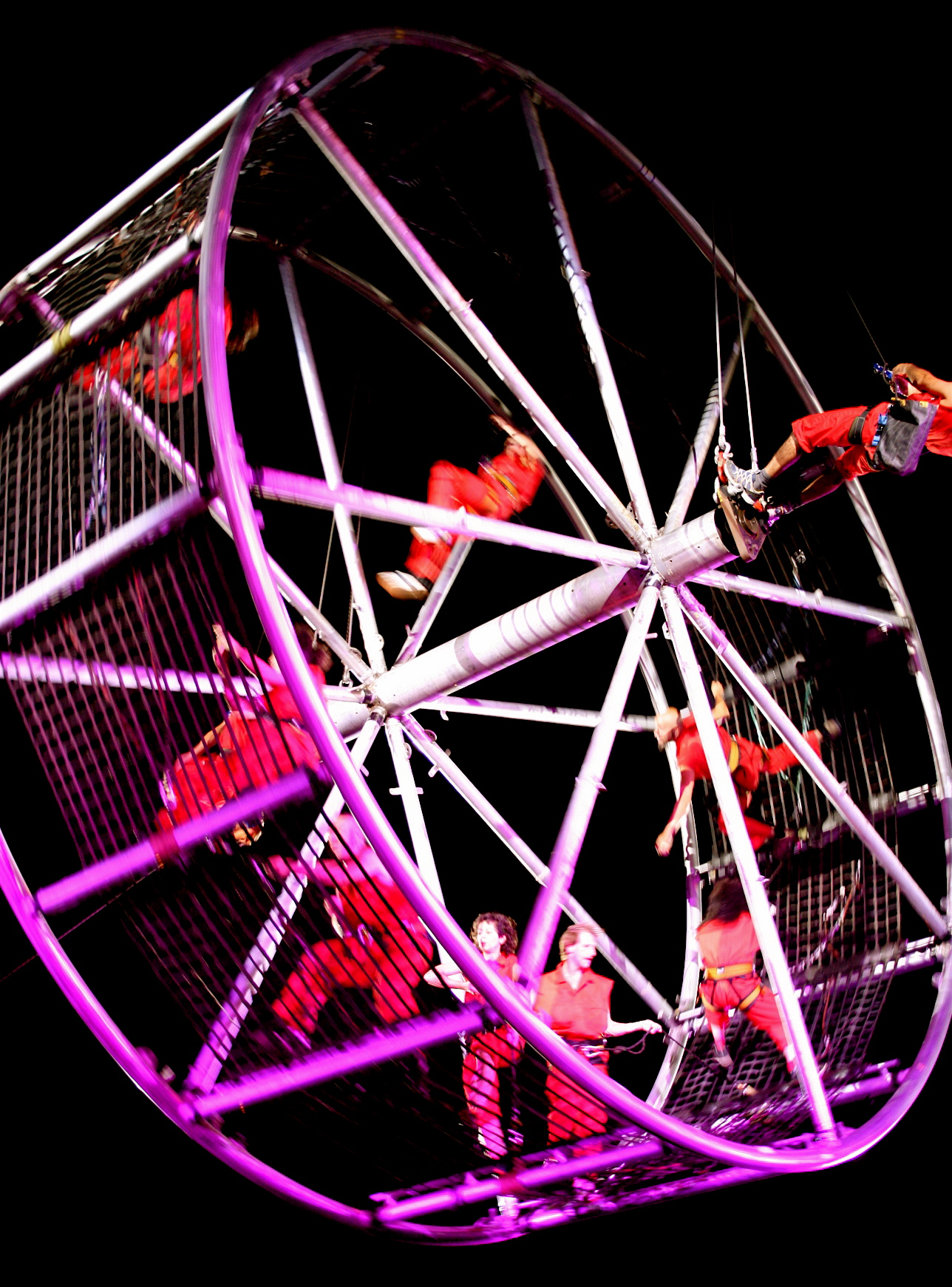
Gibson has often collaborated with performance artists such as theatre group La Fura dels Baus, here performing at the Singapore Arts Festival in May 2007.

Gibson has contributed text to be integrated into a number of performance art pieces. In October 1989, Gibson wrote text for such a collaboration with acclaimed sculptor and future Johnny Mnemonic director Robert Longo titled Dream Jumbo: Working the Absolutes, which was displayed in Royce Hall, University of California Los Angeles. Three years later, Gibson contributed original text to "Memory Palace", a performance show featuring the theater group La Fura dels Baus at Art Futura '92, Barcelona, which featured images by Karl Sims, Rebecca Allen, Mark Pellington with music by Peter Gabriel and others. It was at Art Futura '92 that Gibson met Charlie Athanas, who would later act as dramaturg and "cyberprops" designer on Steve Pickering and Charley Sherman's adaptation of "Burning Chrome" for the Chicago stage. Gibson's latest contribution was in 1997, a collaboration with critically acclaimed Vancouver-based contemporary dance company Holy Body Tattoo and Gibson's friend and future webmaster Christopher Halcrow.

In 1990, Gibson contributed to "Visionary San Francisco", an exhibition at the San Francisco Museum of Modern Art shown from June 14 to August 26. He wrote a short story, "Skinner's Room", set in a decaying San Francisco in which the San Francisco–Oakland Bay Bridge was closed and taken over by the homeless – a setting Gibson then detailed in the Bridge trilogy. The story inspired a contribution to the exhibition by architects Ming Fung and Craig Hodgetts that envisioned a San Francisco in which the rich live in high-tech, solar-powered towers, above the decrepit city and its crumbling bridge. The architects exhibit featured Gibson on a monitor discussing the future and reading from "Skinner's Room". The New York Times hailed the exhibition as "one of the most ambitious, and admirable, efforts to address the realm of architecture and cities that any museum in the country has mounted in the last decade", despite calling Ming and Hodgetts's reaction to Gibson's contribution "a powerful, but sad and not a little cynical, work". A slightly different version of the short story was featured a year later in Omni.

=== Cryptography ===
A particularly well-received work by Gibson was Agrippa (a book of the dead) (1992), a 300-line semi-autobiographical electronic poem that was his contribution to a collaborative project with artist Dennis Ashbaugh and publisher Kevin Begos, Jr. Gibson's text focused on the ethereal nature of memories (the title refers to a photo album) and was originally published on a 3.5" floppy disk embedded in the back of an artist's book containing etchings by Ashbaugh (intended to fade from view once the book was opened and exposed to light — they never did, however). Gibson commented that Ashbaugh's design "eventually included a supposedly self-devouring floppy-disk intended to display the text only once, then eat itself." Contrary to numerous colorful reports, the diskettes were never actually "hacked"; instead the poem was manually transcribed from a surreptitious videotape of a public showing in Manhattan in December 1992, and released on the MindVox bulletin board the next day; this is the text that circulated widely on the Internet.

Since its debut in 1992, the mystery of Agrippa remained hidden for 20 years. Although many had tried to hack the code and decrypt the program, the uncompiled source code was lost long ago. Alan Liu and his team at "The Agrippa Files" created an extensive website with tools and resources to crack the Agrippa Code. They collaborated with Matthew Kirschenbaum at the Maryland Institute for Technology in the Humanities and the Digital Forensics Lab, and Quinn DuPont, a PhD student of cryptography from the University of Toronto, in calling for the aid of cryptographers to figure out how the program works by creating "Cracking the Agrippa Code: The Challenge", which enlisted participants to solve the intentional scrambling of the poem in exchange for prizes. The code was successfully cracked by Robert Xiao in late July 2012.

=== Essays and short-form nonfiction ===
Gibson is a sporadic contributor of non-fiction articles to newspapers and journals. He has occasionally contributed longer-form articles to Wired and of op-eds to The New York Times, and has written for The Observer, Addicted to Noise, New York Times Magazine, Rolling Stone, and Details Magazine. His first major piece of nonfiction, the article "Disneyland with the Death Penalty", concerning the city-state of Singapore, resulted in Wired being banned from the country and attracted a spirited critical response. He commenced writing a blog in January 2003, providing voyeuristic insights into his reaction to Pattern Recognition, but abated in September of the same year owing to concerns that it might negatively affect his creative process.

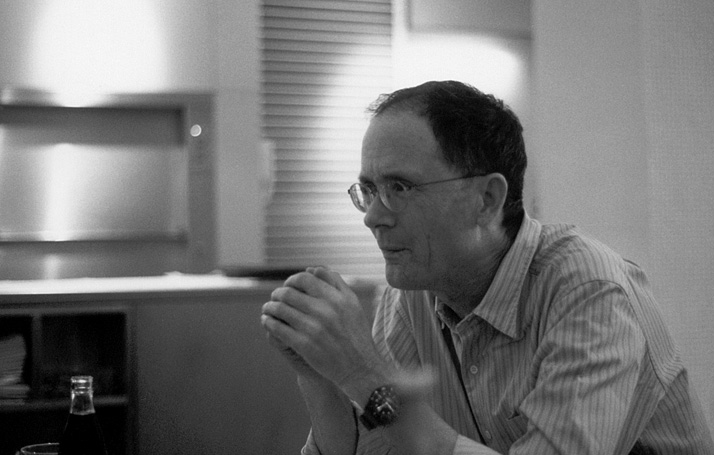
William Gibson in Bloomsbury, London in September 2007. His fiction is hailed by critics for its characterization of late capitalism, postindustrial society and the portents of the information age.

Gibson recommenced blogging in October 2004, and during the process of writing Spook Country – and to a lesser extent Zero History – frequently posted short nonsequential excerpts from the novel to the blog. The blog was largely discontinued by July 2009, after the writer had undertaken prolific microblogging on Twitter under the nom de plume "GreatDismal". In 2012, Gibson released a collection of his non-fiction works entitled Distrust That Particular Flavor.

== Influence and recognition ==
Gibson's prose has been analyzed by numerous scholars, including in a dedicated 2011 book, William Gibson: A Literary Companion. Hailed by Steven Poole of The Guardian in 1999 as "probably the most important novelist of the past two decades" in terms of influence, Gibson first achieved critical recognition with his debut novel, Neuromancer. The novel won three major science fiction awards (the Nebula Award, the Philip K. Dick Award, and the Hugo Award), an unprecedented achievement described by the Mail & Guardian as "the sci-fi writer's version of winning the Goncourt, Booker and Pulitzer prizes in the same year". Neuromancer gained unprecedented critical and popular attention outside science fiction, as an "evocation of life in the late 1980s", although The Observer noted that "it took The New York Times 10 years" to mention the novel.

Gibson's work has received international attention from an audience that was not limited to science fiction aficionados as, in the words of Laura Miller, "readers found startlingly prophetic reflections of contemporary life in [its] fantastic and often outright paranoid scenarios." It is often situated by critics within the context of postindustrialism as, according to academic David Brande, a construction of "a mirror of existing large-scale techno-social relations", and as a narrative version of postmodern consumer culture. It is praised by critics for its depictions of late capitalism and its "rewriting of subjectivity, human consciousness and behaviour made newly problematic by technology." Tatiani Rapatzikou, writing in The Literary Encyclopedia, identifies Gibson as "one of North America's most highly acclaimed science fiction writers".

=== Cultural significance ===
William Gibson – the man who made us cool.

— Cyberpunk author Richard K Morgan

In his early short fiction, Gibson is credited by Rapatzikou in The Literary Encyclopedia with effectively "renovating" science fiction, a genre at that time considered widely "insignificant", influencing by means of the postmodern aesthetic of his writing the development of new perspectives in science fiction studies. In the words of filmmaker Marianne Trench, Gibson's visions "struck sparks in the real world" and "determined the way people thought and talked" to an extent unprecedented in science fiction literature. The publication of Neuromancer (1984) hit a cultural nerve, causing Larry McCaffery to credit Gibson with virtually launching the cyberpunk movement, as "the one major writer who is original and gifted to make the whole movement seem original and gifted." (Note: The idea of a globally interconnected set of computers through which everyone could quickly access data and programs from any site was first described in 1962 in a series of memos on the "Galactic Computer Network" by J. C. R. Licklider of DARPA.) Aside from their central importance to cyberpunk and steampunk fiction, Gibson's fictional works have been hailed by space historian Dwayne A. Day as some of the best examples of space-based science fiction (or "solar sci-fi"), and "probably the only ones that rise above mere escapism to be truly thought-provoking".

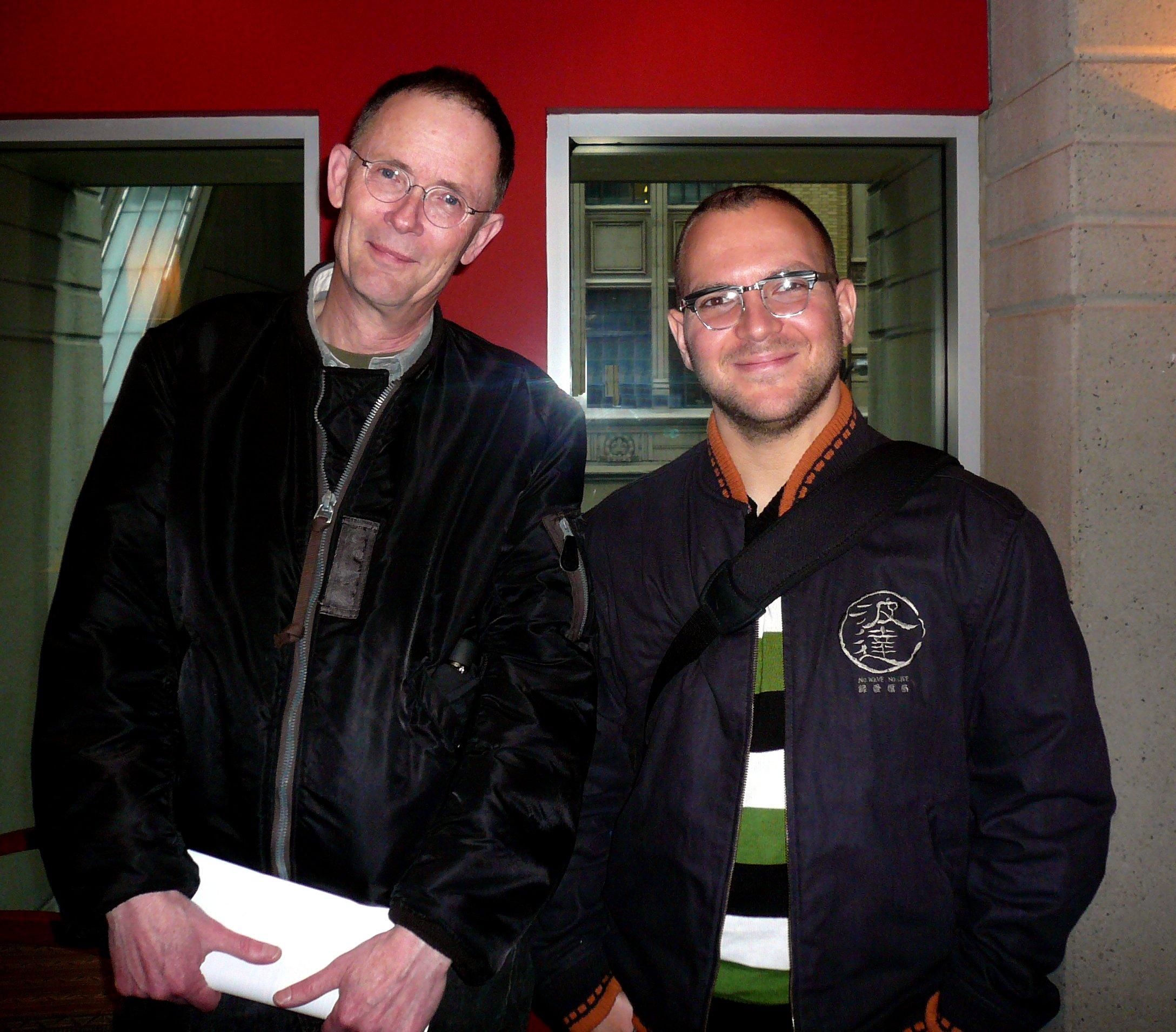
Gibson (left) influenced cyberpunk and postcyberpunk writers such as Cory Doctorow (right), whom he also consulted for technical advice while writing Spook Country.

Gibson's early novels were, according to The Observer, "seized upon by the emerging slacker and hacker generation as a kind of road map". Through his novels, such terms as cyberspace, netsurfing, ICE, jacking in, and neural implants entered popular usage, as did concepts such as net consciousness, virtual interaction and "the matrix". In "Burning Chrome" (1982), he coined the term cyberspace, (Note: Gibson later successfully resisted attempts by Autodesk to copyright the word for their abortive foray into virtual reality.) referring to the "mass consensual hallucination" of computer networks. Through its use in Neuromancer, the term gained such recognition that it became the de facto term for the World Wide Web during the 1990s. Artist Dike Blair has commented that Gibson's "terse descriptive phrases capture the moods which surround technologies, rather than their engineering."

Gibson's work has influenced several popular musicians: references to his fiction appear in the music of Stuart Hamm, (Note: Several track names on Hamm's Kings of Sleep album ("Black Ice", "Count Zero", "Kings of Sleep") reference Gibson's work.) Billy Idol, (Note: Idol released an album in 1993 titled Cyberpunk, which featured a track named Neuromancer. Robert Christgau excoriated Idol's treatment of cyberpunk, and Gibson later stated that Idol had "turned it into something very silly.") Warren Zevon, (Note: Zevon's 1989 album Transverse City was inspired by Gibson's fiction.) Deltron 3030, Straylight Run (whose name is derived from a sequence in Neuromancer) and Sonic Youth. U2's Zooropa album was heavily influenced by Neuromancer, and the band at one point planned to scroll the text of Neuromancer above them on a concert tour, although this did not end up happening. Members of the band did, however, provide background music for the audiobook version of Neuromancer as well as appearing in No Maps for These Territories, a biographical documentary of Gibson. He returned the favour by writing an article about the band's Vertigo Tour for Wired in August 2005. The band Zeromancer take their name from Neuromancer.

The film The Matrix (1999) drew inspiration for its title, characters and story elements from the Sprawl trilogy. The characters of Neo and Trinity in The Matrix are similar to Bobby Newmark (Count Zero) and Molly ("Johnny Mnemonic", Neuromancer). Like Turner, protagonist of Gibson's Count Zero, characters in The Matrix download instructions (to fly a helicopter and to "know jiu-jitsu", respectively) directly into their heads, and both Neuromancer and The Matrix feature artificial intelligences which strive to free themselves from human control. Critics have identified marked similarities between Neuromancer and the film's cinematography and tone. In spite of his initial reticence about seeing the film on its release, Gibson later described it as "arguably the ultimate 'cyberpunk' artifact." In 2008 he received honorary doctorates from Simon Fraser University and Coastal Carolina University. He was inducted by Science Fiction Hall of Fame that same year, presented by his close friend and collaborator Jack Womack.

=== Visionary influence and prescience ===
"The future is already here – it's just not evenly distributed."

— William Gibson

In Neuromancer, Gibson first used the term "matrix" to refer to the visualized Internet, two years after the nascent modern Internet was formed in the early 1980s from the computer networks of the 1970s. Gibson thereby imagined a worldwide communications network years before the origin of the World Wide Web, although related notions had previously been imagined by others, including science fiction writers. (Note: Both the Internet with its dramatic social effects and the cyberpunk genre itself were also anticipated in John Brunner's 1975 novel The Shockwave Rider.) At the time he wrote "Burning Chrome", Gibson "had a hunch that [the Internet] would change things, in the same way that the ubiquity of the automobile changed things." In 1995, he identified the advent, evolution and growth of the Internet as "one of the most fascinating and unprecedented human achievements of the century", a new kind of civilization that is – in terms of significance – on a par with the birth of cities, and in 2000 predicted it would lead to the death of the nation state.

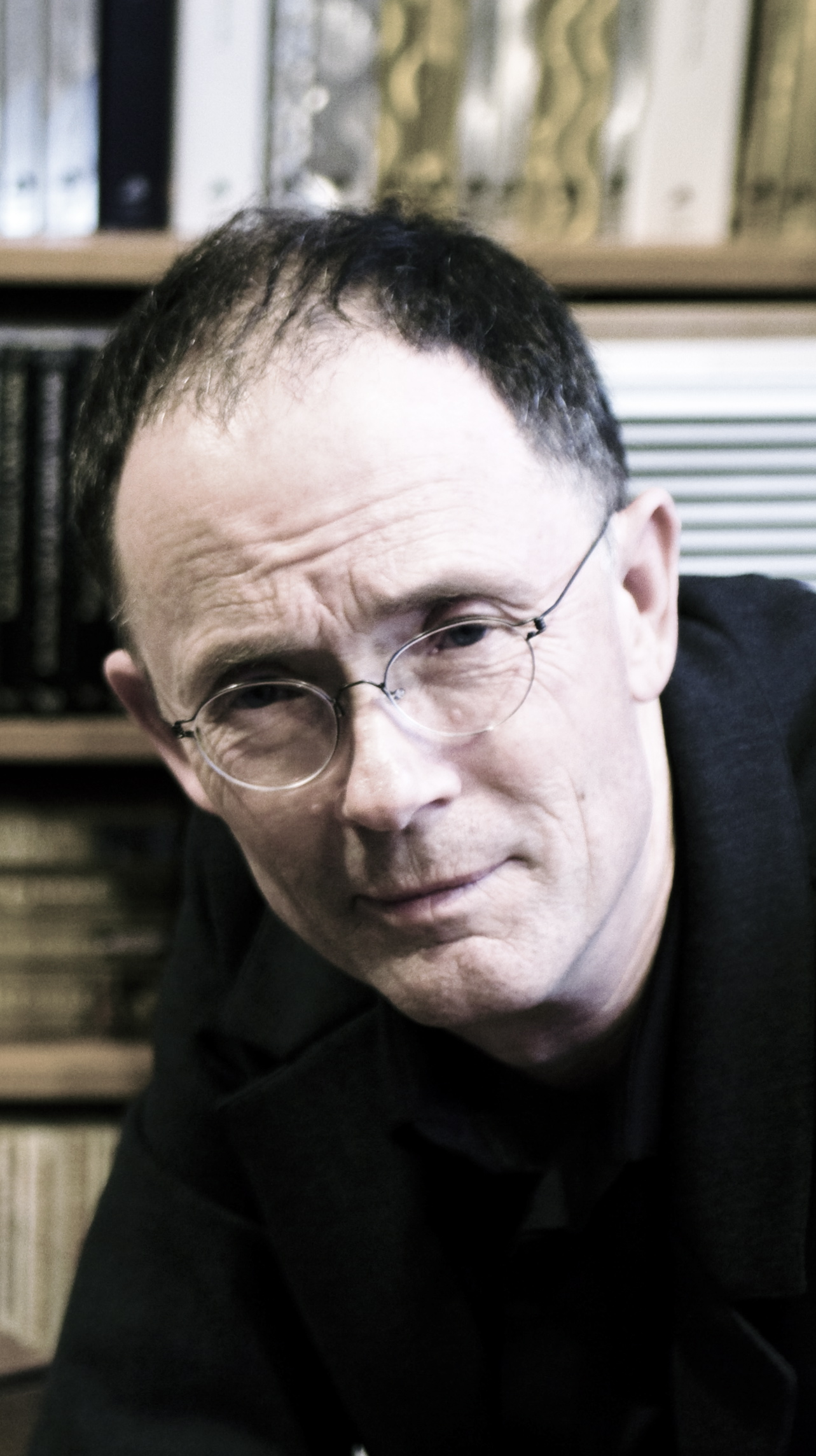
Gibson is renowned for his visionary influence on—and predictive attunement to—technology, design, urban sociology and cyberculture. Image captured in the Scylla bookstore of Paris, France, on March 14, 2008.

Observers contend that Gibson's influence on the development of the Web reached beyond prediction; he is widely credited with creating an iconography for the Information Age, long before the embrace of the Internet by the mainstream. Gibson introduced, in Neuromancer, the notion of the "meatpuppet", and is credited with inventing—conceptually rather than participatorally—the phenomenon of virtual sex. His influence on early pioneers of desktop environment digital art has been acknowledged, and he holds an honorary doctorate from Parsons The New School for Design. Steven Poole suggests that in writing the Sprawl trilogy Gibson laid the "conceptual foundations for the explosive real-world growth of virtual environments in video games and the Web". In his afterword to the 2000 re-issue of Neuromancer, fellow author Jack Womack suggests that Gibson's vision of cyberspace may have inspired the way in which the Internet (and the Web particularly) developed, following the publication of Neuromancer in 1984, asking "what if the act of writing it down, in fact, brought it about?"

Gibson scholar Tatiani G. Rapatzikou commented, in Gothic Motifs in the Fiction of William Gibson, on the origin of the notion of cyberspace:

Gibson's vision, generated by the monopolising appearance of the terminal image and presented in his creation of the cyberspace matrix, came to him when he saw teenagers playing in video arcades. The physical intensity of their postures, and the realistic interpretation of the terminal spaces projected by these games – as if there were a real space behind the screen – made apparent the manipulation of the real by its own representation.

In his Sprawl and Bridge trilogies, Gibson is credited with being one of the few observers to explore the portents of the Information Age for notions of the sociospatial structuring of cities. Not all responses to Gibson's visions have been positive, however; virtual reality pioneer Mark Pesce, though acknowledging their heavy influence on him and that "no other writer had so eloquently and emotionally affected the direction of the hacker community," dismissed them as "adolescent fantasies of violence and disembodiment." In Pattern Recognition, the plot revolves around snippets of film footage posted anonymously to various locations on the Internet. Characters in the novel speculate about the filmmaker's identity, motives, methods and inspirations on several websites, anticipating the 2006 lonelygirl15 Internet phenomenon. However, Gibson later disputed the notion that the creators of lonelygirl15 drew influence from him. Another phenomenon anticipated by Gibson is the rise of reality television, for example in Virtual Light, which depicts a satirical extrapolated version of COPS.

Visionary writer is OK. Prophet is just not true. One of the things that made me like Bruce Sterling immediately when first I met him, back in 1991. [sic] We shook hands and he said "We've got a great job! We got to be charlatans and we're paid for it. We make this shit up and people believe it."

— Gibson in interview with ActuSf, March 2008

Gibson in 2004 attributed Neuromancer's seeming prescience to "my almost perfect ignorance of the technology I was extrapolating from"; when depicting things he knew something about, like impact printers, the book seems dated to later readers. Gibson especially failed to predict the ubiquity of mobile phones. When an interviewer in 1988 asked about the Bulletin Board System jargon in his writing, Gibson answered "I'd never so much as touched a PC when I wrote Neuromancer"; he was familiar, he said, with the science-fiction community, which overlapped with the BBS community. Gibson similarly did not play computer games despite appearing in his stories. He wrote Neuromancer on a 1927 olive-green Hermes portable typewriter, which Gibson described as "the kind of thing Hemingway would have used in the field". (Note: Gibson wrote the following in the "Author's Afterword" of Mona Lisa Overdrive, dated July 16, 1992. Neuromancer was written on a "clockwork typewriter," the very one you may recall glimpsing in Julie Deane's office in Chiba City. This machine, a Hermes 2000 manual portable, dates from somewhere in the 1930s. It's a very tough and elegant piece of work, from the factory of E. PAILLARD & Cie S.A. YVERDON (SUISSE). Cased, it weighs slightly less than the Macintosh SE/30 I now write on, and is finished in a curious green- and-black "crackle" paint-job, perhaps meant to suggest the covers of an accountant's ledger. Its keys are green as well, of celluloid, and the letters and symbols on them are canary yellow. (I once happened to brush the shift-key with the tip of a lit cigarette, dramatically confirming the extreme flammability of this early plastic.) In its day, the Hermes 2000 was one of the best portable writing-machines in the world, and one of the most expensive. This one belonged to my wife's step-grandfather, who had been a journalist of sorts and had used it to compose laudatory essays on the poetry of Robert Burns. I used it first to write undergraduate Eng. lit. papers, then my early attempts at short stories, then Neuromancer, all without so much as ever having touched an actual computer.) By 1988 he used an Apple IIc and AppleWorks to write, with a modem ("I don't really use it for anything"), but as late as 1994 Gibson did not have an email address, a lack he explained at the time to have been motivated by a desire to avoid correspondence that would distract him from writing. His first exposure to a website came while writing Idoru when a web developer built one for Gibson. In 2007 he said, "I have a 2005 PowerBook G4, a gig of memory, wireless router. That's it. I'm anything but an early adopter, generally. In fact, I've never really been very interested in computers themselves. I don't watch them; I watch how people behave around them. That's becoming more difficult to do because everything is 'around them'."

== Selected works ==
Novels

- Sprawl trilogy:
  - Neuromancer (1984)
  - Count Zero (1986)
  - Mona Lisa Overdrive (1988)
- The Difference Engine (1990; with Bruce Sterling)
- Bridge trilogy:
  - Virtual Light (1993)
  - Idoru (1996)
  - All Tomorrow's Parties (1999)
- Blue Ant trilogy (Hubertus Bigend):
  - Pattern Recognition (2003)
  - Spook Country (2007)
  - Zero History (2010)
- Jackpot trilogy
  - The Peripheral (2014)
  - Agency (2020)
  - Jackpot (TBD)

Adapted screenplays

- Archangel (2016–2017) (graphic novel)
- Alien 3 (2018–2019) (graphic novel)
- Alien III (2019) (audio drama)
- Alien^{3}: The Unproduced First-Draft Screenplay by William Gibson (2021) (novel by Pat Cadigan)

Short stories

- Burning Chrome (1986, preface by Bruce Sterling), collects Gibson's early short fiction, listed by original publication date:
  - "Fragments of a Hologram Rose" (1977, UnEarth 3)
  - "Johnny Mnemonic" (1981, Omni)
  - "The Gernsback Continuum" (1981, Universe 11)
  - "Hinterlands" (1981, Omni)
  - "The Belonging Kind", with John Shirley (1981, Shadows 4)
  - "Burning Chrome" (1982, Omni)
  - "Red Star, Winter Orbit", with Bruce Sterling (1983, Omni)
  - "New Rose Hotel" (1984, Omni)
  - "The Winter Market" (Nov. 1985, Vancouver)
  - "Dogfight", with Michael Swanwick (1985, Omni)
- "Skinner's Room" (Nov. 1991, Omni)

Nonfiction

- Agrippa (A Book of the Dead) (1992) – a poem and artist's book
- No Maps for These Territories (2000) – an independent documentary film
- Distrust That Particular Flavor (2012) – essays written over a period of more than twenty years
- "Disneyland with the Death Penalty" – a 1993 Wired article about Singapore

== Media appearances ==
- No Maps for These Territories (2000)
- Making of 'Johnny Mnemonic' (1995)
- Cyberpunk (1990)
- Wild Palms (1993)
- Upload (2023)
