= Bridge trilogy =

Three novels (1993–1999) by William Gibson

The Bridge trilogy is a series of novels by William Gibson, his second after the successful Sprawl trilogy. The trilogy comprises the novels Virtual Light (1993), Idoru (1996) and All Tomorrow's Parties (1999). A short story, "Skinner's Room", was originally composed for Visionary San Francisco, a 1990 museum exhibition exploring the future of San Francisco.

== Setting ==
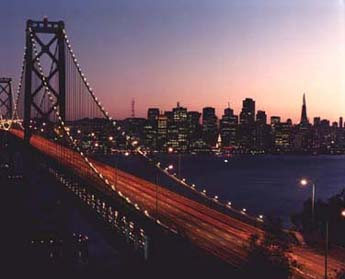
The titular Bridge, pre-quake

The first book of the Bridge trilogy is set in an imaginary 2006, with the subsequent books set a few years later. The books deal with the race to control the beginnings of cyberspace technology and are set on the United States' West coast in a post-earthquake California (divided into the separate states of NoCal and SoCal), as well as a post-earthquake Tokyo, Japan, that had been rebuilt using nanotechnology.

The trilogy derives its name from the San Francisco–Oakland Bay Bridge, because in the trilogy it was abandoned in an earthquake and has become a massive shantytown and site of improvised shelter. The bridge is a pivotal location in Virtual Light and All Tomorrow's Parties.

Characters in each novel interact in a cyberspace construct of Kowloon Walled City, which is initially described as an inverted kill file. The walled city shares a number of features with the bridge itself, including an emphasis on self-governance and efficiency in user-construction.

== Characters ==
The novels of the Bridge trilogy loosely share a common cast of characters. Former police officer Berry Rydell and bicycle courier Chevette Washington occupy central roles in the first and third novels. Researcher Colin Laney, who has a mysterious ability to identify patterns in vast tracts of information, appears in Idoru and All Tomorrow's Parties. Other recurring characters include Rei Toei, an AI pop star, and Shinya Yamazaki, an existential sociologist.

== Critical reception and influence ==
Canadian Poet Douglas Barbour said of the trilogy that it "has all the stylistic verve of his earlier work, but it asks some tougher questions, explores character more deeply, and savagely interrogates our star-obsessed society." Virtual Light, the first novel in the series, was nominated for both the Hugo and Locus Awards in 1994.
