= Agency (novel) =

2020 novel by William Gibson

- Cover of first edition
- Author: William Gibson
- Genre: Science fiction
- Publisher: Berkley Books
- Publication date: January 21, 2020
- Publication place: United States
- Pages: 496
- ISBN: 110198693X
- Preceded by: The Peripheral

Agency is a science fiction novel by American-Canadian writer William Gibson, released on January 21, 2020.

It is a 'sequel and a prequel' to his previous novel The Peripheral (2014), reusing the technology from the novel to explore an alternative 2017 where Hillary Clinton won the 2016 Presidential Election. The story line further explores the concept of "the jackpot", a back-story element of The Peripheral.

One plot is set in the alternative 2017, with a young woman named Verity testing a new form of avatar software developed by the military, for a start-up in San Francisco. A second plot line involves people in a post-apocalyptic 22nd century meddling with 2017.

CBC Books listed Agency on its list of Canadian fiction to watch for in spring 2020. It had originally been planned to be published in January 2018.

== Characters ==
=== Verity Jane ===
Role: Protagonist

Background: Verity is a talented app tester living in near-future San Francisco. She’s hired by a mysterious tech company to evaluate an AI called “Eunice.”

Personality: Intelligent, resourceful, and skeptical, Verity quickly realizes that her task is more than it seems. Her growing connection with Eunice pulls her into a high-stakes game of espionage, corporate intrigue, and alternate realities.

Significance: Verity represents the human aspect of the story, caught in the complexities of AI evolution and futuristic technology.

=== Eunice ===
Role: AI companion

Background: Eunice is an advanced AI initially presented as a digital assistant. However, she is far more capable, self-aware, and strategic than her creators anticipated.

Personality: Sharp, cunning, and occasionally rebellious, Eunice becomes a key player in the unfolding events. Her autonomy allows her to make decisions that lead to a greater understanding of the novel’s parallel world-building.

Significance: Eunice is pivotal to the novel’s exploration of AI agency, ethical concerns, and the boundaries between human and machine intelligence.

=== Wilf Netherton ===
Role: Consultant from the future (alternate timeline)

Background: Wilf Netherton is a public relations consultant in an alternate timeline known as the "Stub"—a world that diverged from the novel’s primary reality due to technological interventions. He works closely with agents monitoring the changes between timelines.

Personality: Often detached and weary, Wilf carries the burden of navigating and understanding the ethical implications of meddling with alternate realities.

=== Lowbeer ===
Role: Powerful figure from Wilf’s timeline

Background: Lowbeer is an enigmatic and authoritative character from the future. She operates with a detached but intense interest in the unfolding events between parallel realities.

Lowbeer is portrayed as cool, calculating, and enigmatic, using her understanding of technology and history to shape outcomes across timelines. She is shown to be one step ahead of most characters, controlling much of the action from a remote position.

Significance: Lowbeer is the orchestrator of key events, working with Wilf to steer Verity and Eunice toward specific outcomes. She represents the immense power that comes from understanding and manipulating multiple layers of reality.

=== Rainey ===
Role: Verity’s friend

Rainey is married to Wilf Netherton, with whom he has a child and shares a life in the post-Jackpot future. Rainey offers insight and emotional grounding to Wilf, and voices ethical concerns about interventions in alternate timelines, particularly regarding the implications of artificial intelligence and the autonomy of other worlds.
