= Virtual Light =

1993 novel by William Gibson

- Cover of the first UK edition
- Author: William Gibson
- Cover artist: Don Brautigam
- Language: English
- Series: Bridge trilogy
- Genre: Science fiction
- Publisher: Bantam Books
- Publication date: 1993
- Publication place: United States
- Media type: Print (hardcover and paperback)
- Pages: 325
- ISBN: 978-0-553-07499-4
- OCLC: 27727228
- Followed by: Idoru

Virtual Light is a 1993 novel by the American-Canadian writer William Gibson. First published by Bantam Books, it is the first volume in Gibson's Bridge trilogy. Set in a near-future California, the novel takes place after an earthquake has damaged the San Francisco-Oakland Bay Bridge and turned it into an improvised settlement known as the Bridge.

The novel follows Chevette Washington, a bicycle messenger who steals a pair of virtual light glasses without realizing that they contain valuable concealed data, and Berry Rydell, a former police officer who becomes drawn into the attempt to recover them. Their intersecting pursuit brings together private security interests, violent intermediaries, and the Bridge community, linking the device to plans for a redeveloped San Francisco.

Critics and scholars have treated Virtual Light as a transitional work in Gibson's fiction, emphasizing its shift from the cyberspace-oriented mode of his earlier novels toward a more material and urban setting. Discussion of the novel has often focused on surveillance, redevelopment, and the tension between privatized urban order and the improvised social space of the Bridge. The novel was a finalist for the 1994 Hugo Award for Best Novel and placed fourth in the 1994 Locus poll for best science fiction novel.

== Background and publication ==
In later interviews, William Gibson described Virtual Light as part of a new phase in his fiction: a near-future novel set close enough to the present to make contemporary life look estranged rather than remote. He later grouped it with Idoru and All Tomorrow's Parties as the Bridge trilogy, calling the sequence his take on the 1990s, and said that this phase of his work often felt less like conventional futurism than like a form of alternate history. Gibson also said that he had grown dissatisfied with what he called the "capital-F Future", and that Virtual Light was written to feel like an intensified, distilled version of the contemporary world.

That shift also marked a change in emphasis from the abstract spaces associated with Gibson's earlier cyberspace fiction to a more physical and immediate urban setting. Gibson described the novel as comic in intention, though not necessarily unbleak, and said that its world was essentially the present with the volume turned up. In discussing the period in which he wrote the novel, he said that Los Angeles had already "slipped" into the twenty-first century and pointed to Mike Davis's City of Quartz as an important point of reference; later critics have also linked the novel's urban setting and spatial politics to that influence. Gibson also said that Chevette drew in part on San Francisco bicycle-messenger culture, and that his research included the messenger zine Mercury Rising as well as time spent observing local messenger hangouts.

A direct precursor to the novel was Gibson's short story "Skinner's Room", published in Omni in 1991. In the acknowledgments to Virtual Light, Gibson wrote that a work commissioned for the 1990 exhibition Visionary San Francisco became "Skinner's Room", and that his collaboration with the architects Ming Fung and Craig Hodgetts provided several elements later used in the novel, including Skywalker Park, the Trap, and the Sunflower towers. Those materials connected the book's future San Francisco to a design and exhibition context as well as to Gibson's broader interest in improvised urban space.

Virtual Light was first published in New York by Bantam Books in 1993. A Canadian edition from Seal Books appeared the same year, and Penguin issued a British edition in 1994. A Spectra mass-market paperback followed in 1994, and the novel was later reissued in ebook and audiobook formats.

== Plot ==
Virtual Light is set in a near-future California after a major earthquake has damaged the San Francisco-Oakland Bay Bridge and turned it into a dense improvised settlement known as the Bridge. Chevette Washington, a bicycle messenger who lives there, becomes involved in a larger conflict after wandering into a party at a hotel and impulsively stealing a pair of dark glasses from a man named Hans Rutger Blix. She does not know that they are virtual light glasses, a device that projects images directly into the optic nerve, or that they contain concealed data of great value. After Blix is murdered, Chevette finds herself pursued by multiple people seeking to recover the glasses.

Another central character is Berry Rydell, a former police officer who now works for the private security firm IntenSecure. After losing that job when hackers lure him into responding to a false emergency, he agrees to freelance in San Francisco with Lucius Warbaby and Warbaby's associate Freddie. Although the assignment is presented as part of the investigation into Blix's murder, Rydell gradually realizes that the real objective is to recover the missing glasses. He is told that Chevette is a suspect, but he comes to see that the people directing him are involved in a broader scheme connected to the device.

Chevette turns for help to her friend Sammy Sal DuPree and to Skinner, an older resident associated with the early Bridge community. A Japanese researcher, Shinya Yamazaki, is also living on the Bridge while studying Skinner and the settlement. Before Chevette can dispose of the glasses, Sammy shows her how they work, and she sees that they contain plans for a radically redeveloped San Francisco. The information points to a secret project involving advanced nanotechnology and major financial interests. Loveless, an enforcer connected to the scheme, closes in, and during the confrontation, Sammy helps Chevette escape but is shot off the Bridge and presumed dead. Chevette goes deeper into the Bridge community, realizing that the theft has drawn her into something larger than the murder itself.

Rydell is sent onto the Bridge to find her. He catches up with Chevette during a storm, but the different groups pursuing the glasses converge at the same time, including private security personnel, police, Loveless, and Bridge residents. Chevette tells Rydell that Loveless killed Sammy, and Rydell increasingly concludes that the official account of Blix's death is false. When violence breaks out, he turns against Warbaby and escapes with Chevette and the glasses. While hiding together, they compare what they know, and Rydell pieces together the connections among IntenSecure, Blix, Loveless, and the redevelopment plan. Their alliance shifts from pursuit to cooperation as they try to survive and preserve the evidence contained in the glasses.

Loveless later captures them and explains more openly what is at stake. He says that he killed Blix after the courier lost possession of the glasses, and that the data concerns plans to remake San Francisco through high-tech redevelopment that would generate major profits for insiders. Rydell and Chevette escape again and eventually join Sublett, Rydell's former partner, and the hacker group known as the Republic of Desire. Rydell concludes that they can only prevail by using information systems against their pursuers. The glasses and their contents are routed toward the Los Angeles lawyer Karen Mendelsohn, while Rydell arranges for the Republic of Desire to hack the Los Angeles Police Department surveillance network known as the "Death Star", making their enemies appear to be armed terrorists holding hostages.

The climax takes place in Los Angeles. Warbaby, Freddie, Loveless, and the corrupt detectives converge on the handoff, only to be trapped by the false surveillance picture Rydell has created. SWAT teams move in, the pursuers are neutralized, and Loveless is stopped before he can kill Chevette and the others. The reality television program Cops in Trouble, which has followed Rydell since his time as a police officer, turns the incident into a media spectacle, and its producers and lawyers provide legal and financial assistance. In the closing sections, Yamazaki becomes personally attached to the Bridge rather than remaining only an observer, and Sammy Sal is revealed to have survived his fall.

== Themes and analysis ==
=== The contested city ===
A central line of criticism reads Virtual Light as a novel about urban space under conditions of privatization, weakened public authority, and pervasive surveillance. Rather than imagining a distant future, the novel presents a California that remains recognizably continuous with the present, but in a form intensified by corporate power, private security, and the enclosure of formerly public space. In this reading, Gibson's speculative setting matters less as prophecy than as a way of making visible the social sorting, spatial segregation, and everyday insecurity already latent in contemporary urban life.

Contemporary reviewers also connected the novel's politics of space to its satire of media, religion, and redevelopment culture. Later scholarship has extended that emphasis by situating the Bridge novels within Gibson's larger interest in spatial formations shaped by consumption, franchising, and tourism, while treating Virtual Light as an especially clear case of conflict between improvised habitation and more regulated urban order.

=== The Bridge ===
The Bay Bridge settlement is the novel's most persistent critical focal point. Scholars have described it as an interstitial, paraspatial, or heterotopian community: an accreted social space built from salvage, temporary alliances, and improvised forms of inhabitation in the gaps left by larger political and economic systems. This reading treats the Bridge not simply as a backdrop but as a social form in its own right, one that gathers together heterogeneous lives, local knowledges, and fragile modes of cooperation that would not easily survive within the more formalized spaces around it.

Critics have therefore often read the Bridge as both refuge and pressure point. It offers a visible alternative to the surrounding corporate city, but it is also precarious, vulnerable to commercialization, and threatened by redevelopment schemes that would absorb or erase its informal economies. This tension between vitality and exposure helps explain why the Bridge has been treated as one of Gibson's defining images of constrained freedom: a place where new social relations emerge, but only within a larger order that can still appropriate, theme-park, or displace them.

=== Materiality ===
Another major critical argument treats Virtual Light as a turn in Gibson's fiction away from the more abstract environments associated with the Sprawl novels and toward a more embodied, material, and architectural world. In place of disembodied immersion, the novel emphasizes streets, buildings, vehicles, prosthetic devices, and bodies moving through uneven urban infrastructures. Gibson himself later described the book as more physical and visceral than his earlier work, and critics have connected that shift to the novel's attention to place, pattern, and the built environment.

This change in mode also shapes the novel's tonal texture. Reviewers noted a stronger comic and parodic strain in Virtual Light than in Gibson's earlier fiction, even while the novel remains preoccupied with exclusion, insecurity, and urban decay. The result is a version of near-future science fiction grounded less in estrangement than in recognition: a world that feels close to the contemporary city, but rendered sharper through Gibson's attention to surfaces, gadgets, architecture, and precarious social roles.

=== Projected futures ===
The novel's concern with urban change is concentrated in the titular glasses, which several critics read as more than a plot device. In this line of interpretation, they project a redesigned San Francisco organized by corporate planning and speculative redevelopment, making the future visible as a contested spatial program rather than an inevitable destination. The projected city they reveal threatens the Bridge's informal economies and mixed social world, turning redevelopment into the clearest expression of the novel's struggle over who gets to occupy, control, and imagine urban space.

Read this way, Virtual Light is less concerned with prediction in any simple technological sense than with competing claims on the future. Critics have argued that the novel extrapolates from existing social tendencies, including privatization, exclusion, and the colonization of usable space by capital, while also insisting that such futures remain unstable, negotiable, and open to appropriation from below. Even the novel's projected urban order is therefore not fully closed. It appears instead as an aggressive plan pressing against alternative communities and residual spaces that have not yet been completely absorbed.

== Reception ==
=== Contemporary reception ===
Virtual Light was received positively by most contemporary reviewers, though several suggested that it was less formally surprising than Gibson's earlier fiction. Reviewers frequently praised the novel's environments, visual imagination, and command of urban atmosphere, with particular attention to its rendering of the Bay Bridge settlement and the surrounding California sprawl. Some critics also noted the energy of Gibson's prose and the force of his speculative setting even when they treated the novel's pursuit plot as comparatively conventional.

More detailed reviews often treated the book's strengths as inseparable from its sense of place. Mike Davis, writing in Artforum, emphasized the novel's urban imagination and its treatment of social division and spatial conflict. Julian Loose, reviewing the novel in the London Review of Books, highlighted both its satirical edge and its feel for the textures of a near-future California shaped by media, religion, and redevelopment. Richard A. Lupoff, writing for Locus, described the book as a strong return to form, while other reviewers praised its vivid setting and Gibson's ability to make speculative extrapolation feel immediate and concrete.

=== Retrospective appraisal ===
Later commentary has generally placed Virtual Light within Gibson's Bridge trilogy and treated it as an important transitional novel in his career. Retrospective discussion has tended to emphasize its treatment of urban space, commodification, technology, and informal community, especially through the centrality of the Bay Bridge setting. In this view, the novel is often seen less as a return to cyberpunk in its earlier form than as a reorientation of Gibson's fiction toward infrastructure, embodiment, and contested city space.

=== Awards and distinctions ===
Virtual Light was a finalist for the 1994 Hugo Award for Best Novel. The award was won by Kim Stanley Robinson's Green Mars; the other finalists were Greg Bear's Moving Mars, Nancy Kress's Beggars in Spain, and David Brin's Glory Season. In the 1994 Locus poll for best science fiction novel, Virtual Light placed fourth behind Green Mars, Moving Mars, and Poul Anderson's Harvest of Stars, and ahead of Arthur C. Clarke's The Hammer of God.
