= William Gibson: A Literary Companion =

2011 book

First edition

William Gibson: A Literary Companion is a 2011 book by Tom Henthorne, published by McFarland & Company, focused on analyzing the works of American science-fiction writer William Gibson.
