= The Peripheral (novel) =

2014 science fiction novel by William Gibson

- First-edition dust jacket cover
- Author: William Gibson
- Language: English
- Genre: Science fiction
- Published: October 28, 2014
- Publisher: G. P. Putnam's Sons
- Publication place: Canada
- Pages: 486
- ISBN: 0670921556
- Followed by: Agency

The Peripheral is a 2014 science fiction mystery-thriller novel by William Gibson set in near- and post-apocalyptic versions of the future. The story focuses on a young rural-town American woman who lives in the near future, and on a London publicist who lives 70 years thereafter. Gibson's 2020 book Agency is set in the same world. A television series adaptation of The Peripheral, produced by Amazon, began streaming in October 2022.

== Summary ==
The novel focuses on Flynne and her brother, Burton. When Burton is hired for a security job which takes place in what he thinks is cyberspace and Flynne temporarily takes his place, she witnesses a possible murder.

According to GQ's Zach Baron:

The Peripheral is an emphatic return to the science fiction he [William Gibson] ceased to write after the turn of this century, set in not one but two futures. The first, not far off from our own present day, takes place in a Winter's Bone–ish world where the only industries still surviving are lightly evolved versions of Walmart and the meth trade. The second future is set further along in time, after a series of not-quite-cataclysmic events that have killed most of the world's population, leaving behind a monarchic class of gangsters, performance artists, and publicists in an otherwise deserted London.

== Plot ==
The novel begins sometime in the near-future in a small town in rural America. Flynne Fisher works at a local 3D printing shop and lives with her mother and her brother Burton, who sustained brain trauma from cybernetic implants he received while serving in the U.S. Marine Corps' elite Haptic Recon unit. When Burton heads to another town to counter-protest the protests of a religious extremist group known as Luke 4:5, he asks her to take over his job working security in a video game/virtual world for a supposedly Colombian company called Milagros Coldiron. Flynne takes the job and notices the game world looks suspiciously like London, but far more empty and more futuristic. Piloting a security quadcopter, she fends off paparazzi drones from an unknown woman's high-rise apartment. On the second night of doing so she witnesses a man and a woman out on a balcony, where the woman is apparently killed and gruesomely devoured by a swarm of nanobots; Flynne is uncertain whether this is real or part of a virtual game.

The novel alternates between Flynne's experiences and those of Wilf Netherton, a publicist who lives in the early 22nd century, seventy years later than Flynne's time, and several decades after an apocalyptic period known as the Jackpot took place. As the book begins, Wilf is working with Daedra West, an American artist/celebrity/diplomat, on establishing relations with a group of deformed native humans known as "Patchers," on an enormous cultivated garbage patch in the Pacific Ocean. However, Daedra's reckless behavior triggers her personal security system, killing all the Patchers and their boss, Hamed al-Habib. Wilf is fired (he assumes; he doesn't check his mail) and goes to his friend Lev Zubov's house. Lev, the son of a powerful and wealthy Russian family that moved to Britain several generations ago, is a "continua enthusiast." He has introduced Wilf to "stubs" which are alternate pasts whose futures begin to deviate from the ones that lead to his and Wilf's present at the moment contact is made from their present - a contact only possible in a data sense and only made possible by a mysterious quantum computer running in China. Milagros Coldiron is Zubov's front organization for accessing the stub in which Flynne and Burton live. Inhabitants of Flynne's time are able to access the early 22nd century of Zubov and Netherton via headsets built using a 3D printer and technological know-how passed back to them from the 22nd century. These headsets allow the wearer's consciousness to inhabit and control a 'peripheral' a.k.a. an artificial physical human body in the 22nd century. Using this technology, Wilf had hired Burton Fisher from his stub to act as drone security for Daedra's sister, Aelita, as a novelty gift to her.

When Aelita goes missing, Wilf realizes that the drones controlled by Flynne were the only witness of the event while all other recording devices were disabled.

Returning from his trip, Burton tells Flynne that Milagros Coldiron wants to speak with her. Via a video call, she tells Wilf and the others about what she saw on the tower, but Wilf is reluctant to tell her that the murder was not part of a game. He does tell Flynne that an assassination contract has been put out on Burton, on their timeline, using the darknet. Burton responds by getting his military colleagues to set up a perimeter around their house. Shortly after, his friend Conner, a triple amputee who uses a motorized, road-capable wheelchair, kills four armed men in a car heading up the country road to their house, using a mentally-controlled gun rig. Milagros Coldiron begins using their advanced technology and foreknowledge to build financial and political power in the past.

Wilf, Lev, and their allies in the further future are visited by Inspector Ainsley Lowbeer, investigating Aelita's disappearance. When they tell her what Flynne told them, she insists that Flynne be brought to the future via a peripheral (a cyborg avatar that users can connect to from another location) via the quantum server so that Flynne can identify the man who was present when Aelita died, to help solve the case. Lev and his assistants Ash and Ossian send back 3D printing instructions for a peripheral-controlling headset, which Flynne's computer-savvy friends Macon and Edward use to create a connectivity headband for her called "the crown". She connects to a peripheral that has been brought to Lev's house, where Wilf explains that this is really the future, albeit not one possible for her now that her timeline has been altered.

Lowbeer notices that Daedra is holding a new party at her sister's apartment, and she gets Wilf to get himself and Flynne's peripheral invited, with Wilf pretending that the peripheral will be controlled by a woman who studies neoprimitive art and is a huge fan of Daedra's work. Deciding they might need extra muscle to confront Daedra, Wilf's group recruits Conner to manufacture another crown and control another peripheral, a bodyguard for Wilf at the party; Conner is ecstatic at being able to walk again while piloting a peripheral. Meanwhile, back in the 21st century, a second group of assassins is killed by Burton's military colleagues. Milagros Coldiron attempts to "buy" the state governor, who, like most officials of the time, is corrupt, to avoid a police investigation. Burton's group use Milagros Coldiron's money and connections to build a secure base and acquire military equipment. Flynne is kidnapped by one of Burton's colleagues under blackmail by a local drug baron named Corbell Pickett. Pickett explains that the people who killed Aelita are operating a corporate collective called Matryoshka with the goal of killing Flynne, and Pickett is negotiating a higher reward before executing her. She is rescued by Burton and Conner, who kill Pickett’s security guards and destroy his compound. Wilf's crew in the future make her, Burton, and their friends executives of Coldiron USA, which is now battling economically and politically against Matryoshka around the globe, and declares their base the corporate headquarters.

Wilf reveals that the Jackpot begins in the middle of the 21st century as a combination of climate change and other causes, followed by a series of droughts, famines, pandemics, political chaos, and anarchy. 80% of the global human population dies off. But as this is going on, scientists have created nanotech called Assemblers that begins to rebuild society, as well as finding other scientific and engineering breakthroughs. As a result, everything is very efficient and advanced in Wilf's future, but it has mostly empty cities and most natural animal species are extinct.

Wilf, Flynne and Conner (the latter two in their peripherals) go to Daedra's party, which has become a celebration of Aelita's life. Flynne spots the man who killed Aelita, but he and Daedra kidnap them, revealing themselves to be behind the plot to kill Flynne. Conner's peripheral is destroyed while trying to kill the kidnappers. The man who was present when Aelita was killed is revealed to be Hamed al-Habib, who had been "killed" by Daedra as a peripheral that day on the garbage patch, and had undergone surgery to revert himself to a more normal human form long ago. Daedra and Hamed have conspired with a city official named Sir Henry, who holds the position of remembrancer, to exterminate the patchers and sell their resources to profit themselves. Aelita was killed for reasons not entirely clear, most likely because Hamed and Daedra feared she was going to sell them out.

Conner (operating a robotic weapon designed in another stub under Lowbeer's influence) and Burton (operating a peripheral-like exoskeleton) break into the room where Flynne and Wilf are being held. Flynne and Burton fire special weapons that direct Assembler nanobots, and both Hamed and Sir Henry are eaten down to the bone by the machines; Daedra is temporarily detained but is released after interrogation. In Flynne's world Matryoshka becomes completely inoperative and Milagros Coldiron gains uncontested power.

Years later, Flynne winds up married to the police officer she had long been interested in; her brother and their friends find love as well. Conner receives a set of bionic limbs constructed from plans sent from the future. Wilf finds love with his former coworker from Canada, with whom he moves in. He and Flynne still connect back and forth between timelines to see each other; Flynne meets weekly with Lowbeer (via peripheral) to discuss the changes to Flynne's world that are being made through the funding of Milagros Coldiron in an attempt to avert the Jackpot.

== Creation and publication ==
Gibson was working on the book as early as August 2012. The Peripheral was Gibson's 13th book. On April 19, 2013, Gibson appeared at the New York Public Library and read from the first chapter: "The Gone Haptics". The book was published in November 2014.

Gibson's book Agency is set in the same world as The Peripheral, also involving alternative but connected futures.

== Critical reception ==
The Peripheral was positively received by The Guardian. According to GQ's Zach Baron, "Like many Gibson books, The Peripheral is basically a noirish murder mystery wearing a cyberpunk leather jacket and, after an uncharacteristically dense first one hundred pages, a super enjoyable read—though perhaps less so when you consider just how accurate Gibson can be when he's thinking about what might come next. Because according to The Peripheral, what is coming next is, to borrow Gibson's phrase again, well...fucked." The Sydney Morning Herald noted an "ultimate lack of narrative cohesion," but said that the book was still dense with "imaginative technological inventions and societal extrapolations, not least on capitalism, government surveillance and retro Third World colonialism."

The Irish Times wrote that it was "a formidable novel, and one that boasts just about the only plausible depiction of time travel in recent fiction. But it does suffer from slow pacing and a flat final-act climax." The Financial Times gave it a mixed review, calling the "twin narratives [...] complex and tangled," but overly drawn out over the book's nearly 500 pages. The Verge said the book was a "smart, nuanced twist on time travel" and praised how detail was integrated more into the characters' lives than his other recent series. NPR gave the book a positive review. The Toronto Star said it could be difficult to keep up with the book, but it was "fast-paced and chock full of fascinating speculations into not only what the future will look like, but how it will work."

== Television adaptation ==
A streaming series adaptation was commissioned in 2018 by Amazon to be developed by Westworld creators Lisa Joy and Jonathan Nolan. The series was put into development in April 2018 with a "script-to-series commitment", receiving a firm go-ahead in the middle of November 2019. Beyond Joy and Nolan, executive producers include Athena Wickham, Steven Hoban and Vincenzo Natali. It has one-hour episodes and was developed by Kilter Films for Amazon Studios. Warner Bros. Television was also involved as a producer, with Scott B. Smith as writer. Smith created the series and served as the showrunner as well as executive producer. Natali directed the show's pilot. In February 2023, Amazon Studios announced that the series had been renewed for a second season. In August 2023, Amazon Studios subsequently cancelled the series despite the prior renewal, due to the 2023 SAG-AFTRA strike.
