= All Tomorrow's Parties (novel) =

1999 novel by William Gibson

- Cover of the British edition
- Author: William Gibson
- Language: English
- Series: Bridge trilogy
- Publisher: Viking
- Publication date: 1999
- Publication place: United Kingdom
- Pages: 278
- ISBN: 0-670-87557-0
- OCLC: 1255745550
- Preceded by: Idoru

All Tomorrow's Parties is a 1999 novel by William Gibson and the third and final novel in the Bridge Trilogy. Set in a near-future San Francisco Bay Area and Tokyo, the novel brings together several continuing characters from the earlier Bridge books, including Berry Rydell, Chevette Washington, and Colin Laney. Its plot centers on Laney's attempt to prevent the public-relations magnate Cody Harwood from exploiting an approaching "nodal point" of historical change focused on the settlement built on the Bay Bridge.

Critics have generally treated the novel as part of Gibson's turn away from the distant futures of his early cyberpunk fiction and toward a more immediate near-future mode concerned with media, infrastructure, urban space, and corporate power. Commentary on the novel has often emphasized the Bridge as an interstitial and precarious social space, the book's interest in prediction and historical contingency, and its treatment of embodiment and virtual presence through the figure of Rei Toei.

Reception was mixed. Reviewers often praised Gibson's prose and his rendering of a near-future urban environment, while also expressing reservations about characterization, clarity, and the ending. The novel later placed 15th in the 2000 Locus Awards and was nominated for the 2001 Seiun Award for best foreign novel.

== Background and publication ==
All Tomorrow's Parties is a 1999 novel by William Gibson and the concluding volume of the Bridge Trilogy. Critics and scholars have treated the trilogy as a distinct phase in Gibson's work, one that shifts from the more remote futures of his early cyberpunk fiction toward a near-future setting closer to the social and material conditions of the 1990s.

In later comments on his fiction, Gibson described the Bridge novels as his version of the 1990s and characterized them as near-future or alternate-history works rather than conventional far-future science fiction. This shift in emphasis has often been treated as part of a broader turn in his writing away from cyberspace as a dominant imaginative setting and toward the built environment, everyday technology, and the texture of contemporary urban life.

Gibson also said that the trilogy was not planned in rigid outline from the beginning. In a 1999 interview, he said he tended to arrive at trilogies indirectly, with one novel generating material for the next, and he described Colin Laney's pattern-recognition ability as a figure for aspects of his own compositional method. In another interview from the period, Gibson described the bridge community at the center of the trilogy as an autonomous zone that was nevertheless exposed to commercialization and absorption into the larger urban economy.

The novel was published in the United States in 1999 by G. P. Putnam's Sons. A British edition was issued the same year by Viking in London. Later reissues grouped the novel explicitly with Virtual Light and Idoru as part of the Bridge sequence, and Penguin Random House currently lists it as the third book in the trilogy.

== Plot ==
Colin Laney is living in hiding in Tokyo's Shinjuku district, weakened by earlier 5-SB drug trials that have left him physically ruined but able to perceive "nodal points", moments when events are about to shift decisively. Watching the movements of public-relations magnate Cody Harwood, Laney concludes that Harwood has also recognized an approaching nodal point and intends to exploit it. Believing that the next such convergence will occur in San Francisco around the Bay Bridge settlement, Laney asks Shinya Yamazaki to find Berry Rydell and send him there in his place because he is too ill to travel.

Rydell is working security at a Lucky Dragon convenience store in Los Angeles when Yamazaki finds him and relays Laney's request. He also gives Rydell a projector unit containing Rei Toei, the virtual idol introduced in Idoru. Laney offers little explanation beyond insisting that Rydell take the unit to San Francisco and keep moving. Trusting Laney's judgment, Rydell leaves Los Angeles and heads north.

Chevette Washington is also returning to San Francisco. Having left her abusive boyfriend Carson, she goes back to the Bridge, where she had once lived, hoping to disappear among its residents. Her friend Tessa, an Australian film student making a documentary about marginal urban communities, drives her there and continues filming the Bridge and the people around it. Carson follows Chevette, determined to recover control over her.

Harwood sends the assassin Konrad west as part of the same operation. Konrad closes in on Rydell but, when he has the chance, does not kill him. Instead, he turns on the other men pursuing Rydell and begins moving alongside him rather than against him. On the Bridge, Fontaine is caring for a mute boy named Silencio, who is obsessed with watches and seems uncannily able to find them. Silencio becomes fixated on one particular watch, and Fontaine realizes that the boy's obsession is connected to larger events.

After Rydell reaches San Francisco, Harwood's men attack him directly. Konrad intervenes and keeps him alive. Rydell and Konrad then encounter Chevette, who takes them to Fontaine's watch shop on the Bridge. Fontaine and Silencio shelter them there, bringing the main strands of the pursuit together in one place. Realizing that the people and objects he wants have converged on the Bridge, Harwood escalates the conflict. When his operatives fail to resolve the situation, he orders the Bridge set on fire.

Inside Fontaine's shop, the Rei Toei projector ceases to be mere cargo. Konrad links the device to Silencio's eyephones, allowing Rei Toei to guide the boy as he follows the watch through cyberspace. Because the watch is tied to Harwood, Silencio is able to trace it back to Harwood's hidden position. From Tokyo, Laney joins the effort remotely from his shelter in Shinjuku, while allies in the Walled City help interpret what Silencio is finding. As the fire spreads across the Bridge, Laney and his allies use Silencio's tracking and Rei Toei's guidance to close in on Harwood.

The fire drives residents out across the Bridge and into the surrounding streets. In the confusion, Rydell becomes separated from the others and struggles through smoke and wreckage, at one point encountering the country singer Buell Creedmore as both men try to escape the flames. Carson's attempt to reassert control over Chevette collapses amid the chaos, and she finally escapes him. Konrad continues acting against Harwood rather than serving him, carrying his break with his employer through the climax.

The nodal point resolves through Rei Toei rather than through Harwood's design. No longer confined to the projector unit, she uses the Lucky Dragon network and the technological systems around the Bridge to cross into physical form. Harwood fails to master the event he had tried to control. Instead, Laney's warning proves correct: the decisive change occurs in San Francisco, Harwood's plans are broken, and Rei Toei emerges into the world in a new way. Rydell and Chevette survive, Carson no longer controls Chevette's life, and the Bridge endures the fire though badly damaged. Laney remains in Tokyo, dying, having correctly foreseen where the shift would occur.

== Themes and analysis ==
All Tomorrow's Parties is commonly read as the culmination of Gibson's Bridge Trilogy, a sequence that shifts his speculative focus away from the distant futures of his early cyberpunk fiction and toward a recognizably near-future world shaped by media saturation, improvised urban space, and corporate power. In that context, critics have treated the novel less as a showcase for technological novelty than as a study of how networks, architecture, and capital reorganize everyday life. Miller places the Bridge books in a transitional phase of Gibson's career, while later criticism has often emphasized that the move toward the near future lets the trilogy examine contemporary social arrangements more directly than the earlier cyberspace novels.

A major line of interpretation centers on the Bridge itself. Leaver describes the Bridge novels as an "interstitial" trilogy concerned with spaces that exist between established corporate and governmental structures, and he treats the Bay Bridge settlement in All Tomorrow's Parties as one of the clearest expressions of that logic. Murphy similarly reads the Bridge as a key interstitial site, contrasting such improvised environments with larger systems of control and linking them to questions of presence, virtuality, and social patterning. Gibson, in interview, described the bridge community as an autonomous zone while also stressing its vulnerability to commodification, a tension that criticism has echoed in reading the novel's improvised social world against the pressures of redevelopment and absorption into the urban economy.

Related criticism has emphasized precarity and vulnerability in the novel's social world. Yazell reads the Bridge trilogy as a critique of neoliberal dystopia, arguing that the Bridge is not simply a picturesque ruin or outlaw refuge but a space of interdependence shaped by unstable security and shared exposure. On that reading, All Tomorrow's Parties presents community not as settled refuge but as a contingent arrangement formed under pressure. Rapatzikou likewise stresses the instability of the novel's built environments, arguing that Gibson uses layered architectural and spatial motifs to create an "unhomely" world in which bodies, technologies, and material structures are repeatedly forced into uneasy relation.

Another recurring critical focus is the novel's treatment of prediction and historical change. Briggs argues that the Bridge books approach prediction meta-fictionally rather than as simple prophecy, and that in All Tomorrow's Parties Laney's ability to perceive nodal points makes the future appear interpretive and data-shaped rather than fixed in advance. In this account, the novel resists the idea that history can be mastered through superior information alone: Harwood tries to seize the coming transformation, but the narrative instead presents the future as something only partially legible and never fully controllable. Murphy connects this emphasis on pattern to the trilogy's broader concern with simulation, presence, and the unstable boundary between the virtual and the material.

Critics have also treated the novel as an important statement on embodiment and posthuman possibility. Leaver argues that the Bridge trilogy repeatedly entertains posthuman futures while still presenting material embodiment as desirable and, in the end, necessary. That argument has been especially relevant to discussion of Rei Toei, whose movement beyond purely mediated existence has been read not as a rejection of the body but as a reconfiguration of bodily presence within a technologically saturated world. Rapatzikou similarly emphasizes corporeality and material layering in the novel, suggesting that All Tomorrow's Parties ties questions of identity to architecture, infrastructure, and physical habitation rather than leaving them in a purely virtual realm.

== Reception ==
Contemporary reviews of All Tomorrow's Parties were mixed, though several critics praised Gibson's prose and his rendering of a near-future urban world. Writing in January Magazine, Sienna Powers described the novel as dark, cryptic, and ultimately satisfying, and praised Gibson's compressed style and the social texture of the Bridge setting. Andrew O'Hehir, in Salon, similarly admired the intensity of Gibson's writing and the vividness of the novel's near-future environment. Paul Wohleber, reviewing the book for Science Fiction Weekly, judged it more economical than Virtual Light and Idoru and praised its stylish prose and engaging characters.

At the same time, reviewers often qualified that praise with reservations about characterization, clarity, and the ending. O'Hehir argued that the novel's conclusion was less vivid and precise than the buildup that preceded it. Wohleber likewise praised the book's movement and style but found Harwood's objectives indistinct and described the ending as both funny and anticlimactic. William Linne, in the San Francisco Chronicle, admired parts of Gibson's descriptive writing and his treatment of crowd scenes, but faulted the novel's characterization and suspense even as he read it as a meditation on alienation at the end of the century.

Some reviews were more sharply critical. In Entertainment Weekly, Ty Burr argued that the novel largely recombined characters, settings, and themes from the earlier Bridge books without matching their vividness or emotional force, and he judged it weaker than both Virtual Light and Idoru. A more favorable retrospective review by Steven Poole in The Guardian described All Tomorrow's Parties as the culmination of Gibson's second trilogy and as evidence of his development from a science-fiction stylist into what Poole called a "wry sociologist of the near future".

The novel later placed 15th in the 2000 Locus Awards and was nominated for the 2001 Seiun Award in the foreign-novel category.
