= Idoru =

1996 novel by William Gibson

- Cover of the United Kingdom edition
- Author: William Gibson
- Language: English
- Series: Bridge trilogy
- Genre: Science fiction
- Publisher: G. P. Putnam's Sons
- Publication date: 1996
- Pages: 304
- ISBN: 0-399-14130-8
- OCLC: 39158749
- Preceded by: Virtual Light
- Followed by: All Tomorrow's Parties

Idoru is a 1996 science fiction novel by William Gibson, published in the United States by G. P. Putnam's Sons. It is the second novel in Gibson's Bridge trilogy, following Virtual Light and preceding All Tomorrow's Parties.

Set mainly in a near-future Tokyo rebuilt after a major earthquake, Idoru follows two converging plotlines. Colin Laney, a former data analyst with an unusual ability to detect significant patterns in information, is hired to investigate Rez, one half of the rock duo Lo/Rez, after Rez announces his intention to marry Rei Toei, a virtual Japanese celebrity. Chia Pet McKenzie, a teenage fan from Seattle, travels to Tokyo to learn whether the rumor is true and becomes caught in a scheme involving illegal nanotechnology.

Critical discussion of the novel has focused on its treatment of virtual celebrity, Japanese media culture, embodiment, and the relation between physical and digital spaces. Rei Toei has been read as both a media construct and a figure through which the novel examines desire, artificial personality, and the boundary between human and nonhuman identity. The novel's virtual reconstruction of Kowloon Walled City, Hak Nam, has also been discussed as one of the Bridge Trilogy's central interstitial spaces.

Idoru received generally favorable contemporary reviews, with critics praising Gibson's style, Tokyo setting, and treatment of media-saturated near-future culture, while some found the pacing or ending less successful. The novel placed sixth in the 1997 Locus Poll Award for Best Science Fiction Novel.

== Background and publication ==
G. P. Putnam's Sons published Idoru in the United States in 1996. The novel is the second book in William Gibson's Bridge trilogy, following Virtual Light and preceding All Tomorrow's Parties. The trilogy is usually treated as a turn in Gibson's fiction from the more distant future of the Sprawl trilogy toward a nearer-present world shaped by cities, media systems, celebrity, and networked information. In Idoru, that shift is centered on Tokyo, pop music, virtual celebrity, and the Pacific Rim.

Gibson later said that he had not planned Virtual Light as the beginning of a trilogy, and described the sequence as having developed organically. In the same interview, he said that he was less interested in inventing technologies than in tracing how technologies already beginning to appear might change social behavior in unforeseen ways. He connected Colin Laney's ability to detect nodal points in data with his own habit of looking for signs of the future in contemporary life, and described his attention to street-level culture as part of that observational process.

A Berkley mass-market paperback edition followed in 1997. A French translation by Pierre Guglielmina was published by J'ai lu in 1999. The cover art for the Putnam edition is credited to Honi Werner. Before publication, Publishers Weekly reported that the novel would receive a 100,000-copy first printing, advertising and promotion, and an author tour; the Dictionary of Literary Biography later reported that Gibson received a $1.4 million advance for the book.

== Plot ==
Idoru is set in a near-future Tokyo rebuilt after a major earthquake, where advanced nanotechnology has transformed construction and new buildings appear to assemble themselves. The city is saturated by media, celebrity culture, and networked information. The novel follows two alternating plotlines: Colin Laney, a former data analyst with an unusual ability to identify significant nodal points in large streams of information, and Chia Pet McKenzie, a fourteen-year-old member of the Seattle chapter of the Lo/Rez fan club. Both are drawn to Tokyo by the same rumor: Rez, one half of the rock duo Lo/Rez, intends to marry Rei Toei, an idoru, or virtual celebrity, who exists as a personality construct rather than as a human being.

Laney comes to Tokyo after leaving Slitscan, a celebrity-scandal operation that uses surveillance, data mining, and media manipulation to damage reputations. His ability has made him valuable, but it has also left him exposed to people who want to exploit him. He is approached for work connected to Rez and meets Keith Alan Blackwell, Rez's scarred and intimidating security chief. Blackwell suspects that Rez may be under some form of manipulation and wants Laney to discover what lies behind the proposed marriage to Rei Toei. Laney begins searching Rez's data trail, but finds it strangely empty, as if Rez's life has been shielded from ordinary scrutiny.

Chia's route to Tokyo begins with fandom rather than employment. Her fan-club chapter sends her to find out whether the marriage rumor is true and whether Rez is in trouble. On the flight, she meets Maryalice, an unstable American woman who tricks her into carrying a package through customs. Chia does not understand what she has been given, but after Maryalice quarrels with her boyfriend Eddie, Chia flees with the item still in her possession. In Tokyo, she contacts local fan-club members, including Mitsuko and Mitsuko's brother Masahiko, whose technical skill and access to virtual spaces become increasingly important. Chia and Masahiko discover that the package is not drugs but an illegal nanotechnology assembler module, valuable enough to attract dangerous attention from Eddie and his Russian criminal contacts.

As Chia and Masahiko try to evade pursuit, they move between physical Tokyo and networked environments, especially Hak Nam, a virtual reconstruction of Kowloon Walled City. Chia also communicates with Zona Rosa, a fierce online friend in Mexico who can intervene digitally despite being physically distant. Meanwhile, Laney's investigation brings him closer to Rez and Rei Toei. Rei appears to be more than a passive entertainment product: she responds, acts, and seems connected to Rez's desire for a new kind of union. Laney is also pressured by Kathy Torrance from Slitscan, who threatens to destroy him with fabricated evidence unless he serves her interests.

The plotlines converge at the Hotel Di, a love hotel where Chia and Masahiko take refuge so they can access the network privately. Eddie and a Russian representative arrive to recover the assembler module, and Maryalice also reappears. The confrontation threatens to become violent, but Zona Rosa intervenes from the network by spreading a false report that Rez has died at the hotel. The rumor draws Lo/Rez fans to the building in a public vigil, and the growing crowd, combined with the risk of police attention, makes open violence more difficult. The standoff is forced toward negotiation rather than a simple shootout.

The immediate danger ends through bargaining. Rez's people, Blackwell, Laney, Chia, Masahiko, Eddie, Maryalice, and the Russian representative are drawn into an uneasy resolution over the assembler module and the interests attached to it. Blackwell also agrees to deal with Kathy Torrance's attempt to blackmail Laney, freeing him from Slitscan's hold. Laney completes his work and becomes involved with Arleigh, one of Rez's technical staff. Chia is sent home to Seattle first class, shaken by what she has seen and more aware of the distance between fandom's image of Rez and the complicated reality surrounding him. The novel ends with Rez and Rei Toei's intended union still proceeding, while the consequences of that union remain unresolved.

== Themes and analysis ==
Idoru has often been discussed as a Bridge Trilogy novel that moves Gibson's cyberpunk concerns into a nearer-present context. Rather than treating cyberspace as a separate or exotic realm, the novel embeds data, celebrity, and networked power in recognizable media industries, cities, and consumer culture. The book carries forward Gibson's interest in artificial intelligence, urban fragmentation, and information systems, but does so in a world closer to the 1990s present than the more stylized future of the Sprawl trilogy. This transitional position has led commentators to place Idoru between cyberpunk and postcyberpunk, with the Bridge Trilogy frequently understood as a step toward the present-set fiction Gibson wrote after All Tomorrow's Parties.

The novel's treatment of space is central to this shift. Tokyo is not only the setting of the plot but also a dense urban environment shaped by media, commerce, surveillance, and information flow. Hak Nam, the novel's virtual reconstruction of Kowloon Walled City, gives the book a second kind of city: a digital space built from memory, illicit networks, and overlapping histories. Critics have read this Walled City as one of the trilogy's key interstitial spaces, neither wholly physical nor wholly virtual, and neither fully controlled by corporations nor by the state. In this respect, Idoru links architecture and information systems, using urban space to examine how communities and identities form at the edges of official structures.

Rei Toei, the idoru of the title, brings those questions of space and information into the sphere of celebrity. Her proposed marriage to Rez turns a virtual media figure into the center of a public scandal, making the novel's treatment of artificial personality inseparable from pop culture and publicity. The book uses Rei less as a conventional artificial intelligence than as a constructed celebrity presence, assembled through image, voice, desire, data, and audience attention. Critics have connected Rei to Japanese virtual-idol culture and to the transpacific circulation of media forms, reading her as both a product of Japanese pop culture and a figure through which Gibson explores Western fascination with Japan. In these readings, celebrity in Idoru is not simply fame attached to a person, but a system that can manufacture, sustain, and eroticize a personality that has no ordinary human body.

At the same time, Idoru complicates the idea that digital existence means escape from the body. Rei's virtuality depends on material systems, including nanotechnology, architecture, hardware, and the human desires projected onto her. Scholarship on the novel has therefore treated embodiment as one of its central problems: the book repeatedly crosses boundaries between flesh and data, animate and inanimate matter, person and performance, and body and environment. Rei's identity is not presented as a simple liberation from embodiment, but as a form of personhood that depends on the material and social systems around her.

Other characters extend the novel's interest in bodies that are mediated, marked, or differently read by their environments. Laney's ability to perceive patterns in data makes him valuable within information systems but also isolates him from ordinary social life. Zona Rosa, Blackwell, and other figures have been read through disability and embodiment, especially in relation to how physical difference, scars, attention, and social context shape what counts as ability or impairment. These readings place Idoru within a broader account of the Bridge Trilogy as fiction about posthuman possibility, but not a simple fantasy of leaving the body behind. In this critical account, the novel's virtual and artificial forms remain bound to cities, technologies, markets, and bodies, so that its posthumanism is material rather than purely disembodied.

== Reception ==
Contemporary reviewers generally treated Idoru as a strong entry in Gibson's 1990s fiction, while differing over its pacing and resolution. Kirkus Reviews described the novel as more relaxed and approachable than some of Gibson's earlier work, with stronger plotting and a persuasive near-future setting. Steven Poole of The Guardian also responded favorably, calling the book politically sharper than Virtual Light and praising its pace, wit, visual detail, and prose. In Wired, Andrew Leonard emphasized the novel's compressed imagery, Tokyo setting, and treatment of pop culture, media corruption, and near-present technology.

The novel's setting and social texture drew particular attention. Reviewers often focused on Gibson's version of Tokyo, his treatment of celebrity culture, and the way the book made digital life feel less like a remote future than an extension of contemporary media systems. John Clute, writing in The Washington Post Book World, praised the novel's evocation of Tokyo and described much of the book as among Gibson's strongest work on the emerging world. Publishers Weekly likewise called the future of the novel richly imagined and comprehensible, while noting that it was slower than Virtual Light and did not represent a major new departure.

Some reviewers were more reserved about the novel's structure. Peter D. Olszewski of SF Site found Idoru less richly textured than Gibson's best earlier fiction and argued that its first half was slowed by Colin Laney's backstory, though he judged the second half more successful. New Statesman described the novel as an exhilarating ride but suggested that its momentum and atmosphere were stronger than its resolution. Clute similarly praised the novel at length while finding its ending less satisfying.

Shorter notices also placed the novel within cyberpunk and digital-culture contexts, including coverage in Wired UK and the French magazine Backstab. The novel placed sixth in the 1997 Locus Poll Award for Best Science Fiction Novel.
