= Node =

In general, a node is a localized swelling (a "knot") or a point of intersection (a vertex).

Node may refer to:

== In mathematics ==
- Vertex (graph theory), a vertex in a mathematical graph
- Vertex (geometry), a point where two or more curves, lines, or edges meet.
- Node (autonomous system), behaviour for an ordinary differential equation near a critical point
- Singular point of an algebraic variety, a type of singular point of a curve

== In science and engineering ==
=== Spherical geometry ===
- node, the points where a great circle crosses a plane of reference, or the equator of a sphere

=== Astronomy ===
- Orbital node, the points where an orbit crosses a plane of reference
  - Lunar node, where the orbits of the Sun and Moon intersect
  - Longitude of the ascending node, how orbital nodes are parameterized

=== Biology ===
- Lymph node, an immune system organ used to store white blood cells
- Node of Ranvier, periodic gaps in the insulating myelin sheaths of myelinated axons
- Sinoatrial node and atrioventricular node, specialized tissues in the heart responsible for initiating and coordinating the heartbeat
- Primitive knot or primitive node, the organizer tissue for gastrulation in vertebrates
- The place on a plant stem where a leaf is attached
- In cladistics, a shared ancestor (also see Clade)

=== Computing and electronics ===
- Node (networking), a point of connection in a communication network
- An entity in a mesh network
- Node (circuits), a region in an electrical circuit where there is no change in potential
- Node (computer science), a basic unit used to build data structures
- Goal node (computer science), a node in a graph that meets defined criteria for success or termination
- Node (UML), the representation of a computational device in the Unified Modeling Language
- Node.js, a JavaScript-based, cross-platform runtime environment
- NodeB, hardware that is connected to the mobile phone network
- NODE (wireless sensor), a wireless handheld sensor for smart devices
- Node, a shorthand used to designate a semiconductor fabrication process

=== Linguistics ===
- Node (linguistics), a branch point in the Tree model, or Node Theory, of language evolution

=== Physics ===
- Node (physics), a point along a standing wave where the wave has minimal amplitude

=== Space-station modules ===
- Unity (ISS module) or Node 1, one of the first modules of the International Space Station
- Harmony (ISS module) or Node 2, module of the International Space Station
- Tranquility (ISS module) or Node 3, a module of the International Space Station with the Cupola
- Node 4, a proposed module of the International Space Station
- Prichal (ISS module), a module of the International Space Station launched in 2021

== In music ==
- Node (band), Italian death metal band
- Node (singer), Danish singer and hip hop artist of Kurdish origin
- Node (album), a 2015 album by Australian metalcore band Northlane

== Other uses ==
- Node, Kentucky
- Node tribe, a community of pastoral nomads in India and Pakistan
- Node, a transport hub in a transportation system
- Giordana Racing Team, a British cycling team, formerly named Node4-Giordana
- Node Magazine, a literary project based on the novel Spook Country by William Gibson
- New Oxford Dictionary of English, a single-volume English language dictionary, see Oxford Dictionary of English
- Node, a cyborg with a donated human face used as a guide, in "Silence in the Library" (Doctor Who)
- Node, the pommel-like part of a chalice where the stem meets the cup
- A nodal organizational structure, such as in terms of business management, see Cellular organizational structure

== See also ==
- Nodal (disambiguation)
- Nodule (disambiguation)
