= Noad =

Noad or NOAD can refer to:

- Noad Lahat (born 1948), Israeli featherweight mixed martial artist
- Noad (surname)
- New Oxford American Dictionary, American English dictionary
- TSV NOAD, Dutch football club

== See also ==
- Node (disambiguation)
