= Hubertus Bigend =

Fictional character in William Gibson's novels

Hubertus Bigend is a fictional character appearing in the third trilogy of novels of science fiction and literary author William Gibson. Bigend is the antihero of Gibson's Pattern Recognition (2003), Spook Country (2007) and Zero History (2010). In an interview Gibson says "I've always had a sense of Bigend as someone who presents himself as though he knows what's going on, but who in fact doesn't. It's just my sense of the subtext of the character: he's bullshitting himself, at the same time as he's bullshitting all of us."

== Character history ==
=== Pattern Recognition ===
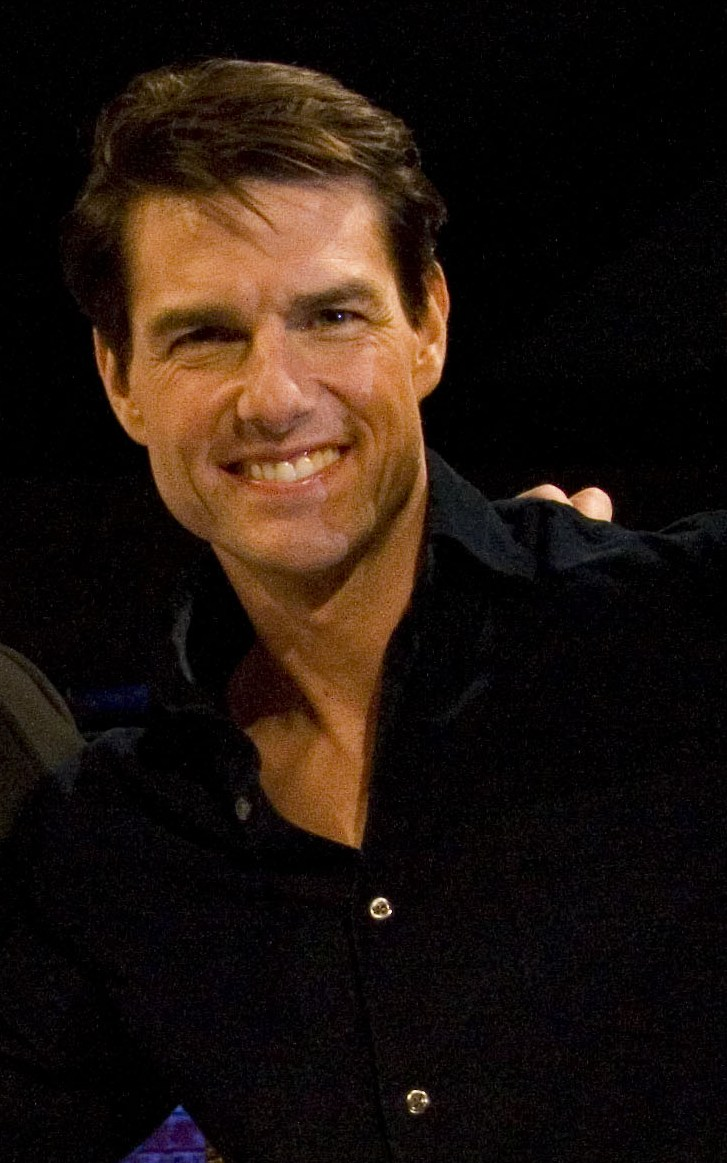
Bigend's appearance is compared by the protagonist of Gibson's Pattern Recognition to that of actor Tom Cruise "on a diet of virgins' blood and truffled chocolates". Cruise pictured here on MTV Live in December 2008.

Bigend is introduced in Pattern Recognition as the charismatic founder of the fictional "viral advertising"/coolhunting agency Blue Ant, from the perspective of protagonist Cayce Pollard:

She's here on Blue Ant's ticket. Relatively tiny in terms of permanent staff, globally distributed, more post-geographic than multinational, the agency has from the beginning billed itself as a high-speed, low-drag life-form in an advertising ecology of lumbering herbivores. Or perhaps as some non-carbon based life-form, entirely sprung from the smooth and ironic brow of its founder, Hubertus Bigend, a nominal Belgian who looks like Tom Cruise on a diet of virgins' blood and truffled chocolates.

— Pattern Recognition, p.6

Bigend hires Pollard to track down the source of haunting film fragments known as "the footage" that have been appearing anonymously online, though she loathes him and suspects that his motivation is mercenary; the exploitation of the art as a marketable commodity. Bigend and Blue Ant benefit from Pollard's work both by the discovery of the origin of the footage and by a relationship he establishes with a Russian oligarch. In Spook Country, it is revealed that Bigend successfully harnesses the footage to sell shoes.

=== Spook Country ===
Gibson did not anticipate Bigend appearing in Spook Country, but realised when writing about a non-existent magazine named Node—characterized as a European version of Wired—that it was "way Bigendian". Thus, Bigend appears as the backer of the ethereal magazine. Again seeking out the origin of a new artwork (in this instance locative), Bigend hires protagonist Hollis Henry for the ostensible purpose of writing a magazine article on it. Of Bigend, Henry is told that "he doesn't want you to have heard of him". To sate her curiosity, Henry accesses his fictional Wikipedia entry:

She tried the link for his Wikipedia entry.

Hubertus Hendrik Bigend, born June 7, 1967, in Antwerp, is the founder of the innovative advertising agency Blue Ant. He is the only child of Belgian industrialist Benoît Bigend and Belgian sculptor Phaedra Seynhaev. Much has been made, by Bigend's admirers and detractors alike, of his mother's early years with the Situationalist International (Charles Saatchi was famously but falsely reported to have described him as "a jumped up Situationist spiv") but Bigend himself has declared that the success of Blue Ant has entirely to do with his own gifts, one of which, he claims, is the ability to find precisely the right person for a given project. He is very much a hands-on micromanager, in spite of the firms's remarkable growth in the past five years.

— Spook Country, p.74-75

The book also reveals that the correct pronunciation of "Bigend" is "bay-jhan", though this is seldom used even by Bigend himself.

=== Zero History ===
Bigend again featured prominently in Zero History, Gibson's 2010 follow-up to Spook Country, again as the employer of Hollis Henry. In it, he wears a suit in the color International Klein Blue which he likes because it is a color that cannot be represented on most computer monitors.

== Critical impression ==
Bigend is described by Times Union reviewer Michael Janairo as a "hyper-connected, ever curious, multigazillionaire", and by biopunk writer Paul Di Filippo as amoral and egocentric. Other appellations include "imperious" (SFGate), "enigmatic" (St. Louis Post-Dispatch), "pontifical Belgian ad mogul" (The Village Voice), "filthy-rich man-behind-the-curtain" (Seattle Times), "untrustworthy corporate spiv" (The Guardian), "accentless Machiavellian fixer with unnervingly white teeth" (New Statesman), and "information-sucking android-like advertising guru and godgame magus" (John Clute, Sci Fi Weekly).

Academic Alex Wetmore identified a parallel between the relationships of Bigend and Cayce Pollard and that of Case, the protagonist of Gibson's Neuromancer (1984) and the entity which recruits him, characterizing both Bigend and Case's recruiter as "mysterious and potentially untrustworthy". Wetmore observes that Bigend "espouses a curiously communal and transnational approach to marketing" compared to that of the money-hungry dot-commers whose frontier individualism the corporate universe has rejected in favour of the Bigendian approach. The character of Bigend thus represents for Wetmore "a shift in the nature of capitalism and, consequently, a change in the way postindustrial technologies deployed by capitalism interact with the self."

== Footnotes ==
Spook Country's Node was the inspiration for the real-life literary project Node Magazine.

== Related pages ==
- List of fictional anti-heroes
- Endianness
