= Internode =

Internode may refer to:

- Internode (botany), a portion of a plant stem between nodes
- Internode (ISP), an Internet service provider in Australia
- Internodal segment, a portion of a nerve fibre

== See also ==
- Node (disambiguation)
