= Personal visibility =

Personal visibility may refer to:

- Appropriation (art)
- Coolhunting, identifying and using trends
- Feasibility study, the estimation of a companies future performance
- Iconize, to promote oneself as a representative of a culture
- Personal branding, influence over a companies promotion of a personal brand and how to stay on-Brand
- Promotion (marketing), make popular related brands to a topic of interest to enhance reputation as a consultant or business professional
- Résumé, attractiveness to employers for certain skill sets that match what companies are looking for
