= International Klein Blue =

Deep blue pigment first mixed by the French artist Yves Klein

Color coordinates
- Hex triplet: #002FA7
- sRGB^{B} (r, g, b): (0, 47, 167)
- HSV (h, s, v): (223°, 100%, 65%)
- CIELCh_{uv} (L, C, h): (26, 83, 263°)
- Source: ColorHexa
- B: Normalized to [0–255] (byte)

International Klein Blue (IKB) is a deep blue hue first mixed by the French artist Yves Klein. IKB's visual impact comes from its heavy reliance on ultramarine, as well as Klein's often thick and textured application of paint to canvas.

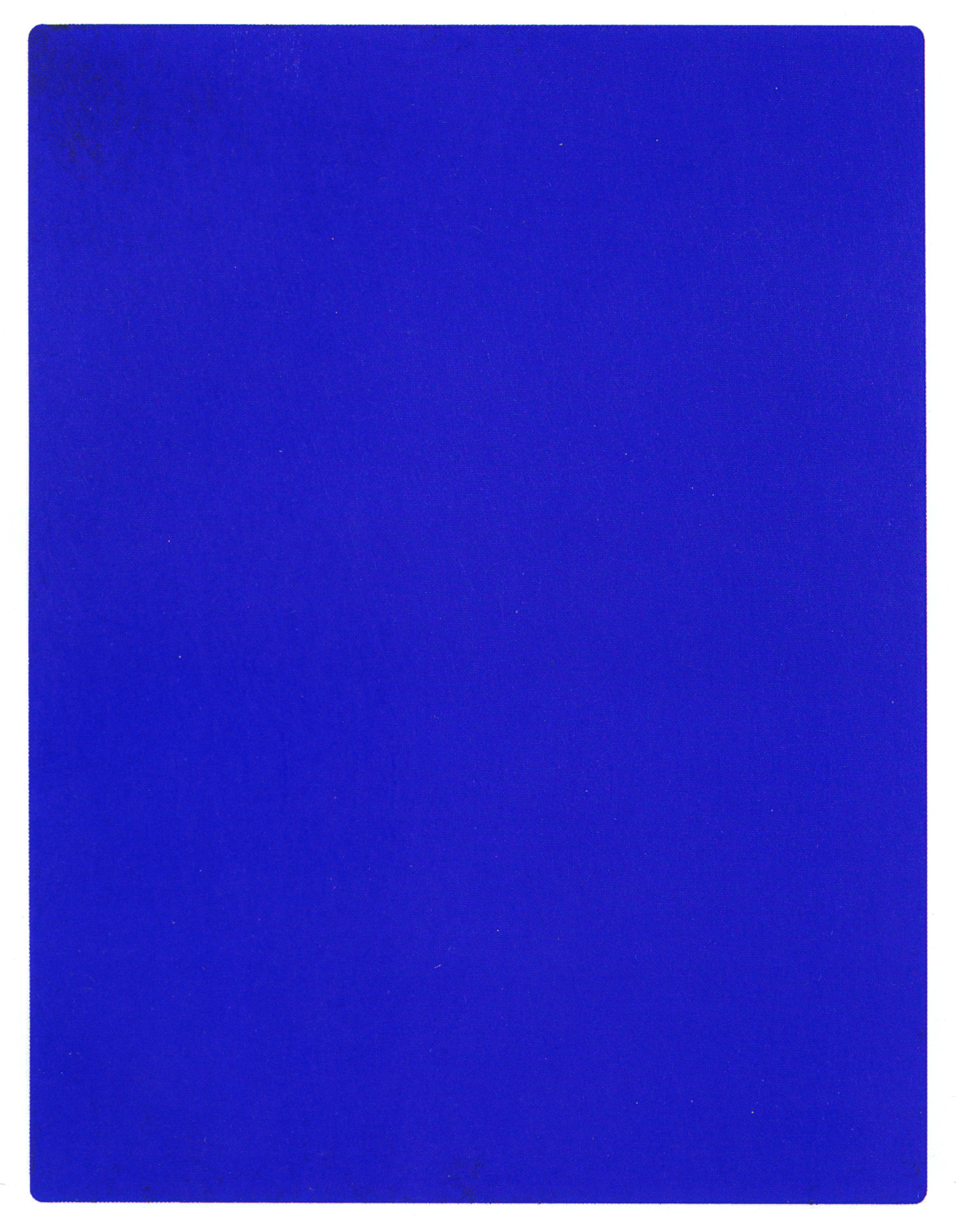
IKB 191 (1962), one of a number of works Klein painted with International Klein Blue

== History ==
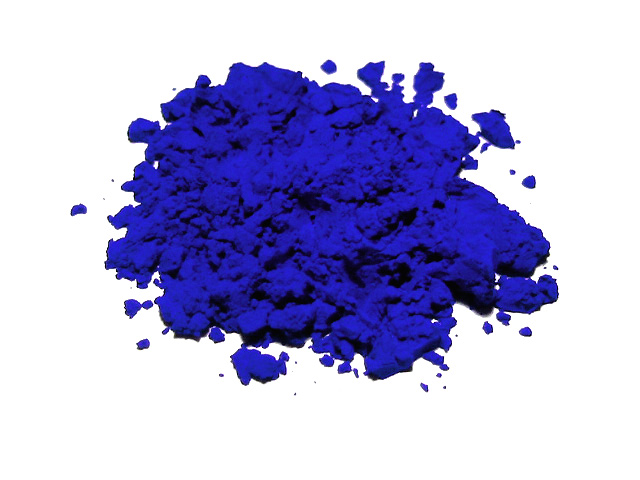
Synthetic ultramarine, similar to that used in IKB pigment

International Klein Blue (IKB) was developed by Yves Klein in collaboration with Edouard Adam, a Parisian art paint supplier whose shop is still in business on the Boulevard Edgar-Quinet in Montparnasse. IKB uses a matte, synthetic resin binder, which suspends the color and allows the pigment to maintain as much of its original qualities and intensity of color as possible. The synthetic resin used in the binder is a polyvinyl acetate developed and marketed at the time under the name Rhodopas M or M60A by the French pharmaceutical company Rhône-Poulenc. Adam still sells the binder under the name "Médium Adam 25".

In May 1960, Klein deposited a Soleau envelope, registering the paint formula under the name International Klein Blue (IKB) at the Institut national de la propriété industrielle (INPI), but he never patented IKB. Only valid under French law, a Soleau envelope registers the date of invention, according to the depositor, prior to any legal patent application. The copy held by the INPI was destroyed in 1965. Klein's own copy, which the INPI returned to him duly stamped, still exists.

In March 1960, Klein patented a method by which he was able to distance himself from the physical creation of his paintings by remotely directing models covered in the color.

== Use in Yves Klein's art ==
Although Klein had worked with blue extensively in his earlier career, it was not until 1958 that he used it as the central component of a piece (the color effectively becoming the art). Klein embarked on a series of monochromatic works using IKB as the central theme. These included performance art where Klein painted models' naked bodies and had them walk, roll and sprawl upon blank canvases as well as more conventional single-color canvases. Six sculptures by Klein in the Musiktheater im Revier, Gelsenkirchen, Germany, are executed in IKB. One artwork he made is the Anthropometrie.

Klein said of the color:

Blue has no dimensions, it is beyond dimensions, whereas other colors are not. They are prepsychological expanses, red, for example, presupposing a site radiating heat. All colors arouse specific associative ideas, psychologically material or tangible, while blue suggests at most the sea and the sky, and they, after all, are in actual visual nature what is most abstract.

The artist Donald Judd corroborated this by claiming "Yves Klein's blue paintings are the only ones that are unspatial".

In the original performance of Klein's Monotone-Silence Symphony in 1960, three naked models on stage were painted with International Klein Blue body paint during the performance, and left imprints of their bodies on canvas.

== In culture ==
=== Academia ===
- Academy Award-winning actor Eddie Redmayne, although colourblind, wrote his dissertation on IKB (which he can distinguish from others) when he studied History of Art at Trinity College, Cambridge in 2003.

=== Art ===
- Among the different versions of the IKB around the world, there is one on display at the Centre Pompidou in Paris, France.

=== Film ===
- In 1962, the documentary Mondo Cane featured Yves Klein painting with his models and using the eponymous color.
- In 1993, the experimental film Blue, the final piece created by Derek Jarman, used the shade IKB 79 as the sole shot for the backdrop of the entire film. Used to represent the loss of his sight, and developing a blue tinge as a result of suffering from AIDS-related complications and side effects from medical treatment.
- In Jean-Luc Godard's 1965 film Pierrot le Fou, Ferdinand paints himself International Klein Blue during the final scene.

=== Literature ===
- In the 2010 William Gibson novel Zero History, fictional advertising mogul Hubertus Bigend wears a suit of IKB, because "it unsettles people."
- The UK-based publisher Fitzcarraldo Editions has a distinctive, minimalist, typographic treatment for all its book covers. All fiction books are Yves Klein Blue with white type, while non-fiction are the reverse, white with blue type.

=== Music ===
- Yves Klein Blue, an Australian rock band, take their name from the color and the artist who created it.
- In 1982 Danish rock band Kliché released an instrumental named "International Klein Blue".
- International Klein Blue is the color used by Blue Man Group.
- Roger Eno recorded a composition called Reflections on I.K.B. on his 1985 album Voices (EG Records, Virgin).
- Welsh rock band Manic Street Preachers released a single on 8 December 2017 called "International Blue", which is written about Yves Klein and IKB.
- "Klein International Blue" is the opening track on the Sandy Dirt EP, a collaboration between Al Larsen of Some Velvet Sidewalk, and Scottish group The Pastels, released in 1995 by the Domino Recording Company.
- Dutch artist Joost Klein designed a suit in International Klein Blue to wear in the music video and performance for "Europapa", the song with which he represented the Netherlands in the Eurovision Song Contest 2024.

=== Television ===
- Episode 14 of season 2 (8 May 2016) of Mike Tyson Mysteries is titled "Yves Klein Blues". The episode sees the former boxing champion seeking to use the color in his summer tracksuit.

== See also ==
- YInMn Blue
- Lists of colors
