= Spook Country =

2007 Book by William Gibson

- United Kingdom first edition cover
- Author: William Gibson
- Language: English
- Genre: Political thriller Dark satire
- Publisher: G. P. Putnam's Sons; Viking Press
- Publication date: August 2, 2007
- Publication place: United States
- Media type: Print (hardback, paperback, audiobook); E-book
- Pages: 371 pp (hardcover)
- ISBN: 0-670-91494-0
- OCLC: 122283346
- Preceded by: Pattern Recognition
- Followed by: Zero History

Spook Country is a 2007 novel by speculative fiction author William Gibson. A political thriller set in contemporary North America, it followed on from the author's previous novel, Pattern Recognition (2003), and was succeeded in 2010 by Zero History, which featured much of the same core cast of characters. The plot comprises the intersecting tales of three protagonists: Hollis Henry, a musician-turned-journalist researching a story on locative art; Tito, a young Cuban-Chinese operative whose family is on occasion in the employ of a renegade ex-CIA agent; and Milgrim, a drug-addled translator held captive by Brown, a strangely authoritarian and secretive man. Themes explored include the ubiquity of locative technology, the eversion of cyberspace and the political climate of the United States in the aftermath of the September 11, 2001 attacks.

Spook Country quickly reached mainstream North American bestseller lists and was nominated for British Science Fiction Association and Locus Awards.

== Plot summary ==
The first strand of the novel follows Hollis Henry, a former member of the early 1990s cult band The Curfew and a freelance journalist. She is hired by advertising mogul Hubertus Bigend to write a story for his nascent magazine Node (described as a European Wired) about the use of locative technology in the art world. Helped by curator Odile Richard she investigates Los Angeles artist Alberto Corrales, who recreates virtually the deaths of celebrities such as River Phoenix. Corrales leads her to Bobby Chombo, an expert in geospatial technologies who handles Corrales' technical requirements. Chombo's background is troubleshooting navigation systems for the United States military. He is reclusive and paranoid, refusing to sleep in the same GPS grid square on consecutive nights, and only consents to talk to Hollis due to his admiration for The Curfew.

Tito is part of a Chinese Cuban family of freelance "illegal facilitators", as Brown describes them – forgers, smugglers, and associated support personnel based in New York City – and is assigned by his uncles to hand over a series of iPods to a mysterious old man. Tito is adept in a form of systema that encompasses tradecraft, a variant of free running, and the Santería religion. It is alluded that the old man may have connections to American intelligence circles and Tito hopes he can explain the mysterious death of his father. When the old man calls in a favour, his family dispatches Tito on a dangerous new assignment.

The identity of the old man remains unclear, though context implies that he may be Pattern Recognition's protagonist Cayce Pollard's father, having removed himself from the channels of normal life to focus on disrupting what he sees as criminal elements operating in the United States Government.

Tracking Tito's family is a man known as Brown, a brusque and obstinate lead covert operative for a shadowy organization of unclear connection to the U.S. government. Of neoconservative orientation, Brown appears to have a background in law enforcement, but little training in tradecraft. Brown and his team attempt to track the activities of the old man and Tito with the help of Brown's captive Milgrim, whom he has translate the volapük-encoded Russian used by Tito's family to communicate. Milgrim is addicted to anti-anxiety drugs and is kept docile and compliant by Brown, who controls his supply of Rize. Brown believes that Tito and the old man are in possession of information that would, if revealed, undermine public confidence in the U.S.'s participation in the Iraq War. In his attempts to capture them and their data, however, Brown is instead fed disinformation through the old man's intricate schemes.

The three strands of the novel converge on a shipping container of unspecified cargo that is being transported via a circuitous route to an unknown destination. In Vancouver, the old man's team, with Hollis in tow, irradiate the shipping container, which is revealed to contain millions of U.S. dollars diverted from Iraq reconstruction funds.

== Background and composition ==
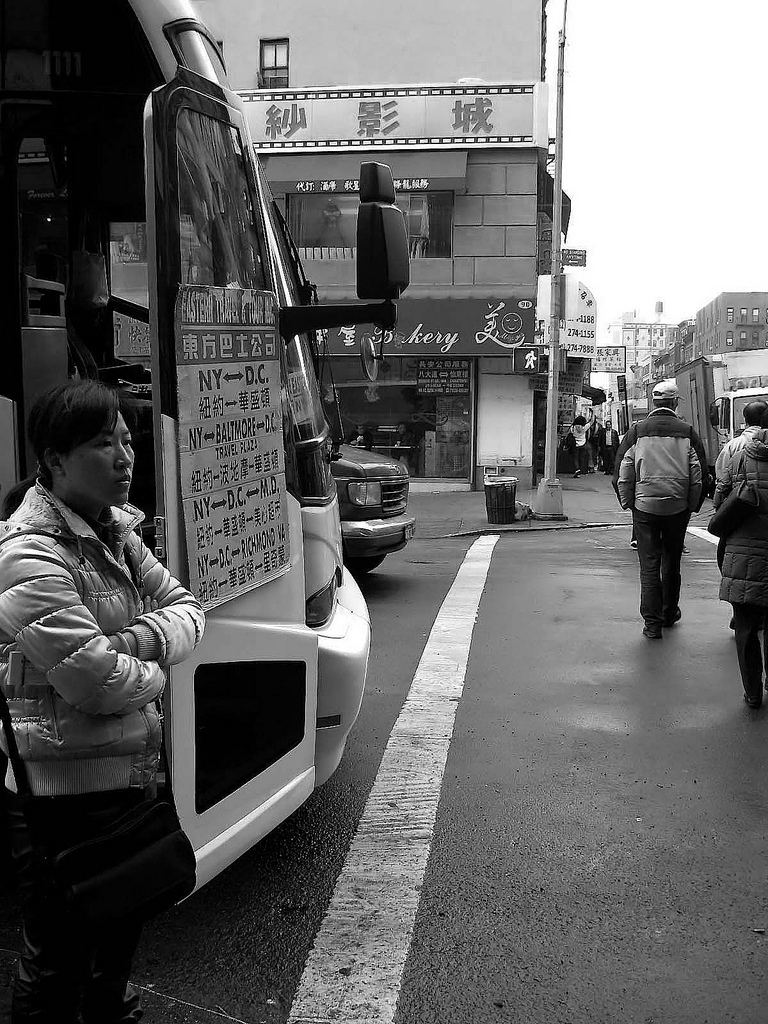
Canal Street in Lower Manhattan, whose visual imprint inspired the character of Tito.

=== Initial conception and development ===
The writing process for Spook Country began for Gibson with a desire to write a novel, but without any ideas or themes that he wished to explore. The impetus for the story grew out of the author's visual impressions of Lower Manhattan in winter, from which the character of Tito emerged. Little of the material in his original pitch of the novel (posted online as part of an early promotional campaign by the book's publishers) survived in the final draft. The original proposal focused on "Warchalker", an obscure Iraqi warblog which chronicles the story of a disappeared consignment of millions of Iraqi reconstruction money. The readers of the blog included a female networks theorist interested in locative technology, and a Manhattanite of mixed heritage who freelanced with his family for organized crime. The plot would have followed those readers' attempt to track a shipping container through Warchalker on behalf of an unnamed villain.

The characters from the proposal did appear in the final version, albeit in much-altered form. An early draft featuring the musician-turned-journalist Hollis and half-Cuban spy Tito as the two protagonists did not satisfy Gibson, and so he introduced the character of Milgrim, the drug-addled translator. The story of Tito's family of Chinese exiles in Cuba turning to crime was not based on historical events, though their role as "illegal facilitators" was inspired by real crime families specializing in smuggling, a phenomenon Gibson encountered in the course of his work with the futurist consulting entity Global Business Network. Although he had intended his 2003 novel Pattern Recognition to be a standalone work, elements of it manifested in the script of its eventual successor, including the character of amoral marketing guru Hubertus Bigend. As Gibson developed the plot, "it became apparent that Node, the shadowy magazine startup, was way Bigendian", and thus Spook Country came to inhabit the same fictional universe as its predecessor. In a January 2007 interview, the author revealed that the later novel was set in the spring of 2006, and described the shared world of the novels as "more or less the one we live in now".

Gibson was first introduced to locative media websites through links from a friend, and initially found the phenomenon to be "excessively nerdy and very conceptual". Despite his finding compelling the idea of a digital grid mapping the surface of the earth, Gibson saw little storytelling traction in geocaching and geohacking, and instead reworked the material into the locative art of the novel. "When I started, I thought that the 'locative art' stuff would work the way immersion technology did in my earlier fiction", he commented in a subsequent interview. "Then I started liking that it wasn’t going to do that." The conception of the artworks in the novel was derived from the lowbrow art movement, and was inspired by the movement's talismanic Juxtapoz, the only art magazine Gibson was reading regularly at the time. The novel exhibits Gibson's characteristic brand awareness (a key plot element of Pattern Recognition), which he honed while poring over catalogues of products as part of his writing process. The author found the writing process unnerving, as the solution to the mystery of the container – the novel's MacGuffin – did not come to him until after he had written several hundred pages of manuscript.

=== Pre-release ===
Spook: as spectre, ghost, revenant, remnant of death, the madness lingering after the corpse is sloughed off. Slang for intelligence agent; agent of uncertainty, agent of fear, agent of fright.

Country: in the mind or in reality. The World. The United States of America, New Improved Edition. What lies before you. What lies behind. Where your bed is made.

Spook Country: the place where we have all landed, few by choice, and where we are learning to live. The country inside and outside of the skull. The soul, haunted by the past, of what was, of what might have been. The realization that not all forking paths are equal – some go down in value.

The ground of being pervaded with spectres. The ground of actuality, similarly teeming.

In traversing spook country, we ourselves have been transformed, and we will not fully understand how until we are no longer what we were.

— Exploration of the novel's title by Jack Womack

Gibson announced the novel on October 6, 2006, on his blog, where fragments of the work were posted non-sequentially for some time, leading to much reader speculation on the content and plot of the novel. The following day, the blog featured an exploration of the mooted title by close friend and collaborator Jack Womack. In August 2007, Gibson made an appearance in the virtual world Second Life to give a reading of the novel; later reflecting on the experience, he remarked that the Second Life construct was "a lot more corporate" than he had imagined. A report in The Times described the event as "heavily freighted with meaning" in light of Gibson's role in shaping conceptions of cyberspace and virtual worlds.

In an interview to promote the release of the novel, Gibson revealed that one of the issues that had most affected his writing process since Pattern Recognition was the sense that everything in the text was potentially searchable online. "It's as though there is a sort of invisible hyperlink theoretical text that extends out of the narrative of my novel in every direction", he commented. A recipient of an advanced reading copy initiated Node Magazine, a literary project in the guise of the novel's fictional magazine, with the intent of annotating the novel. The author, under the nom de plume patternBoy, mobilised a cadre of volunteers to track the references and collate the cloud of data surrounding the work – those elements of the story with footprints on internet resources such as Google and Wikipedia. The project had precedent in Joe Clark's PR-Otaku, an attempt at logging and annotating Pattern Recognition, but whereas that took several years to develop, Node was complete before the novel was even published.

== Themes ==
In 2006, if you invite the zeitgeist in for tea, that's what you're going to get.

— Gibson in August 2007 responding to the suggestion that Spook Country was his most political novel

Spook Country explores themes relating to espionage, war profiteering and esoteric martial artistry, as well as familiar themes from the author's previous novels such as the unintended uses for which technology is employed (e.g. locative art) and the nature of celebrity. The author's preoccupation with semiotics and apophenia in Pattern Recognition is carried over in the sequel. In a review for The Guardian, Steven Poole observed that "This is a novel about, and also full of, ghost-signs, or signs that may not be signs, and about the difficulty of telling the difference. Gibson delights in saturating the pages with data that may or may not encode clues for the reader."

=== Eversion of cyberspace ===
Through its treatment of locative technology, the novel revisits notions of virtual reality and cyberspace prominent in Gibson's early cyberpunk fiction. One character proposes that cyberspace is everting; becoming an integral and indistinguishable element of the physical world rather than a domain to be visited. During the book tour for the novel, Gibson elaborated on this theme, proposing that the ubiquity of connectivity meant that what had been called "cyberspace" is no longer a discrete sphere of activity separate from and secondary to normal human activity, but that those increasingly less common parts of normal life free from connectivity were the exception. "If the book has a point to make where we are now with cyberspace", he commented, it was that cyberspace "has colonized our everyday life and continues to colonize everyday life."

=== Class divide ===
One of the elements of the novel that the author found most poignant was that of class division and how there is a subset of people who have access to a world of power and wealth that the vast majority will never experience, of which Gibson cited Brown and his evidently routine use of a private jet as an example. The author felt that at the time of writing, such social chasms were widening, and drew parallels to the Victorian era as well as to the world of his breakthrough novel Neuromancer (1984) in which there is no middle class, only the super-rich and a predominantly criminal underclass.

It's a very Victorian world, and when I was writing Spook Country I kept running up against that feeling that the world I'm actually trying to predict is becoming more Victorian, not less. Less middle class, more like Mexico, more like Mexico City. And I think that's probably not a good direction.

— William Gibson, in interview with Amazon.com

In an interview with The Telegraph promoting the novel, Gibson conjectured that the world was moving to a situation wherein social status is determined by "connectivity" – access to communications technology – rather than material wealth.

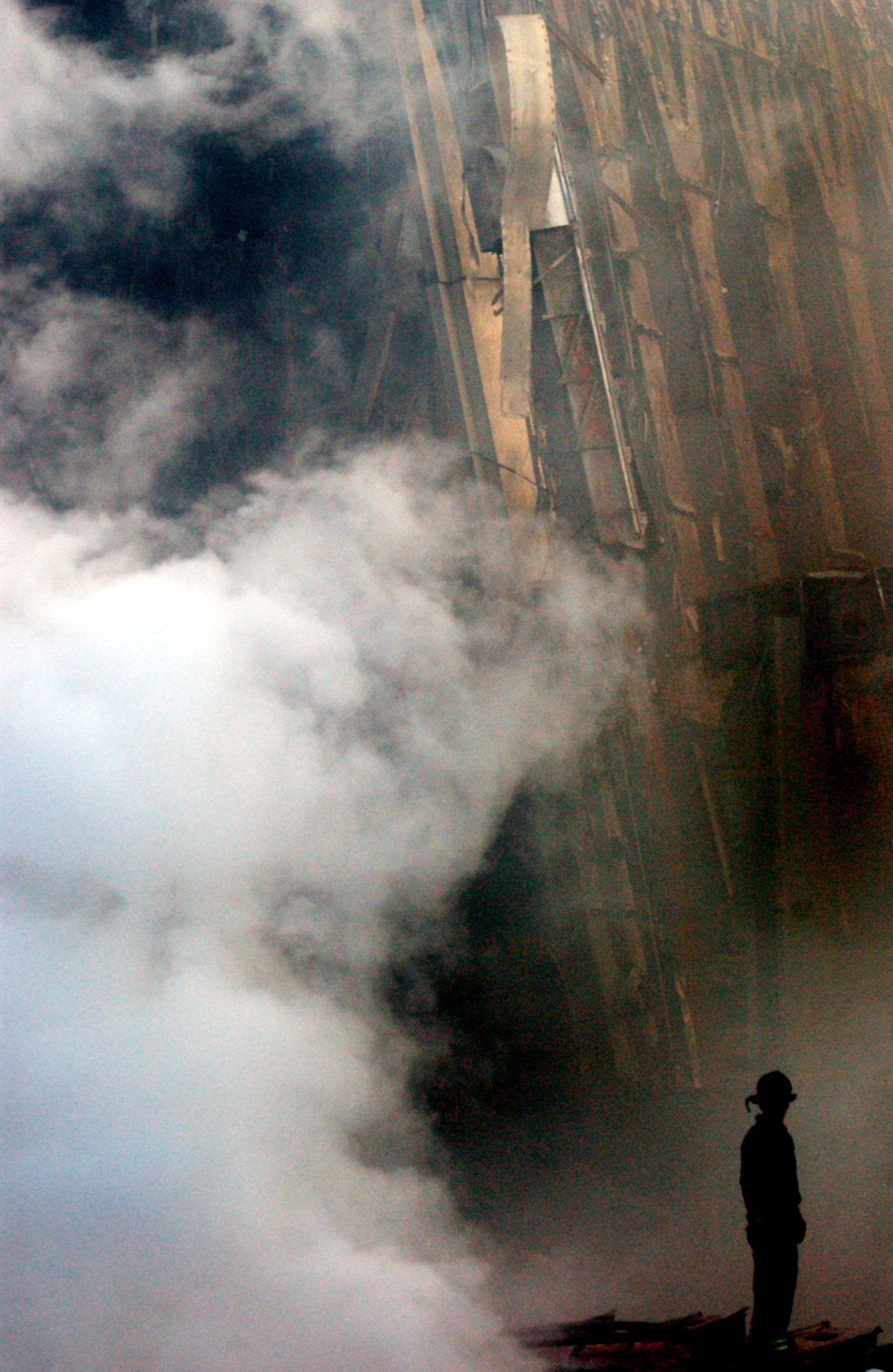
A firefighter stands amidst the wreckage of the World Trade Center in New York City. Gibson saw the September 11 attacks as a nodal point in history, and their sociopolitical impact was a major theme of the novel.

=== Political climate of the post-9/11 world ===
In some ways September 11 was the true beginning of the 21st century [and] at this point it is still perhaps only our narrative. But the way we have responded to it is changing things for other people in the world, too. So it is now becoming part of their narratives and their narratives will have different versions of the cause and its effects of the event. So it is like this seismic shock, one whose waves are still moving up the time line. At its epicentre is 9/11.

— William Gibson, in interview with the Brisbane Times, September 7, 2007

Sociocultural changes in post-September 11 America, including a resurgent tribalism and the "infantilization of society", first appeared as a prominent motif in Gibson's thought with Pattern Recognition. Gibson interpreted the attacks as a nodal point, "an experience out of culture" which irrevocably changed the course of history and marked "the true beginning of the 21st century." After crafting 100 pages of that novel, he was compelled to re-write the main character's backstory, which the attacks had suddenly rendered implausible; this he called "the strangest experience I've ever had with a piece of fiction." The result saw Gibson noted as one of the first novelists to use the attacks to inform their writing. Nathan Lee in The Village Voice advanced the notion that while Pattern Recognition focused to an extent on "specifying the ambient sense of invasiveness in all aspects of life after the collapse of the towers", Spook Country accepted that anxiety as a premise, and was thus "the more reflective, less unnerving of the two novels".

Politics is present as an underlying theme in Spook Country to a greater extent than in any of the author's previous novels. The novel can be read as an exploration of the fear, uncertainty and pervasive paranoia of an America riven by the unending and divisive Iraq War. Although he had avoided overtly political themes in his previous work out of a distaste for didacticism, Gibson found that in the Bush era, politics had "jacked itself up to my level of weirdness". Of the climate in Washington, D.C. during that period, he disclosed in a 2007 interview that "I like the sheer sort of neo-Stalinist denial of reality. That's what makes it work. It's interesting." Mike Duffy in Scotland on Sunday characterized the novel as a "startling, effective guidebook to post-9/11 America"; Dave Itzkoff of The New York Times elaborated, proposing that it was "arguably the first example of the post-post-9/11 novel, whose characters are tired of being pushed around by forces larger than they are – bureaucracy, history and, always, technology – and are at long last ready to start pushing back".

== Interpretation and reception ==
Spook Country appeared on bestseller charts by August 7, 2007, five days after release. The novel entered The Washington Post hardcover fiction bestseller list for the Washington, D.C., area in late August at #4, and by September had reached #2 in San Francisco and Canada. It was listed at #6 on Publishers Weekly hardcover fiction bestseller list for the U.S., as well as on The New York Times Best Seller list for hardcover fiction (where it lasted three weeks). It earned a nomination for the BSFA Awards for best novel of 2007, and finished second to Michael Chabon's The Yiddish Policemen's Union in the standings for the Locus Award for Best Science Fiction Novel the following year. In August 2008, Rebecca Armstrong of The Independent named Spook Country as one of the "Ten Best Thrillers".

Mike Duffy felt that although the novel was less overtly science fiction than Gibson's earlier novels, it retained their "wit, virtuosity and insights", and had "the same giddy mix of techno-fetishism, nuanced edge and phraseological finesse which enlivened his previous work". "Spook Country, in essence," pronounced The Telegraph's Tim Martin, "is a classic paranoid quest narrative, but one that refashions the morbid surveillance tropes of the Cold War for a post-Iraq era". Ken Barnes of USA Today found that "[l]andscapes, events and points of view shift constantly, so that the reader never truly feels on solid ground", but judged the novel to be a "vivid, suspenseful and ultimately coherent tale". In a review for The Washington Post, Bill Sheahan hailed the novel's capture of the zeitgeist, and compared it to the acclaimed literary fiction of Don DeLillo:

Despite a full complement of thieves, pushers and pirates, Spook Country is less a conventional thriller than a devastatingly precise reflection of the American zeitgeist, and it bears comparison to the best work of Don DeLillo. Although he is a very different sort of writer, Gibson, like DeLillo, writes fiction that is powerfully attuned to the currents of dread, dismay and baffled fury that permeate our culture. Spook Country – which is a beautifully multi-leveled title – takes an unflinching look at that culture. With a clear eye and a minimum of editorial comment, Gibson shows us a country that has drifted dangerously from its governing principles, evoking a kind of ironic nostalgia for a time when, as one character puts it, "grown-ups still ran things." In Spook Country, Gibson takes another large step forward and reaffirms his position as one of the most astute and entertaining commentators on our astonishing, chaotic present.

— Bill Sheahan, The Washington Post, July 22, 2007.

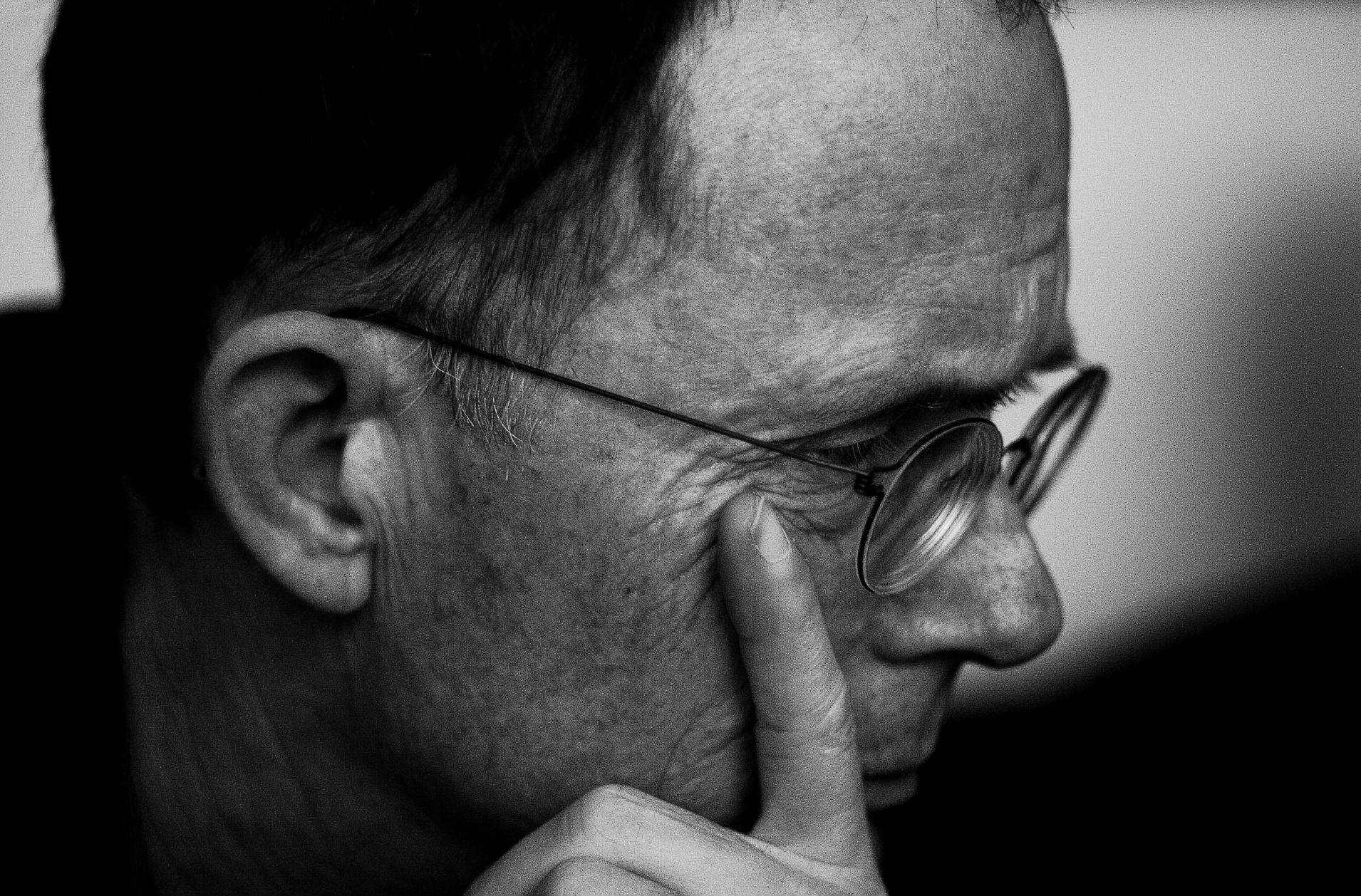
Author William Gibson, whose command of prose in the novel was the subject of critical acclaim.

=== Plot, prose, and character ===
Ed Park of the Los Angeles Times hailed the novel as a "puzzle palace of bewitching proportions and stubborn echoes", noting the fact that antihero Hubertus Bigend was the most prominent link to Pattern Recognition as "deliciously sinister". Tim Martin thought that the plot lacked direction at times. Although he conceded that the novel's main Henry/Bigend storyline felt lightweight, Matt Thorne, writing in The Independent, conjectured that it was part of Gibson's conscious design that that thread "plays out against a backdrop of hidden machinations that have a much darker, wider resonance". Thorne declared Spook Country a more substantial novel than its predecessor on this basis. John Casimir of The Sydney Morning Herald concurred, writing that despite the similarity in the plots of the novels, the narrative foundation of the later novel was firmer, its structure "more sophisticated" and its "seams less visible".

Ed Park singled out the author's prose for praise, proclaiming that "[s]entence for sentence, few authors equal Gibson's gift for the terse yet poetic description, the quotable simile – people and products are nailed down with a beautiful precision approximating the platonic ideal of the catalog". Matt Thorne noted that while he found Gibson's tendency towards hyper-specificity initially irritating, "there's hypnotic quality to the relentless cataloguing". The author's prose was also extolled by Clay Evans of the Daily Camera, and by Benjamin Lytal in The New York Sun, who declared that "the real news, in Spook Country, is that much of the flair that Mr. Gibson once brought to descriptions of cyberspace seems to fit perfectly, now, on all kinds of things." In The Seattle Times, Nisi Shawl gushed that "[e]ven without the high cool quotient of the novel's contents, the pleasure of Gibson's prose would be enough inducement for most of us to immerse ourselves in this book...." Simon Cooper of The Book Show agreed with the commendations of Gibson's prose, but felt the plot and characterization let the book down:

There are some great lines and observations in Spook Country, but for me the parts were greater than the whole. Gibson is a master at rendering the all pervasive but subliminal paranoia of our high-tech market society. But whereas in Pattern Recognition he was able to combine this with a sustained focus, this time it didn't quite work. Partly this is because the three-way narrative seems to dissipate rather than successfully hold the disparate parts together. Partly I think it's because the main characters seem just too passive or detached to generate sufficient narrative tension. Still, Gibson is better than most writers with his take on the science-fictionalised present, and there is no denying that the book has moments of aphoristic brilliance.

— Simon Cooper, The Book Show, February 5, 2010.

In a review for The Providence Journal, Andy Smith remarked that the author was "a master of atmosphere, if not character" – a sentiment echoed by The Post and Courier's Dan Conover, who, although praising the novel's intelligence and contemporary relevance, felt that Gibson's underlying political pre-occupation and detached narration came at the expense of character development. Neil Drumming, of Entertainment Weekly, in awarding the novel a "B" rating concurred, complaining that the protagonists "often just feel like higher-tech automatons with useful features" whose actions are the product of manipulation by "external forces and cagey operatives" rather than conscious decisions. In The Daily Telegraph, Roger Perkins was more blunt, remarking that the "relentless pace and breathless dislocation" of the plot hid "character development that's as deep as dental veneer but equally shiny". Matt Thorne summed up the issue in opining that "The problem with a thriller which begins with a technology journalist talking to an experimental artist is that, no matter how exciting the events later become, it's hard to care."

=== Conclusion ===
Reviewers were divided as to the merits of the novel's ending. Andy Smith lamented that the finale of the "mostly intriguing" novel was "distinctly anticlimactic". Tim Martin wrote that it seemed "somehow less than the sum of its parts". Clay Evans dismissed it as "not especially meaningful, but fun", whereas Matt Thorne found it lacking "a traditional thriller's excitement". San Francisco Chronicle reviewer Michael Berry called it "an ingenious reversal" which proved that despite its apparent cynicism, the novel was "oddly optimistic for a ghost story". Overall, Thorne judged the novel ultimately unsatisfactory on account of the underwhelming ending and because Gibson "hides the full complications of the plot so successfully that it feels as if everything important is happening offstage". Roger Perkins judged the novel to be "a triumph of style over substance – which is exactly the way you suspect that Gibson wants it." His colleague Martin mused that along with the regular Gibsonian tropes, there was "something new ... a dark and very contemporary surge of suspicion and bad faith" in the novel which suggested that the author might be approaching the apex of his writing. Dan Conover concluded that while the "darkly comic satire" was "a worthy addition to the Gibson canon and a significant cultural artifact", it would not rank among the author's best works.
