= Node Magazine =

- Website type: Annotator
- Available in: English
- Owner: Sean Kearney
- Creator: patternBoy
- Website: http://www.nodemagazine.com/
- Commercial: No
- Registration: No
- Launched: February 7, 2007

Node Magazine is a literary project in the guise of a fictional magazine created to annotate the novel Spook Country by William Gibson.

The project is essentially a hypertext version of the novel. It takes its name from Node, a non-existent magazine in Spook Country owned by Hubertus Bigend, which employs the novel's protagonist to pursue the source of locative art.

The project drew attention from the novelist, and has been featured in The Guardian, The Washington Post, Salon, The Seattle Times and the Santa Cruz Sentinel. The academic literary critic John Sutherland has claimed that the project threatened "to completely overhaul the way literary criticism is conducted".

== Origin ==
The project was initiated when the recipient of an advanced reading copy of the novel mobilised "an army of volunteers" to track the references and assemble the cloud of data surrounding the novel – every element of the work which is searchable on internet resources such as Google and Wikipedia. The pseudonymous author, under the pen name patternBoy, conceived the Node project as "a multi-author blog of fictional news stories in the Spook Country universe", and did not anticipate that it would itself become the focus of media attention. He declared the launch of the Node tumblog sister-site to Node Magazine on June 24, 2007, with the following announcement:

With 42 days before the official release and a total of 84 chapters, I will begin posting two short (under 807 characters each in celebration of the official release date) chapter summaries each day. Quotations will be very sparse and all posts will contain my interpretations (and likely significant spoilers) re: the yet-to-be-released work.

The project has precedent in Joe Clark's PR-Otaku, an attempt at logging and annotating Gibson's preceding novel Pattern Recognition. Gibson has noted that while PR-Otaku "took a couple of years to come together", Node was complete before the novel was even published.

== Significance ==
Sutherland credits the project as "giving an extraordinary reading of [the] novel in which everything is concretized – solidity and specification is added to [the] text." He has conceived this as nothing less than a new form of hyper-annotation:

What the unknown Node-maestro has done is poles apart…[h]e's channelled the raw material supplied by his volunteers into a sign-posted route through Spook Country. It opens the way, I believe, to a new kind of critical commentary on texts. One can see, easily enough, how it could be extended to Paradise Lost, or Hamlet.

Gibson in turn has characterized the project as "a sort of little Wikipedia" for Spook Country, and has declared it to be "stunning," remarkably accurate, genuinely novel and "sort of scary." He has spoken of his newfound awareness when writing of "a ghostly cloud of hypertext hanging around the text of the manuscript," the alteration this has on the way readers experience the text, and the fact that all his research will be retraceable by readers of his work.
