= Pattern Recognition (novel) =

2003 novel by William Gibson

- Original first edition cover
- Author: William Gibson
- Language: English
- Series: Bigend cycle
- Genre: Science fiction
- Published: February 3, 2003 (G. P. Putnam's Sons)
- Publication place: United States
- Media type: Print (hardcover and paperback), audiobook
- Pages: 368 pp (hardcover)
- ISBN: 0-399-14986-4
- OCLC: 49894062
- Dewey Decimal: 813/.54 21
- LC Class: PS3557.I2264 P38 2003
- Followed by: Spook Country

Pattern Recognition is a novel by the American-Canadian science fiction writer William Gibson published in 2003. Set in August and September 2002, the story follows Cayce Pollard, a 32-year-old marketing consultant who has a psychological sensitivity to corporate symbols. The action takes place in London, Tokyo, and Moscow as Cayce judges the effectiveness of a proposed corporate symbol and is hired to find the creators of film clips anonymously posted to the internet.

The novel's central theme examines the human desire to detect patterns or meaning, and the risks of finding patterns in meaningless data. Other themes include methods of interpretation of history, cultural familiarity with brand names, and tensions between art and commercialization. The September 11, 2001, attacks are used as a motif representing the transition to the new century. Critics have noted that Pattern Recognition was influenced by Thomas Pynchon's postmodern detective story The Crying of Lot 49.

Pattern Recognition was Gibson's eighth novel and his first to be set in the contemporary world. Like his previous works, it has been classified as a science fiction and postmodern novel, with the action unfolding along a thriller plot line. Critics approved of the writing but found the plot unoriginal and some of the language distracting. The book peaked at number four on the New York Times Best Seller list, was nominated for the 2003 British Science Fiction Association Award, and was shortlisted for the 2004 Arthur C. Clarke Award and Locus Awards.

== Background ==
Before writing Pattern Recognition, the author, William Gibson, published seven novels (one co-written) and numerous short stories beginning in 1977. His previous novel, All Tomorrow's Parties, was published in October 1999 as the conclusion of the Bridge trilogy. Pattern Recognition was written between 2001 and 2002 while Gibson was living in Vancouver, British Columbia and released in February 2003. Pattern Recognition was originally intended to be a stand-alone novel, but afterwards Gibson wrote Spook Country and Zero History which take place in the same universe and use some of the same characters.

Gibson traveled to Tokyo in 2001 to prepare for this new novel, which takes place in London, Moscow, and Tokyo. He did not travel to London or Moscow but used interviews with friends and internet resources for research. In September 2001 Gibson had written about 100 pages but was struggling to finish. He stopped writing after watching the September 11, 2001 attacks on television and "realized [the novel] had become a story that took place in an alternate time track, in which Sept. 11 hadn't happened". He considered abandoning the novel but a few weeks later re-wrote portions to use the attacks as a motivating factor for the distress the main character feels. In a 2003 interview he said, "There I was, in the winter of 2001, with no idea what the summer of 2002 was going to be like. ... In the original post-9/11 draft, London felt more like London is feeling right now. Cayce keeps seeing trucks full of soldiers. But I took that out, because as it got closer to the time, it wasn't actually happening."

== Plot summary ==
Advertising consultant Cayce Pollard, who reacts to logos and advertising as if to an allergen, arrives in London in August 2002. She is working on a contract with the marketing firm Blue Ant to judge the effectiveness of a proposed corporate logo for a shoe company. During the presentation, graphic designer Dorotea Benedetti becomes hostile towards Cayce as she rejects the first proposal. After dinner with some Blue Ant employees, the company founder Hubertus Bigend offers Cayce a new contract: to uncover who is responsible for distributing a series of anonymous, artistic film clips via the internet. Cayce had been following the film clips and participating in an online discussion forum theorizing on the clips' meaning, setting, and other aspects. Wary of corrupting the artistic process and mystery of the clips, she reluctantly accepts. Cayce is not entirely comfortable with Ivy's chat group called "Fetish:Footage:Forum" (or F:F:F), as shown by the following excerpt:

There are perhaps twenty regular posters on F:F:F, and some much larger and uncounted number of lurkers. And right now there are three people in Chat, but there's no way of knowing exactly who until you are in there, and the chat room she finds not so comforting. It's strange even with friends, like sitting in a pitch-dark cellar conversing with people at a distance of about fifteen feet.

A friend from the discussion group, who uses the handle Parkaboy, privately emails her saying a friend of a friend has discovered an encrypted watermark on one clip. They concoct a fake persona, a young woman named Keiko, to seduce the Japanese man who knows the watermark code. Cayce, along with an American computer security specialist, Boone Chu, hired to assist her, travels to Tokyo to meet the man and retrieve the watermark code. Two men attempt to steal the code but Cayce escapes and travels back to London. Boone travels to Columbus, Ohio to investigate the company that he believes created the watermark. Meanwhile, Blue Ant hires Dorotea who reveals that she was previously employed by a Russian lawyer whose clients have been investigating Cayce. The clients wanted Cayce to refuse the job of tracking the film clips and it was Dorotea's responsibility to ensure this.

Through a completely random encounter Cayce meets Voytek Biroshak and Ngemi, the former an artist using old ZX81 microcomputers as a sculpture medium, the latter a collector of rare technology (he mentions purchasing Stephen King's word processor, for example). Another collector, and sometime 'friend' of Ngemi's, Hobbs Baranov, is a retired cryptographer and mathematician with connections in the American National Security Agency. Cayce strikes a deal with him: she buys a Curta calculator for him and he finds the email address to which the watermark code was sent. Using this email address Cayce makes contact with Stella Volkova whose sister Nora is the maker of the film clips.

Cayce flies to Moscow to meet Stella in person and watch Nora work. Nora is brain damaged from an assassination attempt and can only express herself through film. At her hotel, Cayce is intercepted and drugged by Dorotea and wakes up in a mysterious prison facility. Cayce escapes; exhausted, disoriented and lost, she nearly collapses as Parkaboy, who upon Cayce's request was flown to Moscow, retrieves her and brings her to the prison where the film is processed. There Hubertus, Stella and Nora's uncle Andrei, and the latter's security employees are waiting for her. Over dinner with Cayce, the Russians reveal that they have been spying on her since she posted to a discussion forum speculating that the clips may be controlled by the Russian Mafia. They had let her track the clips to expose any security breaches in their distribution network. The Russians surrender all the information they had collected on her father's disappearance and the book ends with Cayce coming to terms with his absence while in Paris with Parkaboy, whose real name is Peter Gilbert.

== Characters ==
- Cayce Pollard – A 32-year-old woman who lives in New York City. She pronounces her given name "Case" although her parents named her after Edgar Cayce. She uses her interest in marketing trends and fads, and her psychological sensitivity to logos and advertising, in her work as an advertising consultant. Her sensitivity becomes a phobia towards older corporate mascots, especially the Michelin Man. She wears only black, gray or white, usually Fruit of the Loom shrunken cotton T-shirts (all tags removed) with Levis jeans (with the trademarks filed off the buttons) or skirts, tights, boots, as well as a black Buzz Rickson MA-1 bomber jacket. (Buzz Rickson did not produce the MA-1 in black, but due to demand created by the novel, began offering a "William Gibson collection" black MA-1.)
- Hubertus Bigend – The 35-year-old founder of advertising agency Blue Ant. He was born in Belgium but educated at a British boarding school and at Harvard University.
- Dorotea Benedetti – The representative of the graphic design company. She has a background in industrial espionage and is secretly hired to encourage Cayce to leave London without accepting Bigend's offer to track the film clips.
- Bernard Stonestreet – A representative of the advertising agency Blue Ant.
- "Parkaboy"/Peter Gilbert – Cayce's friend from the online discussion forum. He lives in Chicago and describes himself as a "middle-aged white guy since 1967".
- Boone Chu – A Chinese-American living in Washington state, but raised in Oklahoma. He had a failed start-up company specializing in security. He is hired to assist Cayce in the search for the maker of the footage.
- Voytek Biroshak – A blond man born in Poland and raised in Russia. He acquires and sells antique calculators to raise funds for an exhibition on Sinclair ZX81 computers.
- Damien Pease – A 30-year-old friend of Cayce whose flat she stays at while in London. He is a video director shooting a documentary on WWII battleground excavation near Stalingrad.
- Hobbs Baranov – A former NSA cryptographer and mathematician. He collects antique calculators and sells intelligence as he squats near Poole with a Gypsy group.
- Ivy – Creator of website, discussion group, and chatroom Fetish:Footage:Forum that Cayce frequents. The website's intention is to discuss the anonymous film postings.

== Style and story elements ==
The novel uses a third-person narrative in the present tense with a somber tone reminiscent of a "low-level post-apocalypticism". Cayce's memories of the September 11, 2001 attacks, which briefly use the future tense, are told by Gibson as "a Benjaminian seed of time", as one reviewer calls it, because of the monistic and lyrical descriptions of Cayce's relationship to objects with the attacks in the background. Two neologisms appear in the novel: gender-bait and mirror-world. Gibson created the term mirror-world to acknowledge a locational-specific distinction in a manufactured object that emerged from a parallel development process, for example opposite-side driving or varied electrical outlets. Gender-bait refers to a male posing as a female online to elicit positive responses. The term coolhunter, not coined by Gibson but used in the marketing industry for several years, is used to describe Cayce's profession of identifying the roots of emerging trends.

The September 11, 2001 attacks are used as a motif representing a break with the past with Cayce's father, who disappears during the attacks, as the personification of the 20th century. Gibson viewed the attacks as a nodal point after which "nothing is really the same". One reviewer commented that in "Gibson's view, 9-11 was the end of history; after it we are without a history, careening toward an unknown future without the benefit of a past—our lives before 9-11 are now irrelevant." Cayce's search for her father and Damien's excavation of the German bomber symbolize the historicist search for a method to interpret people's actions in the past. Coming to terms with her father's disappearance may be interpreted as a requiem for those lost to the 20th century, something that may have been influenced by Gibson coming to terms with the loss of his own father.

The film clips are a motif used to enhance the theme of the desire to find meaning or detect patterns. They are released over the internet and gain a cult following, in the same way that the lonelygirl15 videoblog gained an international following in 2006. Corporate interest in the footage is aroused by its originality and global distribution methods. The characters debate whether the anonymous clips are part of a complete narrative or a work in progress, and when or where they were shot. This enigmatic nature of the footage is said to metaphorically represent the nature of the confusing and uncertain post-9/11 future. The author Dennis Danvers has remarked that the footage being edited down to a single frame is like the world compressed into a single novel. The footage, released freely to a global audience with a lack of time or place indicators, has also been contrasted to Pattern Recognition written under contract for a large corporation and which uses liminal name-dropping that definitively sets it in London, Tokyo, and Moscow in 2002.

== Major themes ==
=== Pattern recognition ===
Parkaboy says you should go to new footage as though you've seen no previous footage at all, thereby momentarily escaping the film or films you've been assembling with, consciously or unconsciously, since first exposure. Homo sapiens are about pattern recognition, he says. Both a gift and a trap.

— Cayce Pollard, Pattern Recognition, pages 22–23.

The central theme throughout the novel involves the natural human propensity to search for meaning with the constant risk of apophenia. Followers of the seemingly random clips seek connections and meaningfulness in them but are revealed to be victims of apophenia as the clips are just edited surveillance camera footage. Likewise, Cayce's mother turns to investigating electronic voice phenomena after Cayce's father disappears. Science fiction critic Thomas Wagner underscores the desire for meaning, or pattern recognition, using a comparison between the film clips and Cayce's search for her father after the attacks:

[T]he very randomness and ineffability of the clips flies in the face of our natural human tendency towards pattern recognition ... [T]he subculture that surrounds "following the footage" ... [is] an effective plot device for underscoring the novel's post-9/11 themes: to wit, the uncertainty of the fabric of day-to-day life people began to feel following that event … [We] as people don't like uncertainty, don't like knowing that there's something we can't comprehend. And if we can't fit something into an existing pattern, then by golly we'll come up with one.

Within the marketing world, Cayce is portrayed not as an outside rebel, but rather a paragon of the system. Inescapably within the system, she seeks an epistemological perspective to objectively interpret patterns. The review of the novel in The Village Voice calls this search "a survival tactic within the context of no context—dowsing for meaning, and sometimes settling for the illusion of meaning".

=== Memory of history ===
The future is there ... looking back at us. Trying to make sense of the fiction we will have become. And from where they are, the past behind us will look nothing at all like the past we imagine behind us now. ... I only know that the one constant in history is change: The past changes. Our version of the past will interest the future about the extent we're interested in whatever past the Victorians believed in. It simply won't seem very relevant.

— Cayce Pollard (echoing the views of Parkaboy), Pattern Recognition, page 59.

Using 20th-century relics, such as a Curta calculator, an excavated Stuka, Hobbs Baranov, and Voytek's planned ZX81 show, Gibson raises the question of how a contemporary society views past societies. Gibson portrays the past century as dominated by conflict, suspicion, and espionage. Following the disappearance of Cayce's father, a designer of embassy security systems, on September 11, 2001, Cayce is left feeling "ungrieved" until she reviews footage and records of that day tracking his movements until he vanishes.

Following this line of thought Gibson raises the question of how the future will view today's society. The novel "adopts a postmodern historicism" perspective, through the arguments presented by Bigend, Cayce, and Parkaboy. Bigend and Cayce's view of history are compared to those of philosopher Benedetto Croce in that they believe history is open for interpretation when re-written from the frame of reference of another society. Parkaboy rejects this view, believing that history can be an exact science.

=== Originality and monoculture ===
The book explores a tension between originality and monoculture by focusing on the artist's relationship with a commercialized world and its marketing of free art and consumer products. Critic Lisa Zeidner argues that the artist's "loyalty and love" involved with creating originality counters Bigend's assertion that everything is a reflection of something else and that the creative process no longer rests with the individual. Commercialism is portrayed as a monoculture that assimilates originality. The Tommy Hilfiger brand is used as an example, "simulacra of simulacra of simulacra. A dilute tincture of Ralph Lauren, who had himself diluted the glory days of Brooks Brothers, who themselves had stepped on the product of Jermyn Street and Savile Row ... There must be some Tommy Hilfiger event horizon, beyond which it is impossible to be more derivative, more removed from the source, more devoid of soul."

One critic points out that the marketing agency Blue Ant is named after the wasp Blue Ant: "it's a wasp with a painful sting. The female hunts for a ground-dwelling cricket. She paralyses it with a sting and lays her egg on it. The still living yet immobile cricket becomes food for the wasp's young. What a clever metaphor for the process of targeting, commodifying, and marketing cool." On the other hand, as Rudy Rucker notes, while new art is constantly threatened by commodification, it is dependent on the monoculture for its launching point and uniqueness. Gibson's product positioning language and Cayce's analysis of consumerist trends show that society is not a victim of consumerism, but rather its creator who helps shape it without ever stepping outside it. Alex Link argues that rather than a simple attack on consumerism outright, the novel outlines a complex interrelationship between art, brand design, and terrorism as varying attitudes to history, terror, and community.

=== Branding, identity, and globalization ===
The novel's language is viewed as rife with labeling and product placements. Postmodern theorist Fredric Jameson calls it "a kind of hyped-up name-dropping ... [where] an encyclopaedic familiarity with the fashions ... [creates] class status as a matter of knowing the score rather than of having money and power". He also calls it "postmodern nominalism" in that the names express the new and fashionable. This name-dropping demonstrates how commercialism has created and named new objects and experiences and renamed (or re-created) some that already existed. This naming includes nationalities; there are eight references to nationality (or locality) in the first three pages. Zeidner wrote that the novel's "new century is unsettlingly transitional making it difficult to maintain an individual identity". One character argues that "there will soon be no national identity left … [as] all experience [will be] reduced, by the spectral hand of marketing, to price-point variations on the same thing." This is juxtaposed against the footage that contains no hints of time period or location. Globalization is represented by characters of varying nationalities, ease of international travel, portable instant communication, and commercial monoculture recognizable across international markets. As an example, Gibson writes how one 'yes or no' decision by Cayce on the logo will impact the lives of the people in remote places who will manufacture the logos and how it will infect their dreams.

== Genre ==
[W]e have no idea, now, of who or what the inhabitants of our future might be. In that sense, we have no future. Not in the sense that our grandparents had a future, or thought they did. Fully imagined cultural futures were the luxury of another day, one in which 'now' was of some greater duration. For us, of course, things can change so abruptly, so violently, so profoundly, that futures like our grandparents' have insufficient 'now' to stand on. We have no future because our present is too volatile. ... We have only risk management. The spinning of the given moment's scenarios. Pattern recognition.

— Hubertus Bigend, Pattern Recognition, pages 58–59.

While some reviewers regard the novel as a thriller, others see it as an example of post-millennial science fiction with stories set in the "technocultural future-present". Some reviewers note that the novel furthers the post-millennial trend in science fiction of illustrating society's inability to imagine a definitive future and the use of technologies once considered advanced or academic now commonplace within society and its vernacular. Gibson said that the only science fiction elements are "[t]he Footage and Cayce's special talents" but that he "never bought that conceit that science fiction is about the future". Dennis Danvers explained the use of science fiction as a narrative strategy:

[s]cience fiction, in effect, has become a narrative strategy, a way of approaching story, in which not only characters must be invented, but the world and its ways as well, without resorting to magic or the supernatural, where the fantasy folks work. A realist wrestling with the woes of the middle class can leave the world out of it by and large except for an occasional swipe at the shallowness of suburbia. A science fiction writer must invent the world where the story takes place, often from the ground up, a process usually called world-building. In other words, in a science fiction novel, the world itself is a distinctive and crucial character in the plot, without whom the story could not take place, whether it's the world of Dune or Neuromancer or 1984. The world is the story as much as the story is in the world. Part of Gibson's point ... is that we live in a time of such accelerated change and layered realities, that we're all in that boat, like it or not. A novel set in the "real world" now has to answer the question, "Which one?"

These elements, and the use of the September 11, 2001, attacks as a breaking point from the past, led academics to label it a postmodern novel. The attacks mark the point where the 'modern', that is the 20th-century certainty in society's advancement towards a better future, changed to the 'postmodern', that is the 21st-century uncertainty in which future will develop. Fredric Jameson finds Gibson using culture as the determinant of change for the first time with this novel, rather than technology. Jameson focuses on the novel's "postmodern nominalism" that uses brand names to refresh old objects and experiences.

In post-structural literary theory Cayce is compared with the main character, Oedipa Maas, of Thomas Pynchon's The Crying of Lot 49 as detectives interpreting clues but with neither the character nor the reader knowing if there actually is a pattern to be found and, if there is one, whether it is real or conspiracy. Gibson's use of name-dropping brands to create a sense of "in-group style … of those in the know" is traced back to Thomas Pynchon's 1963 novel V. . Gibson's writing style is said to be similar to Raymond Chandler's detective stories and Alfred Hitchcock's thrillers that used MacGuffins (the identity of the maker of the footage, in this case) to drive the story. Gibson's social observations are influenced by the works of Naomi Klein and Malcolm Gladwell.

While markedly different from his previous writing, in that it is not set in an imaginary future with imaginary technologies, Pattern Recognition includes many of his previous elements, including impacts of technology shifts on society, Japanese computer experts and Russian mafia figures. In common with Gibson's previous work, Paul Di Filippo found in Pattern Recognition: "the close observation of the culture's bleeding edge; an analysis of the ways technology molds our every moment; the contrasting of boardroom with street; the impossibility and dire necessity of making art in the face of instant co-optation; the damaged loner facing the powers-that-be, for both principle and profit".

== Reception ==
Pattern Recognition was released on February 3, 2003, as Gibson launched a 15-city tour. The novel was featured on the January 19 cover of The New York Times Book Review. In the American market it peaked at number four on the New York Times Best Seller list for hardcover fiction on February 23 and spent nine weeks on USA Today's Top 150 Best-Selling Books, peaking at number 34. In the Canadian market, the novel peaked at number three on The Globe and Mail's best seller list on February 15 in the hardcover fiction category. The novel was shortlisted for the 2004 Arthur C. Clarke Award and the British Science Fiction Association Award.

Gibson's writing was positively received by science fiction writers Dennis Danvers, Candas Jane Dorsey, and Rudy Rucker. Rucker has written: "[w]ith a poet's touch, he tiles words into wonderful mosaics" and Danvers wrote that "no sentence has a subject if it can do without one". One critic found the prose to be as "hard and compact as glacier ice" and another that it "gives us sharply observed small moments inscribed with crystalline clarity". Gibson's descriptions of interiors and of the built environments of Tokyo, Russia and London were singled out as impressive, and The Village Voice's review remarked that "Gibson expertly replicates the biosphere of a discussion board: the coffee-shop intimacy, the fishbowl paranoia, the splintering factions, the inevitable flame war". Lisa Zeidner of The New York Times Book Review elaborated:

As usual, Gibson's prose is ... corpuscular, crenelated. His sentences slide from silk to steel, and take tonal joy rides from the ironic to the earnest. But he never gets lost in the language, as he sometimes has in the past. Structurally, this may be his most confident novel. The secondary characters and their subplots are more fully developed, right down to their personal e-mail styles. Without any metafictional grandstanding, Gibson nails the texture of Internet culture: how it feels to be close to someone you know only as a voice in a chat room, or to fret about someone spying on your browser's list of sites visited.

Filled with name-dropping of businesses and products, such as MUJI, Hotmail, iBook, Netscape, and G4, the language of the novel was judged by one critic to be "awkward in its effort to appear "cool" " while other critics have found it overdone and feared it would quickly date the novel. The Pittsburgh Post-Gazette review commented that the "constant, unadulterated "hipster-technocrat, cyber-MTV" lingo [is] overdone and inappropriate" On the technology, Cory Doctorow found Gibson's use of watermarks and keystroke logging to be hollow and has noted that "Gibson is no technologist, he's an accomplished and insightful social critic ... and he treats these items from the real world as metaphor. But ... Gibson's metaphorical treatment of these technologies will date this very fine book".

Some critics found the plot to be a conventional "unravel-the-secret" and "woman on a quest" thriller. Toby Litt wrote that "[j]udged just as a thriller, Pattern Recognition takes too long to kickstart, gives its big secrets away before it should and never puts the heroine in believable peril". The conclusion, called "unnecessarily pat" by one critic, was compared by Litt with the "ultimate fantasy ending of 1980s movies – the heroine has lucked out without selling out, has kept her integrity but still ended up filthy rich." The review in the Library Journal called the novel a "melodrama of beset geekdom" that "may well reveal the emptiness at the core of Gibson's other fiction", but recommended it for all libraries due to the author's popularity.

== Publication history ==
Book covers for the (top left to right) North American (paperback), British (hard cover), British (paperback), Dutch, French, (bottom left to right) Spanish, Portuguese, German, Japanese, and Polish releases

The hardcover edition, released in February 2003, was published by the Penguin Group imprint G. P. Putnam's Sons. Berkley Books published the trade paperback one year later, on February 3, 2004, and a mass market paperback in February 2005. In the UK the paperback was published by Penguin Books a year after its Viking Press imprint published the hardcover version. In 2004 it was published in French, Danish, Japanese, German, and Spanish. In 2005 the book was published in Russia. The translation made by Nikita Krasnikov was awarded as the best translation of the year.

Tantor Media published the 10.5-hour-long, unabridged audiobook on April 1, 2004, and re-released it on January 1, 2005. Voiced by Shelly Frasier, it was criticized by John Adams of Locus as being pleasant but with distracting dialects.

== Adaptations ==
The digital radio station BBC 7 broadcast (now BBC Radio 4 Extra) an abridged version of the novel, voiced by Lorelei King, in five 30-minute episodes in February and October 2007. Post-punk band Sonic Youth included a track called "Pattern Recognition" on their 2004 album Sonic Nurse that opens with the lyric "I'm a cool hunter making you my way". A film adaptation was initiated in April 2004 with producer Steve Golin's production company Anonymous Content and the studio Warner Bros. Pictures hiring director Peter Weir. Screenwriters David Arata, D. B. Weiss, and Weir co-wrote the screenplay but in May 2007, Gibson commented on his personal blog that he believed Weir would not be proceeding with the project.
