= Cayce Pollard =

Fictional protagonist of Pattern Recognition by William Gibson

Cayce Pollard is the fictional protagonist of William Gibson's 2003 novel Pattern Recognition.

== Personal history ==
[Cayce] will watch the towers burn, and eventually fall, and though she will know she must have seen people jumping, falling, there will be no memory of it.

It will be like watching one of her own dreams on television. Some vast and deeply personal insult to any ordinary notion of interiority.

An experience outside of culture.

—Pattern Recognition, 15. "Singularity", page 137

Aged 32 during the events of Pattern Recognition, Cayce lives in New York City. Though named by her parents after Edgar Cayce, she pronounces her given name "Case". She is a freelance marketing consultant, a coolhunter with an unusual intuitive sensitivity for branding, manifested primarily in her physical aversion to particular logos and corporate mascots. A notable exception to her ability to immediately discern semiotic content in imagery is the succession of images of the September 11 attacks in 2001, for her "an experience outside culture". The attacks had added significance to Cayce's backstory in that they encompassed the disappearance of her father, Win, which in turn impelled her mother, Cynthia, to exploring electronic voice phenomena as her own means of divining patterns in the background static. Cayce is left feeling "ungrieved" for her father until she reviews footage and records of that day tracking his movements until he vanishes.

== Apparel ==
CPUs for the meeting, reflected in the window of a Soho specialist in mod paraphernalia, are a fresh Fruit T-shirt, her black Buzz Rickson's MA-1, anonymous black skirt from a Tulsa thrift, the black leggings she'd worn for Pilates, black Harajuku schoolgirl shoes. Her purse-analog is an envelope of black East German laminate, purchased on eBay if not actual Stasi-issue then well in the ballpark.

She sees her own gray eyes, pale in the glass, and beyond them Ben Sherman shirts and fishtail parkas, cufflinks in the form of the RAF roundel that marked the wings of Spitfires.

CPUs. Cayce Pollard Units. That's what Damien calls the clothing she wears. CPUs are either black, white, or gray, and ideally seem to have come into this world without human intervention.

What people take for relentless minimalism is a side effect of too much exposure to the reactor-cores of fashion. This has resulted in a remorseless paring-down of what she can and will wear. She is, literally, allergic to fashion. She can only tolerate things that could have been worn, to a general lack of comment, during any year between 1945 and 2000. She's a design-free zone, a one-woman school of anti whose very austerity periodically threatens to spawn its own cult.

— Pattern Recognition, 2. "Bitch", page 8.

As a consequence of her sensitivity, Cayce dresses in plain clothing she has either bought or rendered unadorned with brand markings of any kind (one possible exception is her "Luggage Label" hip bag, bought from Parco in Tokyo). These are referred to as "Cayce Pollard Units" or C.P.U.s, a term initially used by her friend Damien, and subsequently by Cayce, although never aloud. They are typically Fruit of the Loom shrunken cotton T-shirts worn with black oversized Levi's 501s, skirts, tights, boots, and a Buzz Rickson MA-1 bomber jacket.

== In pursuit of the footage ==
Cayce's role in Pattern Recognition begins with her arrival in London in August 2002, commissioned by marketing firm Blue Ant to judge the effectiveness of a proposed corporate logo for a footwear company. In accordance with her terms, dictated in advance, she rejects the logo but does not explain her judgement. After dinner with some Blue Ant employees, the company founder Hubertus Bigend propositions Cayce with a new mission: to uncover those responsible for distributing a succession of mysterious, anonymous, artistic film clips ("the footage") on the internet. Cayce had been following the footage and is a participant in Fetish : Footage : Forum, a cult-like online discussion forum hosting a collection of obsessives theorizing on the clips' meaning, setting, sequence and origin. Although wary of corrupting the artistic process and mystery of the clips, she reluctantly accepts.

An acquaintance from the forum passes Cayce a lead of someone who claims to have discovered an encrypted watermark on one clip. After concocting a fake persona to seduce the Tokyo native who claims to know the watermark code, Cayce travels to Tokyo to meet him and retrieve the code. Thwarting an attempt by two unknown men to steal the code, Cayce escapes and returns to London. There, she learns from Blue Ant that she has been investigated by a shady group of Russians who had wanted her to refuse the job of tracking the footage. Through a chance encounter, Cayce meets a pair of London natives dealing in antiquated technological artifacts who put her in contact with a collector, the retired cryptographer and mathematician Hobbs Baranov. Cayce strikes a deal with Baranov: she buys an artifact he dearly covets but cannot afford (a factory prototype of the earliest Curta calculator) and in return he deciphers the email address to which the watermark code was sent. Using this email address, Cayce makes contact with Stella Volkova, and through their correspondence learns that the legendary maker of the footage is Stella's sister Nora.

Cayce flies to Moscow to meet Stella in person and to witness Nora crafting the footage. It emerges that Nora had been catastrophically injured in a Claymore mine explosion that killed their parents years earlier and because of brain damage can only express herself through film. After returning to her hotel, Cayce is drugged and abducted, and wakes up in a mysterious prison facility outside the city. Cayce escapes; exhausted, disoriented and lost, she nearly collapses, but is rescued and later brought to the prison where the film is processed. There, Bigend, Stella and Nora's uncle Andrei, and the latter's security employees are waiting for her. Over dinner with Cayce, the Russians reveal that they have been spying on her since she posted to a discussion forum speculating that the clips may be controlled by the Russian Mafia. They had let her track the footage to expose any security breaches in their distribution network. The Russians surrender all the information they had collected on her father’s disappearance and the book ends with Cayce coming to terms with his absence; "she was weeping for her century, although whether the one past or the one present she doesn't know".

== Literary analysis and significance ==
Cayce is located by literary critic Pramod Nayar in a line of "information-living" Gibson characters beginning with Bobby Newmark (Count Zero, Mona Lisa Overdrive, the Sprawl trilogy) and continuing with Colin Laney (Idoru, All Tomorrow's Parties, the Bridge trilogy). Ulrike K. Heiser concurs, citing the reassurance Cayce gets from logging into Fetish : Footage : Forum after a flight as indicative that she is the latest in a tradition of technomadic Gibsonian protagonists "with rootedness in the virtual rather than the real" who "find their true homes in the non-spatial reaches of digital networks".

In her quest to uncover the meaning of the footage, Cayce is haunted with epistemological doubt; her compulsion to seek answers to whether there is an order to the footage or a creator behind it gives rise to the central thematic element of the novel – the centrality of pattern recognition and corresponding ubiquitous risk of apophenia in the contemporary world. Post-structural literary theorist Richard Skeates compared Cayce with Oedipa Maas, the protagonist of Thomas Pynchon’s novel The Crying of Lot 49, as detectives interpreting clues but with neither the character nor the reader knowing if there actually is a pattern to be found and, if there is one, whether it is real or conspiracy. Critic Jeremy Pugh proffers that Gibson employs "the precocious Pollard to personify and humanize the uncertain anxiety, optimistic hope, and downright fear many feel when looking to the future."

For cultural historian Jeffrey Melnick, Cayce's obsession with the footage is born out of her exceptional experience of the 9/11 attacks as something which "fundamentally challenged the commercialization of all human experience and emotion". Like the imagery of 9/11, the footage is free of the hegemonic cultural context of the capitalist superstructure and thereby seems to escape commodification, to be beyond "the reified society of brands in which objects assume the status of social relations in contrast to people's objectified ones ... to which Cayce has such an involuntary affinity". Pollard is ever-aware of her complicity as a conduit between the authentic culture of the street and the reconstructed cultural units manifested as products of branded corporations. Philosopher Nikolas Kompridis casts her desire in terms of a novelty which defies contextualization, positing that Cayce is "yearning for the unconsumably and unsubsumably new", citing a line preceding a description of the footage: "It is as if she participates in the very birth of cinema, that Lumière moment, the steam locomotive about to emerge from the screen, sending the audience fleeing, out into the Parisian night." For Kompridis, the footage is at the crux of Cayce's existential angst as an agent of unearthing novelty and facilitating commodification who also holds out hope for the possibility of a future immune to commodification and instrumentalisation.

== Bibliography ==
- Gibson, William (2003). Pattern Recognition. New York: G.P. Putnam's Sons. ISBN 0-399-14986-4. OCLC 49894062.
