= Monotone-Silence Symphony =

Piece of minimalist music by Yves Klein

The entire handwritten score for the Monotone-Silence Symphony, showing the extreme sparsity of the work

The Monotone-Silence Symphony (French: Symphonie Monoton-Silence) is a piece of minimalist music by the French artist Yves Klein. It consists of 20 minutes of an orchestra performing the chord of D major, followed by a 20 minute silence.

The original score calls for an ensemble consisting of 20 singers, 10 violins, 10 cellos, 3 double basses, 3 trumpets, 3 flutes and 3 oboes.

Klein stated that he conceived the idea for the work in 1947 (as written on the score) or 1949 (in interviews and texts). In the first public performance in 1960, three naked models on stage were painted with International Klein Blue body paint during the performance, and left imprints of their bodies on canvas.

Composer Éliane Radigue, a friend of Yves Klein's who was married to Arman at the time, recounted how Klein, at night on a beach in Nice in 1954 and shortly after his discovery of the Lettrists, had started improvising in glossolalia with a group of friends. Eventually, the whole group got into it, and the idea came to them of making a continuous sound. Radigue, the only musician in the group, took care of tuning the voices together to produce a chord. A few years later, Yves Klein asked Radigue to write the Monotone-Silence Symphony for him, but Radigue refused, "for many reasons", then redirected Klein to composer Louis Saguer, to whom Klein finally entrusted the symphony's production. This anecdote challenges Klein's statement about conceiving the idea for the work in 1947 or 1949 and ultimately his authorship of the idea.

== See also ==
- 4' 33", a 1952 piece of music with extended silence by John Cage
