= Nodal =

Nodal may refer to:

- Nodal, the adjectival form of the noun wikt:node
- Nodal homolog, a protein encoded by the gene NODAL and responsible for left-right asymmetry
- Nodal (software), a novel music composition program
- Christian Nodal (born 1999), Mexican singer and songwriter
