= Nodule =

Nodule may refer to:

- Nodule (geology), a small rock or mineral cluster
- Manganese nodule, a metallic concretion found on the seafloor
- Nodule (medicine), a small aggregation of cells
- Root nodule, a growth on the roots of legumes
- A feature of mollusc sculpture
- Nodule of vermis, an external feature of the cerebellum
