= NODE (wireless sensor) =

NODE+
- Developer: Variable Inc.
- Manufacturer: Variable Inc.
- Type: Handheld sensor platform
- Connectivity: USB, Bluetooth 2.1 Bluetooth 4.0 low energy
- Dimensions: 1 inch in diameter by 3.75 inches wide
- Website: variableinc.com

NODE+ is a first-generation handheld wireless sensor platform developed by Variable Inc. The device measures approximately 1 inch in diameter and 3.75 inches in length and communicates with mobile devices using Bluetooth 4.0 Low Energy technology.

As of September 2014, NODE+ supported 16 interchangeable sensor modules capable of detecting variables such as color, gases, ambient temperature, barometric pressure, motion, and surface temperature. The platform includes an open application programming interface (API) for software developers. A commercial license from Variable Inc. is required for the development of commercial applications that utilize NODE+ sensors.

NODE+ has been adopted in educational settings through a partnership with Vernier Software & Technology and is used in classrooms and research institutions. It has also been employed in industrial Internet of Things (IoT) applications. The device is manufactured in the United States.

== History ==
NODE+ was developed in 2011 by George Yu in Chattanooga, Tennessee. Before founding Variable Technologies LLC (later Variable Inc.), Yu was involved in research and development projects for NASA and the U.S. Department of Homeland Security.

On 23 March 2012, NODE+ raised $76,340 through a Kickstarter crowdfunding campaign, exceeding its $50,000 goal. A subsequent campaign for CHROMA, a color-sensing module, raised $39,473 on 7 December 2012, also surpassing its target.

Variable Inc. opened a second Knoxville, Tennessee office in December 2012. This office handles business development and government relations.

In June 2013, NODE+ was demonstrated at the Cisco Live U.S. event in Orlando, Florida, during a presentation on Internet of Things (IoT) strategies.

In September 2013, Variable Inc. released an Android-compatible version of the NODE+ platform. The device had been only iOS compatible.

A third Kickstarter campaign, launched in late 2013 for the NODE+CO2 module—part of the OXA gas sensor family—raised $26,046, slightly above its goal.

In June 2014, Variable Inc. launched a software development competition titled "HACKANODE."

As of September 2018, NODE+ no longer appears to be commercially available.

== Hardware ==
The NODE+ base unit includes a 9-axis motion engine (3-axis gyroscope, 3-axis accelerometer, and 3-axis magnetometer), 16MB of onboard storage, and two module ports. It supports Bluetooth 2.1 and Bluetooth Low Energy connectivity and includes a micro-USB charging port. The device contains a crypto chip within the firmware and features dimmable blue LEDs. Its lithium-polymer battery supports approximately 12–14 hours of continuous Bluetooth use and up to 54 days in standby mode.

== Mobile applications ==
- GTI Spindle VibePro: Used for surface temperature analysis of machinery.
- Velos: A color matching and data collection application.
- Cargosense: A logistics tool for monitoring shipped goods.
- Vernier Graphical Analysis: Used in educational environments to collect and analyze sensor data.
- Little Lives: A school management app incorporating temperature checks.
- LRV Guru: A tool for calculating color contrast ratios.
- Paint Pro / Paint Pro Classic: Applications for comparing and matching paint colors.
- Scientific Sci-Fi Scanner: An educational app that integrates environmental sensor data.
- Aeronaut: A flight instrument app using altitude and barometric data.
- WKC Fix-O-Meter: A fitness application for teaching lifting techniques.
