= Noad (surname) =

Noad is a surname. Notable people with the surname include:

- Charles Noad (born 1947), British programmer and Tolkien scholar
- Frederick Noad (1929–2001), American guitarist
- Henry Minchin Noad (1815–1877), British chemist and physicist
- Joseph Noad (c. 1797 – 1873), Canadian politician
- Timothy Noad, British calligrapher
