= Zero History =

2010 novel by William Gibson

- Author: William Gibson
- Language: English
- Series: Blue Ant series
- Publisher: G. P. Putnam's Sons (United States); Viking (United Kingdom)
- Publication date: 2010
- Pages: 404 (United States edition)
- ISBN: 978-0-399-15682-3
- OCLC: 505419399
- LC Class: PS3557.I2264 Z47 2010
- Preceded by: Spook Country

Zero History is a 2010 novel by William Gibson. Published by G. P. Putnam's Sons in the United States and Viking in the United Kingdom, it concludes the Blue Ant sequence begun with Pattern Recognition (2003) and continued in Spook Country (2007). Although the books share characters and concerns, Gibson did not plan them in advance as a trilogy.

The novel follows former singer Hollis Henry and recovering drug addict Milgrim, both of whom work for advertising executive Hubertus Bigend. Hollis searches for the designer behind Gabriel Hounds, a secretive clothing label that has gained a following without conventional marketing. Milgrim investigates military garment design as Bigend attempts to enter the military contracting business. Their assignments become entangled with corporate surveillance, a rival contractor, and the kidnapping of a researcher whose work could give Bigend an advantage in financial markets.

Like the preceding Blue Ant novels, Zero History is set in the recognizable contemporary world rather than an imagined future. Critics have described its close treatment of existing technology as a form of science-fictional estrangement in which digital networks, surveillance, and virtuality have become embedded in ordinary life. The novel also examines the relationship among military design, streetwear, branding, and cultural exclusivity, while Milgrim's recovery develops its concerns with personal agency, memory, and the reconstruction of identity.

Contemporary reviews were broadly favorable. Critics frequently praised Gibson's prose, cultural observation, and depiction of technology and material objects, while disagreeing over the novel's plotting, characterization, accessibility, and conclusion. Milgrim received particular praise for his movement from dependency toward greater independence. Zero History was a finalist for the 2011 John W. Campbell Memorial Award and placed fifth in the science-fiction novel category of the 2011 Locus Awards reader poll.

== Background and publication ==
Published in 2010 by G. P. Putnam's Sons in the United States and Viking in the United Kingdom, Zero History completed the Blue Ant sequence begun with Pattern Recognition and continued in Spook Country. The sequence, however, was not planned in advance. Gibson said that he approached each novel as a potentially independent work and did not know, after completing Spook Country, whether a third book would follow. As he began composing a new novel, characters and material from the preceding books reasserted themselves. Milgrim reemerged as a changed viewpoint character encountering a world from which he had been largely absent for a decade. Gibson found him useful because his unfamiliarity with contemporary life made his reactions less predictable and created opportunities for other characters to explain developments to him. Other returning characters likewise emerged during composition rather than through a predetermined plan for a concluding volume.

Gibson described the composition of Zero History as a sequential process in which he continuously revised earlier material as the manuscript developed. He did not send the opening chapters to his initial readers until the first three seemed to form a coherent beginning. Gibson credited writers Jack Womack and Paul J. McAuley with reading pages frequently. McAuley also checked the novel's London material, while Louis Lapprend assisted with details concerning Paris. Scott Thill reported that Gibson delivered the manuscript at the end of March 2010, and Gibson confirmed by April 7 that the novel was complete. Gibson said that the internet primarily changed activities associated with composition, including research, communication, and the circulation of material, rather than increasing the speed at which he wrote.

Joshua Rothman placed Zero History within Gibson's turn from imagined futures toward fiction closely engaged with the contemporary world, describing the three Blue Ant novels as set roughly in the year before each was published. Gibson explained that he adopted this approach because the actual twenty-first century had come to seem stranger and more complex to him than most imagined science-fictional futures. He deliberately situated the novels in specific contemporary years, with the sequence extending broadly from 2001 to 2010. Gibson fixed Zero History in the period before the introduction of the iPad and considered adding the device after its release anachronistic. Twitter, by contrast, entered Milgrim's experience soon after Gibson began using the service himself. Gibson characterized the three novels as attempts to dissolve the boundary between science fiction and other forms of fiction by describing the present with the estranging effect of an imagined future.

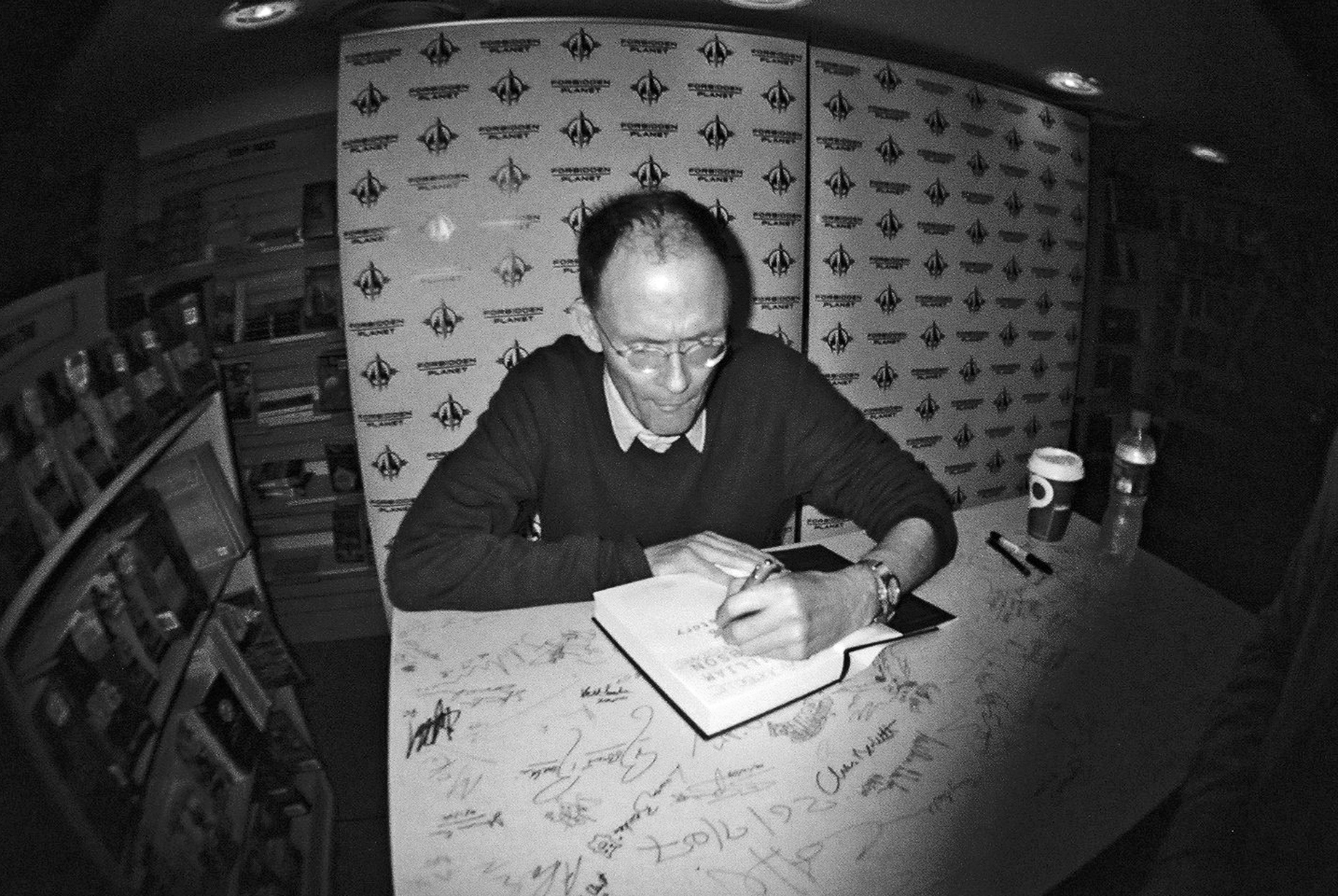
Gibson signing copies of Zero History in London in October 2010

Gibson treated research as part of ordinary experience, drawing on conversations, reading, and internet searches. In the novel's acknowledgments, he credited Michaela Sachenbacher and Errolson Hugh with introducing him to the organization and culture of a secretive clothing brand. He also credited Bruce Sterling with suggesting an "ugly T-shirt" concept after Gibson asked him about surveillance cameras. For the modeling career of Meredith Overton, Gibson drew on Jenna Sauers's anonymous memoir for Jezebel, which recounted frequent international travel, agency-controlled expenses, delayed payments, and the limited earnings of models outside the industry's highest tier. The novel's London motorcycle courier material drew on Mark Gardiner's 2009 Motorcyclist feature examining the couriers' work, equipment, finances, occupational risks, and support infrastructure.

Books on Tape released an unabridged audiobook narrated by Robertson Dean on September 7, 2010. A United States paperback edition followed from Berkley on August 2, 2011. That year, Penguin reissued the Blue Ant novels alongside Gibson's Bridge trilogy as part of a uniform edition.

== Plot ==
Former Curfew singer Hollis Henry, financially diminished by the global financial crisis, reluctantly agrees to work again for Hubertus Bigend, the wealthy and secretive founder of the branding agency Blue Ant. Bigend hires her to identify the creator of Gabriel Hounds, an elusive clothing label whose limited-production garments appear anonymously in selected boutiques and attract a devoted following without advertising. Hollis traces the label through London's fashion world while remaining wary of Bigend's intention to commercialize whatever she discovers.

Milgrim, a recovering prescription drug addict employed by Bigend, now works as a researcher for Blue Ant. Seeking what he considers a recession-proof business, Bigend is preparing to pursue a military clothing contract. He sends Milgrim to South Carolina to photograph and make tracings of design details from a pair of United States Army battle dress uniform trousers. The assignment attracts the attention of Defense Criminal Investigative Service agent Winnie Tung Whitaker, who is investigating illegal procurement activities involving Gracie, a former military contractor. Winnie persuades Milgrim to provide information and establishes a private Twitter account through which they can communicate discreetly.

Hollis's inquiries lead her to the band The Bollards, whose keyboardist "Olduvai" George is the boyfriend of designer Meredith Overton. Meredith possesses information about Gabriel Hounds, and agrees to help only if Blue Ant recovers a missing shipment of expensive shoes. After Bigend's organization locates them, Meredith nevertheless refuses to identify the label's designer, believing Gabriel Hounds should remain independent of corporate control.

Milgrim discovers that Blue Ant security operative Sleight has been monitoring him through a transmitter concealed in his company-issued phone while secretly supplying information to Gracie. Milgrim removes the transmitter and places it in a baby carriage belonging to associates of Russian organized crime. Foley, one of Gracie's operatives, follows the false signal and is severely beaten after confronting them. Sleight's betrayal leaves Milgrim exposed to Gracie's organization.

Foley later attempts to intercept Milgrim, Hollis, and Heidi while Aldous is driving them through London in Blue Ant's armored truck. Foley's car blocks their path while another vehicle closes from behind. Aldous uses the truck to ram Foley's car backward into the street, strikes it again, and positions the truck to block the passage while the others escape. The confrontation further escalates the conflict between Bigend and Gracie's organization.

Hollis also worries about her partner Garreth, the former special operations soldier introduced in Spook Country, who is recovering from injuries sustained during an unauthorized BASE jump from Dubai's Burj Khalifa. As he recovers, Garreth quietly assembles a network of friends and former colleagues experienced in surveillance, security, and covert operations, including associates connected with the mysterious old man for whom he previously worked.

Hollis eventually reaches a discreet Paris boutique operated by Bo, where she meets the designer responsible for Gabriel Hounds. The unnamed designer, strongly implied to be Cayce Pollard from Pattern Recognition, explains that the label survives by limiting production, avoiding publicity, and relying on reputation rather than marketing. When the designer begins to reveal her identity, Hollis stops her. Hollis can therefore truthfully tell Bigend that she does not know who created Gabriel Hounds, protecting the designer and the label's independence.

Bigend is also financing Bobby Chombo, the socially isolated mathematician and geospatial specialist previously encountered in Spook Country. Chombo is developing software that can detect patterns in financial market order flows before they become apparent to other traders. Gracie's organization recognizes his value, kidnaps him, and demands Milgrim in exchange. Bigend considers surrendering Milgrim, but Hollis and Garreth oppose the plan.

Using the name Wilson, Garreth organizes Chombo's rescue at Little Wormwood Scrubs. His team includes Fiona, Heidi, Ajay, and Pep, with Ajay disguised as Milgrim for the exchange. Beforehand, Pep uses an experimental T-shirt that causes some surveillance systems to omit its wearer from archived footage. He enters the kidnappers' vehicle and plants evidence intended to direct police attention toward Gracie's organization. Milgrim and Fiona provide aerial surveillance with two quiet inflatable drones made from reflective material. Fiona pilots a manta ray-shaped drone equipped with night vision, while Milgrim controls a penguin-shaped drone carrying a compact Taser.

Foley and another kidnapper arrive with Chombo as Gracie watches from concealment with a folding rifle. Ajay approaches them posing as Milgrim, and the team intervenes to free Chombo. When Gracie prepares to shoot him, Milgrim maneuvers the penguin drone into position and activates the Taser, incapacitating Gracie. Hollis calms Chombo by singing while the team completes the rescue.

After the rescue, Bigend dismisses Sleight and other disloyal members of Blue Ant. Hollis accepts Garreth's marriage proposal, and they prepare to leave London for Berlin. Milgrim learns that the medication he has continued taking for months consists of placebo tablets, demonstrating that he is no longer physically dependent on the drug. He begins a relationship with Fiona and gains greater independence from Bigend. Although Bigend fails to acquire Gabriel Hounds, he turns his attention to new ventures. The novel ends with Milgrim and Fiona aboard Bigend's ekranoplan, traveling toward Iceland as Bigend pursues another project.

== Themes and analysis ==
=== The contemporary present and genre ===
Zero History produces a science-fictional effect while remaining set in the recognizable contemporary world. Scholarly readings describe the Blue Ant trilogy as combining literary realism with a perspective that renders familiar objects and technologies cognitively strange. Rather than introducing a conventional novum, the novel treats existing technoculture with sufficient distance and descriptive intensity that ordinary products, including Gabriel Hounds clothing, acquire a nearly speculative character. Gibson's close observation makes the present appear unfamiliar, leading the novel to be described as "science fiction of the present." Smartphones, social media, location tracking, and pervasive surveillance function not as futuristic inventions but as normalized features of a society structured by advertising and security systems.

This effect also depends on the novel's movement away from cyberspace as a separate virtual realm. The trilogy has been placed within postcyberpunk because its physical and virtual environments are interconnected rather than opposed. Milgrim's mundane use of Twitter contrasts with the immersive cyberspace of Neuromancer, reflecting the extent to which network technology has become ordinary. The shift does not represent a simple replacement of older technologies by newer ones, since obsolete and persistent systems continue to shape the characters' environment. Phones, surveillance networks, financial markets, clothing, and movement through cities instead form parts of a single informational world in which virtuality is embedded within material and social life.

=== Fashion, branding, and military design ===
Fashion in Zero History operates as a system for communicating information, cultural knowledge, and social distinctions. The meanings attached to clothing and brands depend on an observer's ability to recognize their codes and understand their place within specialized cultures. Gabriel Hounds creates desirability by withholding information, restricting access, and avoiding conventional advertising. Gibson described secret brands as restoring exclusivity through controlled knowledge, while the search for the label centers less on the garments themselves than on its unusual method of generating interest. Recognizing the brand requires specialized knowledge, making its apparent invisibility a source of cultural value. Its distinctive objects promise authenticity within a culture of manipulated trends, but secrecy also functions as a marketing strategy rather than placing the label outside consumer culture.

The novel extends this fashion economy into military design and government contracting. Gibson described Zero History as an extended consideration of military garment design and its influence on streetwear, arguing that United States military clothing supplied foundational design codes for much twentieth-century menswear. Fashion exclusivity and military secrecy operate as parallel information economies, while marketing and military activity increasingly employ similar methods of research, prediction, and control. Bigend's proposed apparel business combines technical design, government procurement, cultural influence, and his belief that military contracts are comparatively resistant to economic downturns. This convergence connects advertising with security culture, surveillance, and psychological operations. Military design moves into civilian fashion, while branding and consumer research become tools through which Bigend attempts to enter military contracting.

=== Corporate power, surveillance, and agency ===
Critical readings of Zero History locate Bigend's power in his control of information, employment, money, and surveillance rather than in formal political authority. His monitoring of the protagonists restricts their privacy and autonomy, while their dependence on Blue Ant limits the choices available to them. Across the trilogy, Bigend develops from an ambiguous patron into an antagonist whose pursuit of military contracts and advance financial information extends his ambitions beyond cultural marketing into governmental and financial influence. His interest in Gabriel Hounds and military clothing follows the same pattern: he identifies cultural activity outside his existing reach and attempts to absorb it into his commercial operations. This power is reinforced by a society in which advertising, surveillance, and security systems have become ordinary parts of mediated experience.

Resistance therefore takes the form of withholding information and preserving limited areas of personal and creative control. Hollis protects the Gabriel Hounds designer by refusing to learn her identity, preventing Bigend from acquiring information that he could use to exploit the label. Gabriel Hounds itself resists conventional branding through secrecy and restricted production, although Bigend attempts to convert that resistance into another marketing strategy. Parody and culture jamming provide similar means of disrupting manipulated identities and corporate authority. The novel does not present complete escape from commodification; the more immediate question is whether creators can retain some control over how their work is marketed. Gibson likewise described commercial compromise as a matter of degree rather than a simple choice between independence and selling out. These readings present resistance as a defense of personal integrity and creative autonomy within a commercial system that remains largely intact.

=== Material objects and urban space ===
Clothing, tools, and other material objects carry unusual narrative weight in Zero History. Dense description makes ordinary branded products appear nearly novum-like, rendering their familiar qualities newly strange. Gibson said that he selected objects from a mental collection according to their resonance with the developing narrative and used signs of wear to make their histories perceptible. Damien Broderick and Paul Di Filippo connect this method with his earlier work as a "picker," someone who identifies overlooked objects possessing cultural or commercial value. They describe Bigend as a similar figure who searches for emerging designs, technologies, and subcultures that can be recognized and exploited before others perceive their significance. Material objects consequently promise tactile authenticity while remaining vulnerable to collection, classification, and resale.

Kolbuszewska interprets the Cabinet hotel through the tradition of the Wunderkammer, or cabinet of curiosities. Its rooms and objects produce knowledge through material experience, emotion, intuition, and play, in contrast with Bigend's acquisition of information for prediction and market control. The Cabinet preserves ambiguity and encourages personal interpretation, whereas Bigend seeks to make information measurable and commercially useful. At the same time, signs, brands, and images can conceal the labor and material production underlying commodities. Attention to physical objects and emotional experience therefore offers a limited alternative to Bigend's instrumental approach, although neither the Cabinet nor its contents exist entirely outside commercial culture.

The novel's global cities similarly combine physical experience with memory, information, and displacement. London appears provisional and difficult to decode, while the Cabinet functions as both an enclave and a distorted reflection of the surrounding city. Urban spaces emerge as collages assembled from direct observation, personal memory, and mediated images. Movement through London and Paris resembles flânerie, but it also reflects economic and personal precarity, particularly in Meredith's history of international modeling. Scanlan describes Hollis's displacement as "global homesickness," in which weak attachment to a particular location coexists with mobile international affiliations. Hollis's hotel residence and Garreth's unfinished apartment serve as provisional homes, while relationships become increasingly important to her sense of belonging.

=== Memory, identity, and history ===
Milgrim's recovery provides the novel's central treatment of identity and personal agency. Gibson described him as reborn after treatment, with an increasing capacity for humanity and moral choice. His development moves away from dependency, surveillance, and coerced service toward greater autonomy. Initially reliant on Bigend and others to explain the decade from which he was largely absent, Milgrim gradually develops the judgment and confidence to act independently. His continued association with Bigend becomes increasingly voluntary, while his growing initiative marks his recovery from passivity. This recovery also strengthens his ability to understand specialized cultures, establish relationships, and reconstruct a life outside addiction.

The phrase "zero history" refers most directly to Milgrim's absence from conventional credit, address, and institutional records. His lack of a usable recent past also reflects atemporality, a broader weakening of chronological and historical continuity within the novel. The phrase extends to the clandestine lives of other characters and to a contemporary world in which personal history is unstable and open to reconstruction. Westfahl contrasts Milgrim with Armitage in Neuromancer, arguing that Milgrim accepts the discontinuities among his former selves and becomes more capable rather than being destroyed by internal division. The effort by Milgrim and Hollis to construct new lives eventually becomes more important than resolving the Gabriel Hounds mystery. Atemporality also appears in vintage garments and Gabriel Hounds, which seem to resist rapid fashion cycles while remaining connected to cultural status and global finance.

== Reception ==
Contemporary reviews of Zero History were broadly favorable, although critics repeatedly questioned its plotting and characterization. A Bookmarks digest of seven major newspaper reviews praised Gibson's treatment of global culture while identifying reservations about the narrative, the development of its characters, and the possibility that its contemporary technologies would quickly appear dated. The major trade publications offered similarly mixed assessments. Publishers Weekly considered the focus on twenty-first-century brand positioning distinctive and described Gibson's prose as more distilled and austere than in his earlier science fiction, but argued that objects and brands were more fully realized than the people using them. Kirkus Reviews praised the textured prose and observations of contemporary life while criticizing the plot, largely unseen antagonists, and romantic elements. Despite these reservations, it found the novel unsettling and memorable.

Gibson's prose, cultural observation, and creation of atmosphere attracted some of the strongest praise. Writing in The Observer, James Purdon commended his close attention to technology and material objects, cultural acuity, and control of pacing. He considered the novel satisfying and tightly plotted, although he criticized its expository dialogue and argued that the contemporary setting provided less scope for technological invention. In The Independent, James Urquhart described the book as intelligent and seductive, praising the way commercial espionage, threatened violence, surveillance, and manipulated information deepen the characters' uncertainty about one another. He also commended Gibson's understated dialogue and the interdependence of his characters. The New Yorker likewise praised the novel's narrative momentum and its combination of entertainment with philosophical questions about surveillance, cultural manipulation, and commodified exclusivity.

Reviews differed more sharply over the novel's structure and conclusion. The A.V. Club praised Gibson's combination of intellectually engaging concepts with pulp storytelling but found the narrative loose and some of its promises incompletely fulfilled. It argued that the Gabriel Hounds mystery lost urgency as the novel progressed, although Hollis and Milgrim's attempts to construct new lives eventually became more important than Bigend's objectives. INDY Week found the accumulation of information initially difficult to assemble but increasingly immersive and propulsive once its connections became clearer. The Millions criticized the descriptive opening and self-conscious prose, finding the novel more effective after its narratives converged but regarding the kidnapping plot and conclusion as contrived. The New Statesman similarly judged Gibson's ideas and observations more compelling than the characterization, settings, plot, or ending.

Milgrim received the most consistent praise among the returning characters. Library Journal regarded him as the novel's standout figure, emphasizing his movement toward self-discovery and greater connection with other people. The review also praised Hollis as sympathetic, competent, and conflicted, and considered Zero History one of Gibson's strongest novels since the cyberpunk fiction that established his reputation. io9 likewise praised Milgrim's recovery and emerging ability to understand specialized cultures, calling the book an entertaining and bittersweet conclusion to the trilogy. Critics differed, however, over how readily the novel could be approached without the preceding volumes. Both reviews considered it understandable on its own, although io9 found it more rewarding after Pattern Recognition and Spook Country. INDY Week, by contrast, warned that the returning characters and accumulated history could present difficulties for readers new to the sequence.

Later assessments considered Zero History more explicitly as the culmination of the Blue Ant sequence. One scholarly study regarded it as a strong third volume and the most accomplished expression of Gibson's model of a hidden contemporary history. It praised Milgrim's increasing independence but found Hollis comparatively superficial, and interpreted Bigend's role as completing his transformation from an ambiguous patron into an antagonist driven by commercial and political power. The novel was also included in a retrospective survey of 101 English-language science-fiction novels published between 1985 and 2010, which treated it as science fiction of the recognizable present and emphasized its caper and espionage structure, Milgrim's missing history, and its position as the conclusion of the sequence. A later New Yorker assessment placed the trilogy within Gibson's movement away from imagined futures toward fiction about global capitalism and militarism, finding its clipped prose well suited to an atmosphere of paranoia and sterile greed.

Zero History was a finalist for the 2011 John W. Campbell Memorial Award and placed fifth in the science-fiction novel category of the 2011 Locus Awards reader poll, behind Blackout/All Clear by Connie Willis, Cryoburn by Lois McMaster Bujold, The Dervish House by Ian McDonald, and Surface Detail by Iain M. Banks.
