= Coolhunting =

Trend predictions in business

Coolhunting is a form of marketing where professionals make observations and predictions based on changes of new or existing "cool" cultural fads and trends. Coolhunting is also referred to as "trend spotting", and is a subset of trend analysis. The term was coined in the early 1990s.

Coolhunters resemble the intuitive fashion magazine editors of the 1960s such as Nancy White (Harper's Bazaar 1958–1971). Coolhunters operate mostly in the world of street fashion and design, but their work also blurs into that of futurists such as Faith Popcorn.

== Business model ==
A coolhunting firm is a marketing agency whose exclusive purpose is to conduct research of the youth demographic. They then compile their data and produce reports detailing emerging and declining trends in youth culture as well as predictions for future trends. These reports are then sold to various companies whose products target the youth demographic. They also offer consulting services. Coolhunting firms often provide services for some of the largest corporations in the world.

Rather than outsourcing their market research, some companies opt for in-house youth culture marketing divisions. These divisions act in much the same way as a coolhunting firm but the reports and data collected remain within the company and are used solely to promote its products. A company will often prefer this form of coolhunting as a way to gain an advantage in the valuable youth market since the research conducted by coolhunting firms is available to anyone willing to pay for it. Viacom's MTV television network employs in-house coolhunting.

== Methods and practices ==
Coolhunting is more than simple market research because of the nature of the subjects. The teen and preteen market is often referred to as a "stubborn" demographic in that they do not respond as well to blatant advertising and marketing campaigns targeted at them. Coolhunters therefore must be more stealthy in their methods of gathering information and data.

Focus groups, though quite obvious in their attempts at gathering information, are very popular among coolhunters as they provide direct insight into the thoughts and feelings of their target demographic. Coolhunters will typically gather a group of randomly selected individuals from their target demographic. While one or more market researchers interact with the group, they are often being monitored and recorded by a non-visible group, because not only do coolhunters want to hear what their subjects have to say, they also want to observe their simple mannerisms.

Depending on the nature of the study, the methods of the information-gathering during a focus group interview may be extremely broad, with questions relating to lifestyle and youth culture, or more specific, like comparing certain brands and determining which brands the group is most responsive to.

Participants in focus groups are usually rewarded for their participation, whether it be a cash amount, free products, or other rewards.

Coolhunters will often seek out individuals from within their target demographic who are regarded as leaders or trendsetters. They will then hire these individuals to be Cool Narcs, who gather information secretly among their peers and report their findings back to their employers. This is a popular method of coolhunting as it provides insight into their target demographic within their natural environment.

There are a wide variety of methods for conducting market research online. Popular examples are online surveys where upon completion, the participant will usually receive a prize or monetary compensation. Other times coolhunters will enter chatrooms and webgroups posing as an individual within the target demographic and gather information.

== See also ==
- Consumerism
- Influencer marketing
- Popular culture
- WGSN
