= Grupo Simpa =

Argentine business group

Grupo Simpa S.A.
- Type: Sociedad anónima
- Industry: Petrochemical distribution, motorcycles, machinery and power tools, real estate
- Headquarters: Martínez, San Isidro Partido, Argentina
- Area served: Argentina, Mexico, Peru, Brazil
- Key people: Martín Schwartz (Chief executive officer)
- Brands: Gamma
- Number of employees: 350 direct (2022)
- Website: simpa.com.ar

Grupo Simpa is an Argentine family-owned business group with divisions in plastics, motorcycles, tools and real estate. Grupo Simpa distributes plastic raw materials, makes machinery and power tools under its own Gamma brand, and assembles motorcycles, all-terrain vehicles and utility vehicles for international brands at its plant in the Pilar Industrial Park, Buenos Aires Province. Its commercial offices are in Martínez, San Isidro Partido. The group operates in Argentina, Mexico, Peru and Brazil.

== History ==
=== Origins and plastics ===
The name Simpa stands for Sociedad Importadora de Materias Primas Americanas (American Raw Materials Import Company), a firm that imported plastic inputs from the United States.

Mony Schwartz, a Romanian Jewish immigrant, arrived in Montevideo, Uruguay, at the age of 13, at the start of the Second World War. He sold Coca-Cola on the city's beaches before moving to Buenos Aires, where he later opened a plastics workshop that made toys, mainly dolls. In the 1970s Simpa was one of its raw-material suppliers, and after the owner died in an accident Schwartz bought the company from his widow.

=== Gamma ===
Gamma was launched in the 1990s with profits from the plastics business, after the board decided to turn the machines and tools developed for one of the group's production lines into a brand of its own. In 2017 Gamma sold 27 product lines, including pressure washers, generators, water pumps and compressors, and had 200 employees. Welders, generators and vacuum cleaners for Gamma are made at the Pilar plant. Gamma also operates in Brazil.

=== Motorcycles ===
The motorcycle business grew out of the tools division. One of Mony Schwartz's sons imported Bombardier boats, and the group began selling small Bombardier all-terrain vehicles through Gamma's sales force and in supermarkets, under a first contract for ten units a year. In 2010 Bombardier asked Grupo Simpa to open an exclusive Can-Am dealership to keep the distribution. The dealership, opened with a partner from Tucumán, tripled sales in its first year.

In 2013 Grupo Simpa bought the Argentine distribution of KTM from Altavista, a Mexican importer. A few months later it started assembling the KTM 200 Duke at a 10,000 m^{2} plant in Campana. After the 2016 motorcycle law set local-content requirements, the plant added the KTM 390 and RC 200 and a second line for CFMoto all-terrain vehicles. In February 2019 Grupo Simpa bought the Argentine distribution of Piaggio, Vespa, Aprilia and Moto Guzzi from Grupo Car One.

Grupo Simpa has been the Argentine distributor of Royal Enfield since the Indian brand entered the country in 2018. In September 2020 it began assembling the Himalayan, the Interceptor 650 and the Continental GT 650 at its Campana facilities for the Latin American market. Also in 2020, Grupo Simpa's subsidiary Moto Continental began operating in Mexico.

Production of the KTM 790 Adventure started in Campana in February 2021, with an investment of 200 million pesos and 20 new jobs. KTM's local manager said it would be the largest-displacement motorcycle ever produced in Argentina. The Husqvarna TE 300i followed in November 2021.

=== Pilar plant ===
Axel Kicillof, governor of Buenos Aires Province, attended the opening of the Pilar plant on 12 May 2022. By then Grupo Simpa was exporting to Uruguay and Paraguay. The plant cost more than US$35 million and has 35,000 m^{2} of covered space on a 125,000 m^{2} site, with five production lines for motorcycles, ATVs, utility vehicles and Gamma machines.

In November 2022 the group took over the Argentine distribution of Harley-Davidson, present in the country since 1994, which brought its portfolio to 13 international brands. A month later it launched the Italian brand Moto Morini, assembled in Pilar. In 2023 Grupo Simpa represented 14 brands, including Husqvarna and GasGas, which it took on after both were acquired by KTM's owner. It registered about 20,000 motorcycles a year, around 5% of the Argentine market, with a focus on the premium segment. Its average local content was 15%, against a legal minimum of 9%. QJMotor, a Chinese brand owned by Geely, was added in June 2024.

Grupo Simpa closed the Campana plant in September 2025. In December 2025 the Pilar plant was assembling more than ten KTM models, the full Royal Enfield and QJMotor ranges, and some Aprilia and Moto Morini models. Moto Continental started operations in Peru in 2025. By 2026 Mexico had become the group's second-largest market after Argentina, and the Pilar plant had been authorized to operate a bonded customs warehouse.

=== Nissan distribution ===
In April 2026 Nissan Argentina confirmed a memorandum of understanding with Grupo Simpa and Grupo Tagle, a car dealership group from Córdoba, for the sale of its local operations. Nissan signed definitive agreements on 7 October 2026, subject to conditions precedent. Under the agreements, a consortium owned 80% by Grupo Simpa and 20% by Grupo Tagle takes over the distribution of Nissan vehicles, parts and accessories in Argentina, together with the Nissan Plan de Ahorro savings scheme, with the formal handover set for 1 December 2026. Nissan Argentina ceases to be a direct subsidiary and becomes an importer within the Nissan Importers Business Unit (NIBU), which manages more than 30 Latin American markets served by independent distributors. Eight in ten Nissan Argentina employees move to the new importer, and the network of 21 dealers with 65 sales and service points remains in place. Grupo Simpa created a dedicated division for the business, with a five-year plan to raise Nissan's share of the Argentine market from 2.4% to at least 3%.

== Organization ==
Grupo Simpa has four divisions: plastics, motorcycles, tools and real estate. Its plant is at Av. Frondizi 2550 in the Pilar Industrial Park, and its logistics and production center is in the Garín Industrial Park. In 2026 the motorcycle division represented 16 international brands and assembled six of them in Pilar. Its regional director, Martín Schwartz, belongs to the third generation of the Schwartz family. In 2022 Grupo Simpa had about 350 direct employees and 1,200 indirect ones.
