= Enfield Bullet =

Enfield Bullet may refer to:

- Royal Enfield Bullet motorcycle
- Enfield rifle ammunition
