= Royal Enfield Guerrilla 450 =

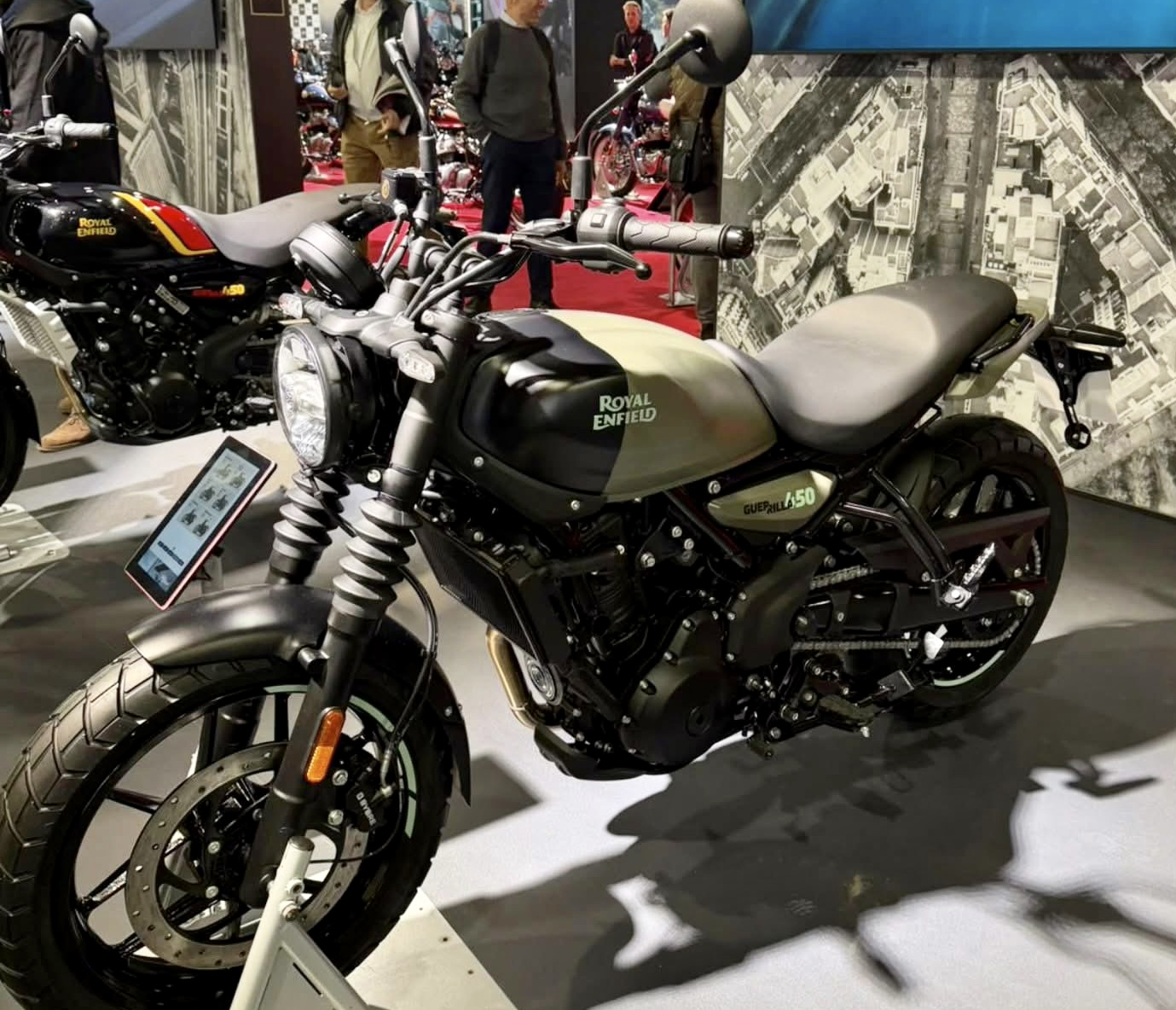
- Manufacturer: Royal Enfield
- Production: 2024–present
- Assembly: Chennai, India
- Class: Roadster
- Engine: 452cc liquid-cooled, single-cylinder
- Top speed: 170 km/h
- Power: 40 bhp @ 8,000 rpm
- Torque: 40 Nm @ 5,500 rpm
- Transmission: 6-speed gearbox
- Frame type: Steel tube frame
- Suspension: Telescopic forks (front), Monoshock (rear)
- Brakes: Disc brakes with dual-channel ABS
- Tires: Tubeless, 17-inch wheels
- Fuel capacity: 11 liters
- Related: Royal Enfield Himalayan 450

The Royal Enfield Guerrilla 450 is a Standard motorcycle launched by Royal Enfield in 2024. It is designed as a modern interpretation of classic roadster styling, offering a balance between performance and comfort. It is a roadster version of the Himalayan 450 with a top speed of 170 kph.

== Overview ==
The Royal Enfield Guerrilla 450 is designed as a modern interpretation of classic roadster styling, offering a balance between performance and comfort. The Guerrilla 450 features a 452cc liquid-cooled, single-cylinder engine that produces 40 bhp at 8,000 rpm and 40 Nm of torque at 5,500 rpm. The motorcycle comes equipped with a 6-speed gearbox, making it suitable for both city commuting and long highway rides.

== Design and features ==
The design of the Guerrilla 450 retains the retro aesthetics that Royal Enfield is known for, while integrating modern elements such as:

- Round headlamps and C-shaped LED DRLs
- A muscular fuel tank with a capacity of 11 liters
- 17-inch wheels with tubeless tires (120/70 front, 160/60 rear)
- Dual-channel ABS and riding modes (Eco and Performance) across all variants

Higher variants of the Guerrilla 450, including the Dash and Flash, offer additional features such as a 4-inch TFT display with smartphone connectivity and Google Maps navigation. The base Analogue variant features a semi-digital instrument cluster without smartphone integration.

== Performance ==
The motorcycle delivers strong mid-range torque, offering versatility for both urban and highway settings. The 452cc engine allows the bike to reach an estimated top speed of 150 km/h, with a fuel economy of approximately 29.5 km/l. Its suspension system includes telescopic forks at the front and a monoshock at the rear, ensuring a comfortable ride on various terrains.

== Variants ==
The Royal Enfield Guerrilla 450 is available in three distinct variants:

- Analogue: ₹2.39 lakh (ex-showroom), featuring basic instrumentation and minimal tech integration.
- Dash: ₹2.49 lakh (ex-showroom), offering additional tech features such as the TFT display.
- Flash: ₹2.54 lakh (ex-showroom), the top-end variant with premium finishes and advanced tech options.

Each variant is available in multiple colour options, including Smoke Silver, Playa Black, and Brava Blue.

== Reception ==
The Guerrilla 450 has been well received by motorcycle enthusiasts for its blend of classic styling and modern technology. The model is positioned competitively in the sub-400cc market, rivaling models such as the KTM Duke 390 and the Triumph Speed 400.

== See also ==
- Royal Enfield Himalayan
- Dominar 400
- KTM Duke 390
- Triumph Speed 400
