= Royal Enfield Classic =

Motorcycle model

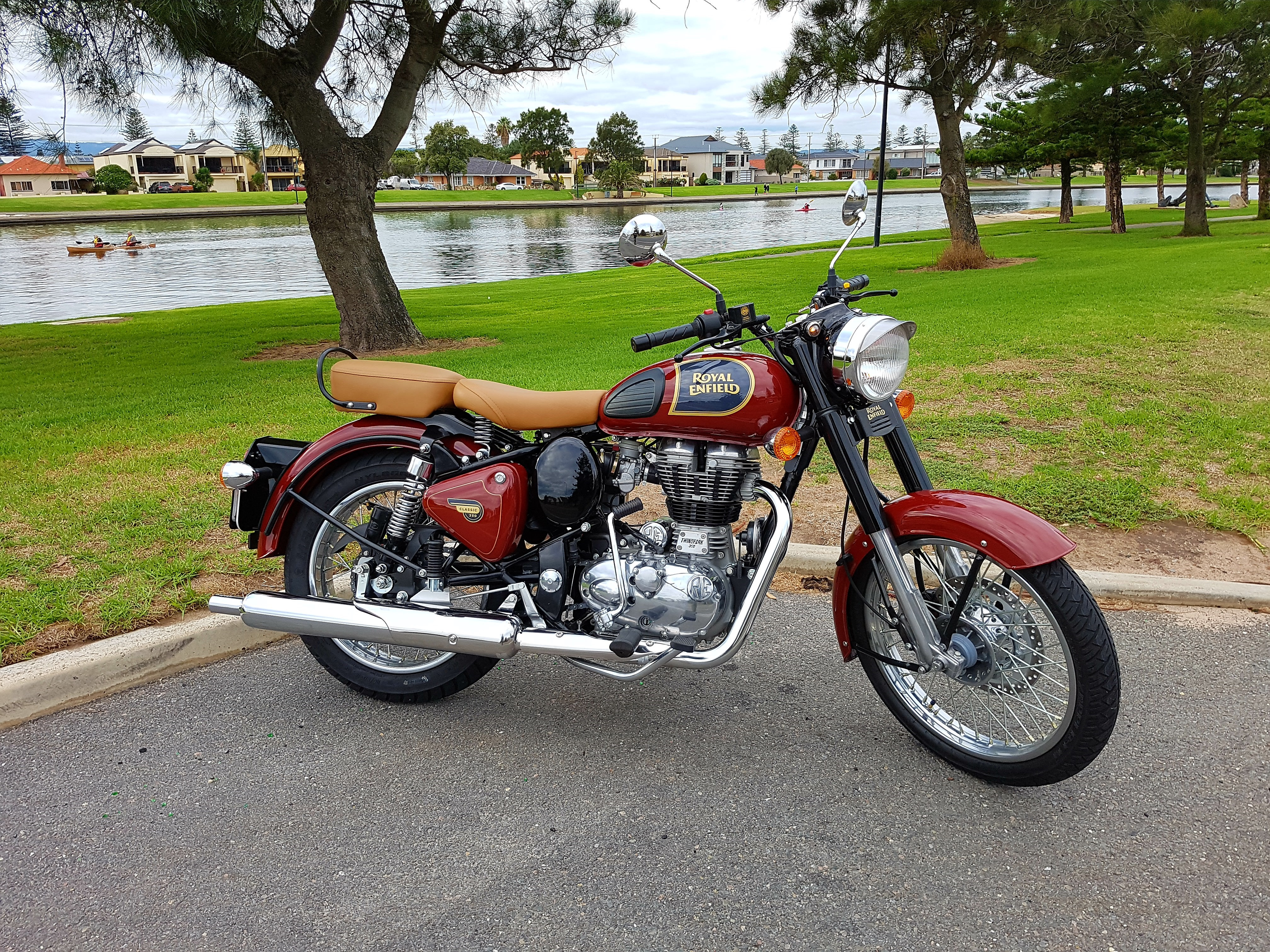
- Classic 350 in 2017
- Manufacturer: Royal Enfield
- Parent company: Eicher Motors
- Production: 2009-present
- Predecessor: Royal Enfield Machismo
- Class: Retro Cruiser
- Engine: 350cc (carbureted)/ 500cc (EFI) single cylinder UCE, OHV, digital dual spark ignition system (12 volt)
- Transmission: 5-speed integrated gearbox (gear shifter on the left side)

The Royal Enfield Classic models are Royal Enfield motorcycles that have been in Production since 2009. The Classic series of Royal Enfield motorcycles are inspired by the Royal Enfield G2 350cc Bullet motorcycle, first produced in 1948.

== First Generation Classic Series (2009–2021) ==
The first generation Classic 350 and the Classic 500 feature the new unit construction engine in their 350cc and 500cc variants respectively. However the Classic 350 uses a carburettor for fuel delivery and the Classic 500 has EFI. The Classic 350 has an ammeter while the Classic 500 has a low fuel indicator light and engine check light instead of the ammeter. The ammeter on the Classic 350 is more of a vestigial remain as the modern Classic 350 has no practical use for it. In the older models with CB points, when the piston was in the top dead centre (CB points closed) then the ammeter would stay in the middle. This feature allowed the rider to use the decompression lever to move the piston to top dead center and kick starter with relative ease. Both of these models are more expensive and targeted at a market segment above the Royal Enfield Bullet 350 and the Bullet 500.

Both the Classic 350 and the Classic 500 come in a variety of color options, including; Stealth Black, Chrome, Battle Green, and Gunmetal Grey.

In 2017 Royal Enfield equipped Classic 500 models with Euro 4 compliance which included ABS brakes for front and rear and better emission control system.

In 2018 Royal Enfield released Classic 350 models with ABS in some markets. In 2019 classic 500 production is stopped and company launches new bs6 engines and dual channel abs

A final "end of build" production run of 1000 units is launched, Classic 500 Tribute Black.

First Generation Royal Enfield Classic 350 specification:

Engine

- Type single cylinder, 4 stroke, twinspark, aircooled
- Displacement 346cc
- Bore × stroke 70 mm × 90 mm
- Compression ratio 8.5 : 1
- Maximum power 19.1 bhp @ 5250 rpm
- Maximum torque 28 Nm @ 4000 rpm
- Ignition system transistorised coil ignition
- Clutch wet, multi-plate
- Gearbox 5 speed constant mesh
- Lubrication wet sump
- Engine oil 15 W 50 API, SL grade & above, JASO MA 2
- Fuel supply UCAL 29 mm Constant vacuum carburettor / electronic fuel injection (duel channel model)
- Air cleaner paper element
- Engine start electric/kick

Chassis & suspension

- Type single downtube, using engine as stressed member
- Front suspension telescopic, 35 mm forks, 130 mm travel
- Rear suspension twin gas charged shock absorbers with 5-step adjustable preload, 80 mm travel

Dimensions

- Wheelbase 1370 mm
- Ground clearance 135 mm
- Length 2160 mm
- Width 790 mm (without mirrors)
- Height 1090 mm (without mirrors)
- Seat height
- Kerb weight 195 kg (with 90% Fuel & Oil)
- Fuel capacity 13.5 L

Brakes & tyres

- Tyres Fr. 90/90 - 19
- Tyres Rr. 110/90 - 18
- Brakes front 280mm disc, 2-piston caliper
- Brakes rear disc, 1-piston caliper
- Dual Channel ABS.

Electricals

- Electrical system 12 volt - DC
- Battery 12 volt, 8 Ah
- Head lamp 12V, H4-60/55W (halogen)
- Tail lamp 12V, P21/5W
- Turn signal lamp 12V, R10W X 4nos

First Generation Royal Enfield Classic 500 specification:

Engine

- Type single cylinder, 4 stroke, spark ignition, air cooled, fuel injection
- Displacement 499cc
- Bore × stroke 84 mm × 90 mm
- Compression ratio 8.5 : 1
- Maximum power 27.2 bhp @ 5250 rpm
- Maximum torque 41.3 Nm @ 4000 rpm
- Ignition system digital electronic ignition
- Clutch wet, multi-plate
- Gearbox 5 speed constant mesh
- Lubrication wet sump
- Engine oil 15 W 50 API, SL grade & above, JASO MA 2
- Fuel supply electronic fuel injection
- Air cleaner paper element
- Engine start electric/kick

Chassis & suspension

- Type single downtube, using engine as stressed member
- Front suspension telescopic, 35 mm forks, 130 mm travel
- Rear suspension twin gas charged shock absorbers with 5-step adjustable preload, 80 mm travel

Dimensions

- Wheelbase 1360 mm
- Ground clearance 135 mm
- Length 2140 mm
- Width 790 mm (without mirrors)
- Height 1090 mm (without mirrors)
- Seat height
- Kerb weight 194 kg (with 90% fuel & oil)
- Fuel capacity 13.5 L

Brakes & tyres

- Tyres Fr. 90/90 - 19
- Tyres Rr. 120/80 - 18
- Brakes front 280mm disc, 2-piston caliper
- Brakes rear 153mm drum, single lead internal expanding

Electricals

- Electrical system 12 volt - DC
- Battery 12 volt, 14 Ah
- Head lamp 12V, 60 W / 55 W, halogen
- Tail lamp 12V, P21/5W
- Turn signal Lamp 12V, R10W X 4nos

Best selling model

- Gunmetal Grey

== Second Generation Classic Series (2022-) ==
Eschewing the 500cc variant, the second generation Classic launched in late 2021 (for the 2022 model year) as the Classic 350 Reborn.

This model is a complete redesign, with a new engine, new chassis, new suspension, and new brakes, along with a much wider variety of cosmetics, accessories, and paint schemes.

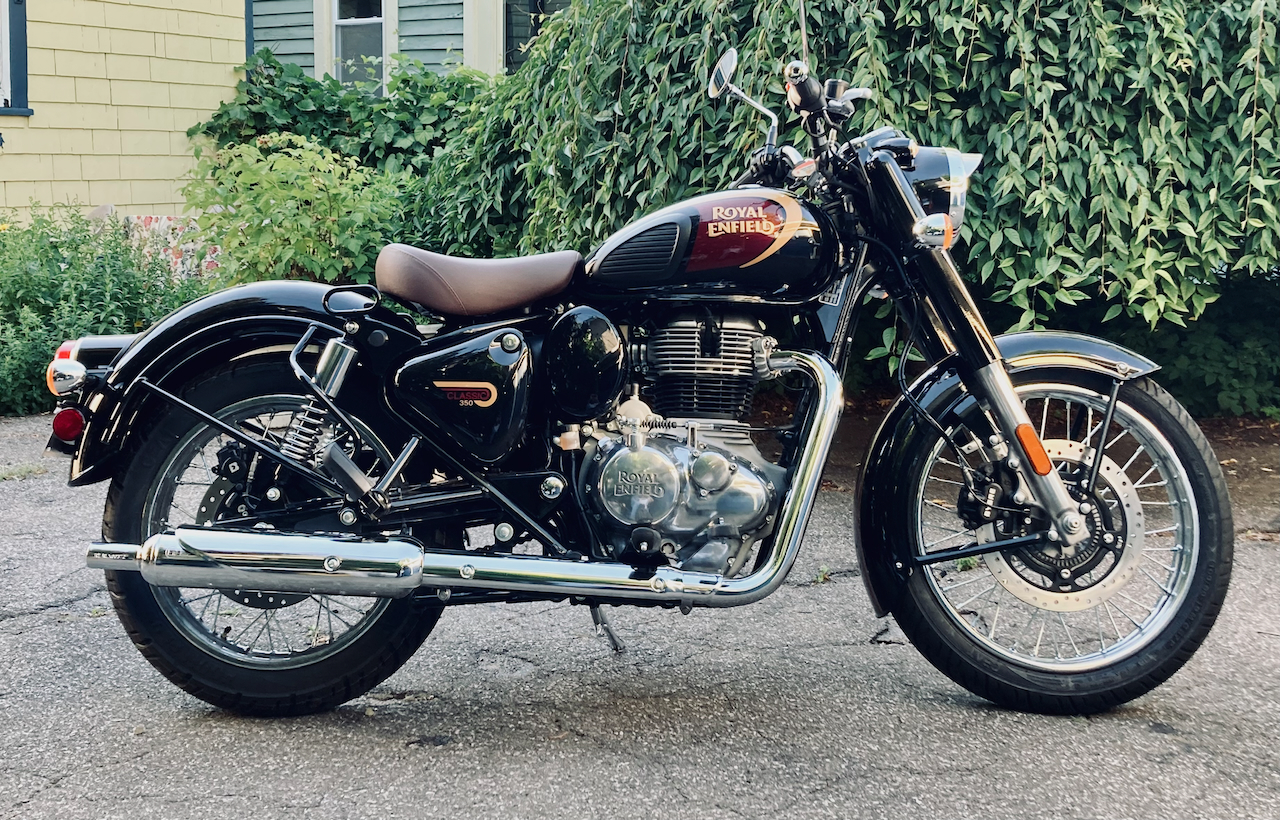
2022 Royal Enfield "Classic 350 Reborn," in Halcyon Black.

In 2022, it starts at an ex-showroom price of ₹1.84 lakh (US$1,900) in India. In Germany, it starts at €4,890 (US$5,783.4).

In 2024, Royal Enfield launched the retro-styled Bobber version of Classic 350, the Goan Classic 350, with the same 349cc air-cooled SOHC Single cylinder engine.

=== Reception ===
The global motorcycle press reviews for the redesigned Classic 350 have been favorable at launch. Critics acknowledge riding the motorcycle is "a languid, unhurried experience" as it was not designed for speed. However, the handling, fuel economy, ergonomics, low-price, quality, and beauty of the motorcycle suggest it was "designed to be fun and friendly to a wide range of riders."

=== Second Generation Classic 350 Claimed Specifications ===
MSRP (excl. taxes):	$4,499–$4,699
Engine:	349cc, SOHC, air/oil-cooled single
Bore x Stroke:	72.0 x 85.8mm
Transmission/Final Drive:	5-speed/chain
Claimed Horsepower:	20.2 hp @ 6,100 rpm
Claimed Torque:	19 lb.-ft. @ 4,000 rpm
Fuel Delivery:	Electronic fuel injection w/ 32mm throttle body
Clutch:	Wet, multiple disc; cable operation
Engine Management/Ignition:	Electronic
Frame:	Twin-downtube spine steel
Front Suspension:	41mm telescopic fork; 5.1 in. travel
Rear Suspension:	Twin-tube emulsion shock absorbers, preload adjustable
Front Brake:	ByBre 2-piston floating caliper, 300mm disc w/ ABS
Rear Brake:	ByBre 1-piston floating caliper, 270mm disc w/ ABS
Wheels, Front/Rear:	Spoked wheels w/ alloy rims (Signals, Halcyon, Chrome) / 10-spoke alloy (Dark Stealth); 19 in./18 in.
Tires, Front/Rear:	100/90-19 / 120/80-18
Rake/Trail:	26.0°/4.4 in.
Wheelbase:	54.7 in.
Ground Clearance:	6.7 in.
Seat Height:	31.7 in.
Fuel Capacity:	3.4 gal.
Wet Weight:	430 lb.
