= Royal Enfield Continental GT =

Indian made motorcycle

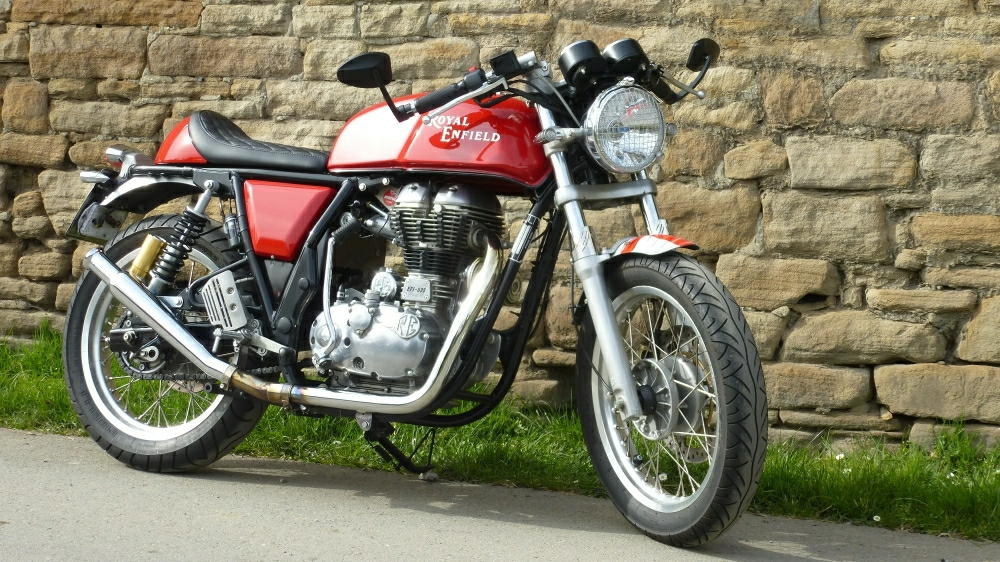
- Royal Enfield Continental GT 535
- Manufacturer: Royal Enfield
- Parent company: Eicher Motors
- Production: 2014-present
- Predecessor: GT535
- Class: Neo-retro Café Racer
- Engine: 648 cc parallel twin, 4-stroke, single overhead cam, air/oil-cooled
- Bore / stroke: 78 mm × 67.8 mm (3.07 in × 2.67 in)
- Compression ratio: 9.5:1
- Top speed: 170 km/h
- Power: 47.65 PS @ 7150 rpm
- Torque: 52 NM @ 5250 rpm
- Ignition type: Digital spark ignition - TCI
- Transmission: 6 speed transmission with slip and assist clutch
- Frame type: Tubular steel frame with bolted trussing developed in collaboration with Harris Performance
- Suspension: Suspension Front 41 mm front fork, 110 mm travel (with optional fork gators) Suspension Rear Twin coil-over shocks, 88 mm travel
- Wheelbase: 1400 mm
- Dimensions: L: 2122 mm W: 1165 mm H: 789 mm
- Seat height: 804mm
- Weight: 198 KG (dry); 202 KG (wet)
- Fuel capacity: 12.5 L
- Range: 22-25 km/L
- Ground clearance: 174MM

The Royal Enfield Continental GT 650 is a Neo-retro Café Racer motorcycle produced by Royal Enfield. The first model to use the name, the Continental GT 250, was produced by the original Royal Enfield in the 1960s UK. The name was revived by the Indian manufacturer in the 2010s with the Continental GT 535 (now discontinued) and Continental GT 650.

== Continental GT 250 ==
=== Discontinued ===
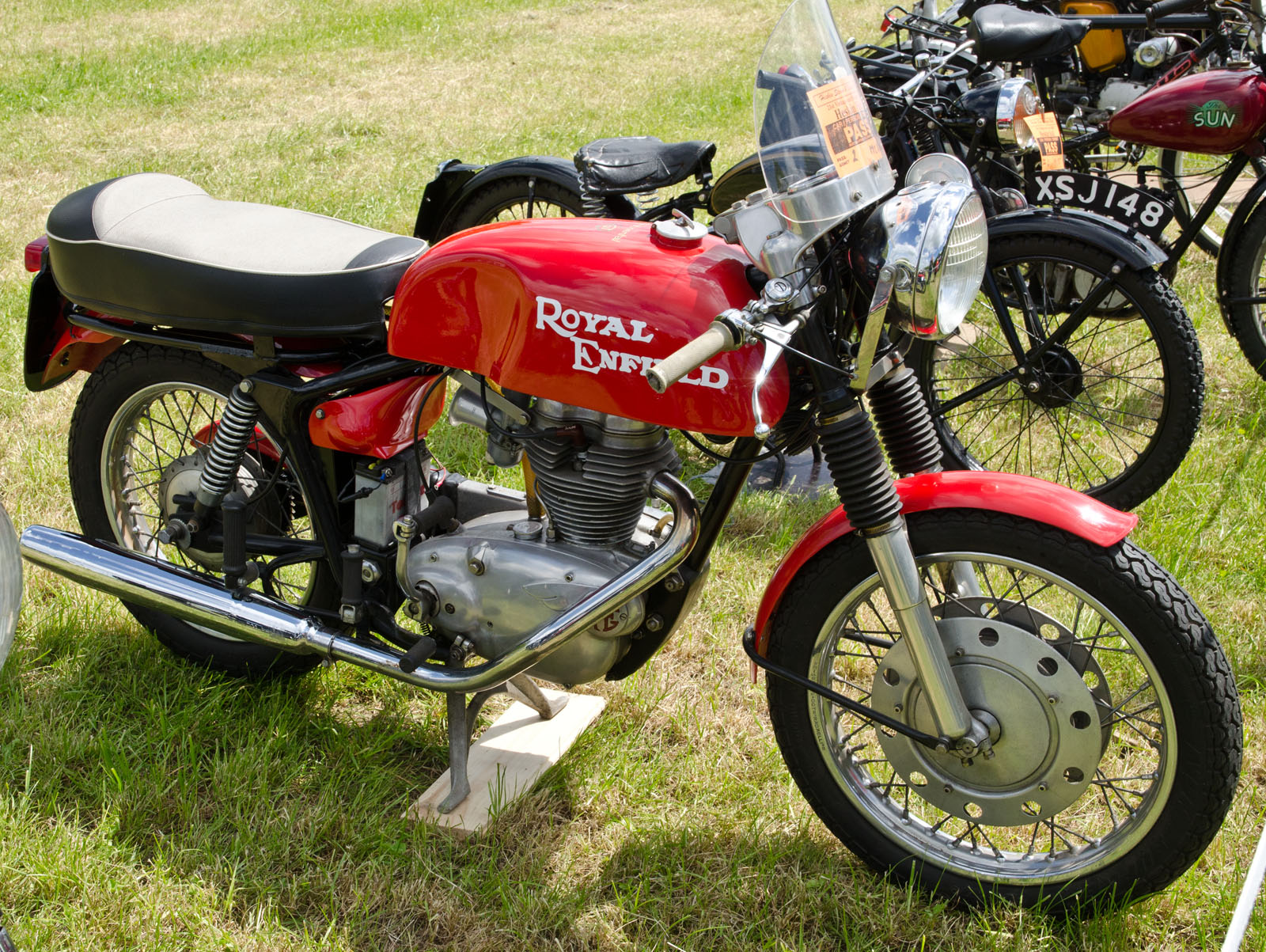
Continental GT 250

Royal Enfield (the original UK company) developed a new machine for the 1965 market, the 250 cc "Continental GT" based on existing mechanicals. Prior to the 1964 Earls Court UK national motorcycle exhibition in November, the factory arranged a long-distance run to demonstrate the reliability of the machine from John o' Groats in the north of Scotland to Land's End in Cornwall. With five road riders, pre-arranged fuel stops and factory mechanical back up, the route was covered in 22 hours 20 minutes. A sixth rider was John Cooper, a road-racer who completed 8 laps of the Silverstone Grand Prix layout at race speeds.

== Continental GT 535 ==
=== Discontinued ===
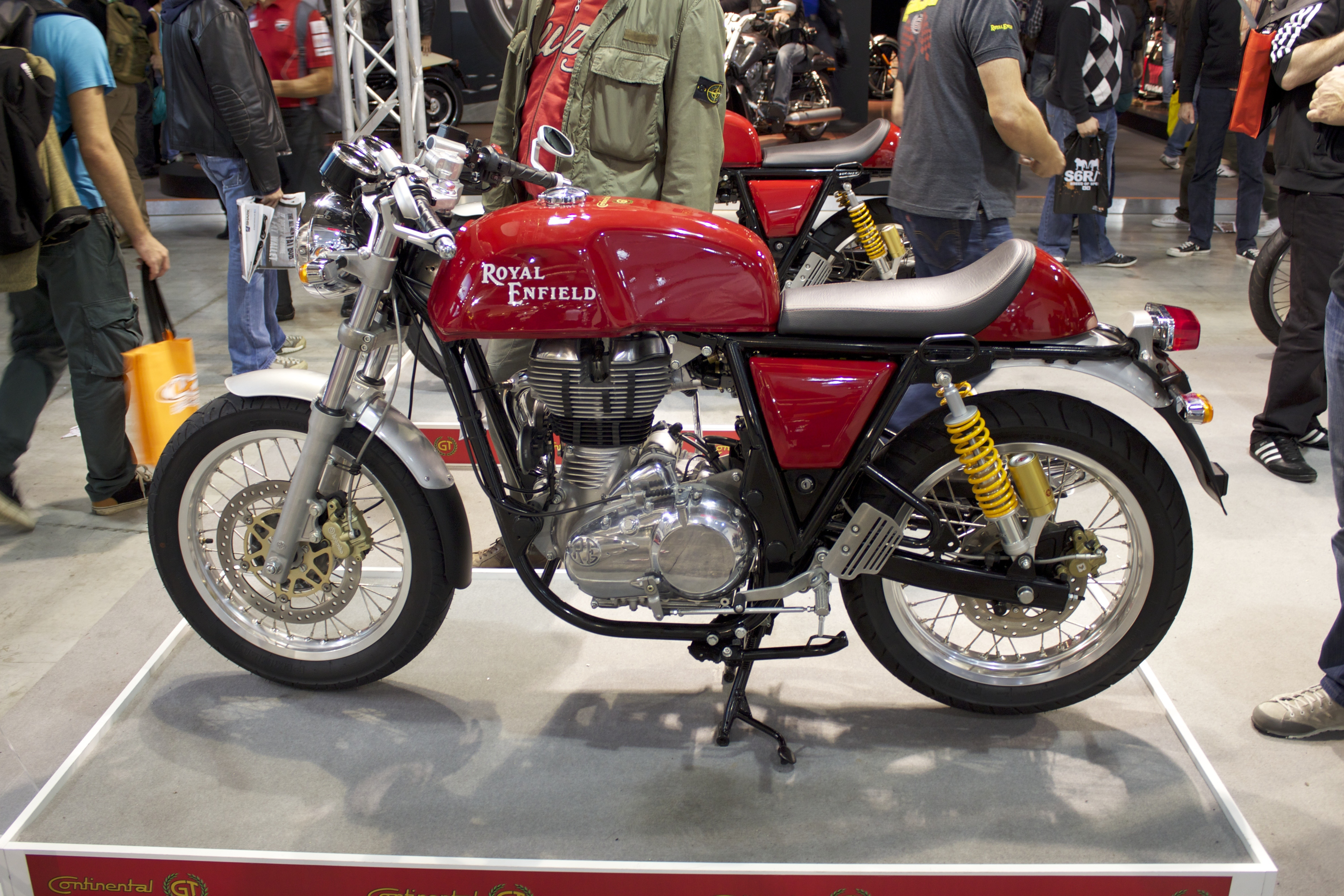
Continental GT 535

The Continental GT was the most powerful machine from Royal Enfield when it was launched in 2014 and is reminiscent of the café racers of the 1960s, including the Enfield model from 1966. It was equipped with a 535 cm^{3} single-cylinder engine that develops almost 21 kW (30 hp) at 5100 rpm. The John o'Groats to Land's End route was also used with this model, and the construction again proved its reliability.

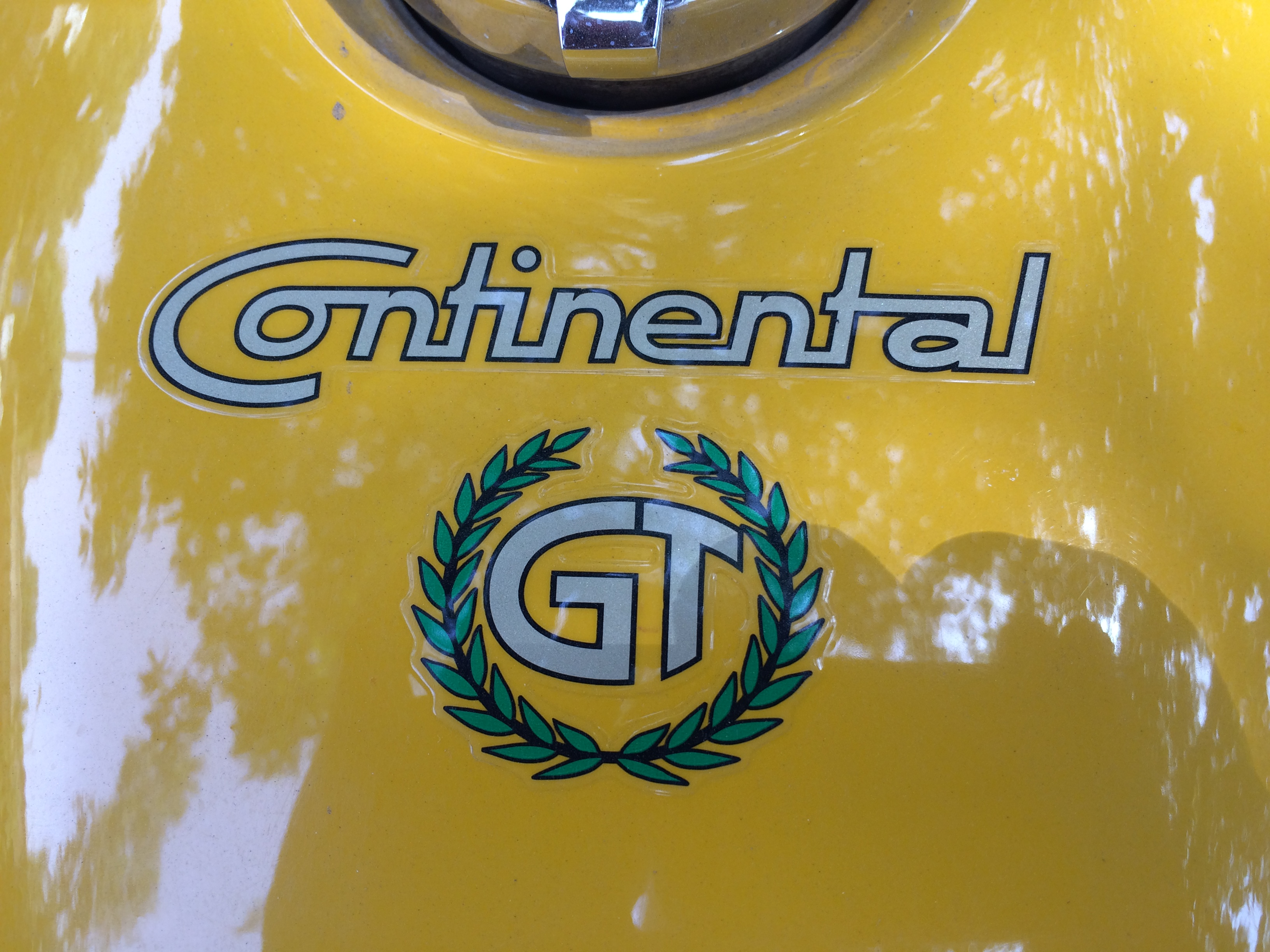

The Continental engine is a block engine - the crankshaft and gearbox are combined in one housing - and has intake manifold injection; The alternator is on the right of the crankshaft, the primary drive is on the left. The emission limits EURO 3 and 4 can be complied with. It has a 90 mm stroke and 84 mm bore and achieves a maximum torque of 44.0 Nm at a speed of 4000 rpm.

== Continental GT 650 ==
=== currently in production ===
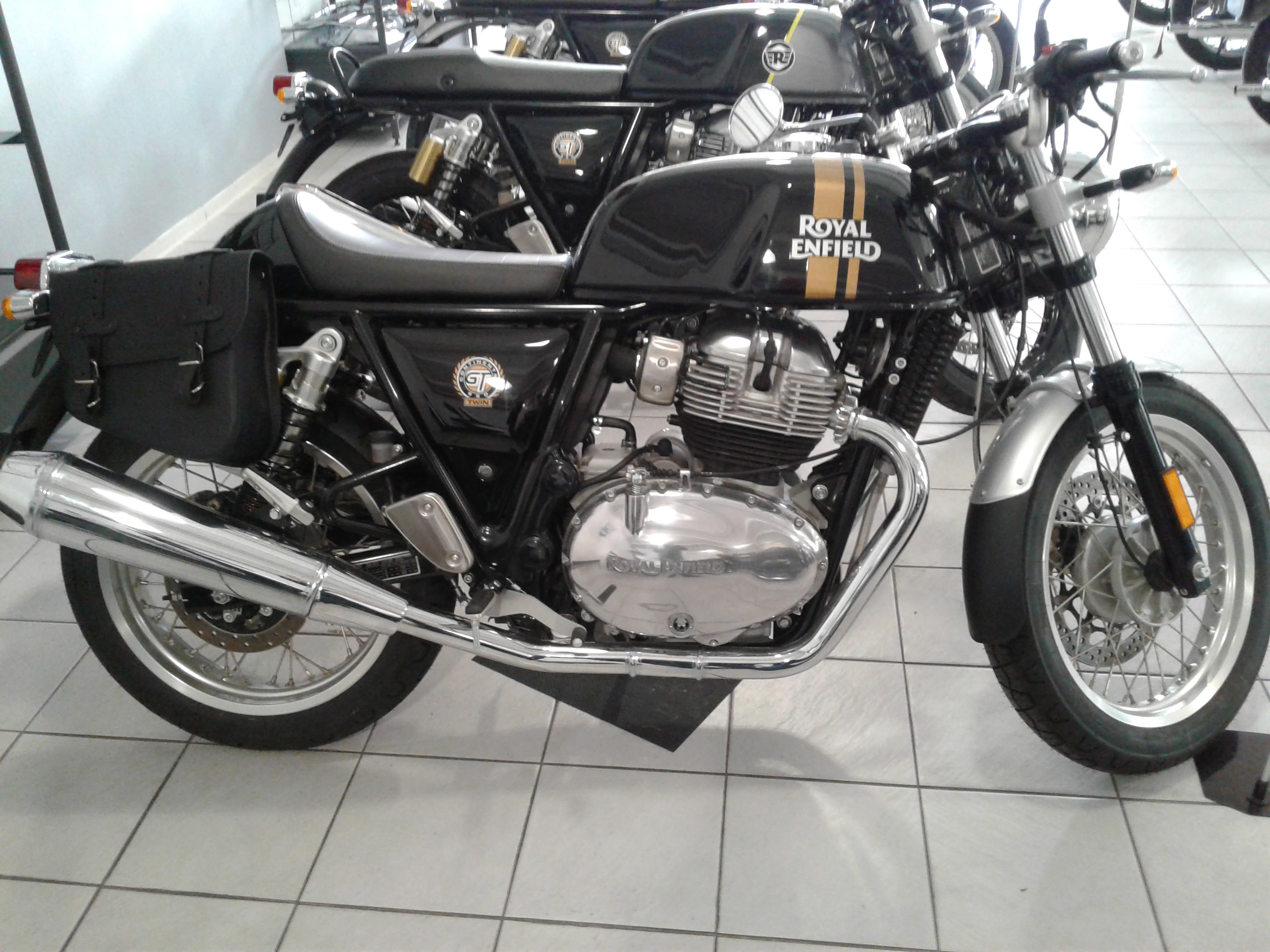
Continental GT 650

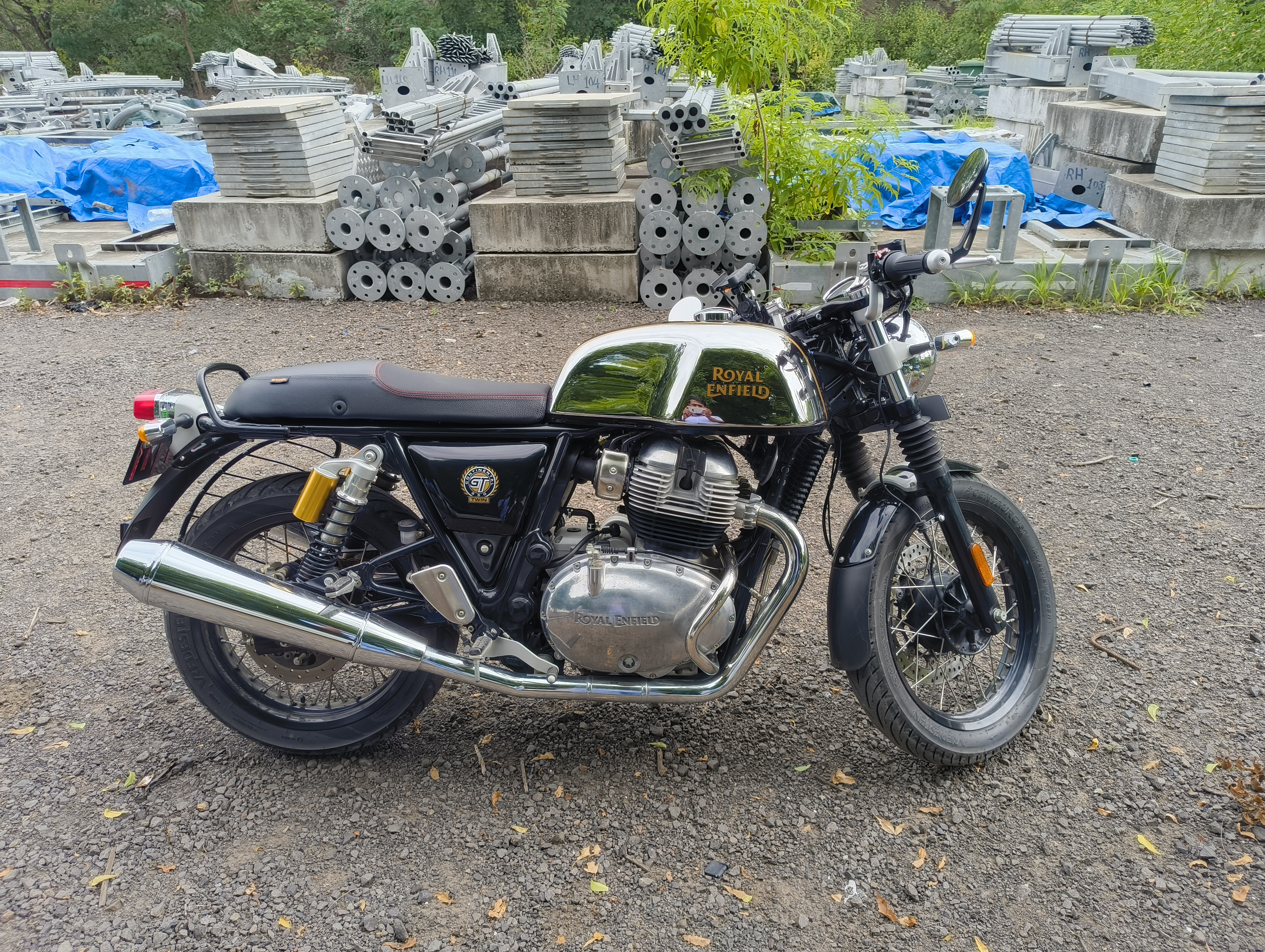
Royal Enfield Continental GT 650 Mr. Clean

The Continental GT 650 alongside the Interceptor 650 was introduced in November 2017. The café racer has either a standard dual-seat or an optional solo seat with a seat hump. The fuel tank is more angular than the roadster's. Clip-on handlebars and rear-set pegs allow a sportier riding position. The Royal Enfield Continental GT 650 is powered by a 647.95 cc, parallel-twin, air cooled and oil cooled engine.
