= Royal Enfield Himalayan =

Dual-purpose motorcycle

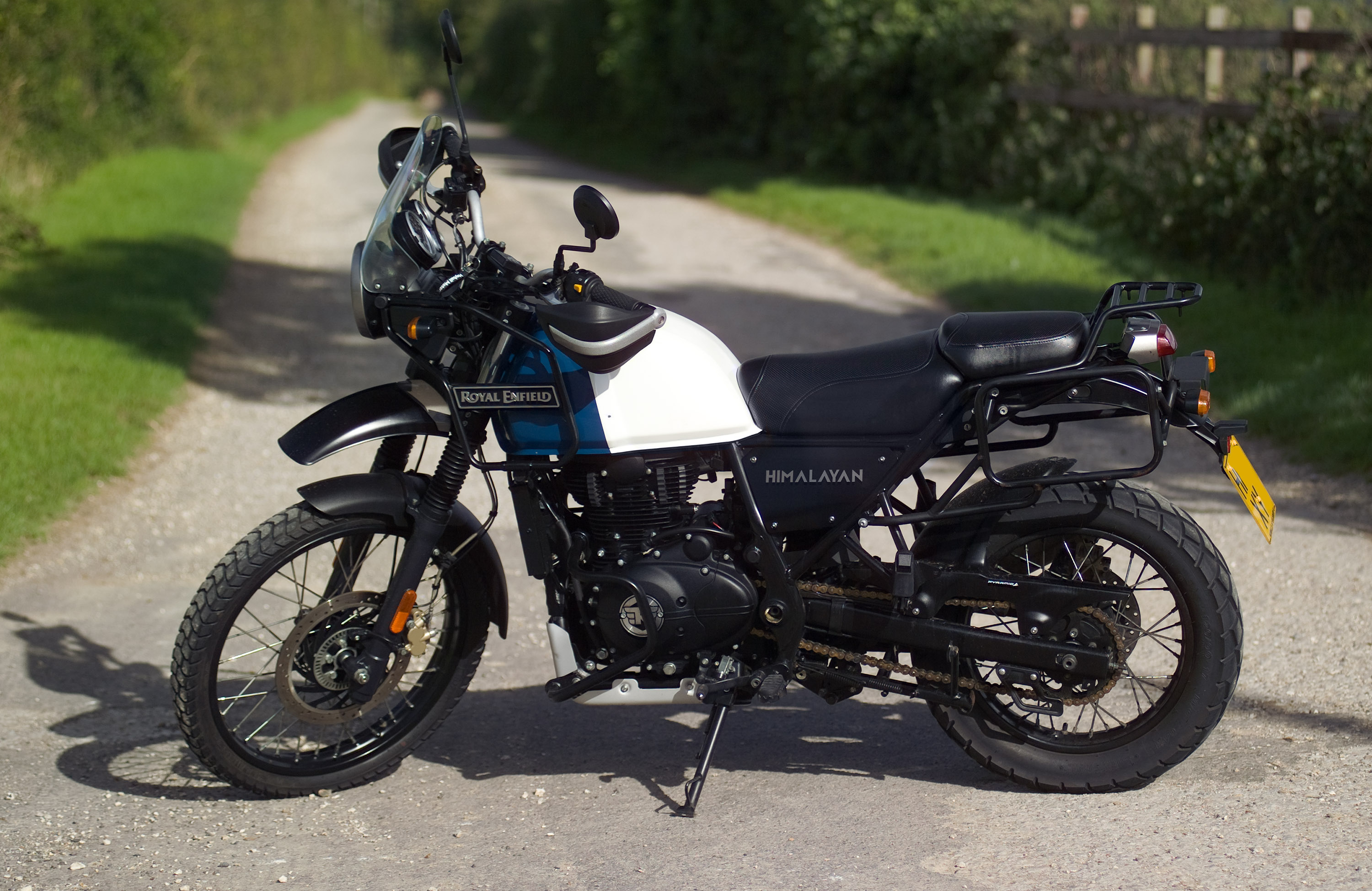
- Manufacturer: Royal Enfield
- Parent company: Eicher Motors
- Production: 2016-2023 411 cc variant. 2023 on - 452 cc variant.
- Class: dual-purpose. Small ADV bike as a broader category.
- Engine: 411 cc (25.1 cu in) LS410, Air-cooled single-cylinder 4-stroke, SOHC, Fuel Injection / 452 cc (27.6 cu in) DOHC, liquid-cooled, 4 valves
- Bore / stroke: 78 mm × 86 mm (3.1 in × 3.4 in); 84 mm × 81.5 mm (3.31 in × 3.21 in)
- Compression ratio: 9.5:1; 11.5:1 - 411 cc variant. 12.xyc 452 cc variant.
- Ignition type: electronic ignition - both variants.
- Transmission: 5 speed, manual 411 cc variant. 6 speed manual 452 cc variant.
- Frame type: Steel tube lattice - both variants.
- Suspension: Front – telescopic; rear – monoshock, both variants.
- Brakes: Front – 300 mm disc with 2-piston floating caliper; back – 240 mm disc with single piston caliper; ABS as standard
- Weight: 182 kg (dry); 200 kg (439 lbs) approx. (wet)
- Fuel capacity: ~15L or ~17L (4.5 gallons US) variant dependent.

The Himalayan Motorcycle refers to one of four Adventure Bikes (ADV) made in India by the Royal Enfield motorcycle company of Chennai, India. The brand was originally British with some manufacturing performed by what was Madras Motorcycles. The British business concern ceased operating in the 1970s, but the Madras Motorcycles adopted the Royal Enfield brand name and continued production in India, no components are currently made in Britain though it retains an R&D design unit located in Leicestershire, England. In addition, Royal Enfield retains a distinct British connection via their R&D facility and via the acquisition of Harris Performance, an established British high-performance frame design company located in Britain as of 2026.

Royal Enfield tends to use 'British Legacy' as a potent marketing tool. The majority of its product line are modernized retro offerings of older British designs from the mid-century period. The Himalayan offerings representing a somewhat more modern ADV design offering but with hints of this older design lineage.

As of the middle of 2026 Himalayans come in four variants, with engine displacements of 411, 440, 450 and 750 cc. These offerings share almost no mechanical relationship to the prior original 411 cc Himalayan offering. This atypical branding philosophy is driven largely by the nature of the company's sales region, despite 2026 sales of over one million units, its market remains largely based in India with just a small percentage of sales in the US, EU and South America. The Himalayan ADVs are small production runs representing a small fraction of the company's manufacturing base with under 40,000 units manufactured per year. RE has built a strong name brand around the concept of the 'Himalayan', engine offerings tend to be limited and are often rebored air/oil cooled engines from other RE machines.

The 450-cc offering is a distinctive product offering, as it is the only machine with a liquid cooled engine that was purpose built for this Himalayan variant/ Other Himalayans all use engines derived from other RE more retro-offerings. All Himalayans are of modest power output and range from around 20 hp to 55 hp. Himalayans are marketed as basic ADV machines but tend towards simple uncomplicated designs largely intended for the Indian market. Himalayans all tend to robust heavy chassis construction.

The original Himalayan product was revealed in February 2015 and launched in early 2016. Pierre Terblanche led the design team during Himalayan's development. As of 2025, this motorcycle has two distinct variants, the original 411 cc machine and a modernized 452 cc revamped offering. Both are branded and marketed as the 'Himalayan', but in truth the two machines share no common components but do share a similar target market.Only the 450-cc machine is currently manufactured.

== Model history ==
The original Himalayan was conceived by CEO Siddhartha Lal, as an adventure touring, or dual sport motorcycle. The Himalayan differs considerably from the other motorcycles offered by Royal Enfield, most of which are various incarnations of the Bullet utilizing the same frame and engine – in terms of its chassis and powertrain. Pierre Terblanche, formerly of Ducati and Moto Guzzi among other companies, headed Royal Enfield's design team during development of the original Himalayan.

An early prototype was made in mid-2014, followed by a more complete version in 2015. The vehicle was released in India in early 2016, followed by a release in international markets such as Philippines, Australia and the United Kingdom later that year. Electronic Fuel Injection and ABS became standard in 2017.

In late 2023, Royal Enfield launched a new variant of this product, the Himalayan 450, sometimes called the new, Himalayan. This model is equipped with a new liquid cooled 452 cc DOHC single-cylinder engine producing around 40 hp at 8000 rpm, with ~40 Nm of peak torque at 5500 rpm.

Royal Enfield Himalayan 440

The Royal Enfield Himalayan 440 is an adventure motorcycle expected to expand Royal Enfield's popular Himalayan lineup. Positioned as a practical and accessible adventure bike, it is likely to offer a balance between everyday usability, long-distance touring and off-road capability.

The motorcycle is expected to use a 443cc single-cylinder engine paired with a six-speed gearbox. While complete specifications are yet to be officially confirmed, the Himalayan 440 could feature adventure-focused styling, long-travel suspension and a larger front wheel for improved performance on rough roads.

The new model may serve as a more affordable alternative to the Himalayan 450, targeting riders who prefer a simpler and rugged adventure motorcycle. Official details regarding its price, features and complete specifications are expected to be revealed by Royal Enfield at launch.

== Description ==
=== Engine - 411 cc. Initial Himalayan variant ===
Used in the original Himalayan branded product.

The Himalayan's engine was designed and produced by Royal Enfield 'from the ground up' and shares little commonality with prior products. The engine, named the LS410 indicating its long-stroke ratio, is a unit-construction 411 cc single-cylinder, oil-cooled 4-stroke SOHC engine. The motor generates a power output of 24.5 bhp at 6,500 rpm (18.02 KW) and a maximum torque of 32 Nm at 4,000-4,500 rpm. The engine also includes an oil cooler, a first among motorcycles manufactured by Royal Enfield India. The bike employs electronic fuel injection, and the engine is mated to a 5-speed constant mesh transmission.

This engine has a single overhead camshaft, thereby moving away from the traditional pushrod design that had been used by the company from 1955, starting with the original Bullet up to the contemporary Classic series.

=== Engine - 452 cc. 2023 Himalayan variant ===
Used in the revamped 2023 updated Himalayan variant.

A modern single cylinder, water cooled engine displacing 452 cc and producing around 40 horsepower. This engine is mated to a six-speed manual gear box.

=== Frame and chassis ===
The Himalayan has a half-duplex split cradle frame. Suspension is telescopic in the front while the rear is provided with monoshock suspension. Front forks are 41 mm with 200 mm of travel and the rear suspension offers 180 mm of travel. The motorcycle has a ground clearance of 220 mm.

Factory standard tyres measure 90/90 21-inch at the front and 120/90 17-inch at the rear, as of 2025 Himalyan tyres are manufactured in India by CEAT.

The motorcycle has a 300 mm disc with a dual piston floating caliper at the front and a 240 mm single piston caliper disc at rear.

The instrumentation console for this motorcycle is also modeled anew. It includes an analog speedometer and tachometer, with a digital display for the odometer, gear position indicator, trip-meter and Ambient temperature gauge. Also included is an analog fuel gauge and a digital compass. Also included is a windscreen, which can be manually adjusted for height via screws to two positions.

The motorcycle was designed specifically with light adventure touring in mind and features an upright seating position, with a seat height of 800 mm, allowing the rider to be seated relatively low compared to the overall height of the motorcycle. The motorcycle also features mounts on either side of the fuel tank, which can serve as holders for jerrycans, as well as front fuel tank guards. The rear includes a luggage carrier, and mounts are also provided as well to install aluminum panniers both provided by Royal Enfield as accessories.
