= Royal Enfield =

Indian motorcycle manufacturing company

Royal Enfield Motors Ltd.

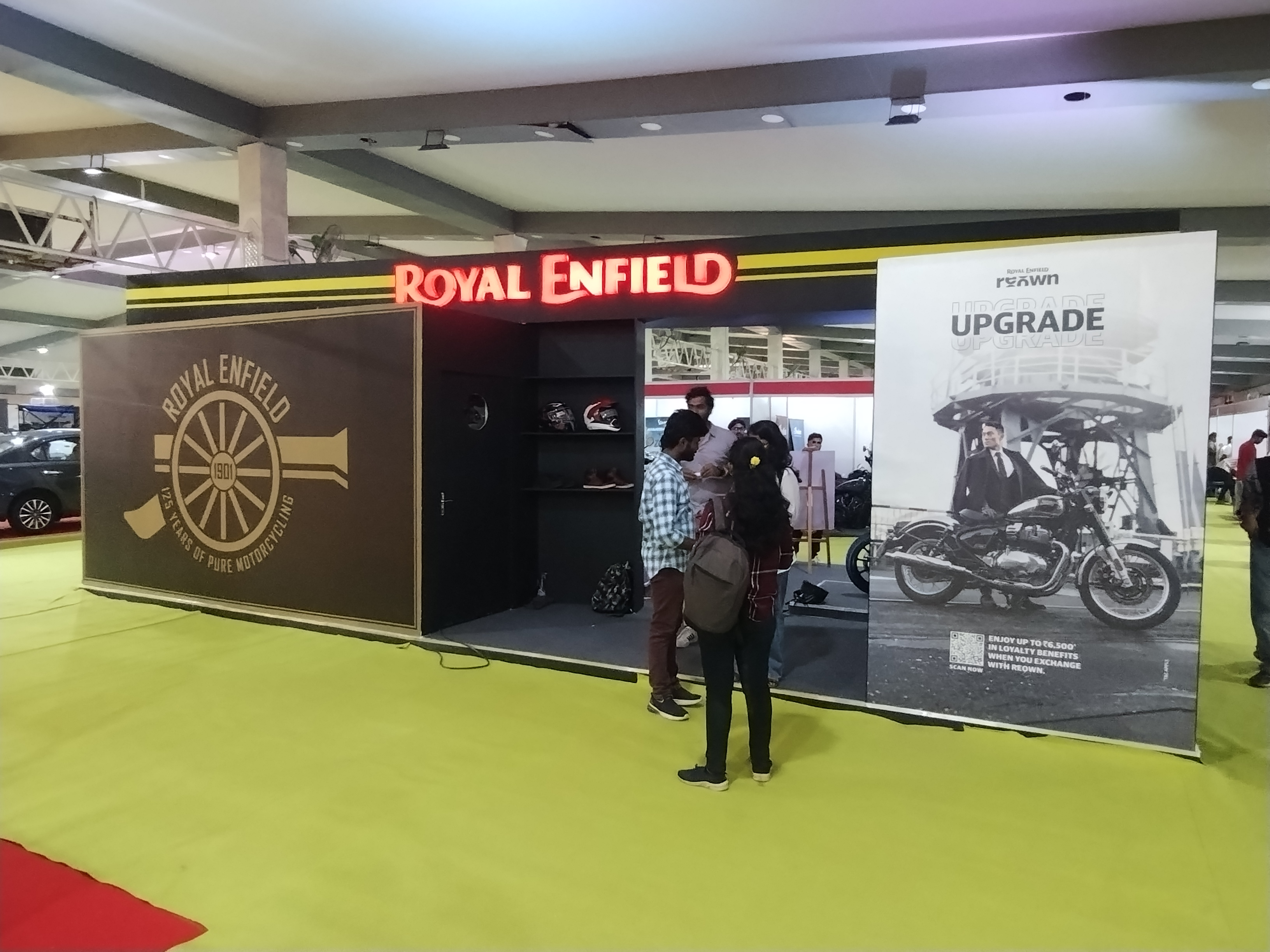
- Royal Enfield at 4th International Auto Show, Palace Grounds, Bengaluru (2025)
- Type: Subsidiary
- Industry: Automotive
- Predecessor: Royal Enfield (1901–1971)
- Founded: 1955; 71 years ago (as Enfield Motors) 1901; 125 years ago (as The Enfield Cycle Company Limited)
- Headquarters: Chennai, Tamil Nadu, India
- Areas served: Worldwide
- Key people: B Govindarajan (MD)
- Products: Motorcycles
- Production output: ▲846,000 units (2018)
- Brands: Flying Flea
- Revenue: ▲₹8,965 crore (US$960 million) (2018)
- Operating income: ▲₹2,808 crore (US$300 million) (2018)
- Net income: ▲₹1,960 crore (US$210 million) (2018)
- Parent: Eicher Motors
- Subsidiaries: Royal Enfield North America; Royal Enfield UK; Royal Enfield Brazil; Royal Enfield Thailand; Harris Performance Products
- Website: www.royalenfield.com

Royal Enfield is an Indian motorcycle manufacturer, headquartered and manufactured in Chennai, Tamil Nadu. Royal Enfield is the oldest motorcycle brand in continuous production.

The first Royal Enfield motorcycle was built in 1901 by The Enfield Cycle Company of Redditch, Worcestershire, England, the company was responsible for the design and original production of the 1932 Royal Enfield Bullet, the longest-lived motorcycle design in history. Licensed in 1955, from the original English Royal Enfield, by Madras Motors, since 1993 a subsidiary of Eicher Motors, an Indian automaker. The company makes classic-looking motorcycles, including the Royal Enfield Bullet, Classic 350, Royal Enfield Thunderbird, Meteor 350, Classic 500, Interceptor 650, Continental, and Hunter 350. Royal Enfield also makes adventure and off-road motorcycles like the Royal Enfield Himalayan. Their motorcycles are equipped with single-cylinder and twin-cylinder engines.

== History ==
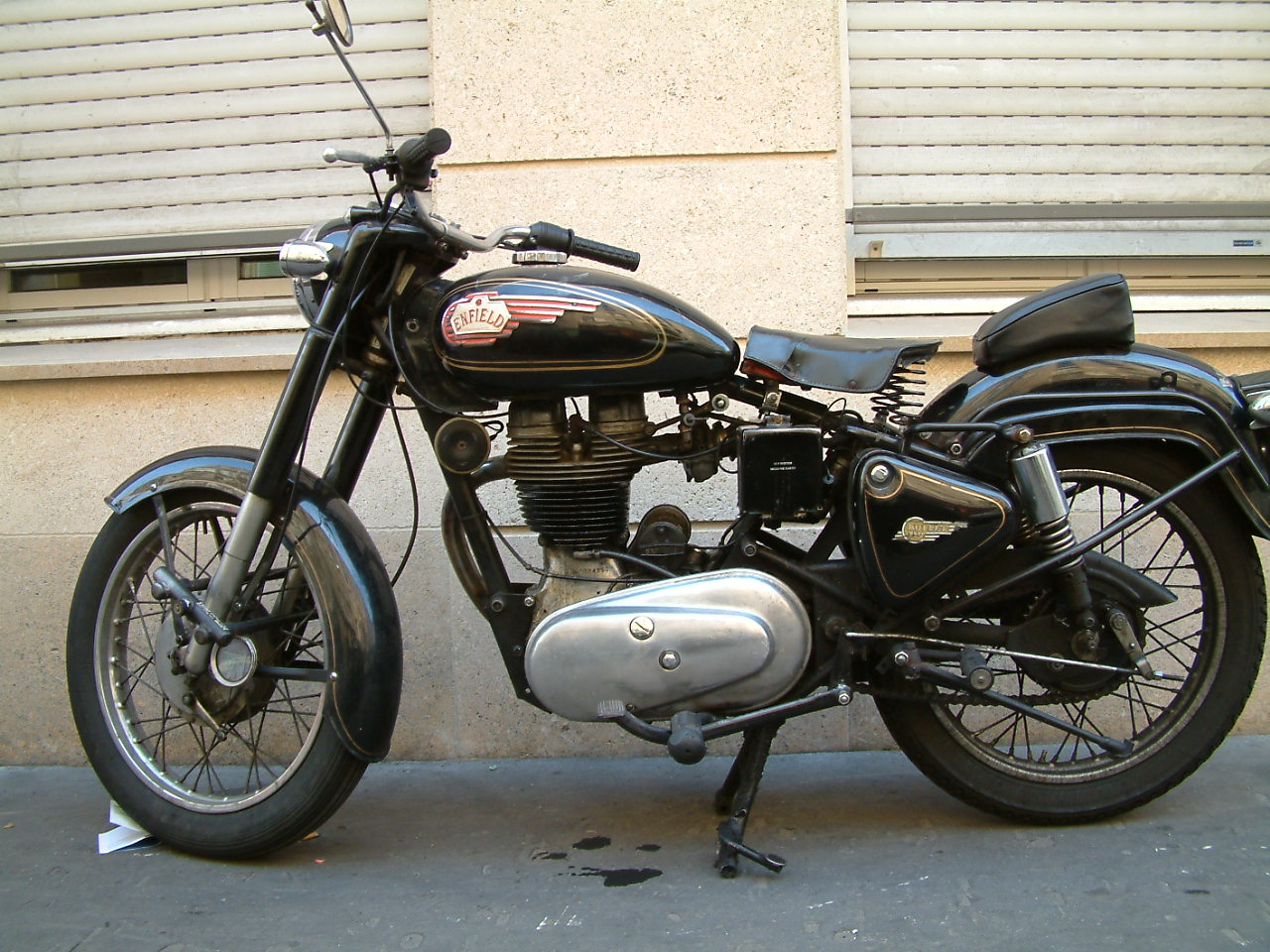
Bullet with plain "Enfield" tank badge

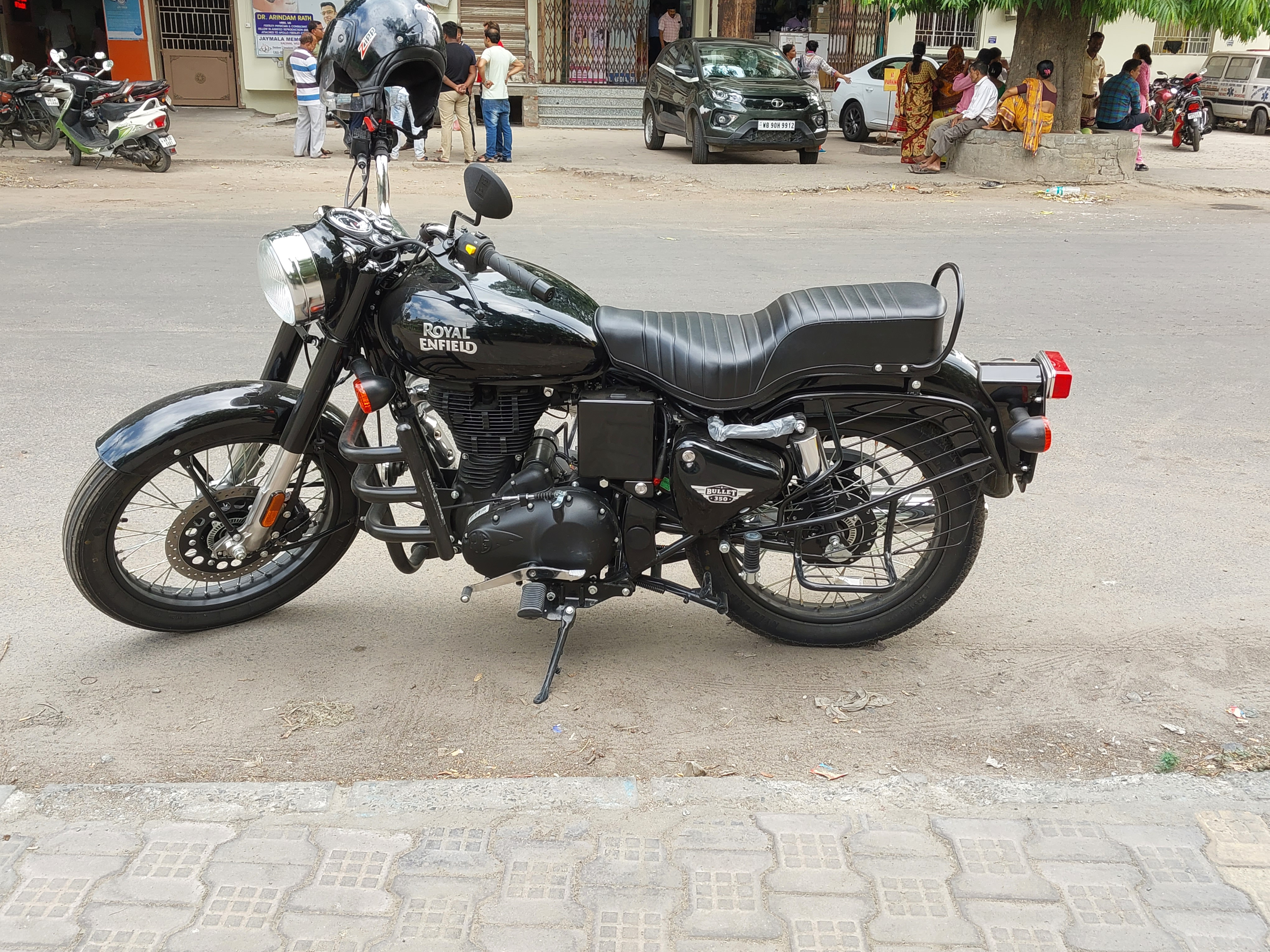
Royal Enfield Bullet Electra 350, Pure Black

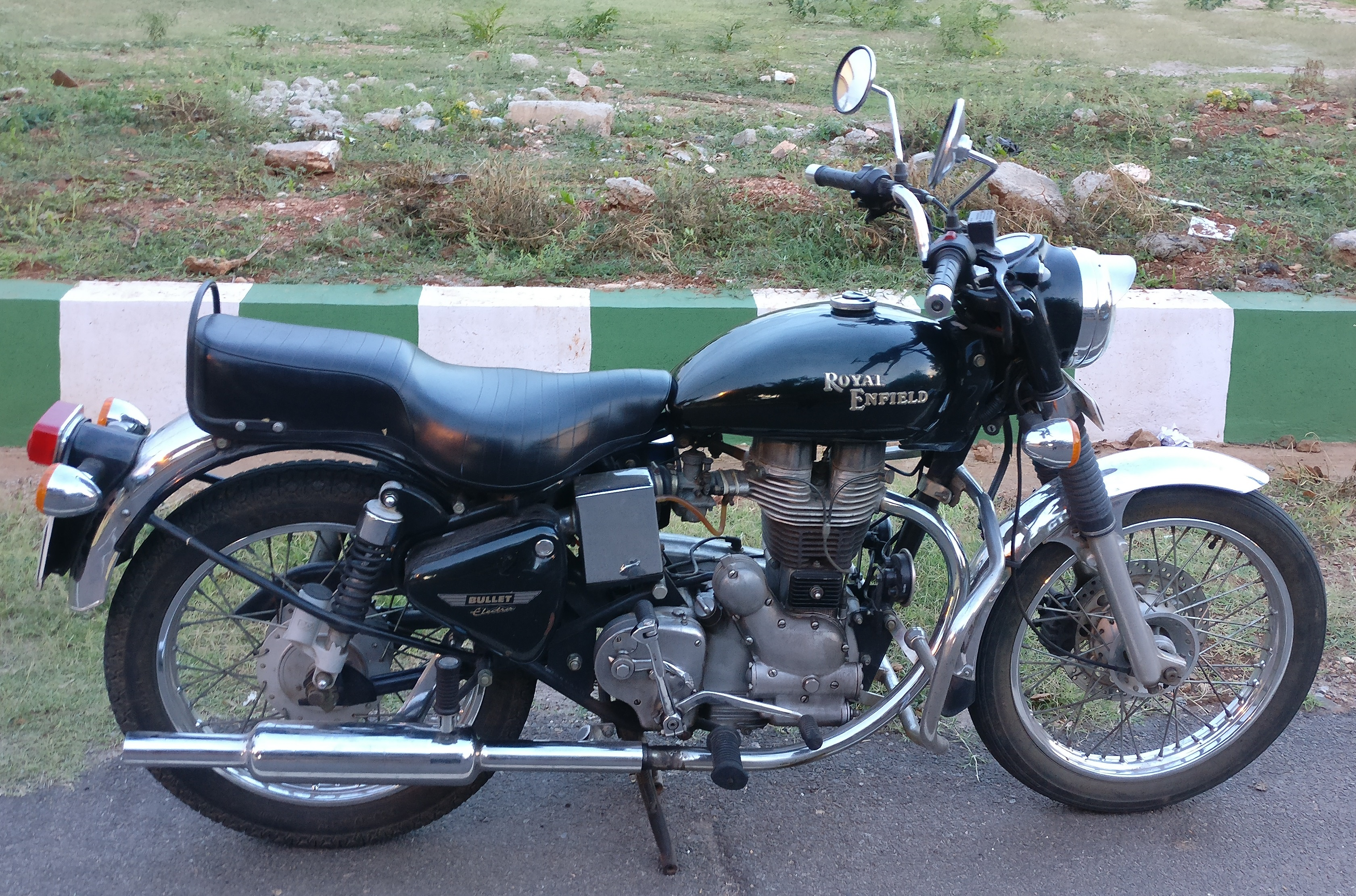
Royal Enfield Bullet Electra 350, 2004

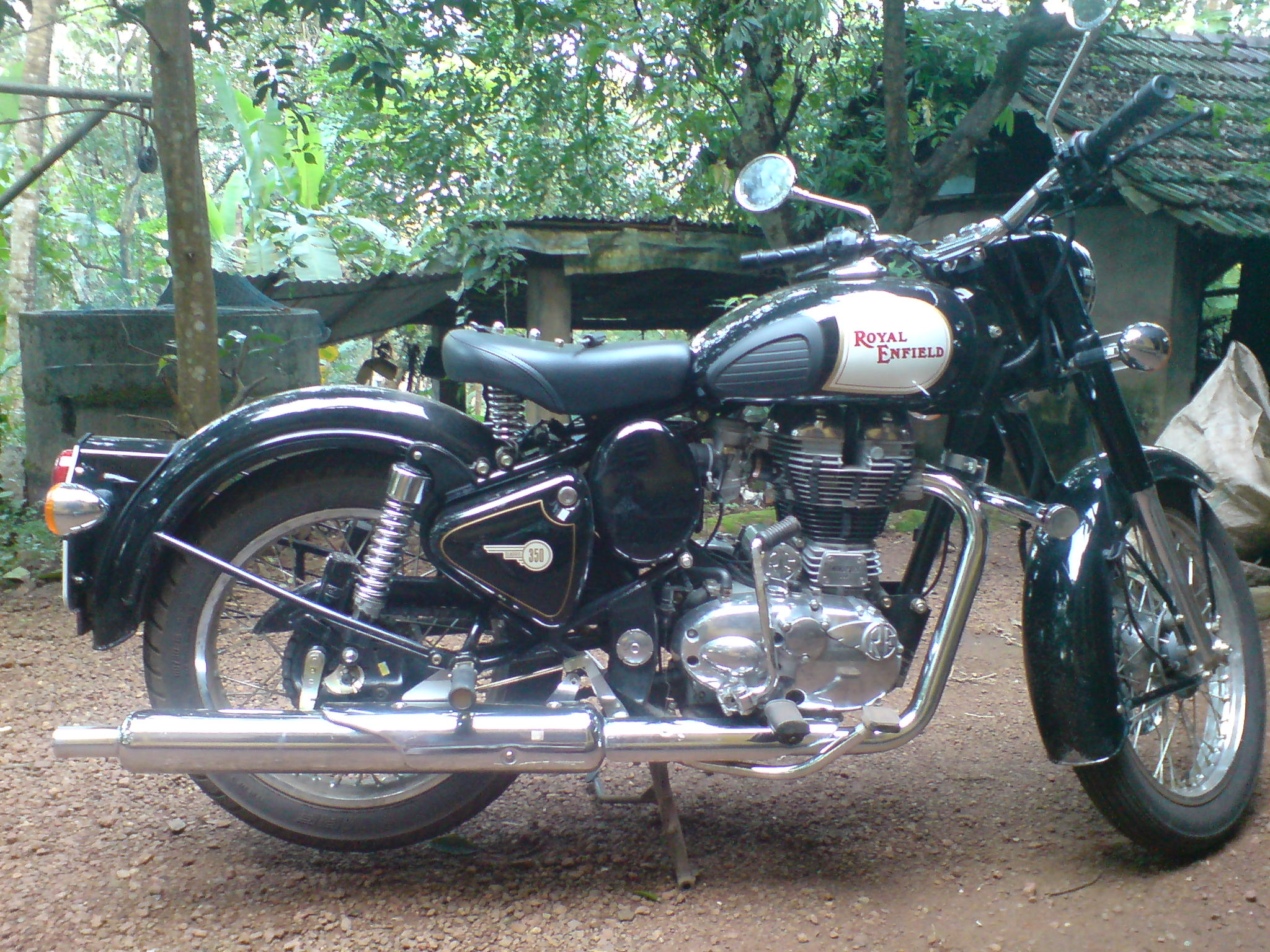
Royal Enfield Classic 350, 2010 model

Logo used from 1995 to early 2014

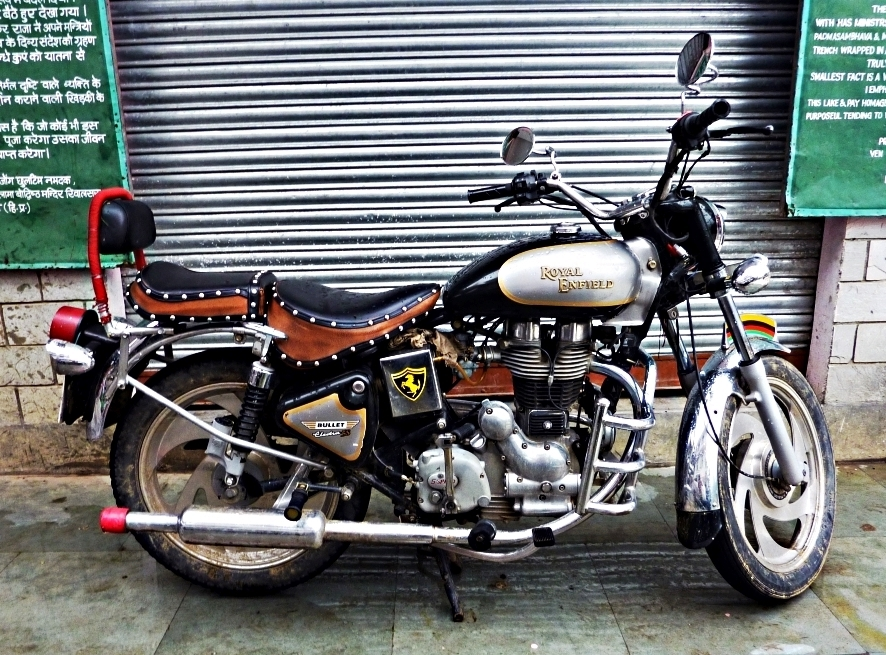
Royal Enfield Bullet, Lake Rewalsar. 2010

After India gained independence in 1947, its government looked for a suitable motorcycle for the army patrolling the borders. In 1952 they chose the Royal Enfield Bullet, in 1954 ordering 800 units of the 350 cc model. In 1955, the Redditch company partnered with Madras Motors in India to form 'Enfield India' to assemble, under licence, the 350 cc Royal Enfield Bullet motorcycle in Madras (now Chennai), including the factory tooling, sold to Enfield India. By 1962, all components were made in India. Enfield India used the 1960 engine (with metric bearing sizes); Royal Enfield still makes essentially the same bike in 350 cc and 500 cc models, and now different models for other market segments.

In the year 1990, Royal Enfield collaborated with the Eicher Group, an automotive company in India, and merged with it in 1994. Apart from bikes, Eicher Group is involved in the production and sales of commercial vehicles and automotive gears. Although Royal Enfield experienced difficulties in the 1990s, and ceased motorcycle production at their Jaipur factory in 2002, by 2013 the company opened a new primary factory in the Chennai suburb of Oragadam on the strength of increased demand for its motorcycles. This was followed in 2017 by the inauguration of another new factory of a similar size to the facility at Oragadam (capacity 600,000 vehicles per year) at Vallam Vadagal. The original factory at Tiruvottiyur became secondary, and continues to produce some limited-run motorcycle models.

In November 2015, a flooding, produced by the heaviest rainfall in Chennai in over a century, caused Royal Enfield to cut production by 4,000 motorcycles, followed by a shutdown of the plants in Tiruvottiyur and Oragadam on 1 December, as well as the company offices in Chennai. Production resumed at 50% capacity on 7 December and operations at both plants were back to normal on 14 December.

Royal Enfield announced its first takeover of another company in May 2015 with the purchase of a UK motorcycle design and manufacturing firm, Harris Performance Products, that had previously developed the chassis of the Royal Enfield Continental GT Cafe Racer. Harris work with the UK-based part of Royal Enfield's development team, who are based at the UK Technology Centre at Bruntingthorpe Proving Ground in Leicestershire. The team was established in January 2015, and moved into their new, purpose-built facility in May 2017. By the end of 2019, the team numbered 155 and carries out the full spectrum of design and development activities, from concept generation and clay design to engineering design, prototyping and validation.

Royal Enfield currently sells motorcycles in more than 50 countries. Royal Enfield surpassed Harley-Davidson in global sales in 2015.

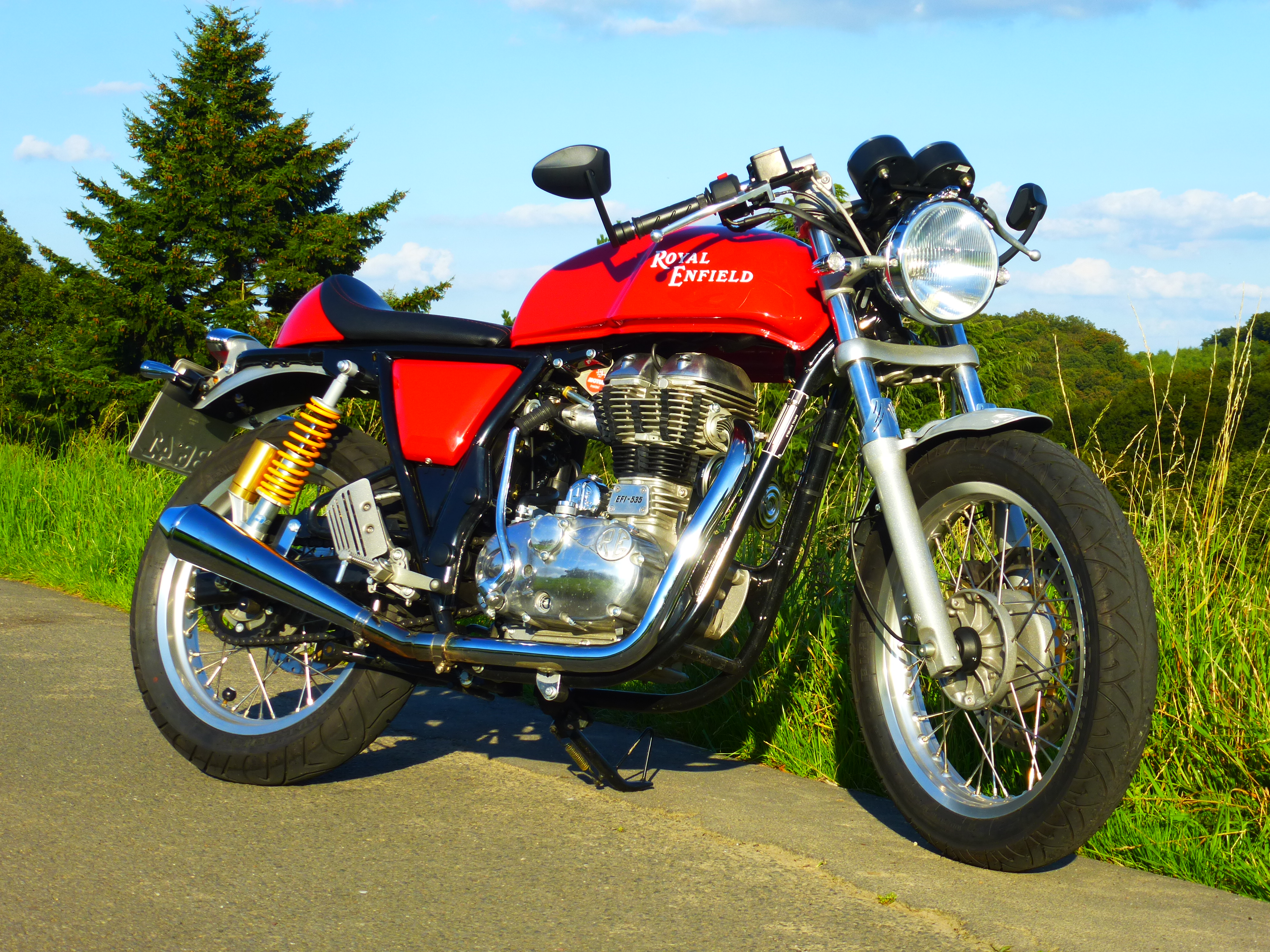
2014 Continental GT 535

In August 2015, Royal Enfield Motors announced it is establishing its North American headquarters and a dealership in Milwaukee, Wisconsin, with the intention to offer three bikes, the Bullet 500, Classic 500 and Continental GT 535 Cafe Racer as they feel this engine size represents an under-served market. The dealership will be Royal Enfield's first company-owned store in the U.S., according to Rod Copes, president of Royal Enfield North America. The company wants to establish about 100 dealerships in American cities starting with Milwaukee.

Later in August 2015, parent-business Eicher announced its entry in Indonesia as a part of its global strategy in the mid-sized (250–750 cc) motorcycle segment, initially starting retail operations from a dealership in Jakarta. From April to September, 2015, Royal Enfield's domestic sales were 50% higher than the previous year, despite a declining motorcycle market in India.

In May 2026, Royal Enfield announced to invest Rs 2,200 crore in two phases for setting up the manufacturing facility at Satyavedu in Tirupati district of Andhra Pradesh. The facility will expand the company's total annual capacity by 900,000 motorcycles from the current 1.46 million units.

== Motorcycles manufactured by Royal Enfield ==
=== Bullet ===
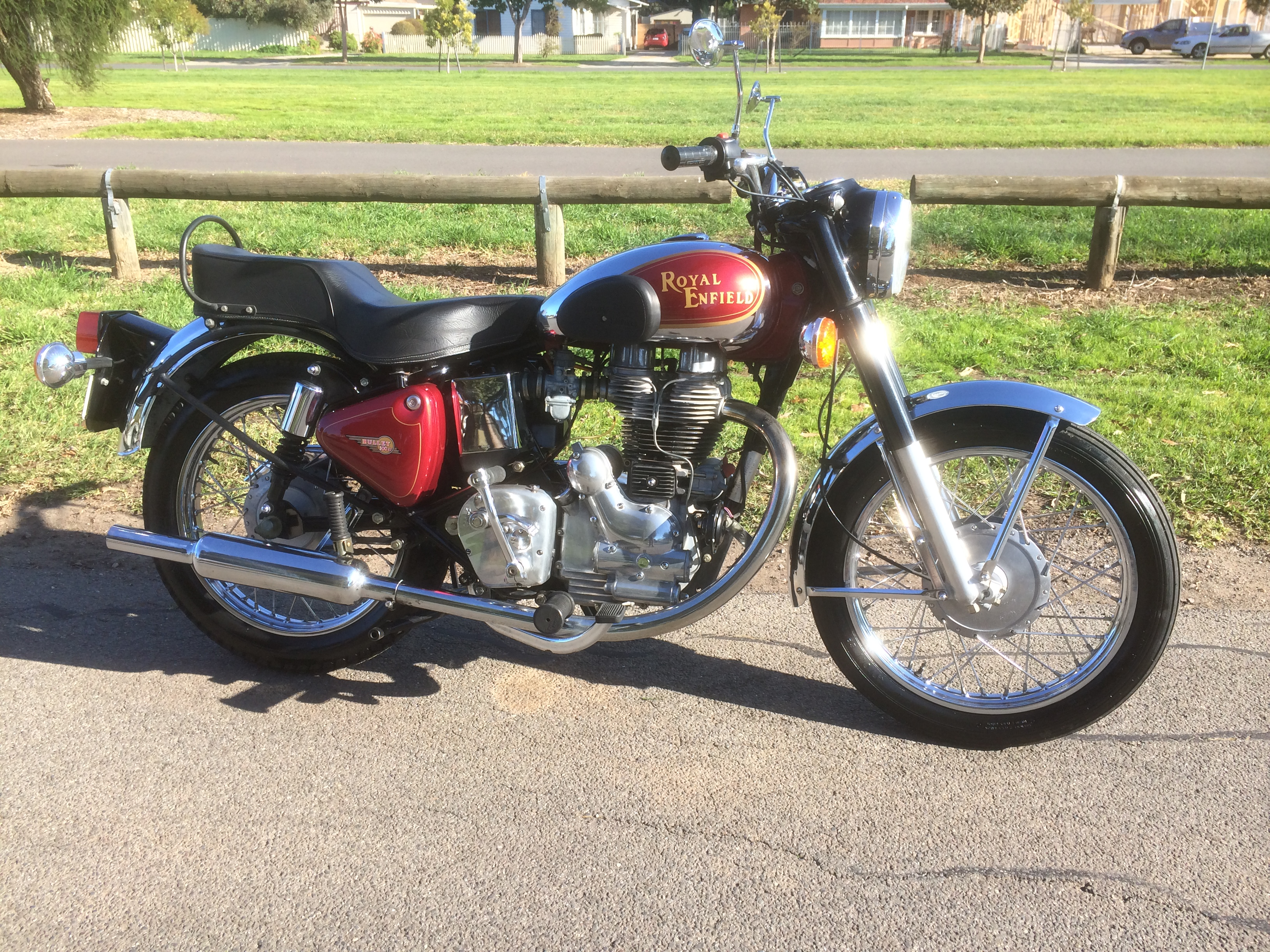
A 2002 model RE Bullet

The Royal Enfield Bullet has the longest unchanged production run of any motorcycle, having remained continuously in production since 1948. The Bullet marque is even older and has passed 75 years of continuous production. The Royal Enfield and Bullet names were derived from the British company which had been a subcontractor to the Royal Small Arms Factory in Enfield, London.

It has been long associated with the Police and Armed forces in India and owning one is considered a privilege by most Indians and continues to remain ever popular in India. Although the Bullet 500 was discontinued due to poor sales, The Next Generation Bullet 350 was launched on September 1, 2023. It has a retro style and is priced at ₹1.74 lakh (US$2,090) in India. In January 2024 Royal Enfield Bullet 350 was launched in two new colors- Military Silver Black and Military Silver Red.

==== Bullet 650 Unveiling at EICMA 2025 ====
Royal Enfield unveiled the Bullet 650 at EICMA 2025, featuring a 648cc parallel-twin engine producing 46 bhp at 7,250 rpm and 52.3 Nm torque at 5,650 rpm. The Bullet 650 will be sold from 2026 onwards in two colour options: Cannon Black and Battleship Blue. European and North American markets will be limited to the Cannon Black variant.

=== Classic 350/650 ===
Royal Enfield Classic 350 and Classic 500 are models of Royal Enfield motorcycles which have been in production since 2009. The Classic series of Royal Enfield motorcycles are inspired by the Royal Enfield G2 350cc Bullet motorcycle, first produced in 1948. It has also been confused often with the Bullet for their similar look in design as the Classic is a modernised version of the original Royal Enfield Bullet.

=== Hunter 350 ===
The Royal Enfield Hunter 350 is a roadster motorcycle launched by Royal Enfield in August 2022 in India. It is powered by 349cc BS6 engine that produces 20.2 bhp and 27 Nm of torque. The Hunter 350 is the most affordable motorcycle under the new J-platform, and the second least expensive bike after Royal Enfield Bullet 350. The motorcycle features a retro-style single-piece seat, a classic round headlamp, a flat handlebar and a sculpted fuel tank. Within a month of launch Hunter 350 becomes the second highest selling Royal Enfield motorcycle.

=== Shotgun 650 ===
Royal Enfield Shotgun 650 is a 648cc, parallel-twin motor that pumps out 46.40 bhp at 7,250rpm and a peak torque of 52.3Nm at 5,650rpm. The oil-cooled engine is paired to a six-speed gearbox, with a slipper clutch. The factory-custom bobber based on the same platform as the new Continental GT 650. A limited edition Shotgun was launched at the Motoverse 2023 with an attractive blue-and-black color scheme. Later on the production version was revealed which had the same specifications as the Motoverse edition except the color scheme.

=== Scram 440 ===
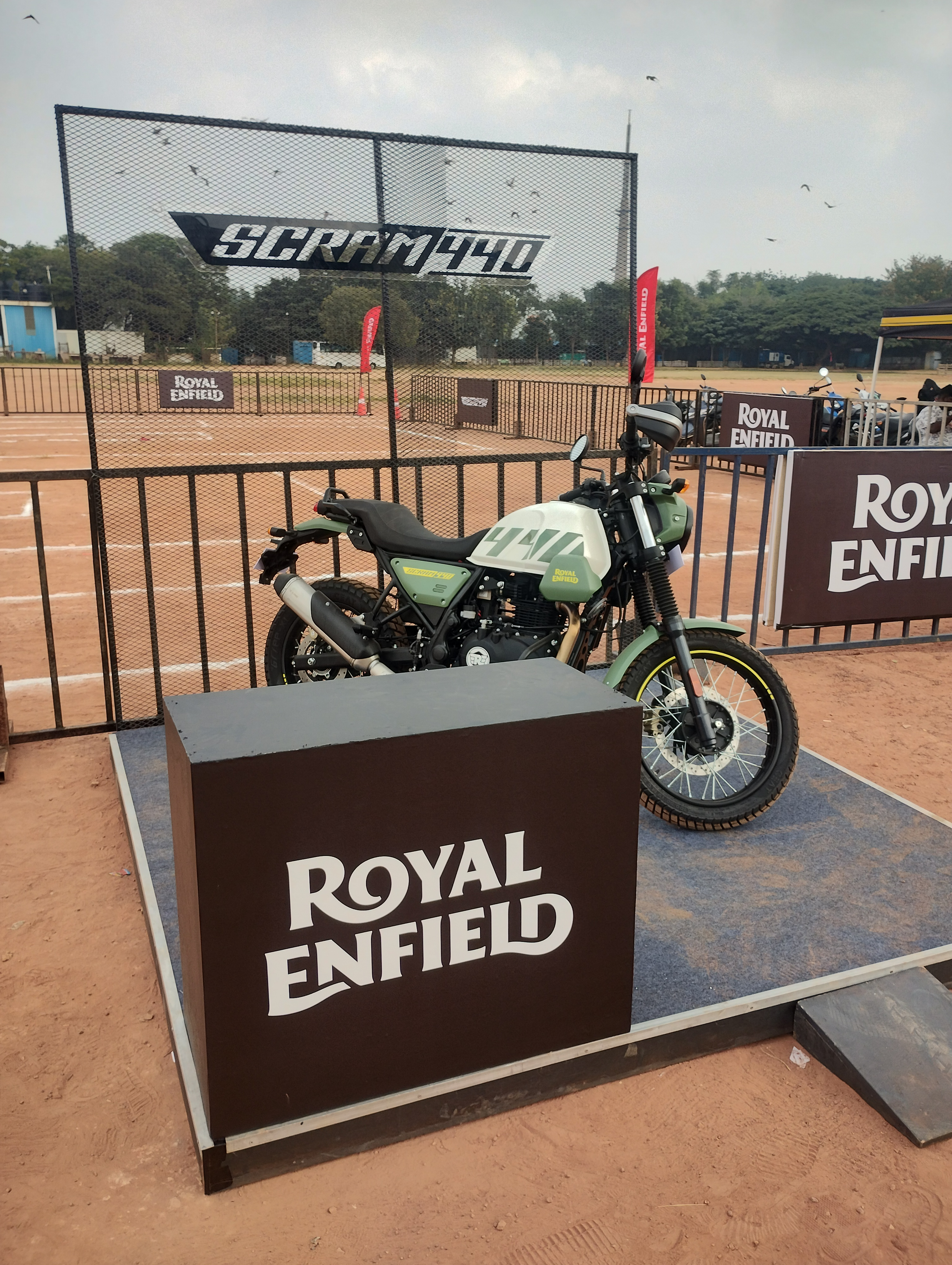
Scram 440 at 4th International Auto Show, Palace Grounds, Bangalore (2025)

The Royal Enfield Scram 440 is a minimalistic street scrambler which is a close cousin to the Himalayan 411, even saying "Himalayan Scram" on the side panels and has the same fuel tank as the 2015-2023 Himalayan. It is powered by a 411cc BS6-2.0 emissions standard air cooled engine which produces 24.3 bhp and 32 nm torque. It was launched in March 2022 as Enfield's first ADV crossover.

Royal Enfield unveiled a new Scram model called the "Scram 440", as a replacement for the Scram 411 based on the same engine platform in November 2024. The new update model features an updated engine which goes up in cubic capacity from 411cc to 443cc; Power and torque have climbed from 24.3 hp at 6,500rpm and 32Nm at 4,250rpm to 25.4 hp at 6,250rpm and 34Nm at 4,000rpm.

=== Himalayan 411/440/450/750 ===
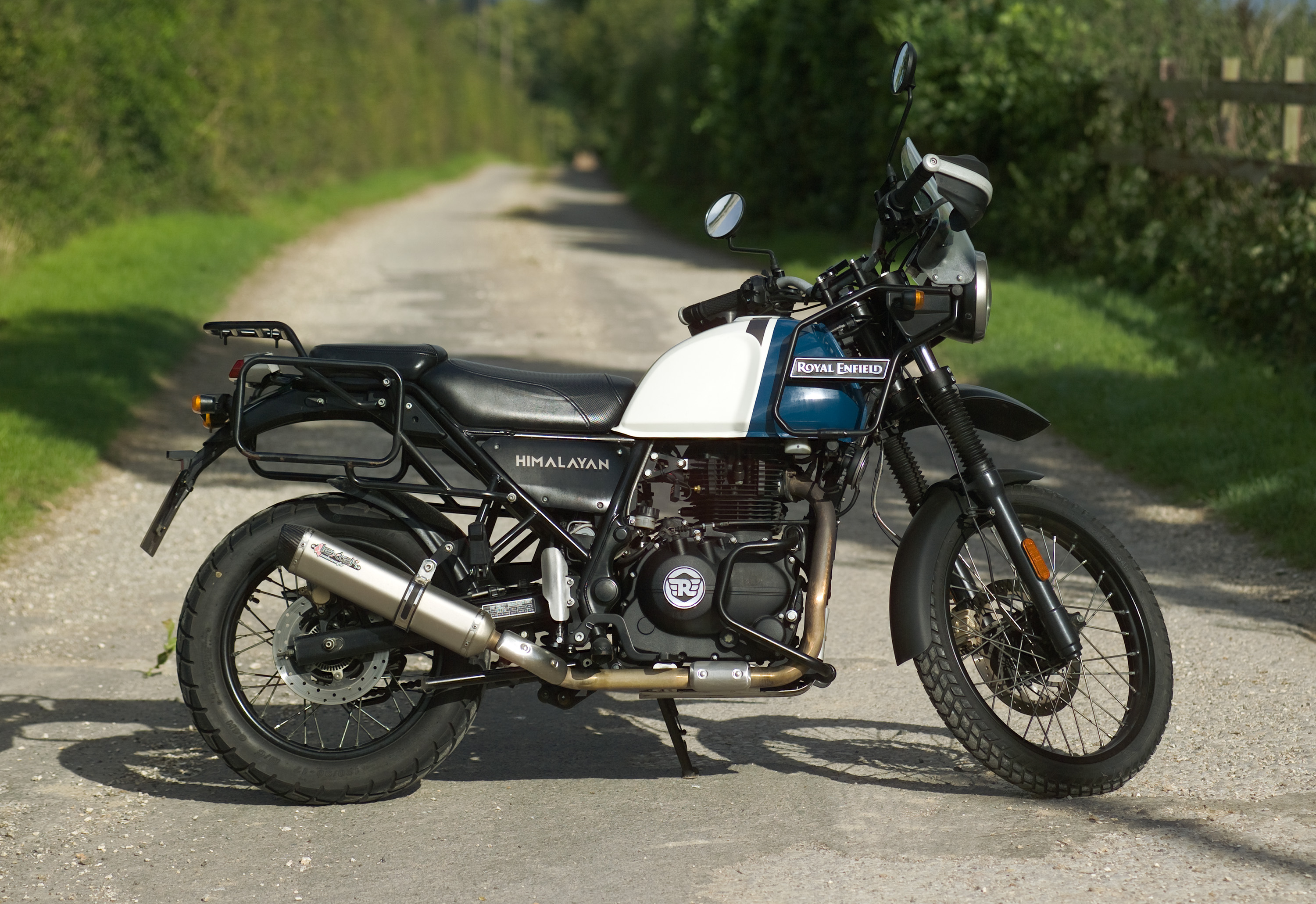
Original Royal Enfield Himalayan (2015–2023)

The Royal Enfield Himalayan is an adventure touring motorcycle manufactured by Royal Enfield. It was revealed in February 2015 and launched in early 2016. Pierre Terblanche led the design team during Himalayan's development. It is specially designed for use on adventure trails.

An entirely new Himalayan was launched on 24 November 2023, with a liquid cooled Sherpa 450 engine, switchable ABS as standard, and improved design and build quality. It is the first motorcycle in Royal Enfield's history to be powered by a liquid cooled engine. It was named the Royal Enfield Himalayan 450, and the old model was discontinued in November 2023.

=== Interceptor 650 and Continental GT 650 ===
Royal Enfield unveiled a 650 cc twin-cylinder engine at their Technology Centre, Harris Performance Products, in Leicestershire, England, in November 2017 to power a new generation of Royal Enfield motorcycles. It was showcased at the Milan Motorcycle Show on 7 November 2017 in Italy, where two motorcycles based on the engine, the Interceptor 650 and Continental GT 650 were revealed. Both models were introduced to the US market in November 2018 to positive reviews. The Interceptor is marketed as the INT650 in the United States where Honda has a trademark on the "Interceptor" name. In 2020 to 2021, the 650cc twins were the best-selling motorcycles in Great Britain.

The Royal Enfield Continental GT is a Neo-retro Café Racer. The first model to use the name, the Continental GT 250, was produced by Royal Enfield in 1960s Britain. The name was revived in the 2010s with the Continental GT 535 (now discontinued) and Continental GT 650.

=== Meteor 350/Super Meteor 650 ===
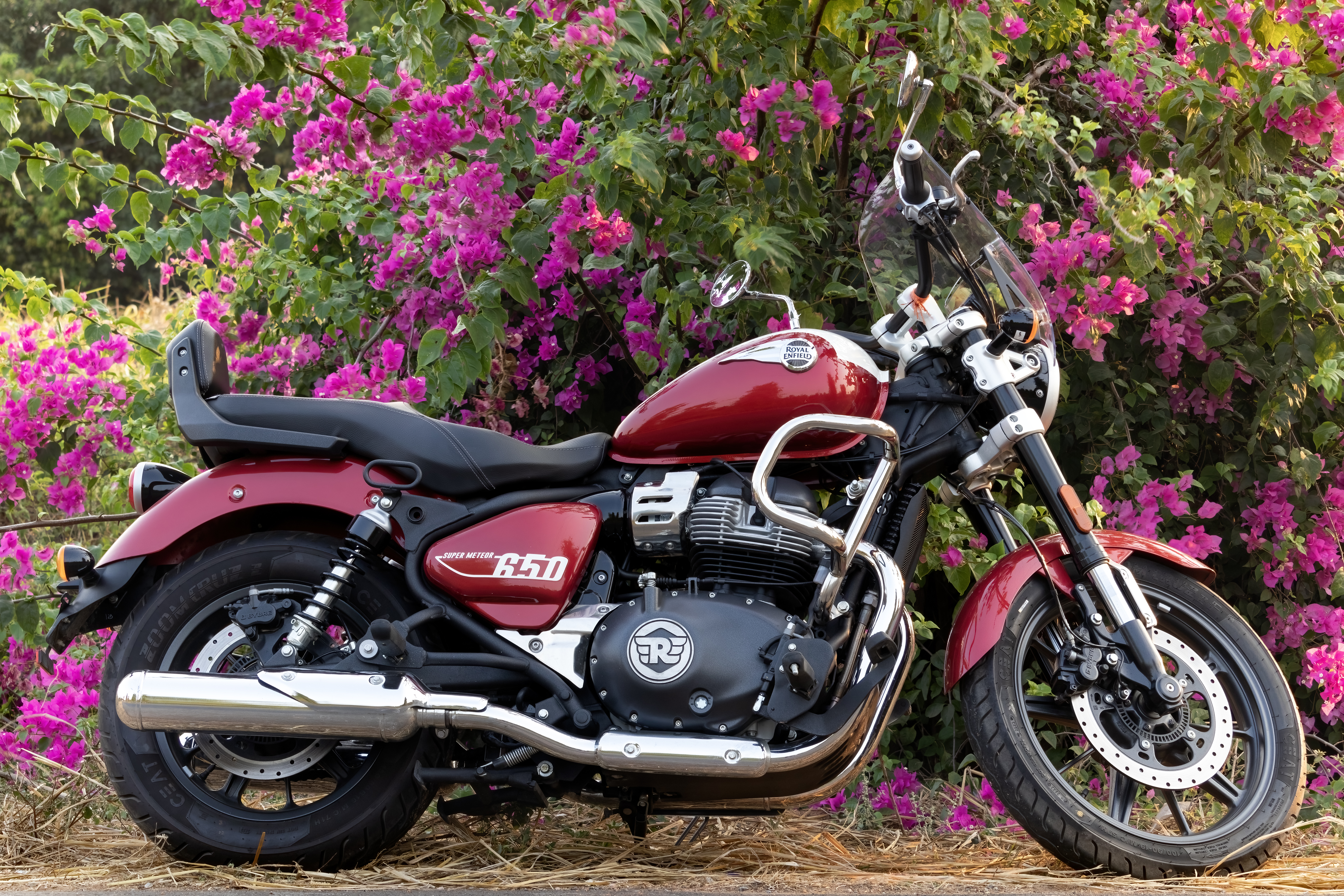
Super Meteor 650 Celestial Red variant

Royal Enfield launched a new lineup of cruiser motorcycles on 6 November 2020 named the Meteor. It replaced the Thunderbird 350 and 350X series which were discontinued earlier that year. It uses a 349 cc single cylinder engine featuring a single overhead camshaft system (SOHC), and a completely new engine with fewer moving parts than the 346 cc. A 648 cc, air cooled version of the bike has been revealed named the Royal Enfield Super Meteor 650 which was released on January 16, 2023. It is the first Royal Enfield to offer the Tripper navigation system.

=== Guerrilla 450 ===
The Royal Enfield Guerrilla 420 is a new roadster unveiled on 17 July 2024 by Royal Enfield. It is based on the 2023 Himalayan featuring the same chassis, 6-speed gearbox, and the 452cc liquid-cooled Sherpa Engine, with 39.47 bhp and 40 Nm of torque. The Guerrilla features a new rear sub-frame, 17 inch alloy wheels, and a 140mm telescopic fork front suspension, while reducing the stroke value of the rear suspension to 150mm. The bike features a minimalistic design with a smaller 11 litre fuel tank while retaining the round LED headlamp and flat-style handlebar, common amongst its three variants.

=== Bear 650 ===
The Royal Enfield Interceptor Bear 650 was officially released on October 31, 2024. It has been described as "a stylish scrambler-styled standard based primarily on the brand's Interceptor 650 model, though with some notable differences."

On the Design and Styling front, Bear 650 comes with a scrambler seat, side panel number boards, and urban-off-road aesthetics.

This motorcycle uses Showa USD Forks borrowed from the Shotgun 650, but optimized for scrambler duties with longer suspension travel. To complement its off-road credentials, the ride height has been raised. The Interceptor Bear 650 retains the Interceptor 650's brakes but upgrades the front disc size for added stopping power along with Dual-channel ABS with a switchable rear ABS.

Equipped with a full-color TFT screen with integrated navigation brings modern tech to the classic platform. It is powered by Royal Enfield's 650-cc engine, and it is tuned to increase torque by a marginal amount, and saves weight because of its two-into-one exhaust system.

== Electric vehicles ==
Royal Enfield confirmed its first electric motorcycle, the Flying Flea C6, will launch globally in 2026, with Europe as the debut market followed by India. The CEO confirmed the rollout will begin with Flying Flea C6, followed by Flying Flea S6. The Royal Enfield Flying Flea C6 is available in two shades; Storm Black & Flea Green.

== Subsidiaries ==
In March 2024, Eicher Motors incorporated 100% subsidiary 'Royal Enfield Europe B.V.' in the Netherlands to enhance the non-motorcycle supply chain for Europe.

== Brand initiatives ==
In June 2025, Royal Enfield Social Mission partnered with UNESCO to premiere the third edition of 'The Great Himalayan Exploration' docuseries on National Geographic India, streaming exclusively on JioHotstar starting June 21. The four-episode series documents the Intangible Cultural Heritage practices of Ladakh.

== Manufacturing plants ==
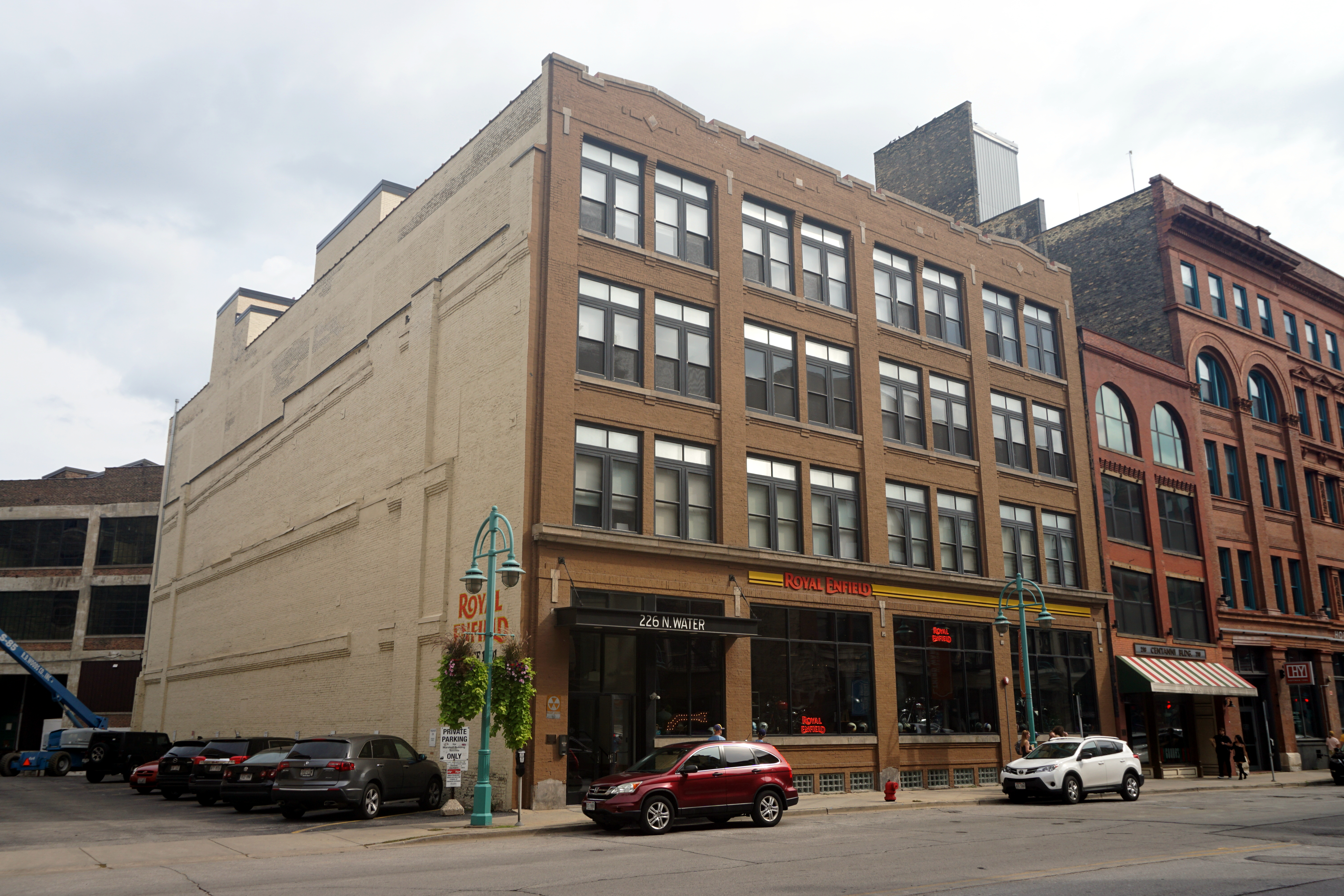
Royal Enfield North America headquarters in Milwaukee

1. Thiruvottiyur, Chennai, Tamil Nadu, India
2. Oragadam Industrial Corridor, Oragadam, Chennai, Tamil Nadu, India
3. SIPCOT Industrial Park, Vallam Vadagal, Chennai, Tamil Nadu, India

== See also ==
- List of Royal Enfield motorcycles
