= Royal Enfield Bullet =

Motorcycle

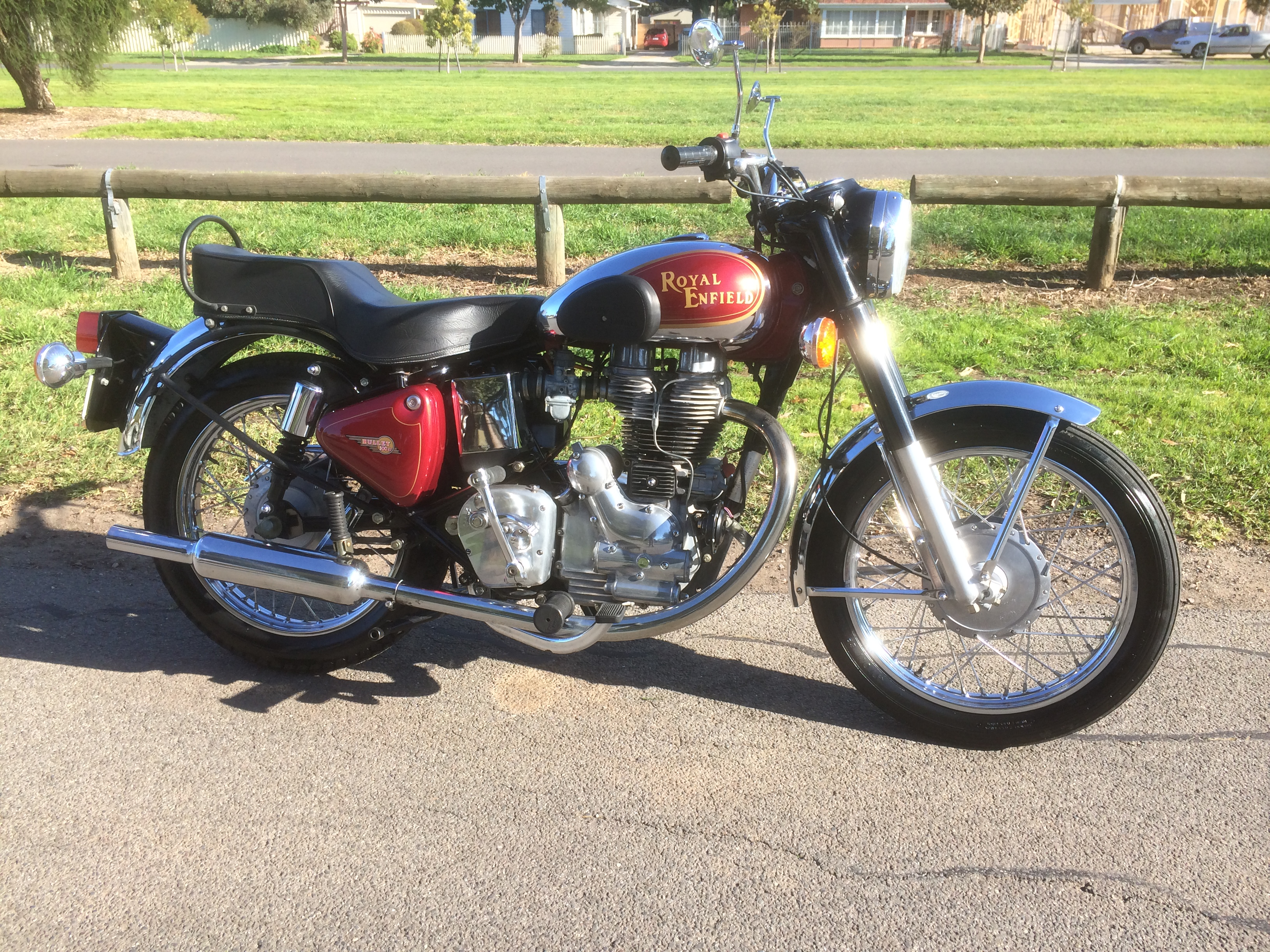
- Manufacturer: Royal Enfield, UK (1931–1966); Royal Enfield, India (1955–present)
- Parent company: Eicher Motors
- Production: 1931-present
- Class: Standard, Retro cruiser
- Engine: 346 cc (21.1 cu in) or 499 cc (30.5 cu in), cast-iron, lean-burn, or UCE, OHV single
- Bore / stroke: 70 mm × 90 mm (2.8 in × 3.5 in); 84 mm × 90 mm (3.3 in × 3.5 in)
- Transmission: 4-speed Albion gearbox, right foot change with neutral finder lever from second, third and fourth gears / 5-speed left-shift gearbox / 5-speed integrated gearbox
- Wheelbase: 1,370 mm (54 in)
- Dimensions: L: 2,120 mm (83 in); W: 750 mm (30 in); H: 1,080 mm (43 in)
- Weight: 350 pounds (160 kg) (dry)
- Fuel capacity: 3.5 imp gal (16 L; 4.2 US gal)
- Related: Royal Enfield Classic

The Royal Enfield Bullet is an overhead valve, single-cylinder, four-stroke motorcycle initially made by Royal Enfield in Redditch, Worcestershire England. It is now produced by Royal Enfield at Chennai, Tamil Nadu, India, a company originally founded by Madras Motors to build Royal Enfield motorcycles under licence in India. The Royal Enfield Bullet has the longest and unchanged production run of any motorcycle having remained continuously in production since 1932. The Bullet marque is even older and has passed 75 years of continuous production. The Royal Enfield and Bullet names were derived from the British company which had been a subcontractor to the Royal Small Arms Factory in Enfield, London.

== Evolution ==
The Bullet has evolved from a four-stroke engine with exposed valve-gear to the latest all-alloy unit construction engine with electronic fuel-injection.

=== 1932–1939 ===
Royal Enfield Bullet
- Manufacturer: Royal Enfield, UK
- Production: 1932–1939
- Successor: Royal Enfield Bullet
- Engine: 346 cc & 499 cc single cylinder OHV

Introduced in 1932 as a four-stroke single-cylinder motorcycle, this model was the first to feature the Bullet name. It was different in a number of ways from its successors (which are now familiar): it had an inclined engine with exposed valve gear featuring four valves per cylinder with 350 cc and 500 cc options. In 1933, a 250 cc option was also added to the range. Its frame was also considerably different, having centre-spring girder front forks, being among a new range of models from Royal Enfield that featured them, along with a saddle-type fuel tank. However, common to motorcycles of this period, it had a rigid rear-end, necessitating a 'sprung' seat for the rider, which resulted in the iconic look of the motorcycle that is much replicated today, even though the sprung seat is unnecessary in modern models.

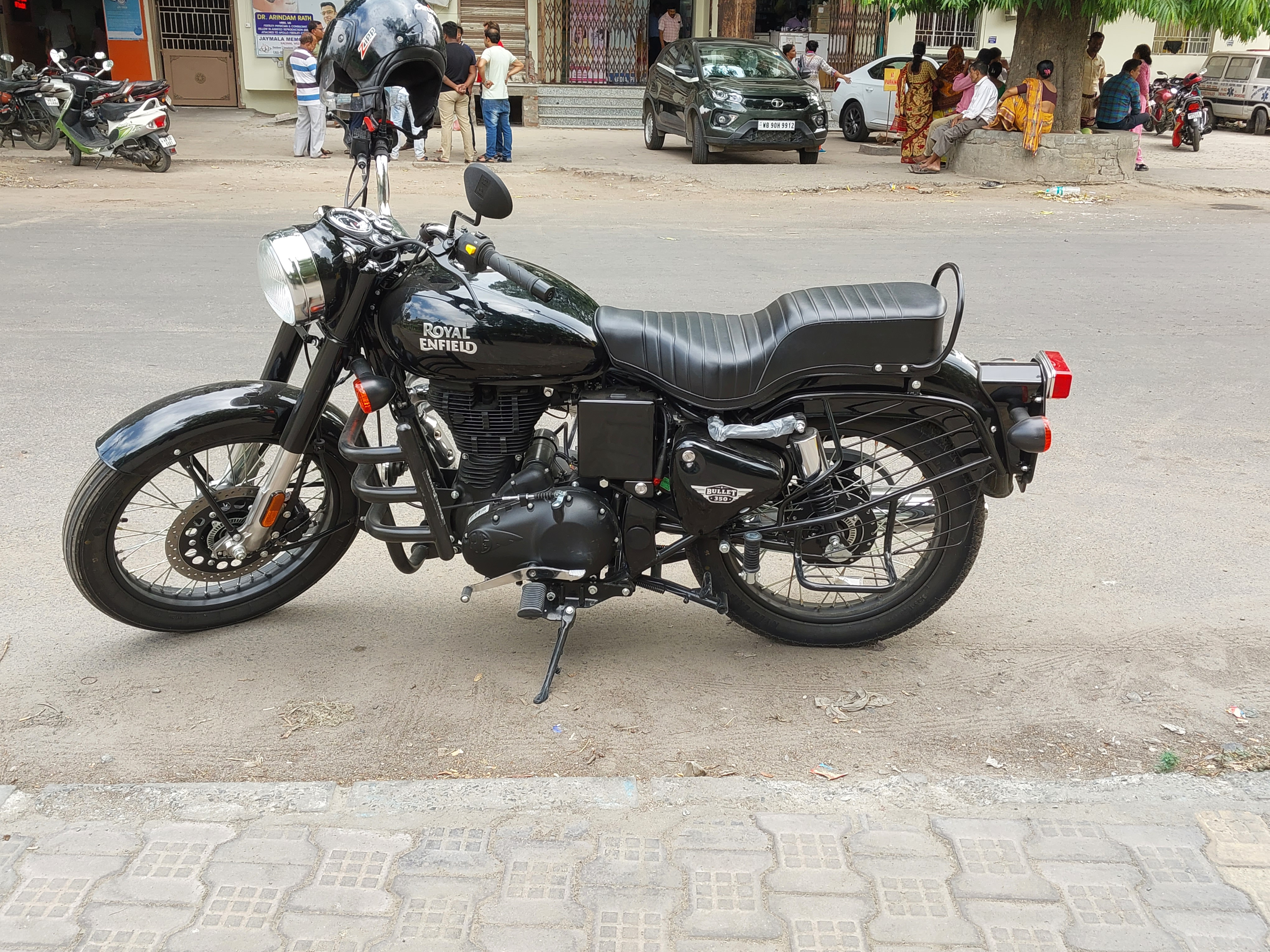
Royal Enfield Bullet Electra

After competition success the 350 cc Royal Enfield Bullet was bought by the British Army for dispatch riders and 3,000 were also supplied to the RAF during the Second World War.

=== 1939–1949 ===
Royal Enfield Bullet
- Manufacturer: Royal Enfield, UK
- Production: 1939–1948
- Successor: Royal Enfield Bullet 350
- Engine: 346 cc single cylinder OHV

This model refreshed Royal Enfield's model line-up for 1939. It differed in cosmetic details, as well as in having two rocker boxes, which resulted in higher volumetric efficiency for the engine. The post-war models incorporated a hydraulic front fork, and Enfield were among the first among British bikes to develop a fully incorporated swing-arm frame rear suspension. The "bullet" engine also used an aluminium cylinder head.

=== 1949–1956 ===
Royal Enfield Bullet
- Manufacturer: Royal Enfield, UK
- Production: 1948–1956
- Successor: Royal Enfield Bullet 350/500
- Engine: 346 cc & 499 cc single cylinder OHV

A number of changes were implemented in order to bring the bike up to date. This model featured a vertical engine with an alloy head and higher compression. The frame was changed to a fully sprung design using a swing arm with non-adjustable hydraulic shockers at the rear, while the front used a brand-new telescopic fork of Royal Enfield's own design. This enabled the introduction of a dual seat made of simple foam with no large springs. Power transmission was via the same four-speed Albion gearbox as the previous model, with a unique 'neutral-finder' lever the rider could press from any gear other than first to shift to neutral. The crankshaft continued to have a fully floating big-end bearing. The headlight assembly was enclosed with the speedometer and ammeter into a nacelle, which also served as the attachment of the front suspension as well as the handlebars. An otherwise similar model, but with an engine displacement of 499 cc, made its debut in 1953.

The prototype had done well in a performance trial and went on to win the trophy at the 1948 International Six Days Trial, two Bullet riders won gold medals. In 1952 Johnny Brittain won the Scottish Six Days Trial on a Royal Enfield Bullet and in 1953 he also won the International Six Days Trial without losing a single point.

In 1949, the Indian Army ordered Royal Enfield Bullets for border patrol use and the company decided to open a factory in Madras. In 1955, the 350 cc Bullets were sent from the Redditch factory in kit form for assembly in India, but Enfield India Ltd. soon developed the factory and produced complete motorcycles independently under licence. The 1955 model remained almost unchanged for years and Madras produced over 20,000 Bullets annually.

=== 1956–1969 ===
Royal Enfield Bullet
- Manufacturer: Royal Enfield, UK
- Production: 1956–1964
- Successor: Royal Enfield Bullet 350/500
- Engine: 346 cc & 499 cc single cylinder OHV

In 1955, Royal Enfield carried out some retooling and redesign at their Redditch plant, in the UK, to modernise the Bullet, and in 1959 some changes were made to the gear ratios. These changes, however, were not incorporated by the Indian arm due to its commitment to supply the Indian Army. Thus the British and Indian lines diverged, never to meet again.

Between 1956 and 1960, the British Bullet was released in several models, including a 350 cc Trials "works replica" version, a 350 cc "Clipper" model and in 1958 the Airflow version. This model had full weather protection from a large fibreglass fairing and included panniers for touring. The design was developed in partnership with British Plastics and featured as a series in The Motor Cycle magazine. The engines were the same and the only differences were in exhaust, seating, instrumentation, handlebars and fuel tank. Numerous technical improvements were also made, including moving to alternator charging (1956) and coil ignition (1960). The 350 cc model continued in production, but the 500 cc model was discontinued in 1961. In 1962, the UK company was sold and the Bullet discontinued and in 1967, the Redditch factory closed. Finally, in 1970, Royal Enfield closed down completely.

Additional to the 'separate gearbox' Bullet the Royal Enfield Redditch factory produced approximately 250 'unit construction' (integral gearbox) Bullets bikes known as 'New Bullets'. Produced in five batches of fifty between 1963 and 1965 these models were essentially a 350 Crusader. However, unlike their 'one-piece cranked' smaller sibling the New Bullet had a built-up crank and the traditional Bullet bore and stroke dimensions under a Crusader cylinder head. These bikes are difficult to identify as being different from the Crusader. Look for a ten finned barrel on a Crusader and you will have found a New Bullet. By necessity, the toolbox air intake slot is also a little higher. Other variations from the unit 250 include a 46 tooth rear sprocket, an outrigger bearing on the primary side crankcase a four plate clutch, and wider gear cogs. The petrol tank is similar to the earlier unit range item (not the Clipper tank) but has a larger cut out on the underside to clear the taller motor making it 1/4 gallon light on capacity. A New Bullet was modelled for sale to the army and carried panniers and a 'speedo-only' style of the casket. According to RE data, 232 of these bikes were produced, making them a scarce and desirable machine today.

=== 1955–1995 ===
Enfield Bullet
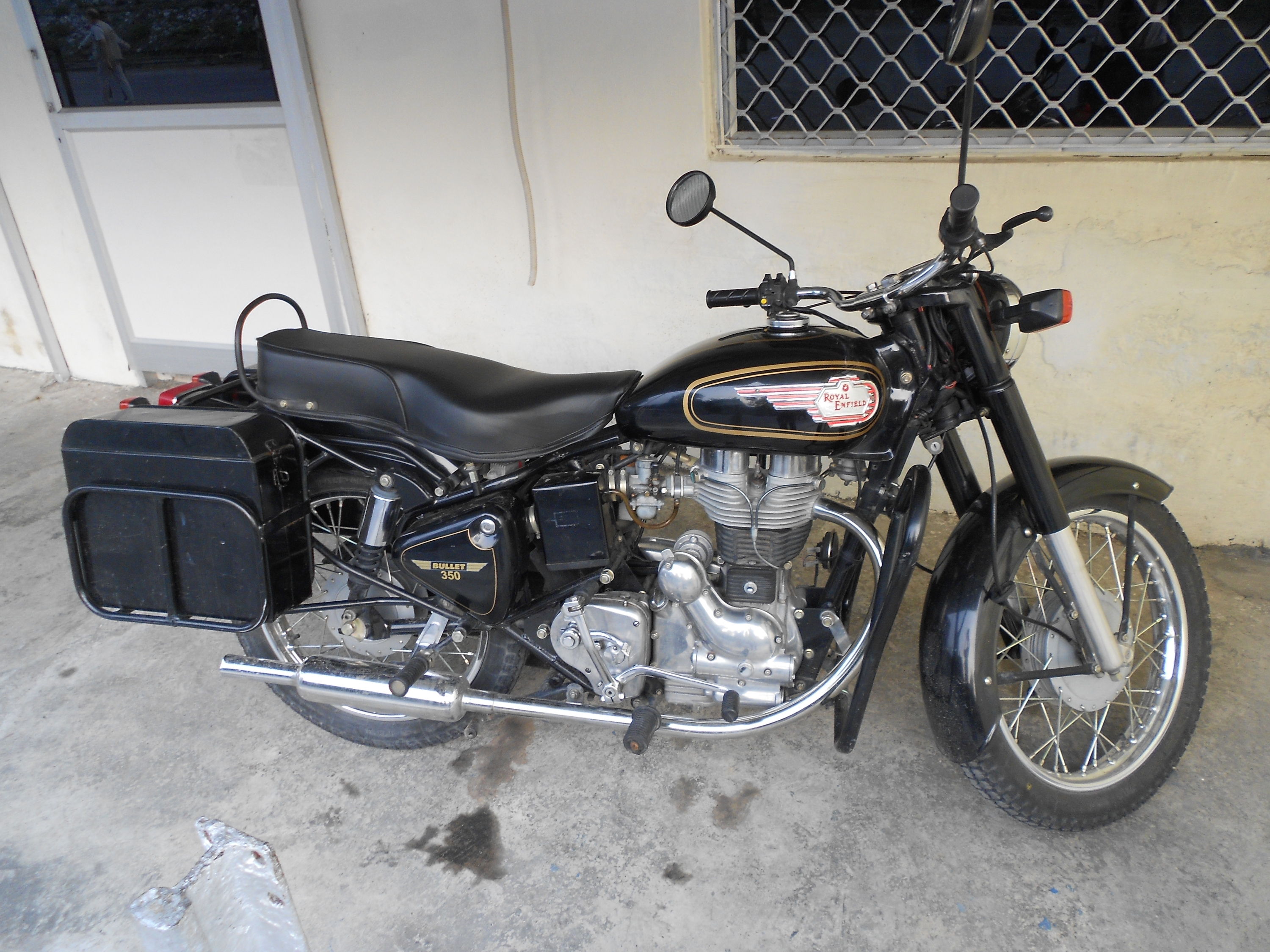
- Manufacturer: Enfield Ltd., India
- Production: 1955–1995
- Successor: Royal Enfield Bullet 350/Electra/Machismo
- Engine: 346 cc single cylinder OHV

Enfield India Ltd. continued production of the 1955 Bullet design almost unchanged, re-introducing it to the British market in 1977 under the name 'Enfield'. This was a period of stagnation for the Bullet.

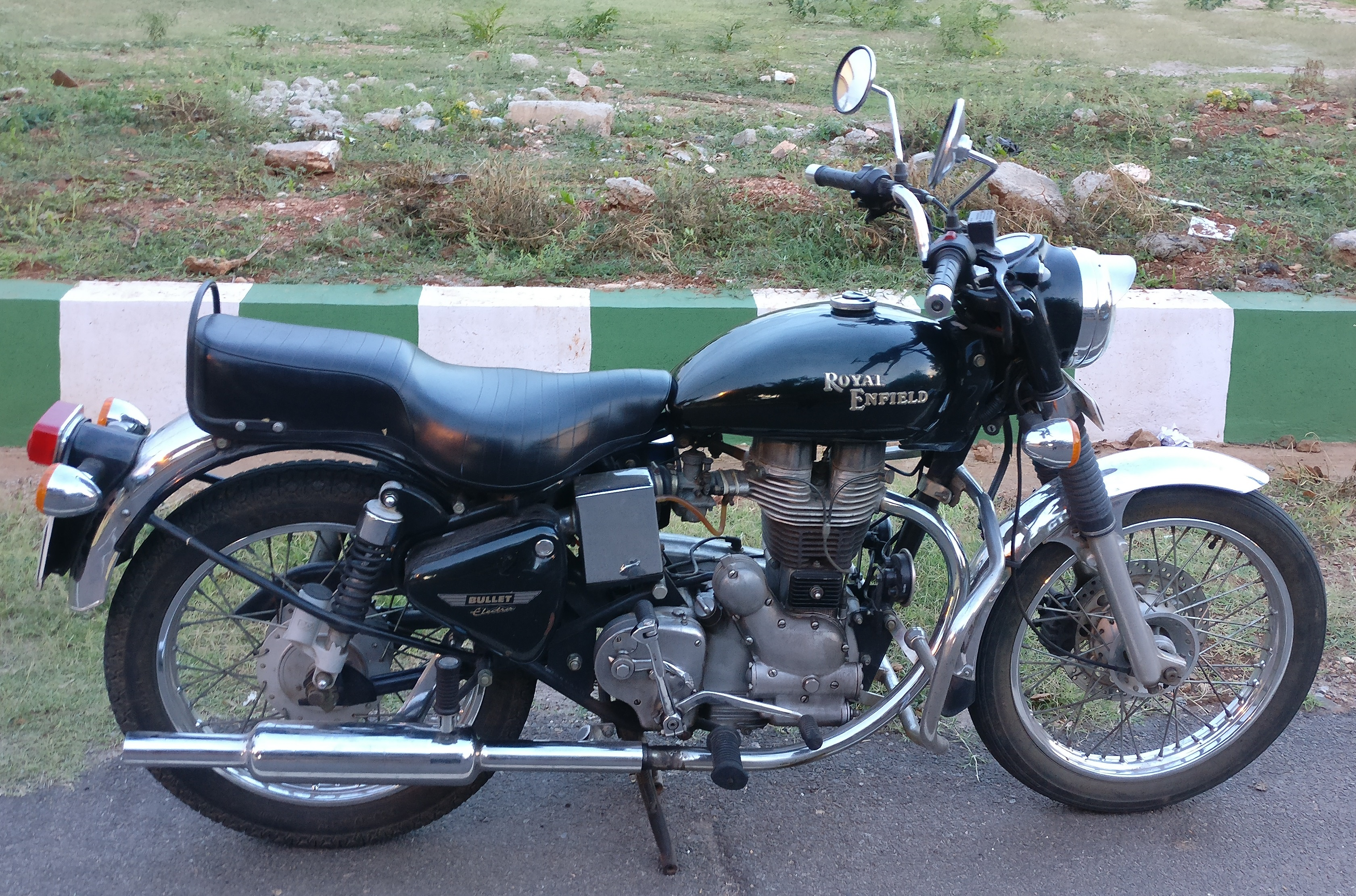
Royal Enfield Bullet Electra 350, 2004

Due to the protectionist nature of the Indian economy, no need for improvement was apparent, and the brand survived into the 1990s essentially as a domestic Indian commuter bike. Equivalent bikes in the market were the Yamaha RD350 and the Yezdi. Both bikes enjoy a cult following in India but have been out of production for decades. However, this could not prevent the erosion of the bike's market once the economy was sufficiently opened up to allow the Japanese motorbikes. The bike's high fuel consumption (its main competition was from bikes with superior and more economical 100 cc engines) caused a descending spiral of sales until the company, near bankruptcy, was bought out by Eicher Motors, a tractor and commercial vehicle manufacturer.

=== 1995–1997 ===
Royal Enfield Bullet 350/Electra/Machismo
- Manufacturer: Royal Enfield Motors, India
- Production: 1995–1997
- Successor: Royal Enfield Bullet 350/Electra 4s/Electra 5s/Machismo 500
- Engine: 346 cc single cylinder cast-iron or lean-burn, OHV

Under the newly appointed CEO of Enfield India, Siddhartha Lal, Eicher undertook major investment in the ailing firm. This was started with a lawsuit to secure the trademark and intellectual property rights of the defunct British Royal Enfield, in the hands of the Holder family since the British Royal Enfield's bankruptcy proceedings in 1970. After winning a trademark lawsuit, the company name was changed to Royal Enfield Motors. Many management and production changes were made, with the production process being streamlined and excess capacity redistributed. Without the large-scale Army/Law Enforcement orders to bail the company out, there was only the individual sales route in which the company had to perform if it were to survive at all. The company also faced the difficult task of catering to a very diverse market. To preserve the Bullet's nature and reputation as a classic British bike, as the Raja Gaadi, and to attract youngsters away from the newly appeared performance motorcycle market, the Bullet marque was split up into two. The Bullet Standard 350 featured all the increased manufacturing quality and reliability but was maintained in the traditional 'Bullet' look, available only in black. A new model, available in more colours and chrome accents, CDI electronic ignition, and gas-charged shock absorbers - but with the same engine and gearbox as the Standard - was launched. This model was called the 'Bullet Electra'. A major addition with the Electra was the Electric Start, which resulted in a bulkier engine package, and which was not without mechanical and reliability complications. The Electra 350 went on to become the best-selling Royal Enfield model, accounting for around half the company's sales.

Alongside these developments, Austrian engine firm AVL was contracted to produce an all-alloy engine suitable as a drop-in replacement for the cast-iron block original engine (with a design dating from 1955). The first bike with this engine was launched as the Bullet Machismo 350. This engine did not sell well in the Indian market; many prospective buyers were surveyed as saying that it didn't sound the same as the old engine, lacking the 'thump' noise of its predecessor. The engine did succeed in the Thunderbird model, a chopper style cruiser from Royal Enfield Motors. Also seen was the introduction of a disc-brake on the front wheel as a factory option domestically in India and standard on all exported models.

=== 1997–2007 ===
Royal Enfield Bullet 350/Electra 4s/Electra 5s/Machismo 500
- Manufacturer: Royal Enfield Motors, India
- Production: 1997–2007
- Successor: Royal Enfield Bullet 350/Electra 4s/Electra 5s/Machismo 500/Classic
- Engine: 346 cc & 499 cc single cylinder cast-iron or lean-burn, OHV

After ever-tighter European emission specifications forced the Bullet Standard 350 to end 2007 as its last model year in the European Union. The 500s had been fitted for some time with an induction pulsed pump to draw in fresh external air and mix it into the exhaust header to convert carbon monoxide into less harmful carbon dioxide, thus lowering emissions. When existing stocks of motorcycles were all sold the British-design engine Bullet became no longer available. All new models exclusively featured the AVL 'lean-burn' engine. The introduction of a five-speed, left foot change gearbox meant that Royal Enfield could 'fix' one of the long-standing quirks of the Bullet design; the original foot-brake is on the left-side while the gearchange is on the right (as was the custom with British bikes). Accordingly, the Bullet Machismo 350 was equipped with this left foot change gearbox and a big hit in the foreign markets as it was rich in design and the first chrome model on an Enfield. However, the 'left-shift' gear change provoked a backlash from Indian Bullet customers, forcing the company to not only continue the Bullet Standard with the traditional system but even on the Electra, it was offered only as an option, leading to the Electra four-speed (traditional) and Electra five-speed (left-shift) variants. Sales figures indicated that Indian Bullet customers had shunned the new gearbox, foregoing even the attraction of five-speed transmission to keep the gearshift traditional. However, it became standard fitment on all exported models. New developments included the addition of electric start as an option on some models, while standard on others. In 2007 and 2008, a limited edition, heavily accessorised 500cc lean-burn Machismo 350 and 500 was produced where the motorcycle features 20.85 Nm of torque at 3000 rpm, unique 19 -inch wheels, 280 mm front disc brake & the same engine chassis configuration being exported to Europe, USA & Australia. The Machismo 350 and 500 were discontinued due to a lot of internal noise in the engine.

=== Since 2007 ===
Royal Enfield Bullet 350/Bullet 500/Electra 4s/Electra 5s/Machismo 500
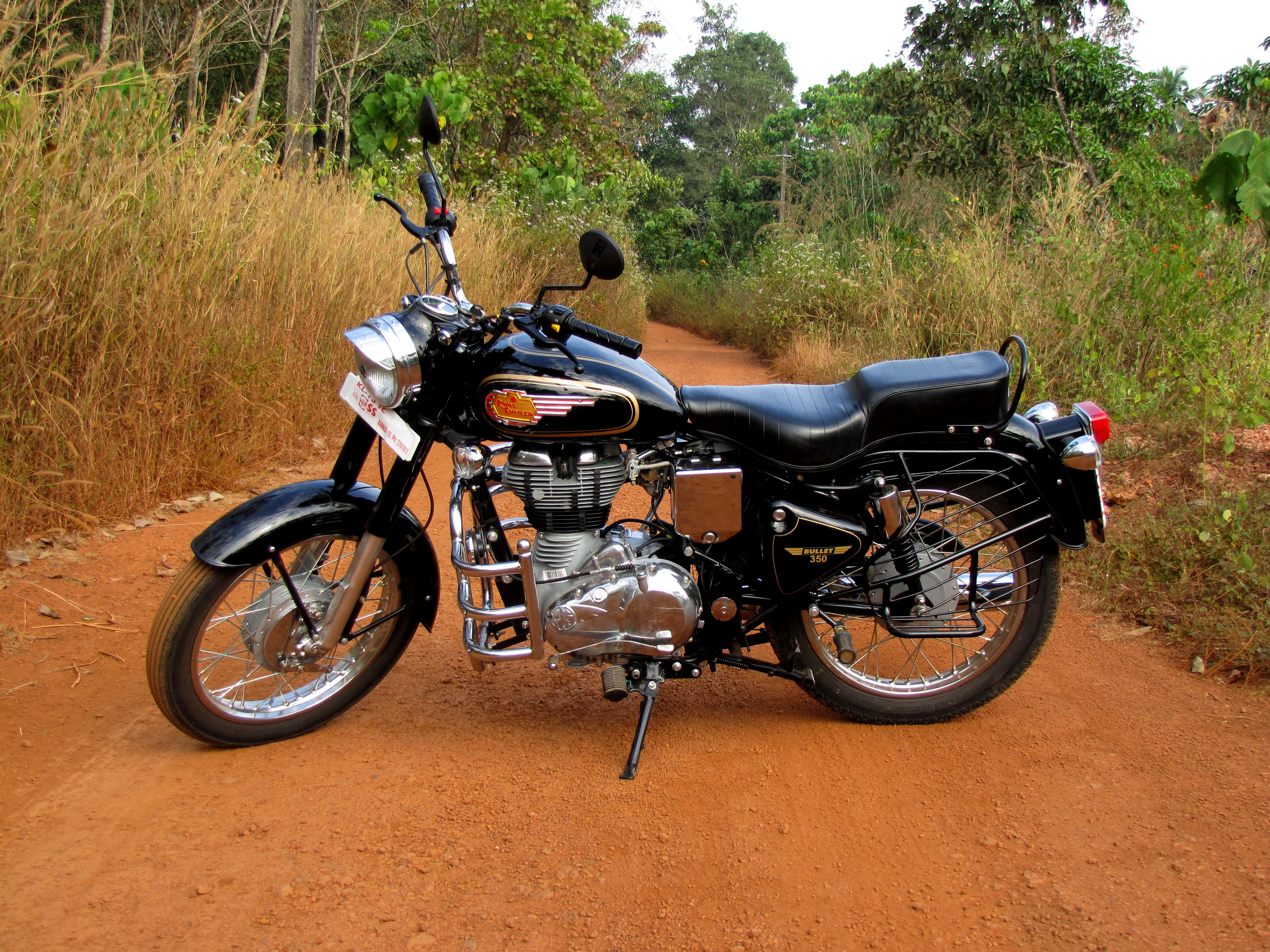
- Manufacturer: Royal Enfield Motors, India
- Production: 2007–present
- Engine: 346 cc, 499 cc & 500 cc single cylinder cast-iron, lean-burn (AVL), or UCE, OHV

As a result of work spanning several years, a new set of engines was introduced. These were the unit construction engines (UCE). The 350 cc UCE found use in the domestic model Thunderbird TwinSpark in a configuration with two sparkplugs per cylinder, with an integrated 5-speed left-shift gearbox. It has not been featured on any of the Bullet models, domestic or otherwise. By 2011, the old cast-iron engine had been completely phased out, including in the Standard 350 model. Now all Royal Enfield bikes are only available with the all-aluminium UC engine.

The 500 cc UCE features fuel injection system, and has greater power than any Royal Enfield 500 cc motor. The 500 cc UCE, with an integrated five-speed gearbox, powers the current Bullet Classic model. Starting in 2009, this engine was available only in the EU to satisfy emissions regulations, but as of 2010 it is available in the United States under two frame models, the Bullet Classic C5, or the Bullet G5, which looks similar and shares paneling with the earlier AVL Electra models. In 2011 a third export model, the B5, was introduced combining the newer 500 cc UCE engine with the traditional Indian domestic tank and frame.

In 2017 Royal Enfield equipped Bullet 500 models with Euro 4 compliance which included ABS brakes for front and rear and a better emission control system.

=== Since 2020 ===
Royal Enfield has officially confirmed that they will cease production of their 500cc engine. The majority of their sales comes from the 350cc models and the demand for the 500cc models started to decline in the Indian markets especially after the introduction of the 650 twins. It is to be discontinued in India from March 31 since the Bharat Stage VI emission norms will make them unviable. The company will upgrade its line up of 350cc motorcycles instead for Indian markets and promote its 650cc motorcycles as its primary export drivers.

In 2022, the BS6 Bullet 350 starts at an ex-showroom price of ₹1.27 lakh (US$1,300) in India.

=== Since 2023 ===
The Next Generation Bullet 350 launched on September 1, 2023. It has a retro style and is priced at ₹1.74 lakh (US$2,090) in India. In January 2024 Royal Enfield Bullet 350 was launched in two new colors- Military Silver Black and Military Silver Red.

== Custom models ==
Swiss motorcycle tuner and Royal Enfield distributor Fritz W. Egli made a custom Bullet using Egli's central tube frame constructed from nickel-plated chromium-molybdenum steel, and a longer stroke crankshaft (105 mm) engine with special main bearings, dry clutch, timing belt primary drive, and 36 mm Keihin flat-slide carburettors.

Other custom versions of the Bullet are the Musket, made in Ohio, and the Australian designed Carberry.

== See also ==
- Madras Bulls
