= List of Royal Enfield motorcycles =

Released bike list of Royal Enfield

This is a list of motorcycles produced under the Royal Enfield brand by the defunct original company, The Enfield Cycle Company Limited of Redditch, UK, and later users of the name, including the current user of the brand name, Royal Enfield of Chennai, India.

== Pre-WWI models ==
Model	Engine	Years	Notes
Quadricycle		1898	Prototype. Production of De Dion powered tricycles and quadricycles started in 1899.
First Motorcycle	MAG or JAP	1901	Used Swiss MAG or British J.A.P. engine
Model 150	Motosacoche	1910	2 1/4 hp (297cc) side valve, single speed, belt drive
Model 160	Motosacoche	1911	2 3/4 hp (344cc) side valve, 2 speed Enfield gear, chain drive. Optional cush drive
Model 180	JAP 770 cc	1912	With V-twin side valve 6 hp engine, 2 speed gear, cush drive, chain drive
Prototype	Enfield 344cc	1912	Enfield's first home produced V engine. 2 3/4 hp Overhead inlet/side ex valve
Model 140	Enfield 425cc	1913	3 hp V-twin developed from prototype
Model 200	Enfield 225cc	1915	2 stroke lightweight engine

== Inter-war models ==
Model	Engine	Years	Notes
8 hp	Vickers	1921	Wolseley side valve V engine 8 hp
Model 350	350cc	1924	Side valve JAP single
Model 351	350cc	1924	Overhead valve JAP single
Model 355 Sport	350cc	1929	Overhead valve two port
Model A	225 cc	1930	Two-stroke single
Model B	225 cc	1930	Side-valve single
Model C, F, G	346 cc	1930	Side-valve single
Model CO	346 cc	1930	Overhead-valve single
Model D, H, HA	488 cc	1930	Side-valve single
Model E, J, JA	488 cc	1930	Overhead-valve single
Model K	976 cc	1930	Side-valve V- twin
Bullet models		1933	Range of 250, 350 and 500 specially tuned high compression engines introduced
Model KX	1,140 cc	1937	Side-valve V- twin

== WWII models ==
Model	Engine	Years	Notes
WD/RE	125 cc		Known as the "Flying Flea". Two-stroke single based on the DKW RT 125. Used extensively in WW2 to jump with parachutes.
WD/D	246 cc		Side-valve single Widely used for message delivery.
WD/C	346 cc		Side-valve single. Based on the pre-war 350 cc side-valve bike, this model was supplied in large numbers to various military services and countries around the world, from 1939 to 1941. Post-war, many reconditioned bikes appeared on the civilian market.
WD/CO	346 cc		Overhead-valve single A request by the Army to Royal Enfields for more power saw the overhead Model WD/CO appear, to replace the WD/C Model. This model was supplied in very large numbers 1941–44 to many services and countries around the world. Post-war, many reconditioned bikes appeared on the civilian market.
WD/G	346 cc		Overhead-valve single Supplied in small numbers.
WD/L	570 cc		Side-valve single Supplied in small numbers.
WD/J2	499 cc		Overhead-valve single Supplied in small numbers.

== Post-WWII models ==
Model	Engine	Years	Notes
Royal Enfield Model CO 350	350 cc ohv single	1946–1947	A rigid-framed girder-fork wartime model (WD/CO), put back into production briefly post-war to fill a need for transport and all the machinery and a lot of parts were still available for this model.
model RE and RE2	125 cc two stroke single	1946–1953	A follow-up on the wartime model WD/RE, better known as the flying flea. Starting with rigid-framed girder-fork it got telescopes in 1950.
Ensign	148 cc two stroke single	1953–1959	A follow-up on the RE2, with plunger-frame and larger engine.
Royal Enfield Model G 350	350 cc ohv single	1946–1954	A rigid framed model with the new telescopic front fork, as modest priced basic transport it sold well.
Royal Enfield Model J 500	500 cc ohv single	1946–1947	A rigid framed telescopic fork model, it offered a bigger engine than the almost identical looking Model G 350 cc.
Royal Enfield Model J2 500	500 cc ohv single twin port	1947–1954	A rigid framed telescopic fork model, it offered a flashy twinport exhaust system - twin exhaust pipes one each side of the bike.
500 Twin	500 cc OHV twin	1948-1958	The first post-war twin cylinder in a swingarm frame with telescopic forks. It was simply called '500 Twin' and most non-engine parts were shared with the new Bullet. Its factory photograph is often mistakenly called 'Bullet' on various websites.
Bullet 350	350 cc single	1948–1960	ISDT winner, and very widely used roadbike with swingarm rear suspension. Amongst the first to be so equipped. (See main article Royal Enfield Bullet.)
Bullet 500	500 cc single	1953–1962	(See main article Royal Enfield Bullet.)
Clipper	250 cc single	1956–1962	A unit construction 248 cc OHV engine with 13 bhp. Its purpose was a commuter bike.
Clipper Sports	250 cc single	1959–1967	A unit construction 248 cc OHV engine with 17 bhp. A bit more sporty as the standard Crusader.
Continental	250 cc single	1963–1966	A unit construction 248 cc OHV engine with 20 bhp. Created as the factory made cafe-racer.
Continental GT	250 cc single	1965–1968	A unit construction 248 cc OHV engine with 20 bhp. Created as the factory made cafe-racer.
Fury	500 cc/600 cc single	1958–1963	Competition model built for US flat track competition market; it was essentially a Bullet 500 bottom end with a substantially larger cylinder head with integrated rocker box, larger ports and valves. The bike was nicknamed "Big Head". Came with 1.5" Amal GP carburetor and Lucas Racing Magneto. Only 193 units were produced. One 600 cc prototype was made and sold according to factory records. A "Big Head" bullet was sold in the UK concurrently for the civilian market with a smaller inlet valve and Amal Monobloc carburetor.
Meteor Minor	500 cc twin	1958–1963	Follow up of the 500 Twin. Parallel twin housed in the same swing arm frame as the singles. 1960 onwards as Sports and de Luxe model.
Super Meteor	700 cc twin	1953–1962	40 bhp touring model
Constellation	700 cc twin	1958-1963	Originally with 52 bhp with "R" cams and single TT carburetor in 1958 and 1959 and twin carbs for 1960 to 1962; Weak bottom end proved unreliable and was progressively detuned to 40 bhp to make it more reliable. Unique scissor-action clutch operation. In 1961 and 1962 a "bathtub" model with a unique fiberglass rear end was also sold.
700 Interceptor	700 cc twin	1960	Only 163 units were ever made; all were exported to North America. Engine code starts with VAX.
750 Interceptor	736 cc twin	1962–1970	Series 1, Series 1A, Series 2 (with wet sump lubrication)

== Indian-branded Royal Enfields (sold in USA from 1955 to 1960) ==
Indian branded motorcycles included:

Model	Engine	Years	Notes
Indian Chief	700 cc twin	1958–1961	Longest wheelbase of any post-war Royal Enfield; single Monobloc carburetor; distributor ignition; 16" wheels; Albion heavy-duty gearbox with AM prefix. Earlier bikes had Super Meteor spec Engine, but later bikes came with Constellation spec engine. This is the only bike that was not replaced with an AMC model when AMC took over Indian in 1960.
Indian Trailblazer	700 cc twin	1955–1959	19" wheels. Single carburetor and dual carburetor, valanced fenders. Engine had Super Meteor spec.
Apache	700 cc twin	1957–1959	Constellation spec engine. Single TT carburetor on most models. Slim alloy fenders. Quick detach headlights. Sportiest of all Enfield based Indians.
Tomahawk	500 cc twin	1955–1959	19" wheels, Meteor Minor engine specs. Early casquette debuted in 1954. Earlier bikes had the pre-1955 frame.
Woodsman	500 cc single	1955–1959	Same as 500 cc Bullet with high pipes and a 5" speedometer. Sold as a competition bike.
Westerner	500 cc single	1957–1958	Competition version of the Woodsman with low open pipes, Amal TT carburetor and racing magneto, no lights and speedometer. Very few were made.
Patrol Car	346 cc single	1957–1959	3-speed gearbox with provision for a reverse gear. Hand shifter. Some models had 16-inch tires all around and some others had 19-inch front and 16-inch rear.
Fire Arrow & Hounds Arrow	248 cc single	1957–1959	Earlier models were semi-unit Clipper engine; later models had 248 cc unit single engine.
Lance Arrow	148 cc single	1957–1959	Two-stroke engine. Most were painted yellow from the factory. Not very many were imported.

== Enfield India Ltd. (1955 onwards) ==
Enfield India was renamed to Royal Enfield Motors in 1995.

Model	Engine	Years	Notes
Ensign	150 cc	1956–1962	150 cc two-stroke engine
Sherpa/Crusader	175 cc	1963–1980	Motorcycle with a two-stroke 175 cc Villiers engine. Sherpa was rechristened Crusader after a restyling job in 1970.
Mini Bullet	200 cc	1980–1983	Motorcycle with an enlarged 200 cc Crusader engine. It was a favorite amongst racing enthusiasts in India.
Fantabulus	175 cc	1962–197?	Scooter with a two-stroke 173 cc Villiers engine and heel/toe gearshift. First Indian made bi-wheeler to have an electric starter. It used a Dynastart system.
Fury	163 cc	1988-1995	It was a licensed copy of the Zundapp KS 175. It was the first motorcycle in India to sport a disc brake. Wheels were cast alloy and front end sported 35 mm Paioli forks. Later model was called Grand Prix. Rare DW175 model came with drum brakes, both front and back.
Explorer	50 cc	1985–1994	Air-cooled version of the Zundapp KS50 with 3-speed gearbox
Silver Plus	50 cc	1985–1994	Step thru moped with kick start and hand gear shift. Based on Zundapp ZS/ZX 50 models.
MOFA	22 cc	198?–199?	Mini moped designed by Morbidelli of Italy to manufacture in India. The 22 cc two-stroke engine had a centrifugal clutch and the fuel was carried in the frame down tube.
Lightning 535	535 cc	1997-2003	Cruiser style motorcycle with 535 cc (87 mm bore) based on Fritz Egli tuned Bullets. Hi-volume oil pumps, 4-speed gearbox and two tone paint. Indian Market only model. Also available with electric start. A rare 350 cc model called CityBike was also sold for some time, which has an electric start.
Diesel/Taurus	325 cc	1980–2001	The only diesel motorcycle to enter mass production, with a 325 cc 6.5 bhp Lombardini diesel engine, and 3.5 hp version, the gearbox was reinforced to withstand increased torque associated with a diesel engine. The Taurus came with heavy-duty luggage rack for vending jobs and economy up to 72 kmpl, but the top speed was limited to roughly 80 km/h by its lack of power.
Machismo	346 cc/499 cc	1999-2009	Introduced with the classic 350 cc Bullet engine with 4-speed gearbox; it later attained the AVL all Aluminium Lean Burn Engine and eventually a 5-speed gearbox, which has an electric start. Later, LB500 model came with the 500 cc AVL lean burn engine. Sheet metal and trim had slight variations depending on the year. Indian market only model.
Bullet 350	346 cc	1955–present	Originally started manufacturing in 1955 with 350 cc iron-barrel engine and 4-speed Albion gearbox. Bullet Continental sold in USA in 1990s with left shift 4-speed gearbox. Attained the Unit Construction Engine in May 2010. Many submodels introduced during its lifespan like Bullet Superstar. In 2010, the classic iron-barrel engine was replaced with the 350 cc UCE engine. Bullet 350 is the cheapest of all the Royal Enfield models and is devoid of an electric starter, front disc brake(the same has been added in 2019), and gas filled shocks. Only available in black with Gold Pinstripes. After the Royal Enfield Bullet Electra discontinued Royal Enfield also launched Bullet 350 ES which has Electric Start, it is the predecessor of Electra.
Bullet 500	499 cc	1990–2020	Historically sold worldwide in different variations with both 4-speed and 5-speed gearboxes (The 5-speed iron-barrel engine model was sold under the name Sixty-5). In 2009 iron-barrel engine production came to an end but the B5 export model, with a fuel-injected UCE engine, is sold as the Bullet 500 in almost all international markets. It is currently available in forest green and glossy black colour schemes, and features unique silver petrol tank decorations.
Electra	346/499 cc	1995-2016	Indian market only model with 346 cc classic engine. 4-speed or 5-speed gearbox. Later models with electric start and TCI ignition. Attained the UCE engine in 2010 and is now known as Electra Twinspark. Was available on the export market with a classic carburettor-equipped 500cc engine as the Electra X prior to Euro-4 legislation halting its production in 2009.
Electra X	499 cc	2005-2019	Export-only model with 500 cc AVL lean-burning engine and 5-speed gearbox. Equipped with the Euro-4 compliant UCE engine in 2009. A chrome edition was available from 2010 to 2013, called the G5 Deluxe, which was equipped with fuel injection and a front disc brake. Previously available in several specifications, such as a flat-track style version of the Electra X, sold exclusively in the UK by importer Watsonian Squire between 2011 and 2013. The G5 was sold alongside the C5 Chrome, and has been largely superseded by the B5, often referred to as the "Bullet 500" in the export market.
Thunderbird 350	346 cc	2002–2020	Cruiser style motorcycle that was a big hit to command almost half the domestic sales. Attained Euro-4 compliant Unit Construction Engine(UCE) in 2008 and was rechristened Thunderbird Twinspark. A highway cruiser from Royal Enfield. In 2013, it underwent a major facelift introducing digital speedometer and fuel gauge along with projector headlamps. The motorcycle musters a horse power of 19.8 hp at 5,250 rpm and a torque of 28 Nm at 4000 rpm. Indian Market only model.
Classic 500	499 cc	2010–2020	With Euro-4 compliant Unit Construction engine. Both Indian and International markets. Sold under the model name C5 in most International markets. Features include fuel injection, solo seat and 18-inch rear wheel. Several limited edition and special colour schemes have been available for this model at various times, notably the current-model C5 Chrome, military tan and green, as well as limited-edition Squadron camouflage paint schemes and end of production Classic 500 Tribute Black (1000 units worldwide).
Classic 350	346 cc	2009–present	Recently made available in the export market with a Euro-4 compliant Unit Construction engine. Equipped with UCAL\BS29 carburettor and twinspark ignition. Shares styling with the Classic 500 series of motorbikes.
Thunderbird 500	499 cc	2013–2020	500 cc variant of the Thunderbird. Fuel injection, digital console, electronic fuel gauge, projector headlamps and 18-inch wheels.
Thunderbird 350	346 cc	2013–2020	350 cc variant of the Thunderbird. Digital console, electronic fuel gauge, projector headlamps and 18-inch wheels.
Continental GT	535 cc	2013-2018	Features include a fuel-injected 500cc unit-construction engine which has been redesigned and bored out to 535cc, and cafe racer styling inspired by the historic 250cc Royal Enfield Continental, which was produced between 1963 and 1968. Equipped with Brembo 300 mm front disc brake and Pirelli Sports Demon tyres in factory configuration. The double cradle frame developed by Harris Performance UK, and Paioli gas-charged shock absorbers with adjustable preload contribute to a more stable ride. Features a semi-digital console and electronic fuel gauge.
Himalayan	411 cc and 452 cc	2016–Present	Entry level dual-purpose adventure bike. An all-new engine, 411 cc, referred to as the long-stroke "LS410". 5-speed constant mesh transmission. Front/rear disc brakes. The Second generation Himalayan was launched in India with 452cc FI Engine
Signals 350	350cc	2018–present	First motorbike made with Anti-Lock Braking System (ABS) as standard
Thunderbird 350x	349cc	2018-2020	350 cc variant of Thunderbird x. Digital console, electronic fuel gauge, projector headlamps and tubeless wheels.
Thunderbird 500x	500cc	2018-2020	500cc variant of Thunderbird x. Digital console, electronic fuel gauge, projector headlamps and tubeless wheels.
Interceptor 650	648cc	2018–present	Retro-inspired twin, based on a new Harris Performance designed frame and an all-new 270° parallel twin air-&-oil-cooled SOHC engine.
Continental GT 650	648cc	2018–present	Cafe racer-inspired version of the Interceptor 650, sharing the same engine, frame and mechanicals.
Meteor 350	349cc	2020–present	Named after 1952 Super Meteor 700.
Himalayan Scram 411	411cc	2022–2025	BS6 model of the earlier released Himalayan (2016) catching up to new emission rules in India
Hunter 350	349cc	2022–present	Neo-Retro Roadster that is the lightest bike in Royal Enfield's current portfolio.It is also the smallest bike height wise in the same power range.
Super Meteor 650	648cc	2022–present	Combining the 650 parallel twin engine with a cruiser style chassis, it shares its name from the 1952 Royal Enfield Super Meteor 700.
Shotgun 650	648cc	2024–present	Factory custom bobber with 650cc inline 2 cylinder engine
Guerrilla 450	452cc	2024–present	Plastic Parts made roadster bike Based on Himalayan 450
Interceptor Bear 650	648cc	2024–present	Scrambler bike Based on Interceptor 650
Goan Classic 350	349cc	2024–present	Bobber Version of the Classic 350 with 349cc Single cylinder engine
Royal Enfield Scram 440	443cc	2025–present	Scrambler motorcycle with first ever 443cc single cylinder engine. It Replaced Scram 411.
Classic 650	649cc	2025–present	650 cc version of Royal Enfield Classic series.

== See also ==
- List of AMC motorcycles
- List of Ariel motorcycles
- List of BSA motorcycles
- List of Douglas motorcycles
- List of Norton motorcycles
- List of Triumph motorcycles
- List of Velocette motorcycles
- List of Vincent motorcycles
