= Royal Enfield Meteor =

Meteor
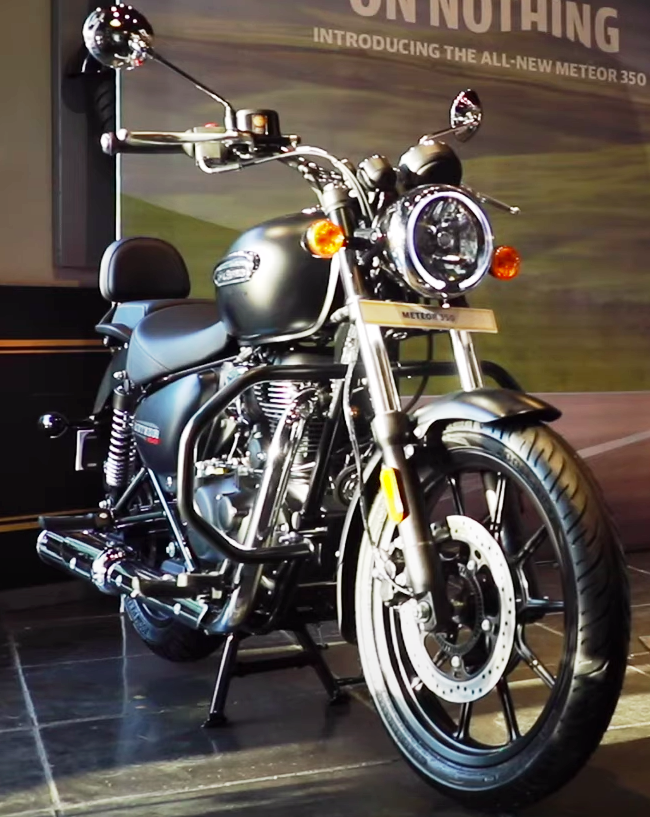
- Manufacturer: Royal Enfield
- Parent company: Eicher Motors
- Production: 2020 - present
- Predecessor: Royal Enfield Thunderbird
- Class: Cruiser
- Engine: 349 cc (21.3 cu in) air-cooled single cylinder 4-stroke, SOHC, Fuel Injection
- Bore / stroke: 72 mm × 85.8 mm (2.83 in × 3.38 in)
- Power: 20 bhp @ 6100 rpm
- Torque: 27 Nm @ 4000 rpm
- Transmission: 5-speed, manual
- Suspension: Front – telescopic fork; rear – twin-tube shock absorbers
- Brakes: Front – 300 mm disc with 2-piston floating caliper; rear – 270 mm disc with single piston floating caliper
- Weight: 191 kg (421 lb) (wet)
- Fuel capacity: 15 L (3.3 imp gal; 4.0 US gal)

The Royal Enfield Meteor is an Indian cruiser-style motorcycle manufactured by Royal Enfield in India. The model was developed by engineers based at Royal Enfield's two state-of-the-art technical centres, in Chennai. The Meteor is a direct replacement to Thunderbird 350X.

== Design ==
=== Engine ===
Royal Enfield developed the Meteor codenamed JD1. The 349cc long-stroke single-cylinder engine is now air and oil-cooled and the traditional pushrods were replaced by an overhead cam. The engine produces 20 horsepower at 6,100rpm and 27Nm of torque at 4,000rpm and is paired to a five-speed constant mesh transmission. The bike has a power-to-weight ratio of 105.75 hp/tonne. The engine design also includes a balancer shaft to repress the vibrations. The Royal Enfield Meteor 350 has a fuel consumption of around 35 km/l.

The Royal Enfield Super Meteor released in 2022 boasts very much the same design, and is the first spin-off of the firm's 650 twin range. This cruiser motorcycle is available in standard or Touring trim.

=== Frame and chassis ===
The Meteor comes with a twin-tube spine frame, as opposed to the single downtube frame, which most of its contemporaries in the company's line-up have. The suspension is telescopic in front while in the rear is twin-tube emulsion shock absorbers. Front forks are 41mm with 130mm travel and the rear suspension has six-step adjustable preload.

The stock tires of the bike are 100/90-19 inch at front and 140/70-17 inch at the rear. The motorcycle has a 300 mm disc with a dual-piston floating caliper at the front and a 270 mm single-piston floating caliper disc at rear.

The bike also features an all-new semi-digital instrument cluster and a Tripper navigation system screen in a separate pod.

The Super Meteor 650 shares a resemblance to its younger counterpart, the Meteor 350, but with a more muscular appearance. It features a wide and low-slung seat, offering a relaxed riding position ideal for long-distance journeys. The cruiser aesthetics are enhanced by its teardrop-shaped fuel tank, scooped seat, and robust fenders.

== 2022 Update ==
Three new colors are available.

In July 2022, it starts at an ex-showroom price of ₹205,844 (US$2,100) in India. In Germany, it starts at €4,390 (US$5,192.05).

== 2023 Update ==
In October 2023, Royal Enfield launched the Aurora variant of the Meteor 350. Mechanically, the Aurora is identical to the other variants. Its unique features include spoke wheels, three new color schemes, an exclusive chrome engine, and other retro-inspired elements.

== See also ==
- List of Royal Enfield motorcycles
- Royal Enfield
- Royal Enfield Super Meteor
