= Tripper navigation system =

Navigation system on Royal Enfield motorcycles

Tripper is a Google Maps–based navigation system on motorcycles from Royal Enfield, including the Himalayan, the Meteor, and the Interceptor 650.

In May 2022 the Tripper system was removed as standard equipment and made optional, in response to the global semiconductor shortage.
