= Royal Enfield WD/RE =

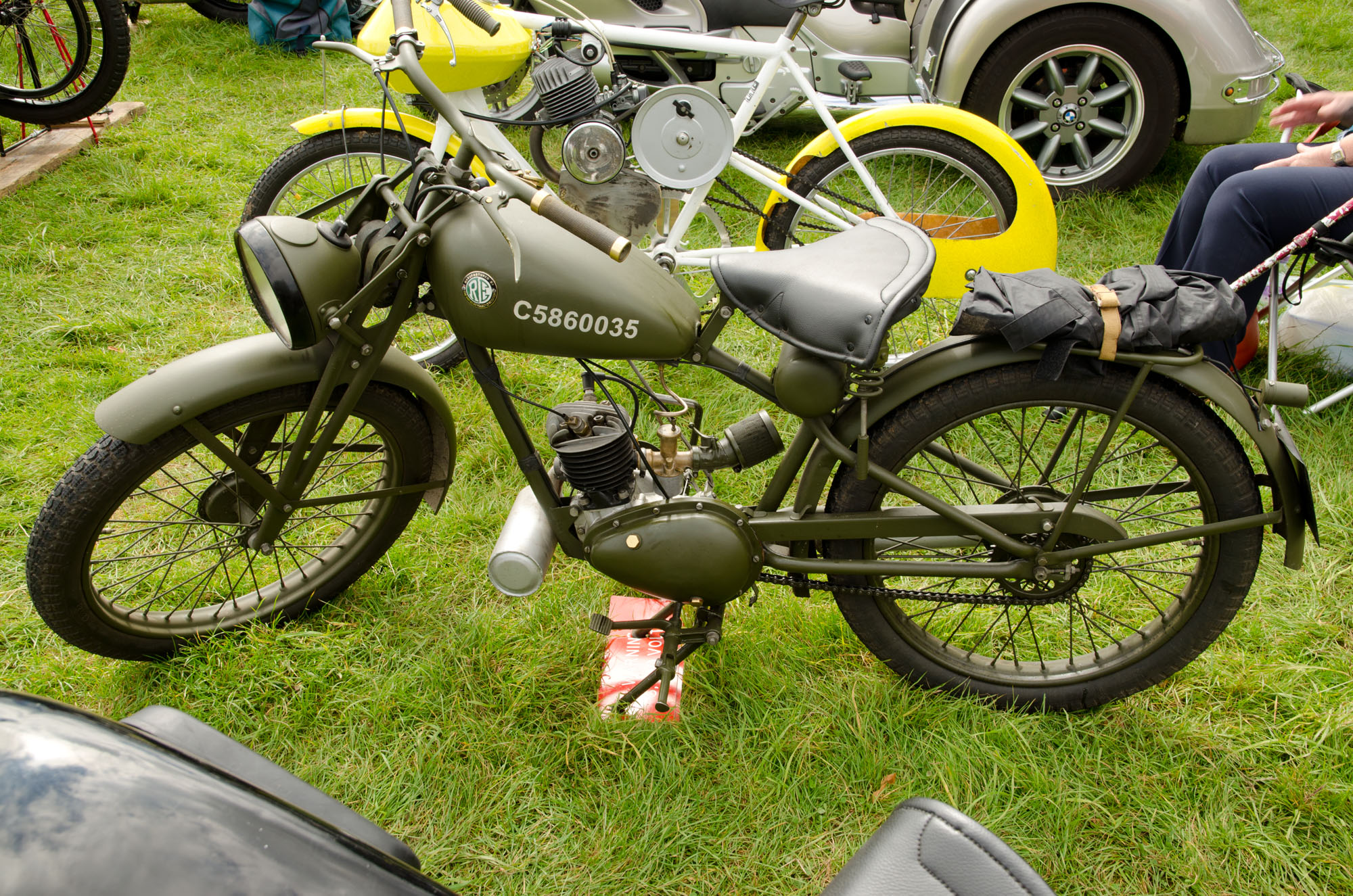
- 1943 WD/RE
- Manufacturer: Royal Enfield
- Also called: Flying Flea
- Production: 1942–1945
- Predecessor: RE 125
- Successor: RE 125
- Class: Military
- Engine: 126 cc air-cooled two stroke single
- Top speed: 45 mph (72 km/h)
- Power: 3.5 hp @ 4,500
- Transmission: three-speed, chain final drive
- Suspension: fixed
- Brakes: drum
- Dimensions: L: 75 in (190 cm); W: 26 in (66 cm)
- Weight: 130 lb (59 kg) (wet)
- Fuel consumption: 130 mpg (2.1L/100km)
- Related: RT 100

The Royal Enfield WD/RE known as the "Flying Flea" was a lightweight British motorcycle developed by Royal Enfield for the British War Office (the WD came from War Department) as a means of transport that could be dropped by parachute or carried in gliders, to quickly carry messages and signals between airborne and assault troops where radio communications were not in place.

== Development ==
In 1938, the German government stopped the Dutch importer of the DKW RT 100 motorcycle, RS Stokvis and Sons, from receiving any more supplies, because Stokvis was Jewish. Stokvis asked Royal Enfield to produce a similar motorcycle. Royal Enfield's replacement for the RT100 was designed by Ted Pardoe, who enlarged the engine to 125cc. Two prototypes under the name "Royal Baby" were shown at Rotterdam in April 1939. Using a less sophisticated but increased-capacity two-stroke engine in the same frame, a few of these Model RE motorcycles were made before the outbreak of the Second World War.

As with other British motorcycle manufacturers, Royal Enfield factory production was turned over to the war effort. Military motorcycles included the WD/D 250 cc side-valve; WD/C 350 cc side-valve, the and the WD/L 570 cc side-valve; and WD/CO 350 cc overhead valve.

Early in 1942, the War Office ordered twenty WD/RE motorcycles from Royal Enfield for testing. Based on the 1939 civilian RE, the prototype had a right-hand brake and was fitted with an Amal carburettor and had a low-mounted toolbox. The trials went well and led to some modifications, including fitting a twin-box exhaust system to help silence the noisy two stroke engine, a Villiers carburettor (indicated by a "V" on the engine), raising the toolbox and fitting a folding kick-start, footrests and folding handlebars, so that it could be packed into the smallest possible space. A Miller lighting system was added, together with a sealed vent on the fuel filler to prevent spillage when the motorcycle was packed in a drop carrier. The foot brake was also relocated to the left side.

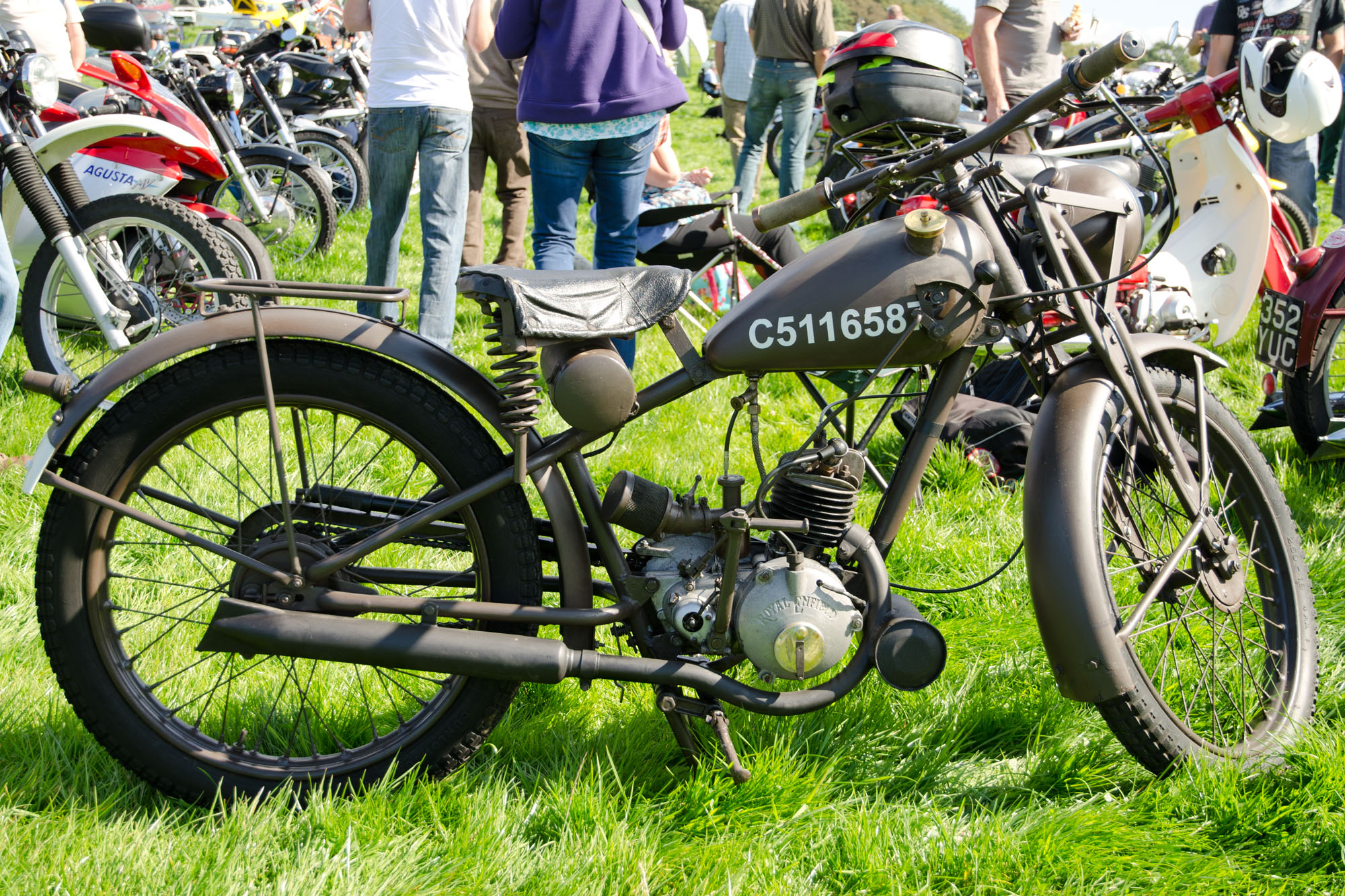
1943 WD/RE

The reason the War Office wanted such a lightweight motorcycle was to establish communications between troops who had been dropped by parachute and front line forces, who could be some distance away or out of radio contact.

The motorcycle had to be able to land without too much damage. Experiments were begun in summer 1942 to develop a protective cradle to completely encase the motorcycle. Different versions were tested by dropping them from the bomb racks of aircraft such as the Halifax and Lancaster bombers. As well as surviving the drop, the cradles also had to be easy to remove on landing. The prototypes met neither requirement, as they were too light and bent the wheels on impact. Eventually, a design that worked was developed, with heavier tubing and increased bracing. In December 1942, production began at Royal Enfield's Calton Hill factory in Edinburgh.

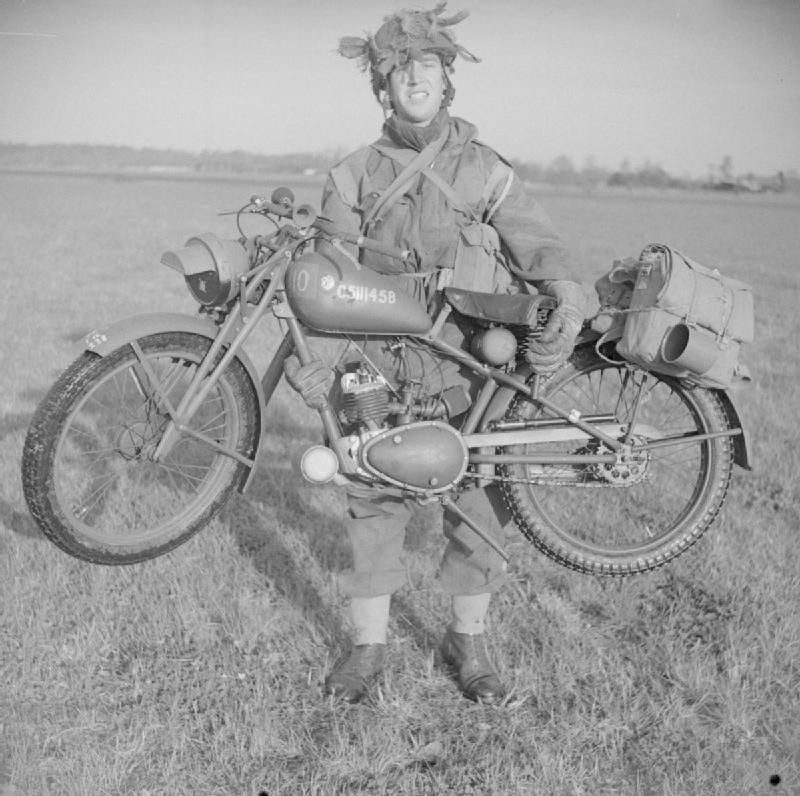
A British Army paratrooper in 1944, demonstrating the portability of the WD/RE

The first significant orders for the Royal Enfield WD/RE were placed early in 1943, but only a few were actually parachuted into the battle zone, as it was decided to load them into troop carrying gliders four at a time without the protective frames, and secured by a special harness instead. WD/RE motorcycles were also used for beach landings in 1943 and 1944, and were carried inside landing craft for communication between the beaches and the nearest front line forces.

Early production examples were fitted with a small tail light and military-issue headlamp cowl to help hide the motorcycles and riders from enemy aircraft. The WD/RE could run on any petrol, and its light weight meant that soldiers could carry it over otherwise impassable terrain.

== Post war ==
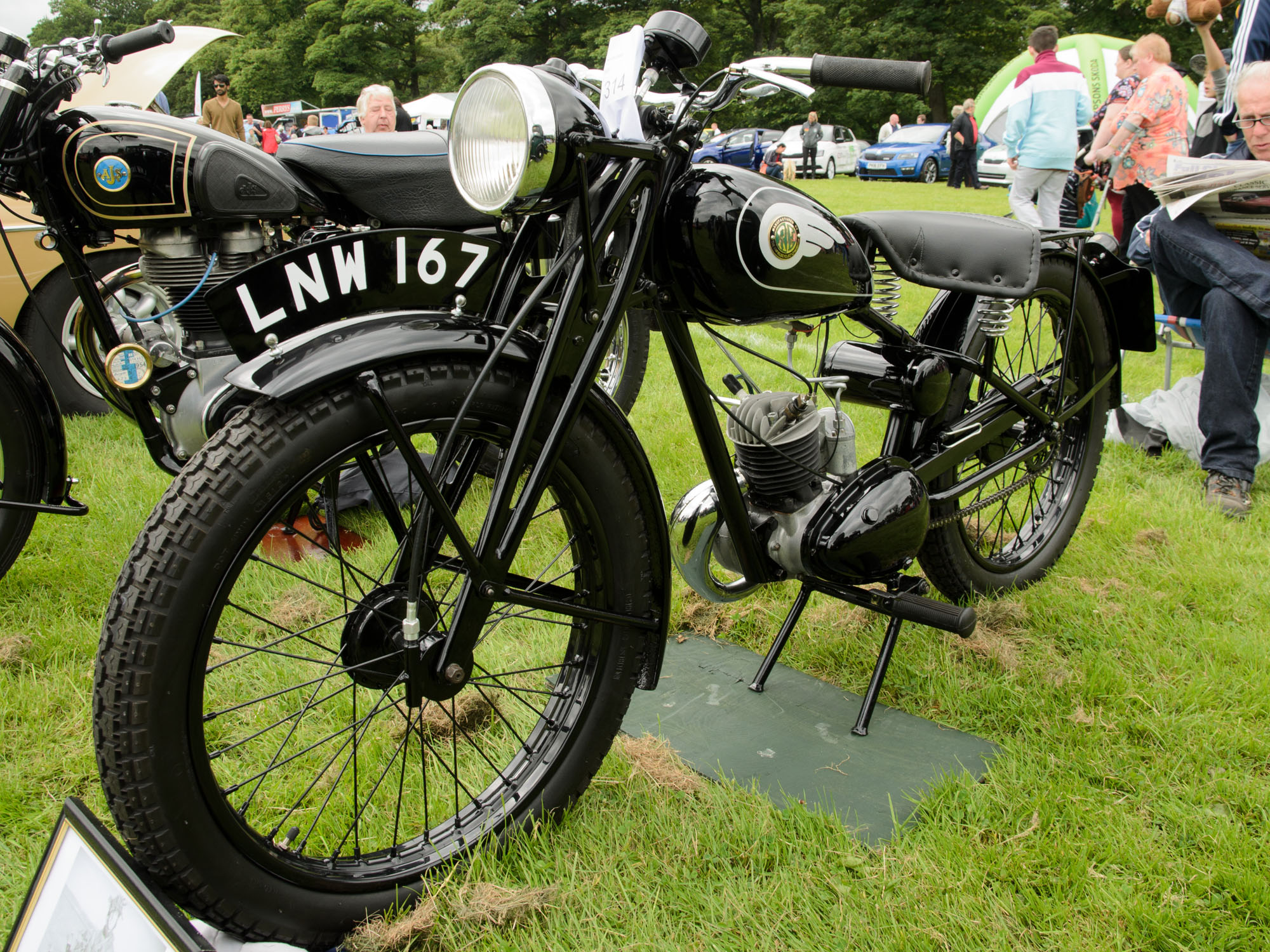
1946 civilian Royal Enfield RE

There was a huge demand for cheap and reliable transport after the war, so WD/RE's that were war surplus were stripped down and repainted for civilian use. Most of this work was done at Enfield's Bradford-on-Avon works in Wiltshire. A few military Royal Enfield WD/RE motorcycles remained in limited military use until the end of the 1940s.

Royal Enfield developed a civilian version in the post war years: the RE 125. Early examples had hand gear change and a girder front fork. In 1950, the RE was updated with foot gear change and a telescopic front fork with damped springing. In 1951 the RE2 was introduced, with a redesigned frame and engine. RE2 production ended in 1953, when the Royal Enfield Ensign superseded it.

== 21st-century Flying Flea ==
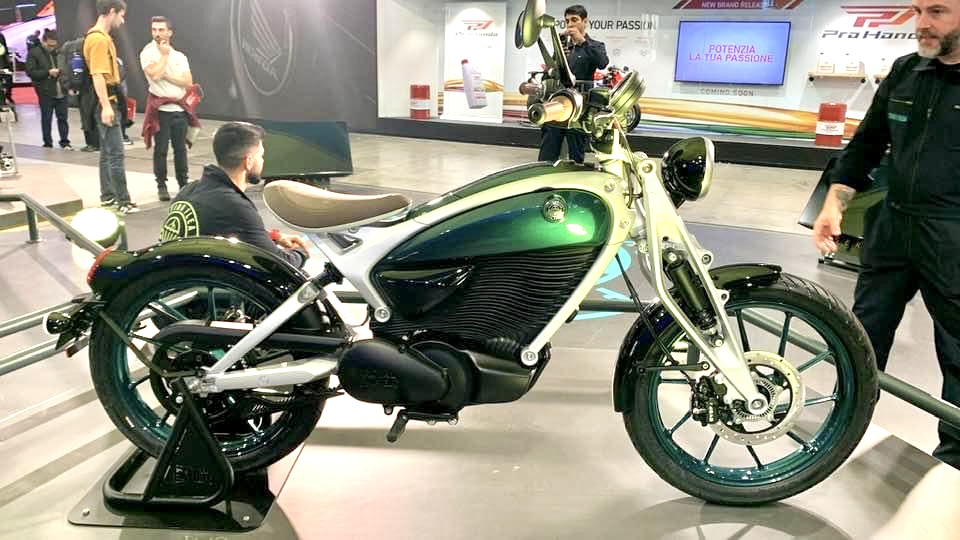
Flying Flea C6 concept motorcycle

On 11 February 2020, Eicher Motors Limited, the parent company of Royal Enfield, registered for a new trademark for "Royal Enfield Flying Flea" with UIPO, the European Union Intellectual Property Office, sparking the hope in the motorcycle community that the name would be revived with a new small displacement motorcycle.

On 4 November 2024, Royal Enfield announced that it would revive the Flying Flea name as a both a model and a brand, as a range of lightweight electric motorcycles. The first models announced were the C6 and S6.It is styled as a low-slung bobber and built on a forged aluminium frame with a girder-style fork at the front and a monoshock suspension at the rear. It shares design cues with the WD/RE. It is also outfitted with a circular headlamp, teardrop-shaped faux fuel tank, and a single circular TFT display . It features a quick removable pillion seat that converts it to a classic solo look in just a few minutes.

== See also ==
- Welbike – a compact motorcycle for SOE use, parachute dropped at Arnhem (Operation Market Garden)
- BSA Bantam – a motorcycle based on the DKW RT 125
