= Oil cooling =

Use of engine oil as a coolant

Oil cooling is the use of engine oil as a coolant, typically to remove surplus heat from an internal combustion engine. The hot engine transfers heat to the oil which then usually passes through a heat-exchanger, typically a type of radiator known as an oil cooler. The cooled oil flows back into the hot object to cool it continuously.

== Usage ==
Oil cooling is commonly used to cool high-performance motorcycle engines that are not liquid-cooled. Typically, the cylinder barrel remains air-cooled in the traditional motorcycle fashion, but the cylinder head benefits from additional cooling. As there is already an oil circulation system available for lubrication, this oil is also piped to the cylinder head and used as a liquid coolant. Compared to an oil system used solely for lubrication, oil cooling requires additional oil capacity, a greater flow rate through the oil pump, and an oil cooler (or a larger cooler than normal).

If air-cooling proves sufficient for much of the running time (such as for an aero-engine in flight, or a motorcycle in motion), then oil cooling is an ideal way to cope with those times when extra cooling is needed (such as an aero-engine taxiing before take-off, or a motorcycle in a city traffic jam). But if the engine is a racing engine that is always producing huge amounts of heat, water or liquid cooling may be preferable.

Air-cooled aviation engines may be subject to "shock cooling" when descending from cruising altitude prior to landing. During descent, very little power is needed, so the engine is throttled back and thereby develops much less heat than when maintaining altitude. While descending, the plane's airspeed rises, substantially increasing the rate of air-cooling the engine. These factors may cause the cylinder head to crack; but the adoption of oil-cooled cylinder heads significantly reduces or cancels the problem as the heads are now "oil-warmed".

In the 1980s, Suzuki used the "SACS" oil-cooling system on the GSX-R sportbikes, but later switched to water-cooling.

The Wankel engine features oil cooling in addition to liquid-cooling to successfully manage its excessive heat. This rotary engine is most famous for its application in the Mazda RX-7 and RX-8.

Lubrication is a rudimentary form of oil cooling. Some slow-turning early engines would have a "splashing spoon" beneath the big end of the connecting rod. This spoon would dip into sump oil and would hurl oil about, in the hope of cooling and lubricating the underside of the piston.

== Advantages ==
- Oil has a higher boiling point than water, so it can be used to cool items at a temperature of 100 °C or higher. However, pressurised water-cooling may also exceed 100 °C.
- Oil is an electrical insulator, thus it can be used inside of or in direct contact with electrical equipment such as in transformers.
- Oil is already present as a lubricant, so no extra coolant tanks, pumps nor radiators are required (although all of these items may need to be larger than otherwise).
- Cooling water can be corrosive to the engine and must contain a corrosion inhibitor/rust-inhibitor, whereas oil naturally helps to prevent corrosion.
- Thus, if through a gasket failure, coolant oil should enter, say, the combustion chamber or the sump, this would be a mere inconvenience; but if coolant water should similarly leak, substantial engine damage might occur.

== Disadvantages ==
- Coolant oil may be limited to cooling objects under approximately 200–300 °C, otherwise the oil may degrade and even leave ashy deposits.
- Pure water may evaporate or boil, but it cannot degrade, although it may become polluted and acidic.
- Water is generally available should coolant need to be added to the system, but oil may not be.
- Unlike water, oil may be flammable.
- The specific heat of water or water/glycol is about twice that of oil, so a given volume of water may absorb more engine heat than can the same volume of oil.
- Therefore, water may be a better coolant if an engine is permanently producing large amounts of heat, making it better for high-performance or racing engines.

== Examples of engines that are oil-cooled or partially oil cooled ==
- HKS 700E
- Wankel engine
- Suzuki GSXR 750 (1985 model)
- Suzuki FXR150
- Kubota OC95
- BMW "Oilhead" motorcycle engines
- Victory Motorcycles
- Biscúter
- Yamaha FZ25
- Royal Enfield Interceptor 650
- Pulsar F250/ N250
- Ecotec
- Citroën 2CV
- Elsbett ELKO 3.82.92T

== See also ==
- Air cooling
- Water cooling
- Full immersion cooling
