= Royal Enfield Super Meteor =

Super Meteor
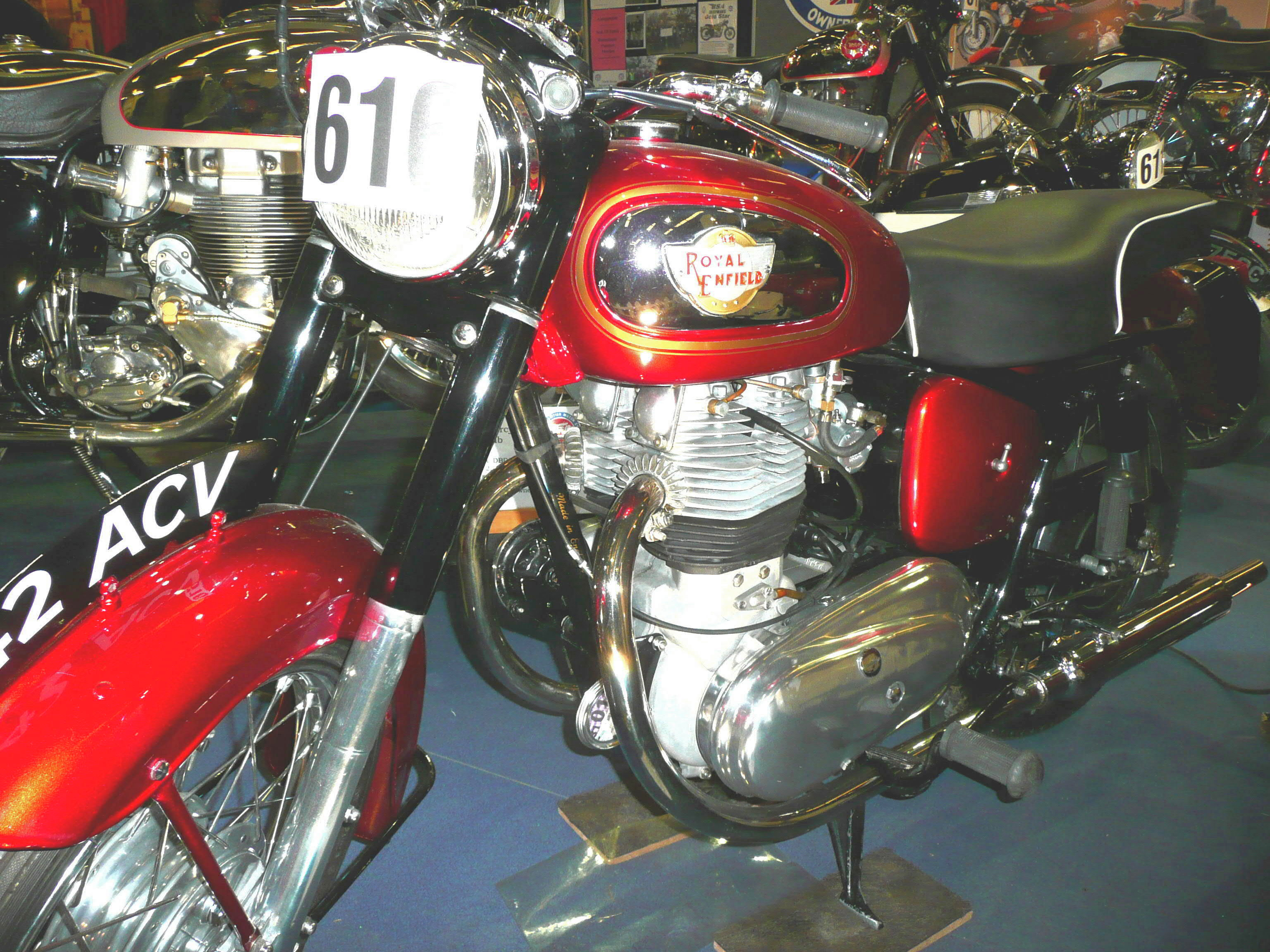
- Manufacturer: Royal Enfield
- Production: 1952–1962
- Engine: 692 cc air-cooled overhead valve parallel-twin
- Transmission: four-speed, chain final drive
- Weight: 410 pounds (190 kg) (wet)

The Super Meteor was a British motorcycle made by Royal Enfield. It was manufactured for export to the US between 1952 and 1962, when the Super Meteor was replaced by the 736 cc Royal Enfield Interceptor.

== Development ==
In 1953, the US export market led Royal Enfield to develop a 692 cc, overhead valve twin capable of 100 mph (160 km/h), which was launched as the Meteor. The engine was basically a modified 500 twin crankcase with 350 single (Bullet) pistons, valves and identical 90mm stroke length. In 1954, the Super Meteor was updated and fitted with a new cast alloy headlight nacelle (casquette) housing the speedometer, ammeter and light switch. During 1955, the dynamo and coil ignition was replaced with a Lucas magdyno. This model was replaced by the Super Meteor in 1956 that sported a brand new frame. Based on the Royal Enfield Meteor Minor 496 cc overhead valve engine, the new model had a strengthened crank and improved clutch. The frame was also strengthened to handle the increased torque. The gearbox was modified so that the gear shift lever was concentric with the kick-starter. The compression ratio was increased to 7.25:1; it was upgraded with Lucas alternator and Amal Monobloc carburettor. Modified engines, incorporating electric start, were also produced and supplied by the factory for the Berkeley B95 and B105 car models during 1959 and 1960. The Super Meteor and the sporty Constellation were replaced by the 736 cc Royal Enfield Interceptor in 1962.

== Anti-lock braking experiment ==
In 1958, a Royal Enfield Super Meteor was used by the Transport Research Laboratory to test the Maxaret anti-lock brake on motorcycles. The Maxaret works by detecting rapid decelerations of the wheel that may cause it to lock and releases and re-applies hydraulic pressure to the brake several times a second, keeping the average braking effort at the maximum that can be used by the road surface and tyre combination. The experiments demonstrated that anti-lock brakes could be of great value on motorcycles, where skidding is involved in a high proportion of accidents. Stopping distances were reduced in almost all the tests, compared with locked wheel braking, but particularly on slippery surfaces, where the improvement could be as much as 30%. Royal Enfield's Technical Director at the time, Tony Wilson-Jones, saw little future in the system and it was not put into production by the company.

== 2023 Model ==
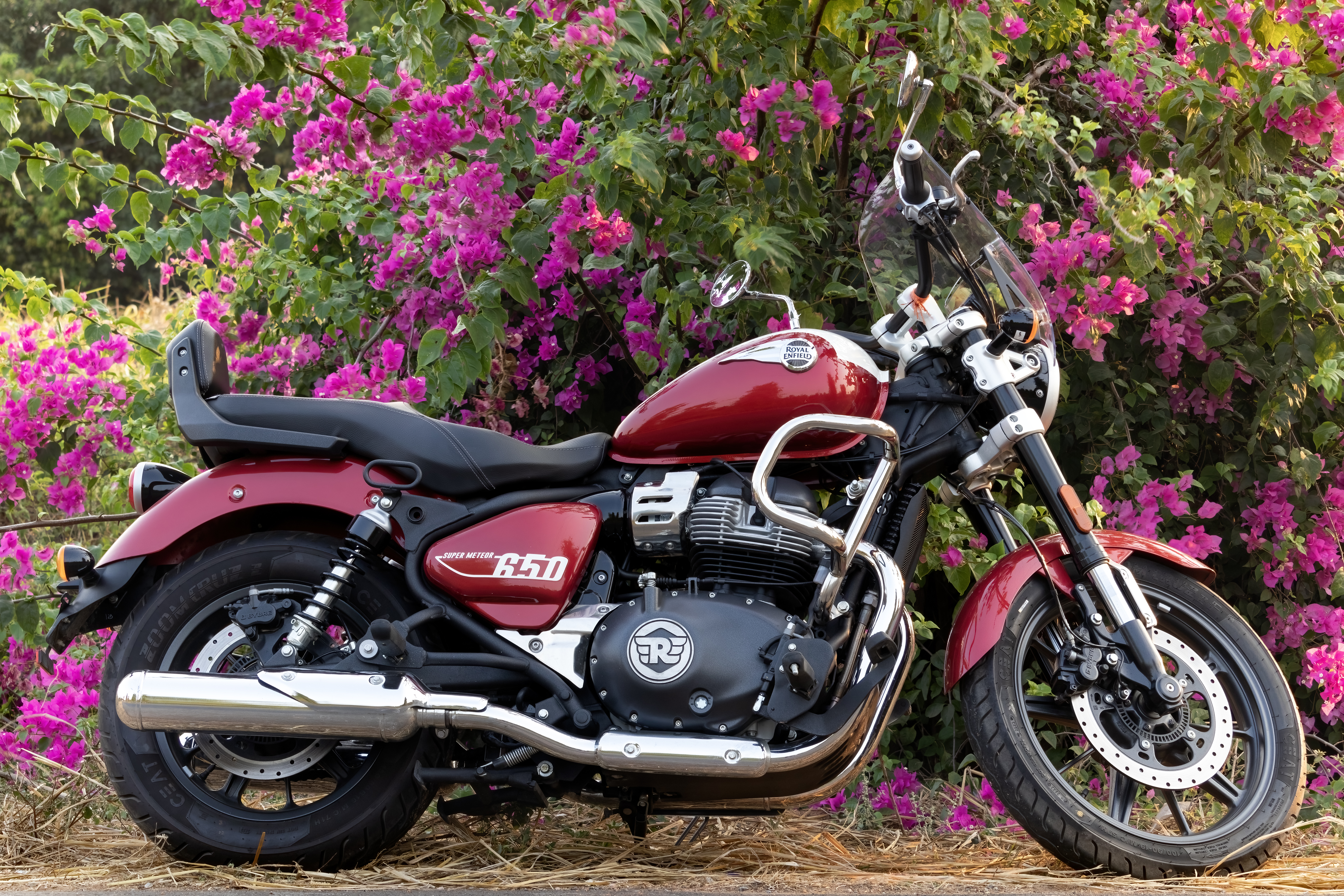
Super Meteor 650 (2023 Model)

In 2023, Royal Enfield released the Super Meteor 650, a 650 twin engine model named after the 1955 model. Motorcycle News reviewed the model positively, awarding 5 stars and stating, "we reckon it's the best value of all the cruisers in this class."

== See also ==
- List of motorcycles of the 1950s
