= Royal Enfield Interceptor =

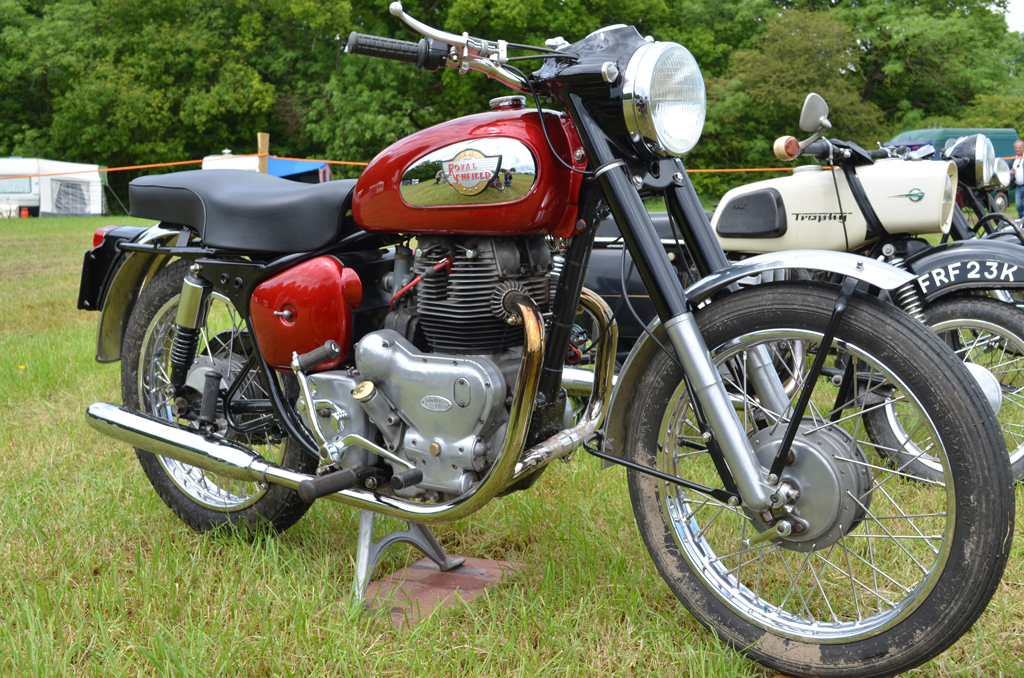
- Timing side view of 1965 Interceptor Series I
- Manufacturer: Royal Enfield
- Production: 1960–1970
- Engine: air-cooled, overhead valve, parallel-twin 1960: 692.7 cc (42.27 cu in) 1962: 736.4 cc (44.94 cu in)
- Bore / stroke: 1960: 70 mm × 90 mm (2.8 in × 3.5 in); 1962: 71 mm × 93 mm (2.8 in × 3.7 in)
- Weight: 410 pounds (190 kg) (wet)

The Interceptor is a British motorcycle made by Royal Enfield between 1960 and 1970. The 700 Interceptor introduced in 1960 was a modified version of the company's 692 cc (42.2 cu in) Constellation model. In 1962, the company introduced the 750 Interceptor which evolved constantly until the end of production in 1970. In 2018, the Interceptor model was reintroduced as a 648 cc (39.5 cu in) parallel twin.

== 700 Interceptor ==
In 1960, Royal Enfield introduced the first motorcycle bearing the name Interceptor. It had a tuned version of the company's biggest engine, the 692 cc vertical-twin and was only sold in the US and Canada. All engines had the engine prefix letters "VAX" and so these are often referred as "VAX Interceptors". The then flagship 692 cc Constellation had the VA engine prefix on the US export model, and "X" was added to denote that Interceptor had an experimental engine. They had twin carburettors, except for some early models; a factory lightened and balanced crankshaft; high-performance "R" cams; Lucas racing magneto with manual advance; and a few other weight saving modifications compared to other Royal Enfield models.

There was also an Interceptor "S" (Sports) model with "highway trim"—quick detachable lights, etc., offered when Enfield failed to sell enough motorcycles in the standard scrambler trim. A total of 158 692 cc Interceptors were made, according to the despatch ledgers from the Redditch factory, now held by the Royal Enfield Owners' Club in the UK. All of these machines should have been stamped with the VAX prefixed engine numbers. The maximum possible number of 692 cc VAX Interceptors is 170. The first examples left the factory in December 1959, and the last were despatched in July 1961.

== Series 1 Interceptor ==
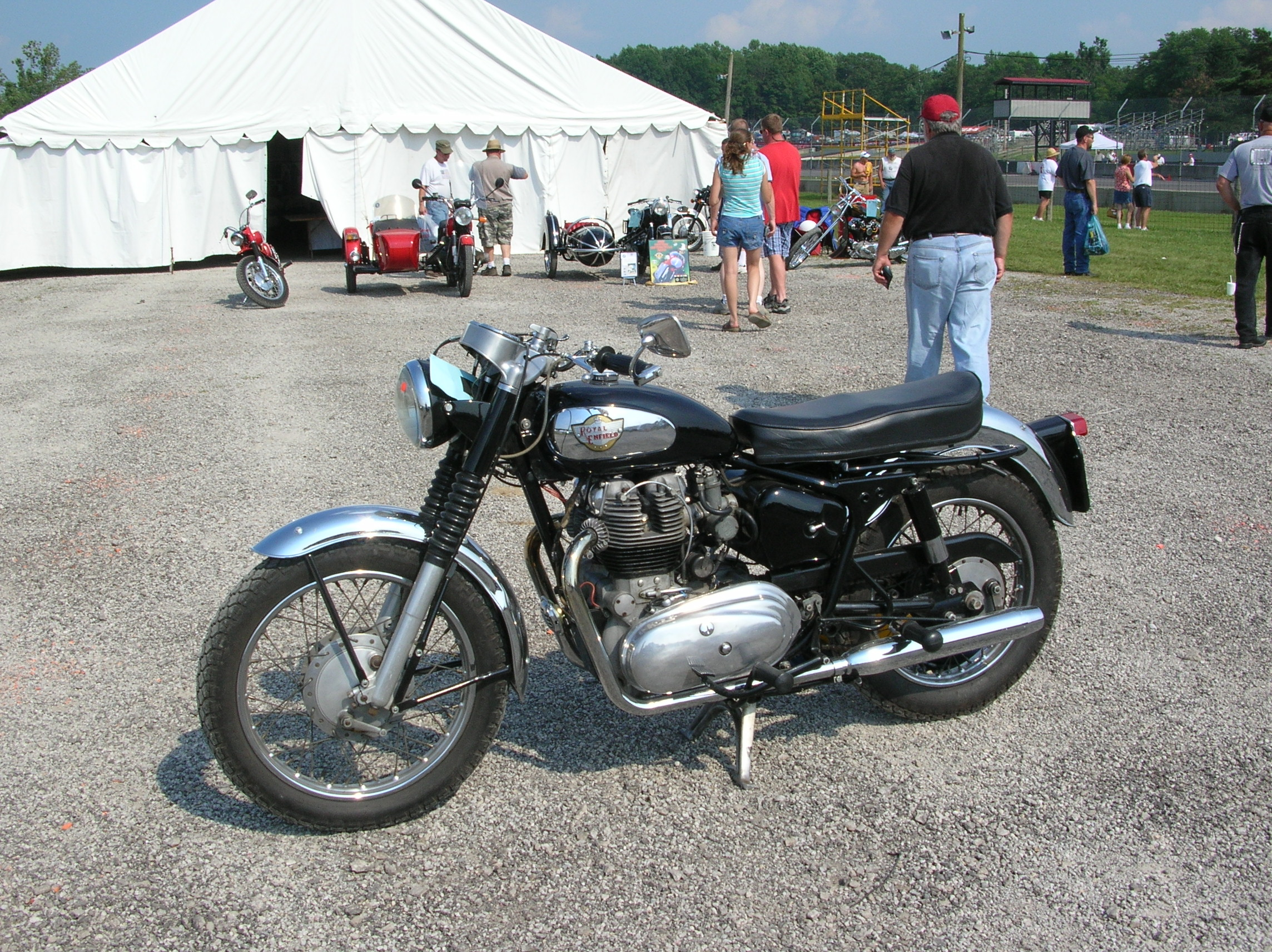
Drive side view of 736cc Interceptor

Royal Enfield introduced their all new 736 cc twin cylinder engine in 1962 on the 750 Interceptor. Bore and stroke was 71 mm × 93 mm (2.80 in × 3.66 in). The new engine was similar to the 692 cc engine; but there was hardly any part that was not modified or improved. The engine cases were strengthened to withstand the increased torque. What sets this engine apart from other contemporary British twins is that the crankshaft was dynamically balanced from the factory which made these motorcycles one of the smoothest British twin engines ever. The Series 1 motorcycles had an automatic advance magneto and a new seat. There was a rare single carburettor model as well. It was manufactured until 1966.

== Series 1A Interceptor ==
In 1967 Royal Enfield closed its main factory, which was in Redditch, Worcestershire. Production of all models was discontinued, except for the Interceptor, production of which was transferred to the Royal Enfield factory in Bradford-on-Avon in Wiltshire.

The Series 1A Interceptor was introduced, with two sub models GP7 and TT7. The major change was the introduction of coil ignition, eliminating the magneto. The US models received a new chrome tank, a new seat, instrument mounts, handlebar, and mudguards. All Series 1A interceptors had twin Mark 1 Amal carburettors.

== Series 2 Interceptor ==
The Series 2 Interceptor engine was a major redesign of the Series 1A engine. It included a wet sump engine to improve oil flow to the crankshaft. The contact breaker points were moved to the end of exhaust camshaft, and the timing cover was redesigned accordingly. This engine was used on the Interceptor until the end of production in 1970.

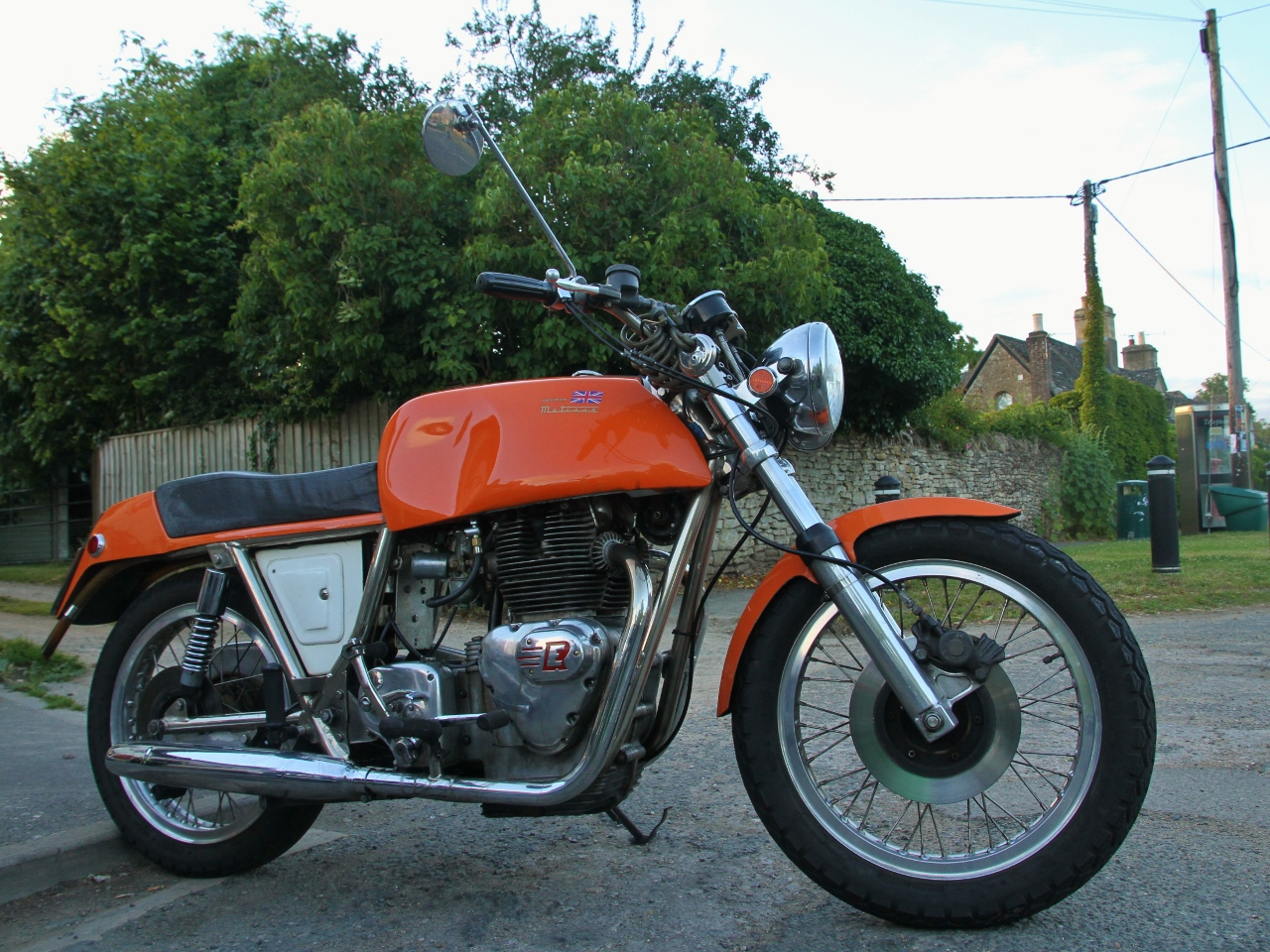
Rickman with Series 2 Interceptor engine

Floyd Clymer bought a batch of Series 2 engines to install in motorcycles that he intended to sell under the Indian brand. However, in January 1970 he died, before beginning production of the motorcycles. Rickman Motorcycles bought the entire batch; installed each one in a Rickman chassis; and sold them as the Rickman Interceptor.

== Series 3 prototype ==
Royal Enfield made a prototype Series 3 Interceptor to replace the Series 2. The bore was enlarged to 73 mm (2.87 in) to increase the engine capacity to 778 cc, and it was called the 800 Interceptor. However, the factory in Bradford-on-Avon closed down without beginning series production.

== 2018 Interceptor 650 ==
In November 2017 at EICMA, Royal Enfield debuted a new parallel twin, the Interceptor 650. The modern model was unveiled by Royal Enfield CEO, Siddhartha Lal and President, Rudratej Singh. Powered by a new air-oil cooled 650 cc parallel twin engine, the new Interceptor draws heavily on its 1960s design heritage. Like the original Interceptor, the new motorcycle has a tubular cradle frame. The teardrop tank has traditional-style Royal Enfield badges and a Monza-style fuel cap.
