= Royal Enfield Hunter 350 =

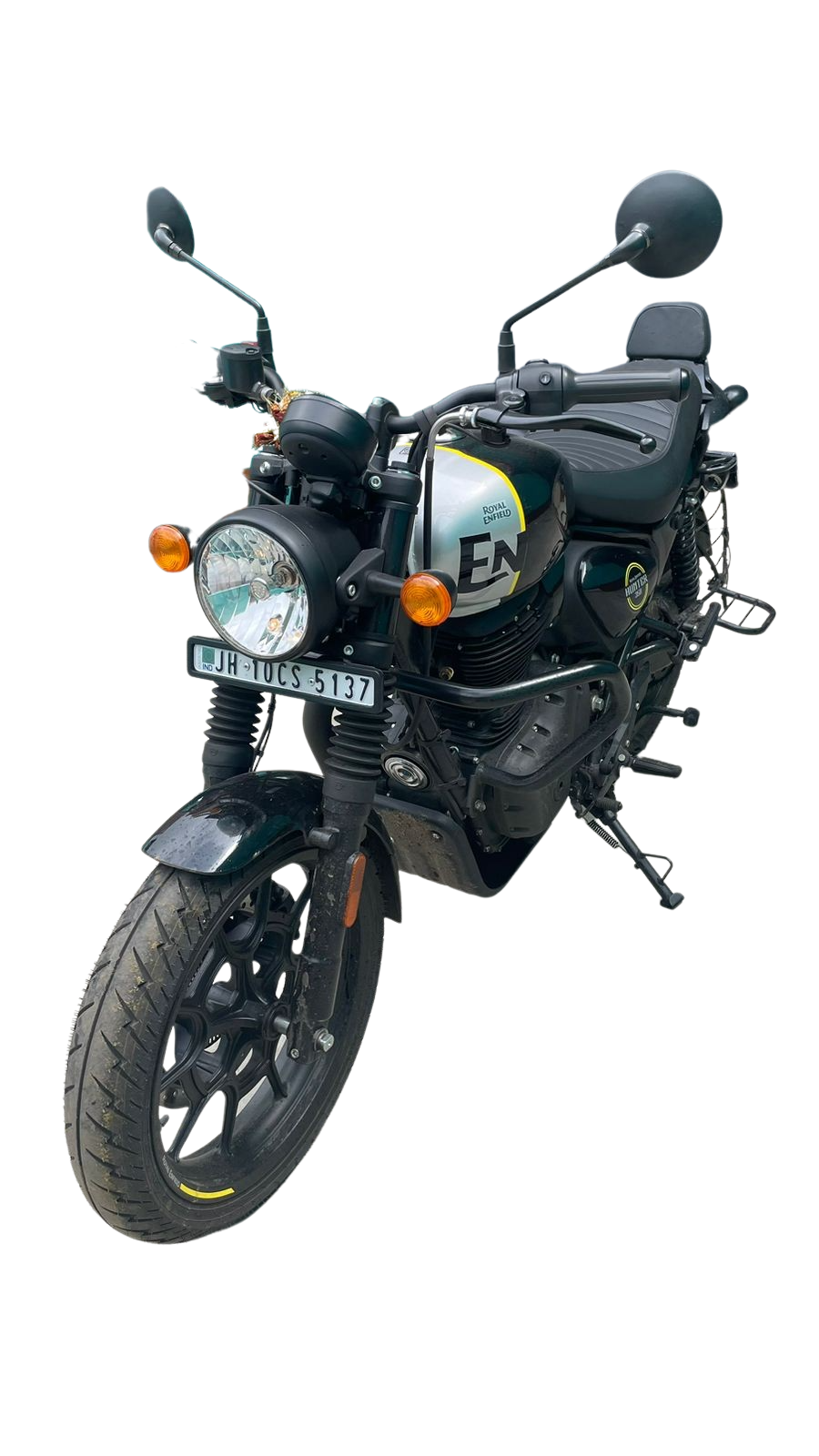
- Royal Enfield Hunter 350, Rebel Black
- Manufacturer: Royal Enfield
- Also called: Royal Enfield HNTR 350 (UK, Europe, South Korea, Argentina)
- Parent company: Eicher Motors
- Production: 2022 - Present
- Class: dual-purpose
- Engine: 349 cc (21.3 cu in) Air-oil cooled Single cylinder, 4-stroke, ECU Controlled
- Bore / stroke: 72 mm × 85.8 mm (2.83 in × 3.38 in)
- Compression ratio: 9.5:1
- Top speed: 120 km/h
- Power: 14.87kW@ 6100 rpm
- Torque: 27Nm@ 4000 rpm
- Ignition type: Electric
- Frame type: Twin Downtube Spine Frame
- Suspension: Front - Telescopic, 41mm forks - 130mm travel Rear - Twin tube Emulsion shock absorbers with 6-step adjustable preload - travel 102mm
- Brakes: Front - 300mm disc with twin piston floating caliper Rear - 270mm disc, single piston floating caliper
- Seat height: 790(mm)
- Fuel capacity: 13 ± 0.5 litres

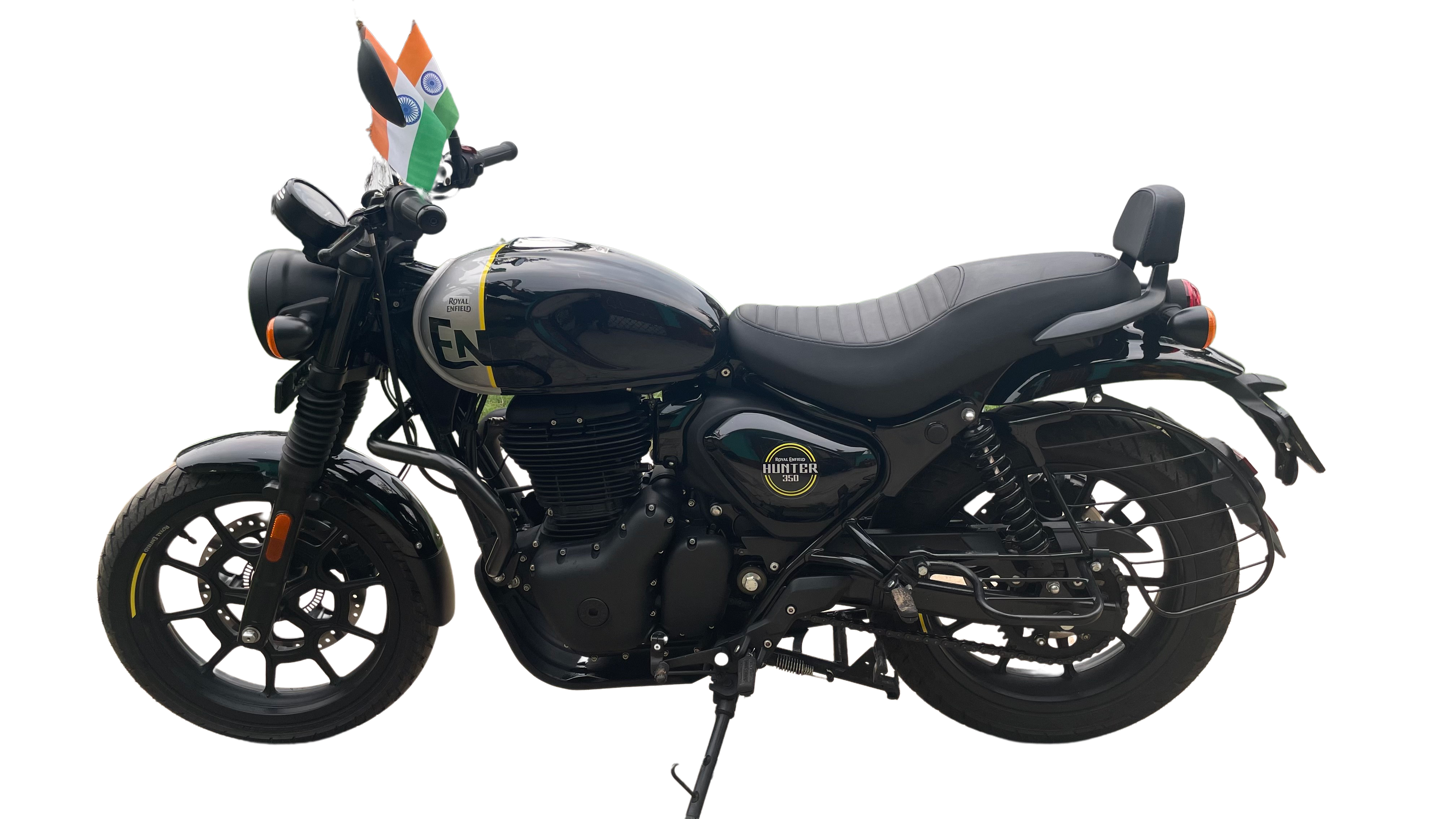
Hunter 350 Rebel Black

The Royal Enfield Hunter 350 is an Indian roadster motorcycle launched by Royal Enfield in August 2022. It is powered by 349cc BS6 engine that produces 20.2 bhp and 27 Nm of torque with 5 speed gearbox and slipper assist clutch. The Hunter 350 is the most affordable motorcycle under the new J-platform, and the second least expensive bike after Royal Enfield Bullet 350. The motorcycle features a retro-style single-piece seat, a classic round headlamp, a flat handlebar and a sculpted fuel tank. Within a month of its launch, the Hunter 350 became the second highest selling Royal Enfield motorcycle.

== Variant ==
Royal Enfield Hunter 350 is available in 2 variants: Metro, Retro

The Hunter 350 Metro has a more modern, sporty look with a sleek teardrop tank, round headlight, and blacked-out engine. The Retro has a classic, vintage look with a square tank, round headlight, and chrome engine. The Retro also has a higher seat height and different handlebars. Performance-wise, both bikes feature a single-cylinder 346cc engine with 19.8 bhp and 28 Nm of torque. It gives mileage around 36.2 kmpl

== Sales ==
The Royal Enfield Hunter 350 hit a milestone, surpassing 5 lakh units sold in less than two and a half years since its debut in August 2022. With monthly sales between 15,000 and 17,000 units, it is being sold not just in India but also across global markets, including Europe, North America, and Australia.
