= Royal Enfield (England) =

Brand name used by a European automobile company

The Enfield Cycle Company Limited
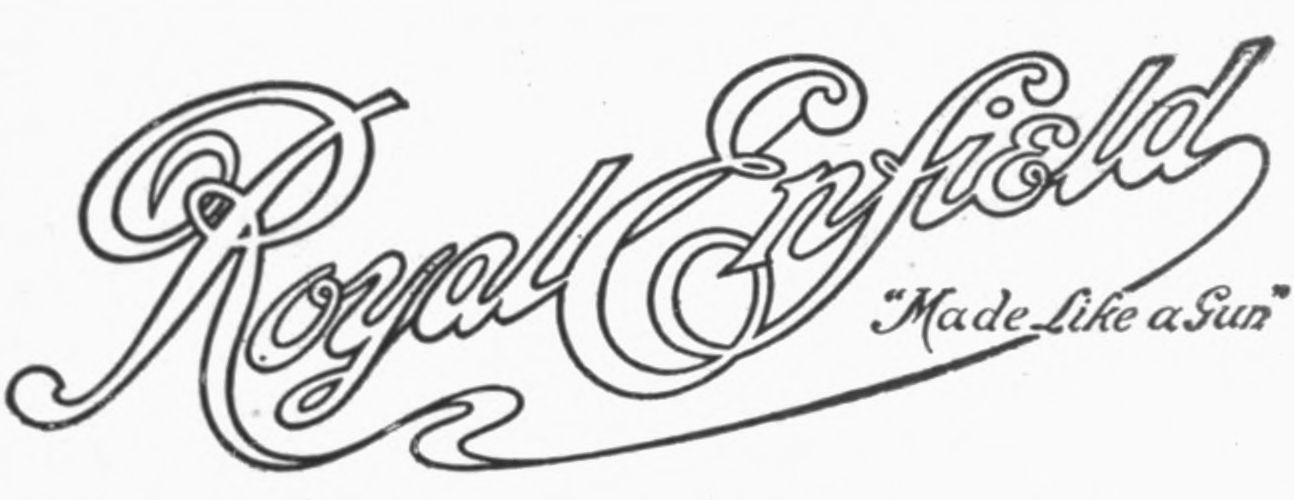
- Type: Public Listed Company
- Industry: Motorcycles, guns, bicycles
- Founded: 1901; 125 years ago
- Founder: Albert Eadie and Robert Walker Smith
- Defunct: 1971; 55 years ago
- Fate: Defunct, name still in use by Eicher Motors
- Successor: Royal Enfield of India
- Headquarters: Redditch, Worcestershire, United Kingdom
- Products: Royal Enfield Clipper, Crusader, Bullet, Interceptor, WD/RE, Super Meteor

Royal Enfield was a brand name under which The Enfield Cycle Company Limited of Redditch, Worcestershire, England, sold motorcycles, bicycles, lawnmowers and stationary engines which it manufactured. Enfield Cycle Company also used the brand name "Enfield" without the "Royal". Later in 1994, Eicher Motors, an Indian multinational automobile manufacturing company, acquired full ownership of the company. The first Royal Enfield motorcycle was built in 1901. The Enfield Cycle Company's Royal Enfield Bullet is the longest-lived motorcycle design in history.

Royal Enfield's spare parts operation was sold to Velocette in 1967, which benefited from the arrangement for three years until its closure in early 1971. Enfield's remaining motorcycle business was acquired by Norton Villiers in 1967, and the business eventually closed in 1978.

== History ==
George Townsend established a business in 1851 in Redditch, specialising in the manufacture of sewing needles. In 1882, his son, also named George, started making components for cycle manufacturers, including saddles and forks. By 1886, complete bicycles were being sold under the names Townsend and Ecossais. This business suffered a financial collapse in 1891. Albert Eadie, sales manager of Birmingham's Perry & Co Ltd, pen makers who had begun to supply components for cycles, and Robert Walker Smith, an engineer from D. Rudge & Co, were chosen by Townsend's bankers to run the business. Then, in 1892, the firm was re-incorporated as Eadie Manufacturing Company Limited, based in Snow Hill, Birmingham. Later, in 1907, after serious losses from their newly floated Enfield Autocar business, Eadie Manufacturing and its pedal-cycle component business were absorbed by Birmingham Small Arms Company (BSA). Years later, the BSA chairman was to tell shareholders that the acquisition had "done wonders for the cycle department". Eadie still retained a separate identity when Raleigh bought BSA's cycle interests in 1957.

== Enfield ==
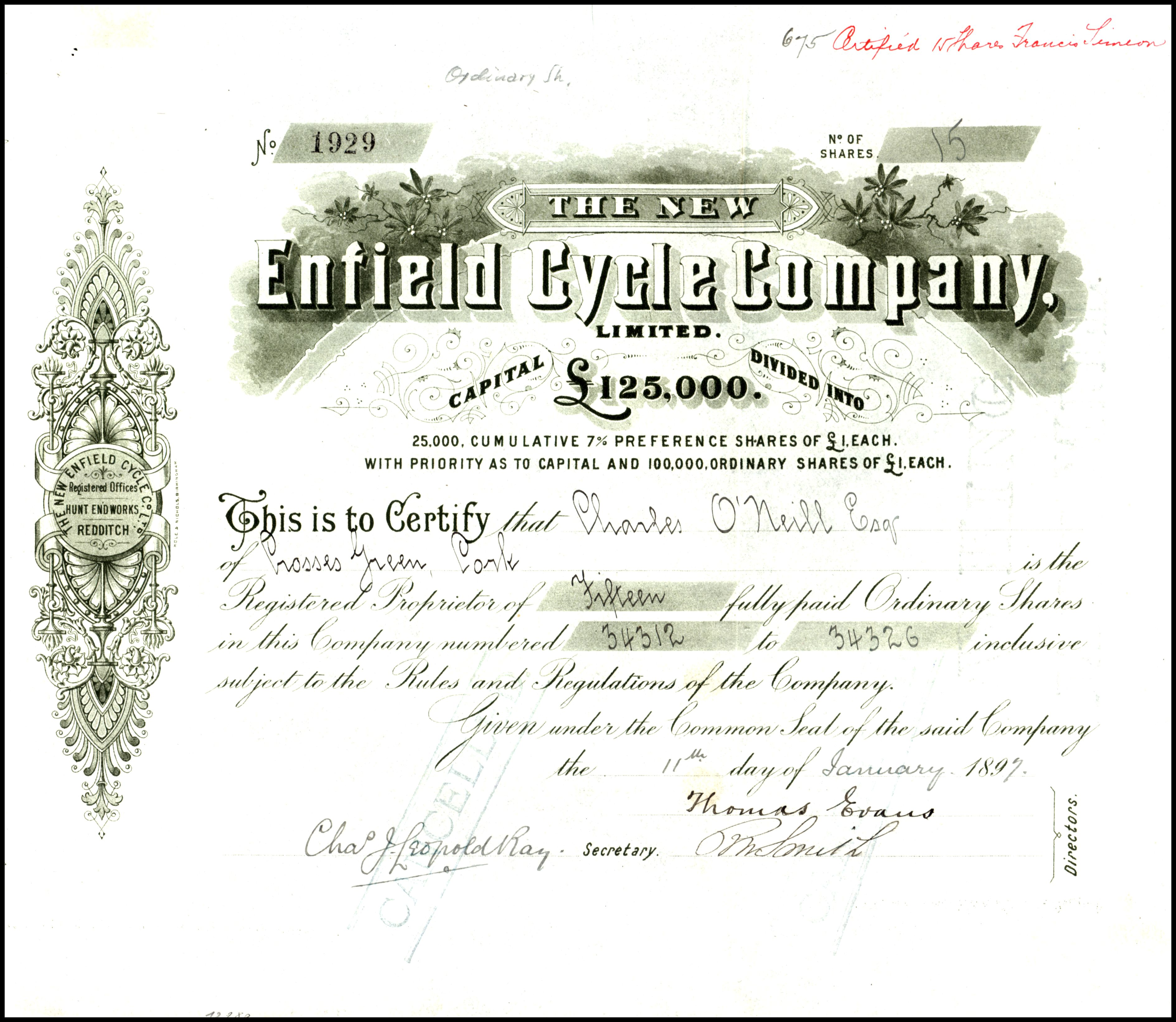
Share of "The New Enfield Cycle Company", issued 11. January 1897

Eadie had won contracts to supply precision parts for firearms to the government's long-established Royal Small Arms Factory at Enfield, Middlesex, with its offshoot in Sparkbrook, and had assumed the brand name Royal Enfield. In 1896, they also incorporated a new subsidiary company, The New Enfield Cycle Company Limited, (Note: From 1896 to 1897 known as "The New Enfield Cycle Company Limited") to handle much of the cycle work. In 1897, Enfield, which made complete cycles as well as parts for other assemblers, took over all the cycle assembly work from Eadie.

Enfield diversified into motorcycles in 1901 and motor cars in 1902. The motor department was established as a separate subsidiary, Enfield Autocar Company Limited, incorporated in 1906 and located in the new works at Hunt End, Redditch. However, Enfield Autocar, after just 19 months, reported a substantial loss, and, aside from Eadie himself, shareholders were unwilling to provide more capital. Therefore, in early 1907, Eadie sold his control of Eadie Manufacturing to BSA. Albert Eadie and Robert Walker Smith had been appointed directors of BSA before the proposed sale had been put to shareholders. The new combined BSA and Eadie b, Enfield Autocar, after just 19 months, reported a substantial loss, and, aside from Eadie himself, shareholders were unwilling to provide more capital, so in early 1907, business manufactured "military and sporting rifles, (pedal) cycle and cycle components, motor-cars etc." "BSA and Eadie cycle specialities". But there were still minority Eadie shareholders alongside BSA in 1957.

The business of Enfield Autocar, that is to say, the plant and stock, was sold to Birmingham's Alldays & Onions Pneumatic Engineering. Enfield Cycle Company took over the Hunt End premises.

In 1955, Enfield Cycle Company partnered with Madras Motors in India to form Enfield of India, based in Chennai. It began assembling the 350cc Royal Enfield Bullet motorcycle in Madras. The first machines were assembled from components imported from England. Starting in 1957, Enfield of India acquired the machines necessary to manufacture components in India, and by 1962, all components were produced domestically.

Frank Walker Smith (1888–1962), eldest son of Robert Walker Smith, joined Enfield Cycle Company in 1909. Appointed joint (with his father) managing director in 1914, he took over the full responsibility when his father died in 1933. After his death, Enfield was bought by investors E & H P Smith, who sold Enfield for £82,500 to Norton Villiers in 1967. While Norton Villiers acquired 33 per cent of Enfield India the assets of Enfield's diesel engine division and pedal cycle and spares divisions were not picked up.

Royal Enfield produced bicycles at its Redditch factory until it closed in early 1967. The company's last new bicycle was the 'Revelation' small wheeler, released in 1965. Production of motorcycles ceased in 1970, and the original Redditch, Worcestershire-based company was dissolved in 1971.

Royal Enfield's spare parts operation was sold to Velocette in 1967, which benefited from the arrangement to such an extent that the company as a whole survived for another three years until their closure in early 1971. C C Cooper, a West Bromwich metals dealer, continued to produce limited spare parts for a short time by a small team of engineers.

Enfield of India continued to produce the 'Bullet' and began branding its motorcycles 'Royal Enfield' in 1999. A lawsuit over the use of 'Royal', brought by trademark owner David Holder, was judged in favour of Enfield of India, who now produce motorcycles under the Royal Enfield name. The models produced and marketed in India include Cafe Racers, Cruisers, Retros and Adventure Tourers.

== Products ==
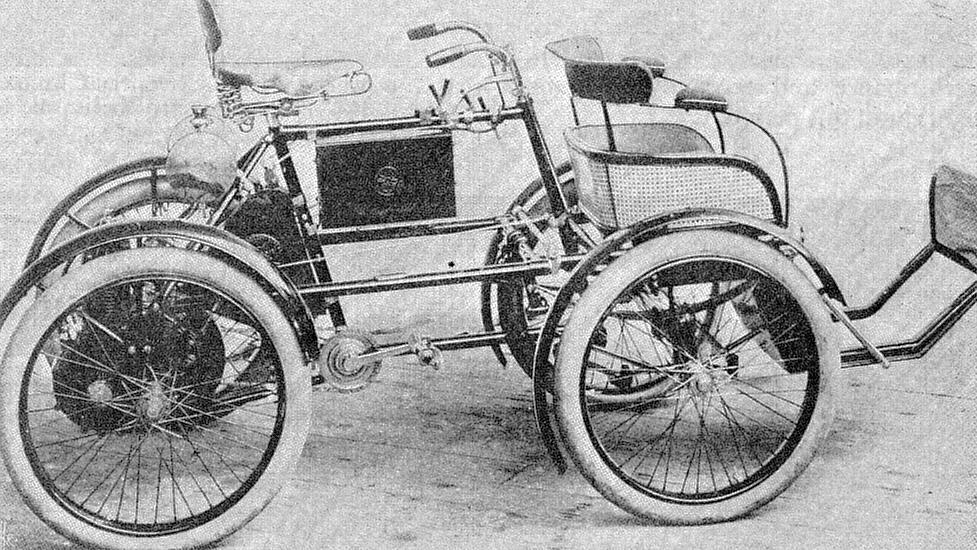
Royal Enfield Quadricycle

By 1899, Royal Enfield were producing a quadricycle – a bicycle modified by adding a wrap-around four-wheeled frame, retaining a rear rider-saddle with handlebars – having a front-mounted passenger seat, driven by a rear-mounted De Dion engine.

After experimenting with a heavy bicycle frame fitted with a Minerva engine clamped to the front downtube, Enfield built their first motorcycle in 1901 with a 239 cc engine.

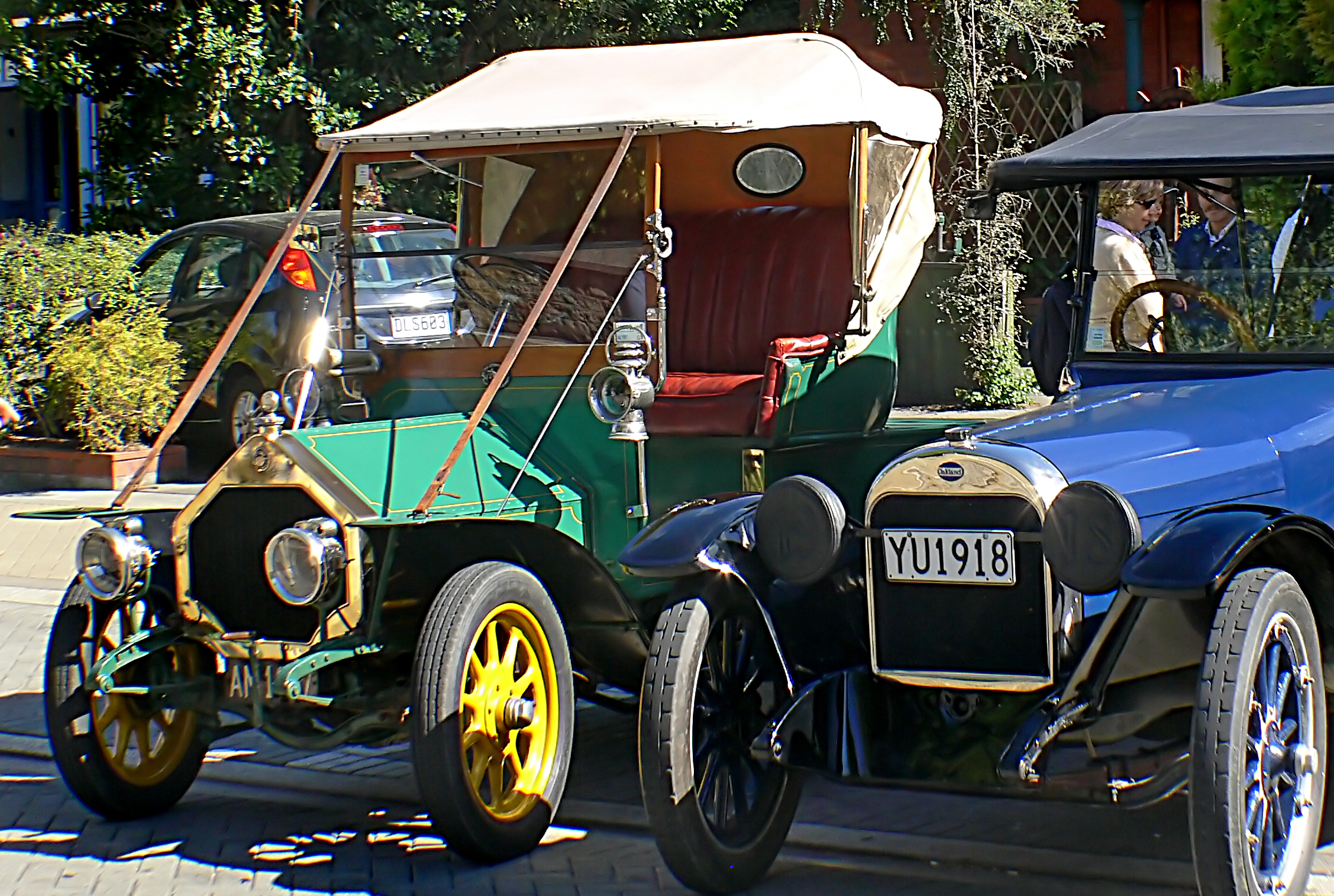
1907 Enfield 15

A light car was introduced in 1903 powered by either a French Ader V-twin or De Dion single cylinder engine. In 1906 car production was transferred to a new company, the Enfield Autocar Co Ltd with premises in Hunt End, Redditch. The independent company only lasted until 1908 when it was purchased by Alldays & Onions.

In 1907, Enfield merged with the Alldays & Onions Pneumatic Engineering Co. of Birmingham, and began manufacturing the Enfield-Allday automobile.

By 1910, Royal Enfield was using direct belt drive 297 cc Swiss Motosacoche V-Twin engines which were enlarged to 344cc for 1911 with the advent of chain drive and the Enfield 2-speed gear. Enfield hired Bert Colver from Matchless and competed in the 1911 Isle of Man lightweight TT.

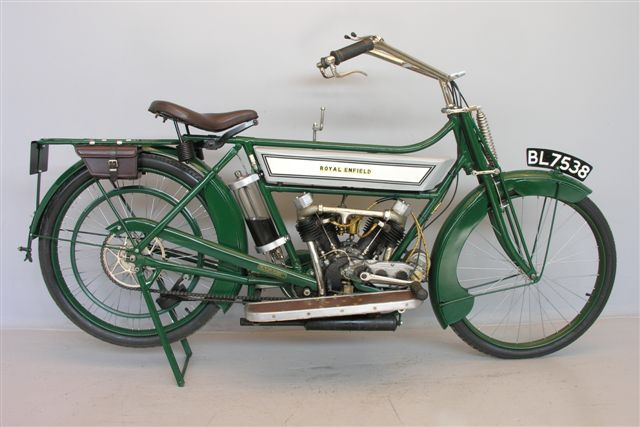
1913 Enfield 425cc

In 1912, the Royal Enfield Model 180 sidecar combination was introduced with a 770 cc V-twin JAP engine which was raced successfully in the Isle of Man TT and at Brooklands. Enfield developed a prototype for the soon-to-arrive 1913 425cc model 140. The prototype was Enfield's first in-house manufactured V-twin, also at 344cc, being of overhead-inlet, side-exhaust layout.

=== First World War (1914–1918) ===
In 1914 Enfield supplied large numbers of motorcycles to the British War Department and also won a motorcycle contract for the Imperial Russian Government. Enfield used its own 225 cc two-stroke single and 425 cc V-twin engines. They also produced an 8 hp motorcycle sidecar model fitted with a Vickers machine gun.

=== Inter-war years (1921–1939) ===
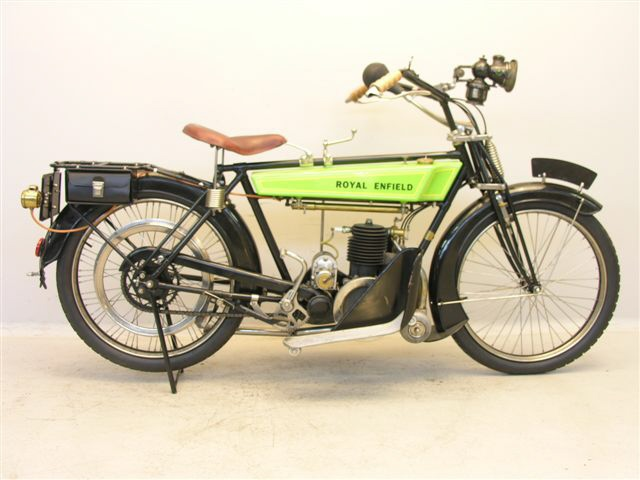
1923 Royal Enfield 225cc

In 1921, Enfield developed a new 976 cc twin, and in 1924 launched the first Enfield four-stroke 350 cc single using a Prestwich Industries engine. In 1928, Royal Enfield began using the bulbous 'saddle' tanks and centre-spring girder front forks, one of the first companies to do so. Even though it was trading at a loss in the depression years of the 1930s, the company was able to rely on reserves to keep going. In 1931, Albert Eadie, one of the founders of the company, died and his partner R.W. Smith died soon afterwards in 1933.

=== Very First Bullet (1932) ===
1932 The Virtual Launch of the Very First Bullet Royal Enfield. When the very first Bullet was presented to the world, it was in a magazine! Due to the Great Depression, and the consequent cancellation of the vaunted Olympia Motorcycle Show, the ‘Motor Cycle’, the most popular motorcycling magazine of the time, decided to publish a special edition where the 250, 350 and 500cc Bullets were showcased to the world for the first time

=== Second World War (1939–1945) ===
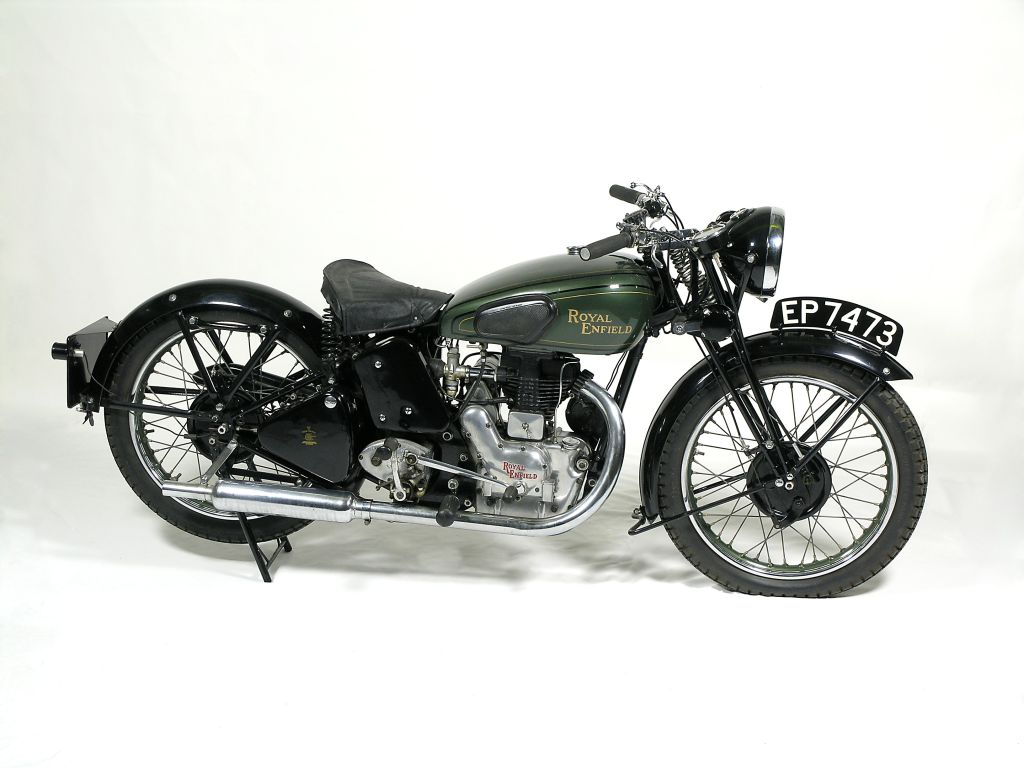
Royal Enfield 250 cc, type 11F

During World War II, The Enfield Cycle Company was called upon by the British authorities to develop and manufacture military motorcycles. The models produced for the military were the WD/C 350 cc sidevalve, WD/CO 350 cc OHV, WD/D 250 cc SV, WD/G 350 cc OHV and WD/L 570 cc SV. One of the most well-known Enfields was the 125cc 2-stroke Royal Enfield WD/RE, designed to be dropped by parachute with airborne troops.

In order to establish a facility not vulnerable to the wartime bombing of the Midlands, an underground factory was set up, starting in 1942, in a disused Bath stone quarry at Westwood, near Bradford-on-Avon, Wiltshire. Many staff were transferred from Redditch and an estate of "prefabs" was built in Westwood to house them.

As well as motorcycle manufacture, it built other equipment for the war effort such as mechanical "predictors" for anti-aircraft gunnery: the manufacture of such high-precision equipment was helped by the constant temperature underground. After the war the factory continued, concentrating on engine manufacture and high-precision machining. After production of Royal Enfield motorcycles ceased, the precision engineering activities continued until the final demise of the company.

== Postwar Model G and Model J and ex-military C and CO (1946–1954) ==
Postwar, Royal Enfield resumed production of the single cylinder ohv 350cc model G and 500cc Model J, with a rigid rear frame and telescopic front forks. These were ride-to-work basic models, in a world hungry for transport. A large number of factory reconditioned ex-military sv Model C and ohv Model CO singles were also offered for sale, as they were sold off as surplus by various military services.

In 1948, a groundbreaking development in the form of rear suspension springing was developed, initially for competition-model "trials" models (modern enduro type machines), but this was soon offered on the roadgoing Model Bullet 350cc, a single cylinder OHV. This was a very popular seller, offering a comfortable ride. A 500cc version appeared shortly after. A mid-1950s version of the Bullet manufacturing rights and jigs, dies and tools was sold to India for manufacture there, and developed versions continue there to this day.

== 500 Twins, Meteors, Super Meteors and Constellations (1949–1963) ==
In 1949, Royal Enfield's version of the now popular-selling parallel twins appeared. This 500cc version was the forerunner of a range of Royal Enfield Meteors, 700cc Super Meteors and 700cc Constellations. Offering good performance at modest cost, these sold widely, if somewhat quietly in reputation. The 700cc Royal Enfield Constellation Twin has been described as the first superbike.

== 250 cc models ==
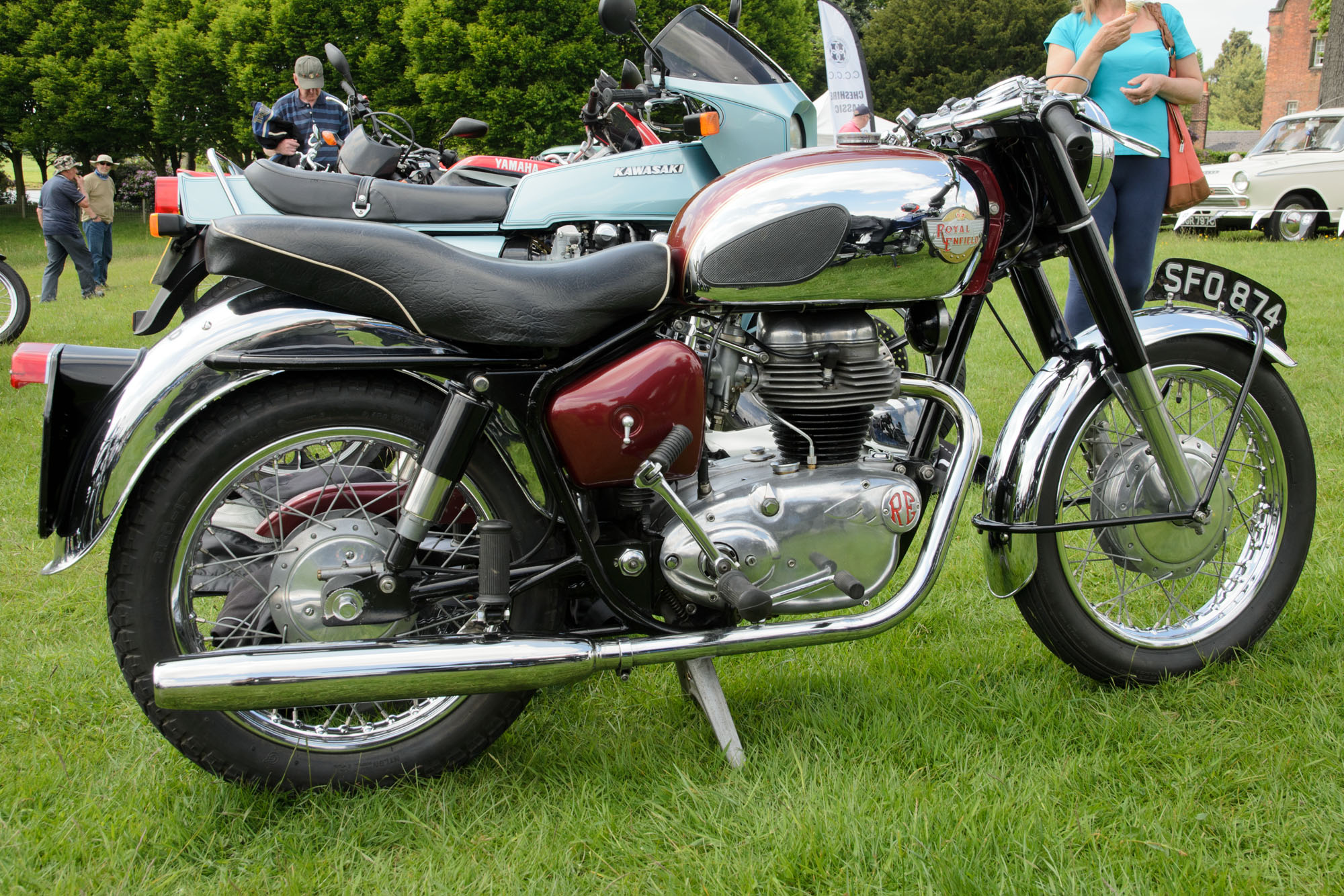
1959 Royal Enfield Crusader

Under the Roads Act 1920, Vehicle Excise Duty in the UK for motorcycles was graduated, with thresholds at 150cc and 250cc. Most motorcycles in these lightweight classes were designed as economical transport. Royal Enfield supplied this market with budget models such as the 150cc Ensign and 250cc Clipper. However, the Road Traffic Act 1960 restricted learner motorcyclists to machines with engines smaller than 250cc. This created an incentive for manufacturers to increase the performance of their 250cc models, to appeal to young riders.

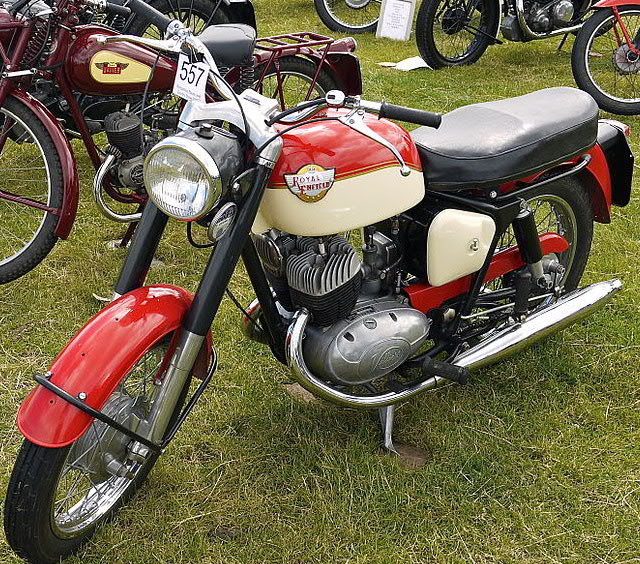
Royal Enfield Turbo Twin

Royal Enfield produced a number of 250 cc machines, including a racer, the 'GP' and a Scrambler, the 'Moto-X', which used a modified Crusader frame, leading link forks and a Villiers Starmaker engine. The Clipper was a base-model tourer with the biggest-seller being the Crusader, a 248 cc pushrod OHV single producing 18 bhp (13 kW).

In 1965, a 21 bhp (16 kW) variant called the Continental GT, with red GRP tank, five-speed gearbox (which was also an option on the Crusader), clip-on handlebars, rearset footrests, swept pipe and hump-backed seat was launched. It sold well with its race-styling including a fly-screen resembling a race number plate which doubled as a front number plate mount.

The Avon 'Speedflow' full sports fairing was available as an extra in complementary factory colours of red and white.

Other variants were the Olympic and the 250 Super 5, which had a five-ratio gearbox and leading link front suspension. All other Royal Enfield 250 cc road models had a conventional telescopic fork. In 1964 Royal Enfield launched the Turbo Twin, which used the same chassis as the Crusader, but had a Villiers 4T twin-cylinder two-stroke engine.

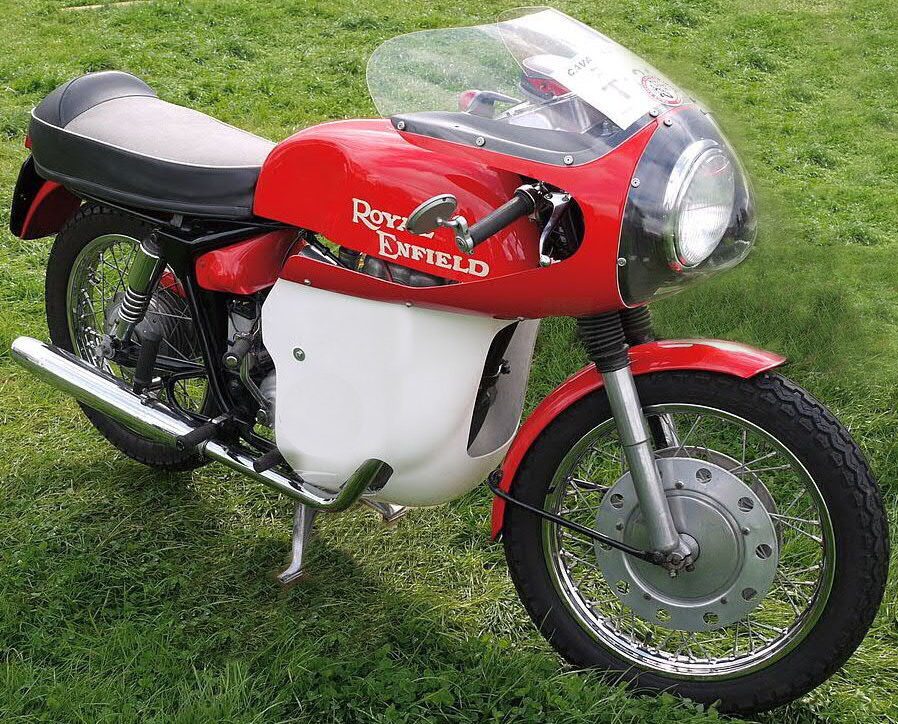
Continental GT with Avon Speedflow nosecone fairing

The Royal Enfield GP production-volume racer was first raced in the Manx Grand Prix in September, 1964. Developed in conjunction with Royal Enfield Racing Manager Geoff Duke the first public appearance was at Earls Court Show in November, 1964. Using a duplex-tube frame, leading link forks and one-piece tank and seat unit, the 250cc two-stroke single engine was similar to other small capacity race machines offered from Villiers-engined rivals such as Cotton, DMW, and Greeves which provided the engines for these marques and many other manufacturers and bike-builders including the 'Starmaker' competition engine used for the Scorpion racer and Sprite scrambler.

== Royal Enfield Interceptor ==
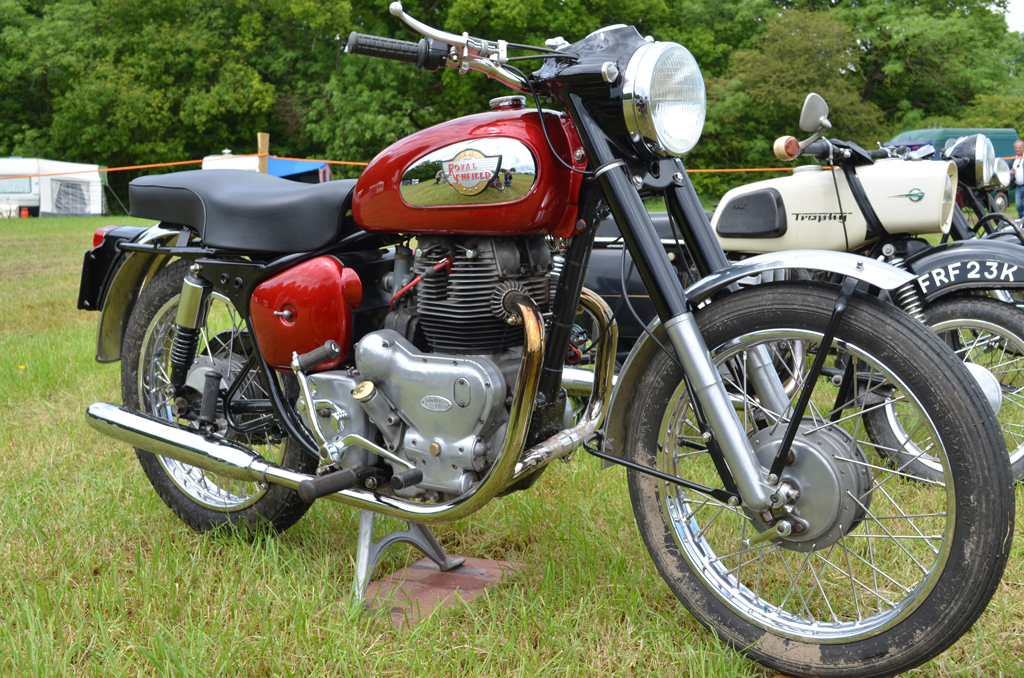
1965 Royal Enfield Interceptor

During the onslaught of the Japanese motorcycle manufacturers in the late sixties and early seventies, the English factories made a final attempt with the 692cc Interceptor in 1960–1961, followed in 1962–1968 by the 736cc Series I and Series II Interceptors. Made largely for the US market, it sported much chrome and strong performance, completing the quarter-mile in less than 13 seconds at speeds well above 175 km/h (105 mph). It became popular in the US, but the company was unable to supply this demand, which accelerated the demise of this last English-made Royal Enfield.

The Redditch factory ceased production in 1967 and the Bradford-on-Avon factory closed in 1970, which meant the end of the British Royal Enfield. After the factory closed a little over two hundred Series II Interceptor engines were stranded at the dock in 1970. These engines had been on their way to Floyd Clymer in the US; but Clymer had just died and his export agents, Mitchell's of Birmingham, were left to dispose of the engines. They approached the Rickman brothers for a frame. The main problem of the Rickman brothers had always been engine supplies, so a limited run of Rickman Interceptors were promptly built.

== Enfield Indians ==
From 1955 to 1959, Royal Enfields were painted red, and marketed in the US as Indian Motorcycles by the Brockhouse Corporation, who had control of the Indian Sales Corporation (and therefore Indian Motorcycles) and had stopped manufacturing all American Indians in the Springfield factory in 1953. But Americans were not impressed by the badge engineering, and the marketing agreement ended in 1960, and from 1961, Royal Enfields were available in the US under their own name. The largest Enfield 'Indian' was a 700 cc twin named the Chief, like its American predecessors.

== See also ==
- List of Royal Enfield motorcycles
