= Royal Enfield Thunderbird =

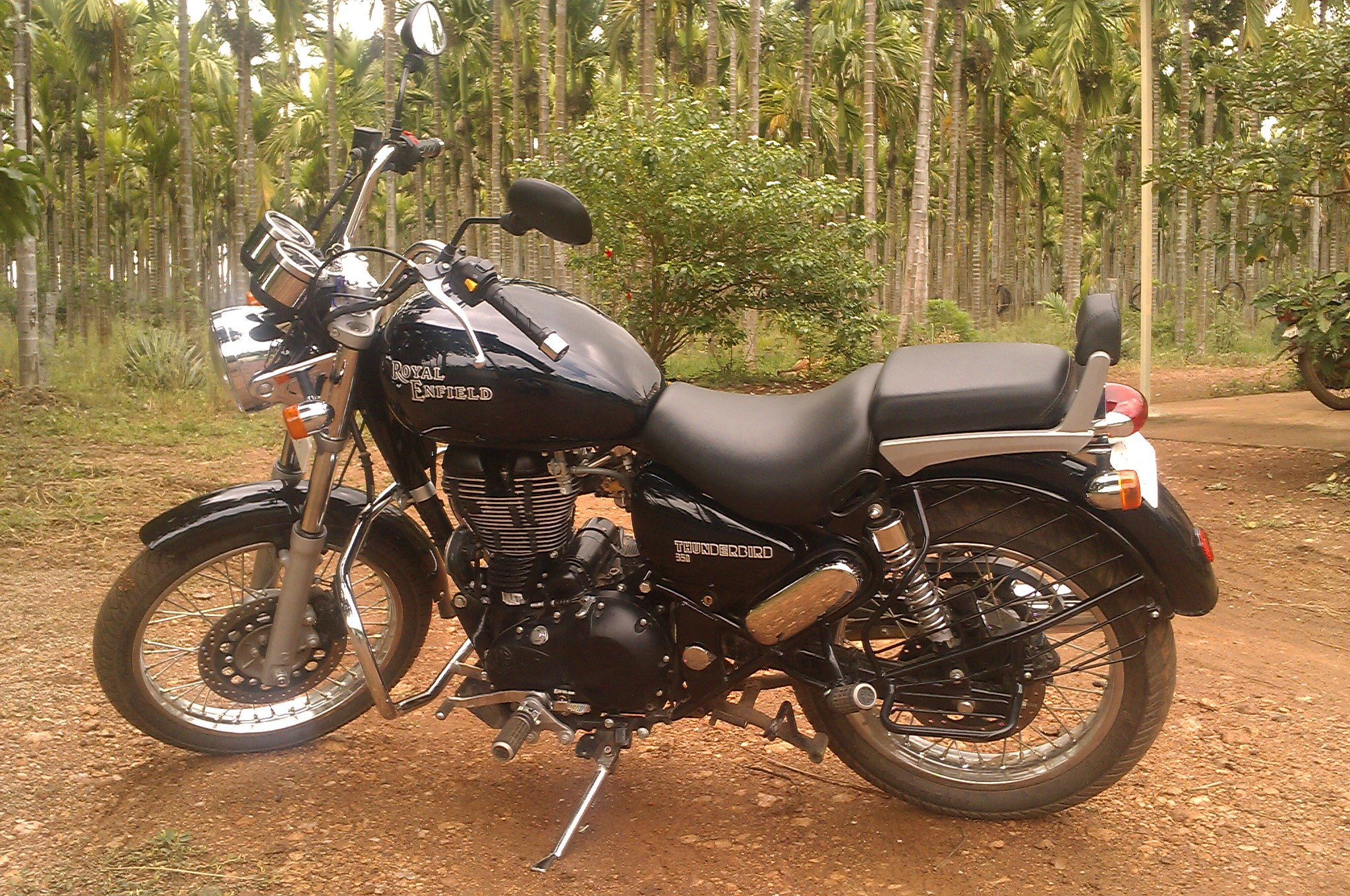
- Royal Enfield Thunderbird
- Manufacturer: Royal Enfield
- Parent company: Eicher Motors
- Production: 2002–2020; 2002–2009 AVL engine 2009–2020 UCE engine
- Predecessor: Lightning 535 1997-2003
- Class: Cruiser
- Engine: 346 cc (21.1 cu in) & 499 cc (30.5 cu in), single cylinder, 4-stroke, OHV, SI Engine, single
- Bore / stroke: 70 mm × 90 mm (2.8 in × 3.5 in); 84 mm × 90 mm (3.3 in × 3.5 in)
- Ignition type: Digital dual spark ignition, Transistor Controlled Ignition(TCI) system Electric and kick start
- Transmission: 5-speed constant mesh, manual
- Brakes: Front – 280 mm Ventilated disc, 2-piston calliper; Rear – 240 mm Ventilated disc, single piston caliper
- Wheelbase: 1,370 mm (54 in)
- Fuel capacity: 19.5 L (4.3 imp gal; 5.2 US gal)
- Ground clearance: 140 mm (5.5 in)

The Royal Enfield Thunderbird was a cruiser style motorcycle produced by Royal Enfield Motors in India from 2002 to 2020. The Royal Enfield Thunderbird is known as Royal Enfield Rumbler in export markets.

The predecessor of the Royal Enfield Thunderbird was the Royal Enfield Lightning 535cc cast iron 4-speed albion gearbox (right side gear shifter) engine, produced from years 2000–2002. Lightning was launched in India in 1997 to 2003.

The thunderbird was first introduced in 2000 with a 350 cc AVL lean burn aluminium engine and a five-speed gearbox with the gear shifter on the left side. It is also the first Royal Enfield to be fitted with a constant vacuum MIKUNI-UCAL Carburettor in stock condition from the company. Initially manufactured models have 'MIKUNI UCAL' in 3D on the carburettors, while the later generation models were fitted with 'UCAL' carburettors from the company.

AVL stands for Anstalt für Verbrennungskraftmaschinen List (German for "Institute for Combustion Engines"), an Austrian-based automotive consulting firm as well as an independent research Institute.

The AVL Royal Enfield engine was first introduced in the year 2000 with a 4-speed gearbox (Albion Motors, Engine gearbox) with the gear shifter on the right side like the old cast-iron head-block Enfield engines on the iconic Royal Enfield Machismo with an AVL Aluminium Head block. The 4-speed AVL aluminum engines with right-side gear shifter were produced from 2000 to 2002 (approx less than 2 years), where as, the 5-speed AVL aluminum engines with left-side gear shifter were produced from 2002 to 2009 (approx less than 7 years). This makes the Royal Enfield AVL engines rare and quite the collector's item. The Royal Enfield Electra, Machismo and Thunderbird all would later share the same 5-speed AVL engine 2002 onward till 2009. The AVL engines when compared to the cast iron would share the same pre unit engine of 4- and 5-speed, but different head blocks of aluminium or cast iron respectively. The AVL engine had a higher compression and shorter stroke when compared to the Cast Iron Engine. Both Cast Iron and AVL Engines would come with a manual decompress lever, as seen on the Royal Enfield AVL Thunderbird & Machismo.

First-generation AVL 5-speed engine Royal Enfield Thunderbirds were produced from 2002 to 2005. These consisted of CDI only as part of its electricals. The bikes were reliable and would start without the need of a battery, in company stock condition, making it more reliable than the cast-iron or the UCE Royal Enfield that needs a battery to start. The chassis were strong-thick-heavy-gauge used from the old cast-iron Enfield's like the 350s/500s Royal Enfield Lightning, Deluxe, Standard Bullet, Machismo etc.

Second-generation AVL 5-speed engine Royal Enfield Thunderbirds were produced from 2005 to 2009. These consisted of CDI+TCI as part of its electricals. Due to TCI the bikes would require a battery to start in company stock condition. Incorporating TCI in its electricals would help achieve a more consistent current from the battery to the spark plug.

In 2009, the AVL semi-unit engine was replaced with the new 346 cc unit construction engine (UCE). The bike was renamed Thunderbird Twinspark owing to the twin sparkplugs in the UCE. Lighter-gauge chassis to reduce weight were incorporated in order to improve performance. This led to a downgrade in terms of quality strength for the UCE Thunderbird as compared to the AVL Thunderbird, however, an upgrade in terms of performance for the UCE Thunderbird due to lighter weight leading to comparatively faster pickup. The final drive chain is moved to the right side and it is the most obvious change from the old model apart from the new engine. The first-generation UCE Thunderbird would share the same 14.3-litre fuel tank and mudguards as the AVL Thunderbird along with 19-inch front and rear wheels. The fuel tank, mudguards along with seat, meter-set, handlebars, pillion backrest, headlight, signal lights, foot pegs etc. on the later-generation UCE Thunderbird models would be replaced with a larger 20-litre tank. The later models would also have an 18-inch rear wheel as compared to the 19-inch rear wheel on the old Thunderbird. Later generation models would consist of the UCE engines as per BS3, BS4, BS6 emission norms. A model of the Royal Enfield Thunderbird with the UCE engine called the Royal Enfield Thunderbird X would have changes to the rider triangle position.

== Thunderbird 350 and 500 ==
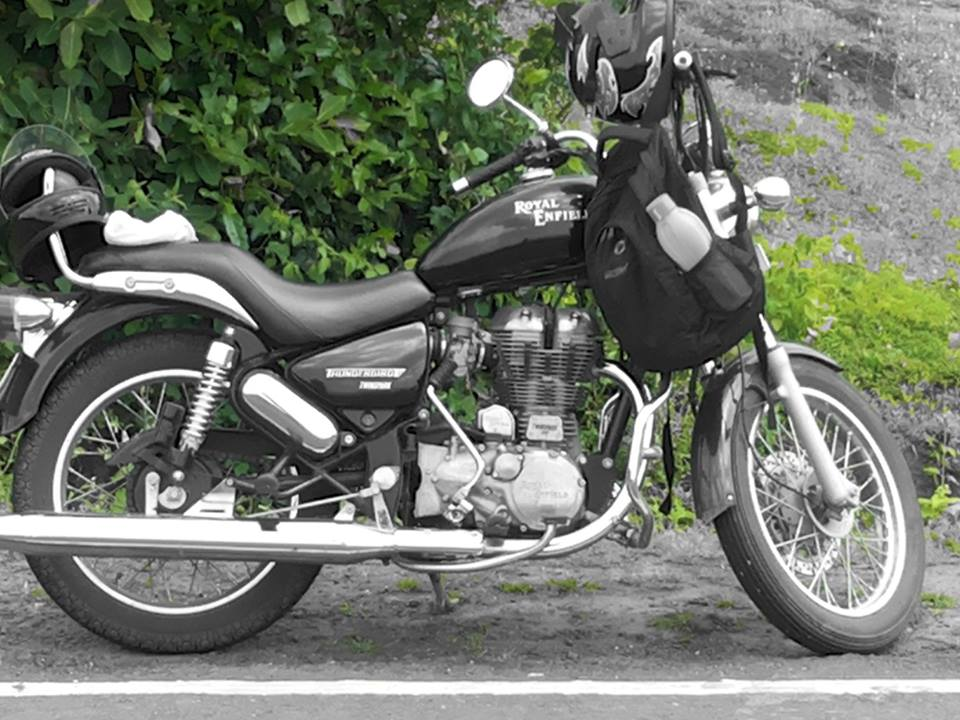
Royal Enfield Thunderbird UCE Model

In October 2012, Royal Enfield launched the new 350 cc and 500 cc variants of the Thunderbird with a facelift. It features front and rear disc brakes, a 20 L (4.4 imp gal; 5.3 US gal) teardrop-shaped fuel tank, a split seat, digital speedometer console and fuel gauge, projector headlamps, LED tail lights and various cosmetic improvements over the 350 cc. Thunderbird 500 gets fuel injection system while Thunderbird 350 operates on carburetor. Later, in 2020 Thunderbird 500 cc was discontinued.

In 2018, another model was released named Thunderbird X in 350 and 500 cc with an anti-lock braking system.
