= Royal Enfield Interceptor 650 =

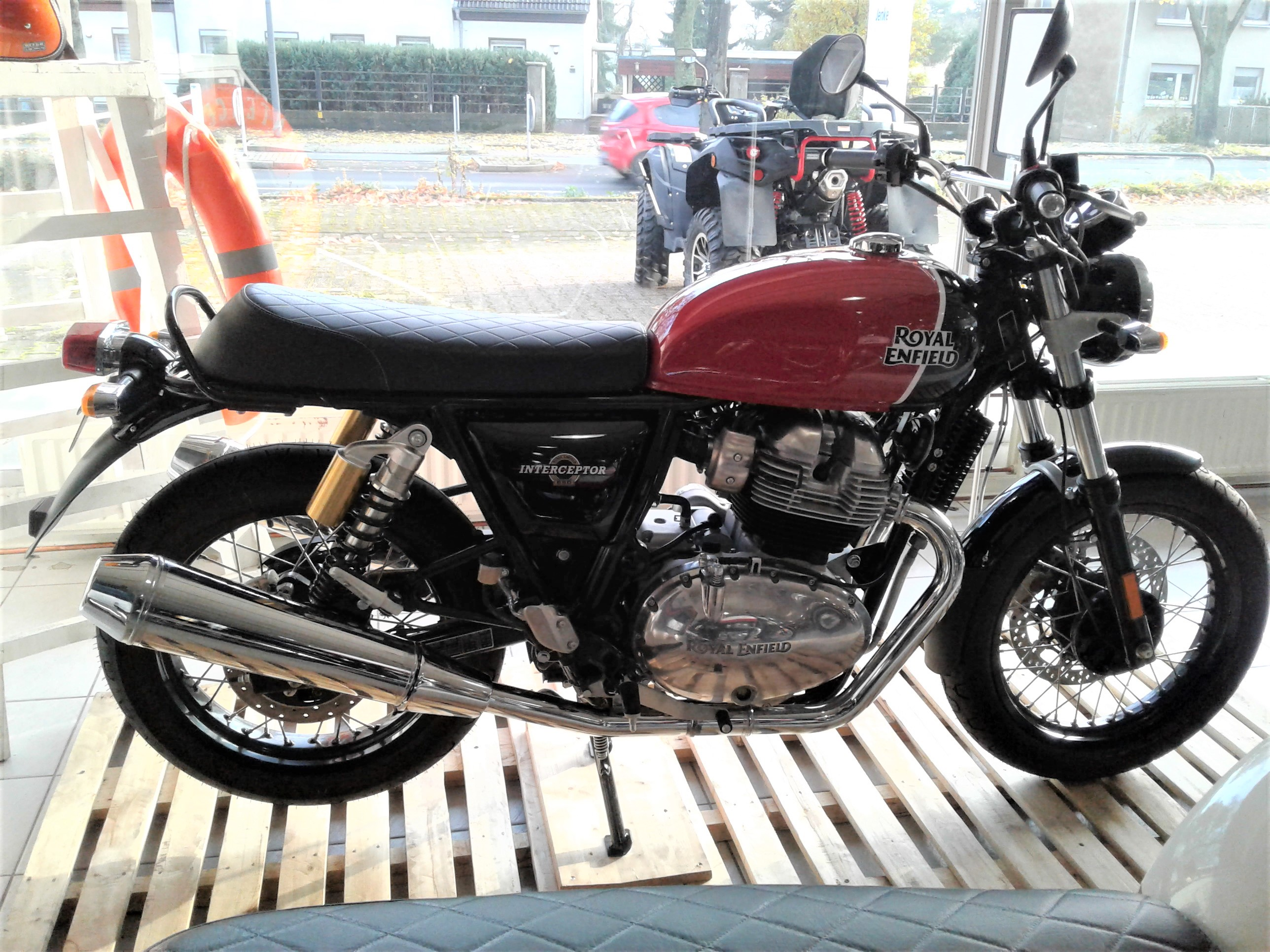
- Manufacturer: Royal Enfield
- Parent company: Eicher Motors
- Production: 2018-present
- Class: Retro Standard
- Engine: 4-stroke, 648 cc (39.5 cu in), air-&-oil-cooled SOHC, 8-valve, 270° parallel twin
- Bore / stroke: 78 mm × 67.8 mm (3.07 in × 2.67 in)
- Top speed: 170 Km/h
- Power: 46.80 hp @ 7250 rpm
- Torque: 52 Nm @ 5250 rpm
- Transmission: 6-speed
- Brakes: Front- 320mm disc (ABS) Rear- 240mm disc (ABS)
- Seat height: 804 mm
- Weight: 202 kilograms (445 lb) (no fuel) (wet)
- Fuel capacity: 13.7 L
- Related: Interceptor Bear 650; Continental GT 650

The Royal Enfield Interceptor 650 is an Indian parallel twin retro-styled motorcycle introduced by Royal Enfield in 2018. It is the first modern twin cylinder motorcycle developed by the company.

The bike was revealed in 2017, design inspired by the 1960s Interceptor which had a 750cc engine. The Interceptor 650 was unveiled alongside the Continental GT 650, which shares the same frame and engine. The Interceptor is a retro-cruiser with relaxed ergonomics, while the Continental GT is a café-racer. Both models are sold in India, Australasia, Europe and the United States and South America. The bike is expected to become the biggest selling large-capacity twin in the world, and in 2020 the Interceptor 650 was the UK's best-selling big bike.

== Design ==
The bike was designed at Royal Enfield's Technology Centre at Bruntingthorpe Proving Ground in Leicestershire, England.

Both models, Interceptor and Continental GT, share the same engine, frame, suspension, wheels, brakes, exhausts and mufflers. The engine is a wet-sump, 648 cc, air/oil cooled SOHC, 8v, parallel twin. Fuelling is via Bosch injection and engine management. The low 9.5:1 compression ratio will help the engine tolerate lower-octane fuel. The crankshaft has a 270° Crank, with a gear-driven balance shaft ahead of the crank. The slipper clutch drives a six-speed gearbox and chain final drive. The cylinder head receives substantial oil-cooling and the bikes have a large oil cooler on the frame downtubes. Producing a modest 46.80bhp @ 7250 rpm, the engine is capable of future development: Bike magazine reported that "the crankshaft's substantial bearing area and the hefty alloy crankcases suggest that the engine could comfortably deliver more power. Compression, capacity and revs could be raised on future models".

The chassis is a tubular twin-downtube cradle frame. Forks are standard telescopics (without gaiters); and rear suspension is via twin shocks(5 step adjustable). The ABS brakes comprise single discs: 320mm (front) and 240mm (rear). Instruments are conventional twin-dial analogue items with digital fuel gauge and trip display.

=== Interceptor 650 ===
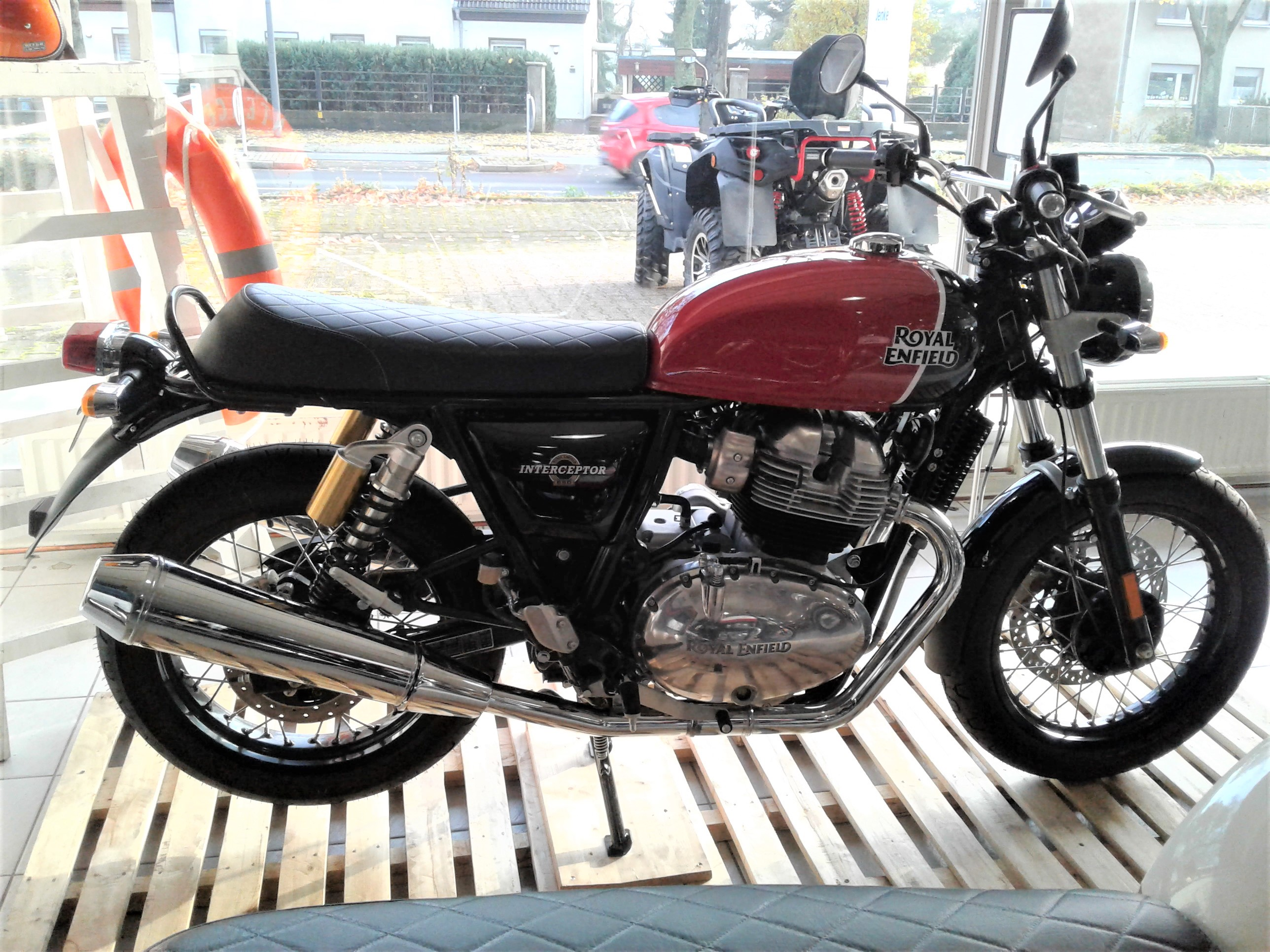
Royal Enfield Interceptor 650 in Ravishing Red

The Interceptor is a conventionally-styled roadster with dual seat, a rounded 13.7 litre saddle tank with a Royal Enfield classic badge and a Monza-style fuel cap. The braced handlebars and more forward-set footrests allow a sit-up-and-beg riding position, and a tubular grab-rail is fitted for the pillion passenger. The Interceptor is marketed as the INT650 in the United States where Honda has a trademark on the Interceptor name.

In 2022, it starts at an ex-showroom price of ₹2.88 lakh (US$3,000) in India.

=== Bear 650 ===
The Royal Enfield Interceptor Bear 650 was officially released on October 31, 2024. It has been described as "a stylish scrambler-styled standard based primarily on the brand’s INT 650 model, though with some notable differences."

On the Design and Styling front, Bear 650 comes with a scrambler seat, side panel number boards, and urban-off-road aesthetics. Full LED lights bring modern functionality.

Derived from the Shotgun series this motorcycle uses Showa USD Forks, but optimized for scrambler duties with longer suspension travel. To complement its off-road credentials, the ride height has been raised. The Interceptor Bear 650 retains the Interceptor 650's brakes but upgrades the front disc size for added stopping power along with Dual-channel ABS with a switchable rear ABS.

Equipped with a full-color TFT screen with integrated navigation brings modern tech to the classic platform. Powered by the 650cc parallel-twin engine delivering 46.80 bhp and an increased torque of 57N-m (5N-m more than the Interceptor), while saving weight owing to two-into-one exhaust system.

== Reception ==
The Interceptor was favourably reviewed by Motorcycle News which stated, "As an overall package, the Royal Enfield Interceptor is great. The engine is lively without being intimidating, the handling is fun without being patronising and the finish is good without breaking the bank". The bike's engine, brakes, and equipment were all praised, but the suspension was criticised as basic, being too soft and underdamped. The Australian website, MC-News also gave a favourable report.

== Known issues ==
A known issue with the motorcycle is the death wobble which many have faced seemingly at varying speeds, starting from 120kph. General consumer consensus is that this happens due to the CEAT tires, or the combination of CEAT tires with unbalanced spoke wheels. Royal Enfield has seemingly rectified this by giving newer models alloy wheels and Pirelli tyres as an option, though it was never officially acknowledged.

== See also ==
- Royal Enfield Interceptor
- 270° parallel twins
- The crossplane concept
