= Retro style =

Historically derivative styles

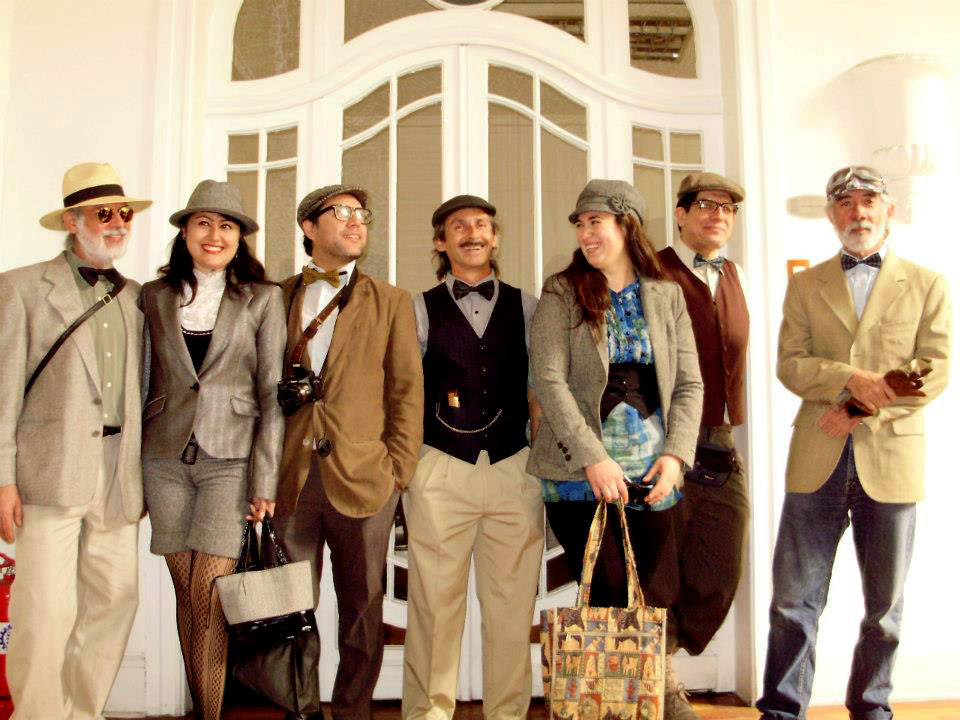
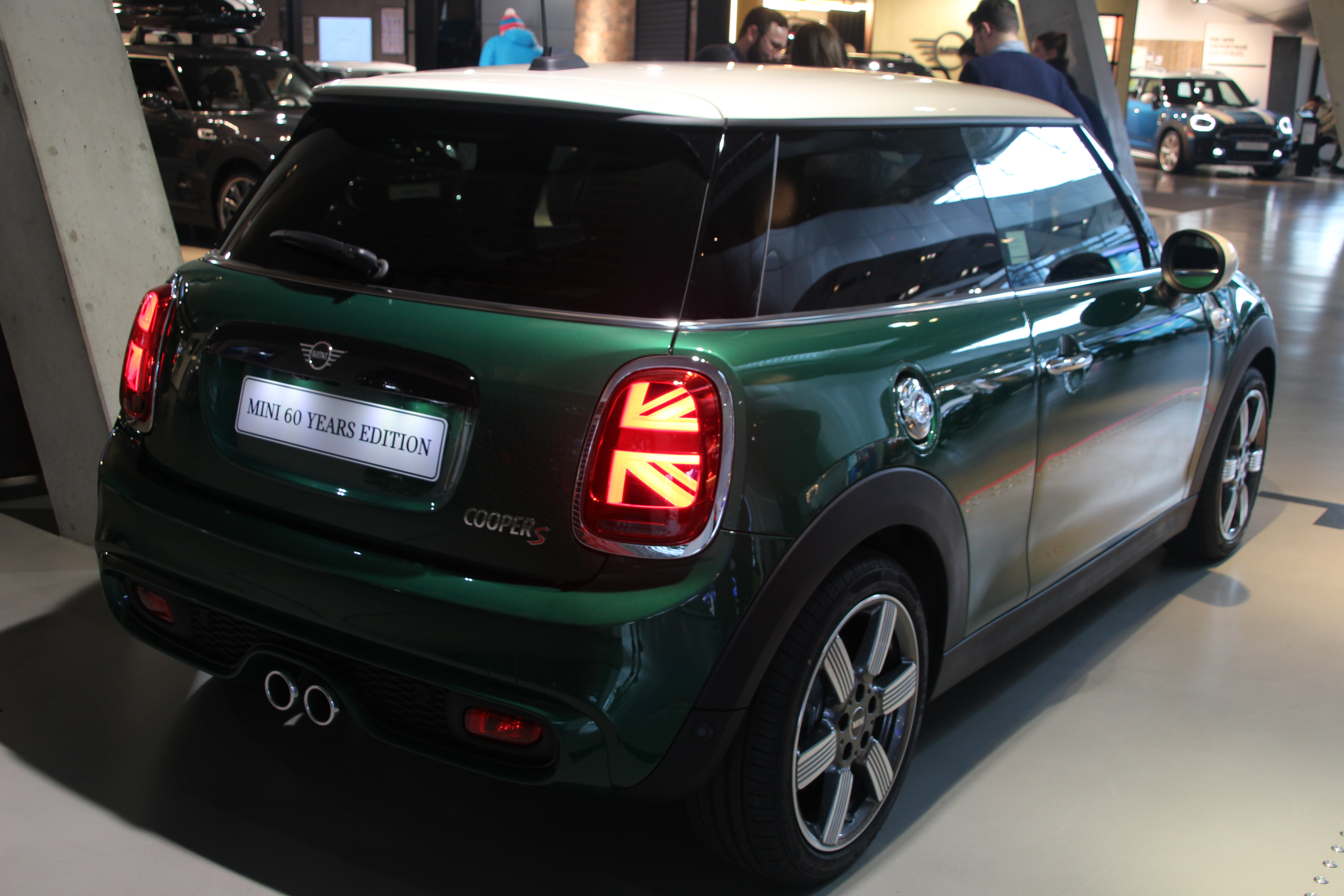
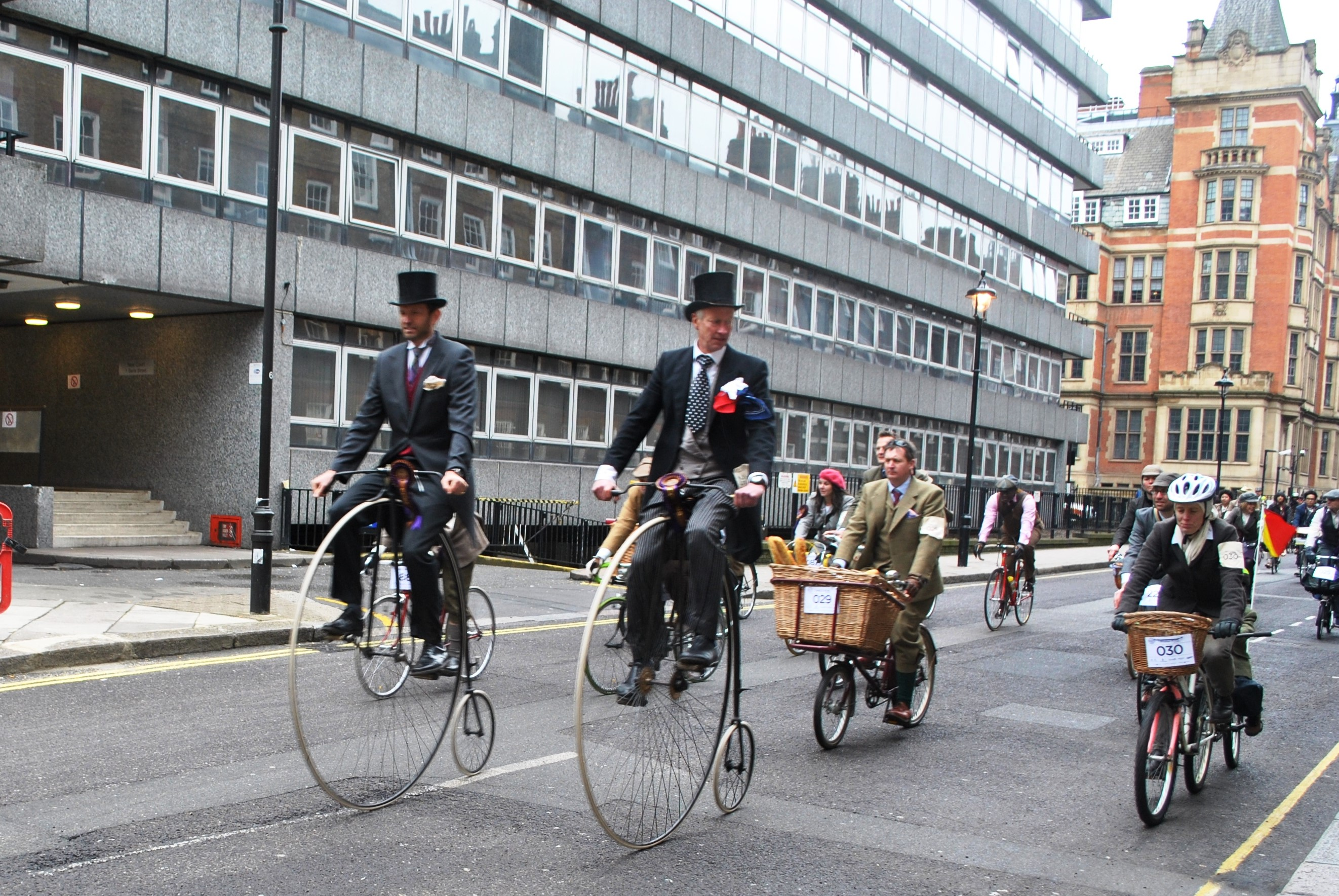
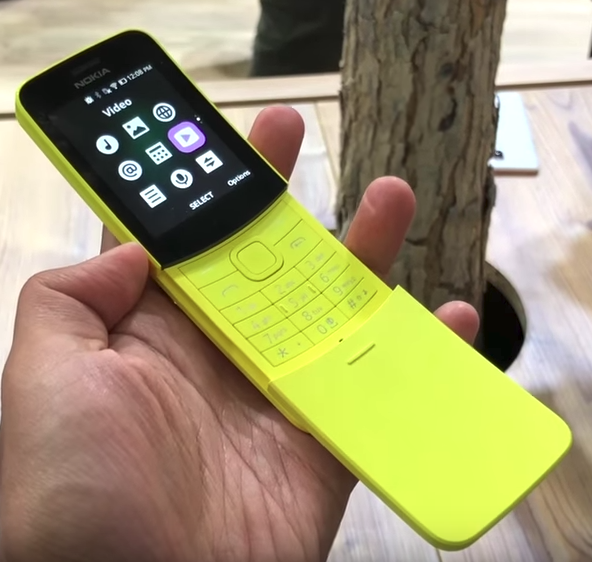
Retro clothing style, Mini with old styling, retro transport (replica penny-farthing bicycles on tweed run) and 2018 recreation of Nokia 8110 mobile phone

Retro style is imitative or consciously derivative of lifestyles, trends, or art forms from the past, including in music, modes, fashions, or attitudes. It has been argued that there is a nostalgia cycle in popular culture.

== Definition ==
The term retro has been in use since 1972 to describe on the one hand, new artifacts that self-consciously refer to particular modes, motifs, techniques, and materials of the past. But on the other hand, many people use the term to categorize styles that have been created in the past. Retro style refers to new things that display characteristics of the past. Unlike the historicism of the Romantic generations, it is mostly the recent past that retro seeks to recapitulate, focusing on the products, fashions, and artistic styles produced since the Industrial Revolution, the successive styles of Modernity. The English word retro derives from the Latin prefix retro, meaning backwards, or in past times.

In France, the word rétro, an abbreviation for rétrospectif, gained cultural currency with reevaluations of Charles de Gaulle and France's role in World War II. The French mode rétro of the 1970s reappraised in film and novels the conduct of French civilians during the Nazi occupation. The term rétro was soon applied to nostalgic French fashions that recalled the same period.

Shortly thereafter retro was introduced into English by the fashion and culture press, where it suggests a rather cynical revival of older but relatively recent fashions. In Simulacra and Simulation, French theorist Jean Baudrillard describes retro as a demythologization of the past, distancing the present from the big ideas that drove the modern age.

Most commonly retro is used to describe objects and attitudes from the recent past that never seem modern. It suggests a fundamental shift in the way we relate to the past. Different from more traditional forms of revivalism, "retro" suggests a half ironic, half longing consideration of the recent past; it has been called an "unsentimental nostalgia", recalling modern forms that are no longer current. The concept of nostalgia is linked to retro, but the bittersweet desire for things, persons, and situations of the past has an ironic stance in retro style. Retro shows nostalgia with a dose of cynicism and detachment. The desire to capture something from the past and evoke nostalgia is fuelled by dissatisfaction with the present.

== Types ==
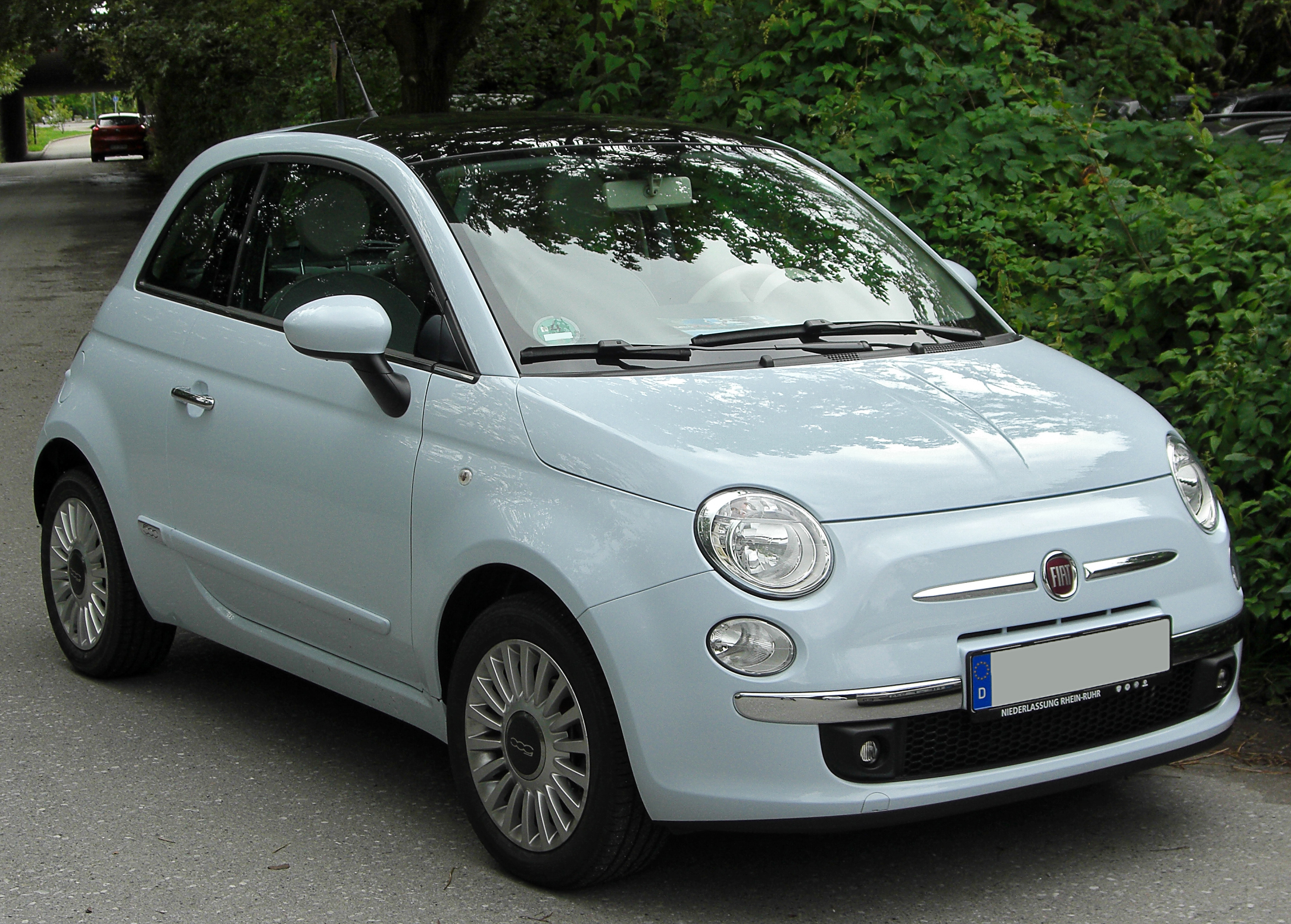
Modern Fiat 500

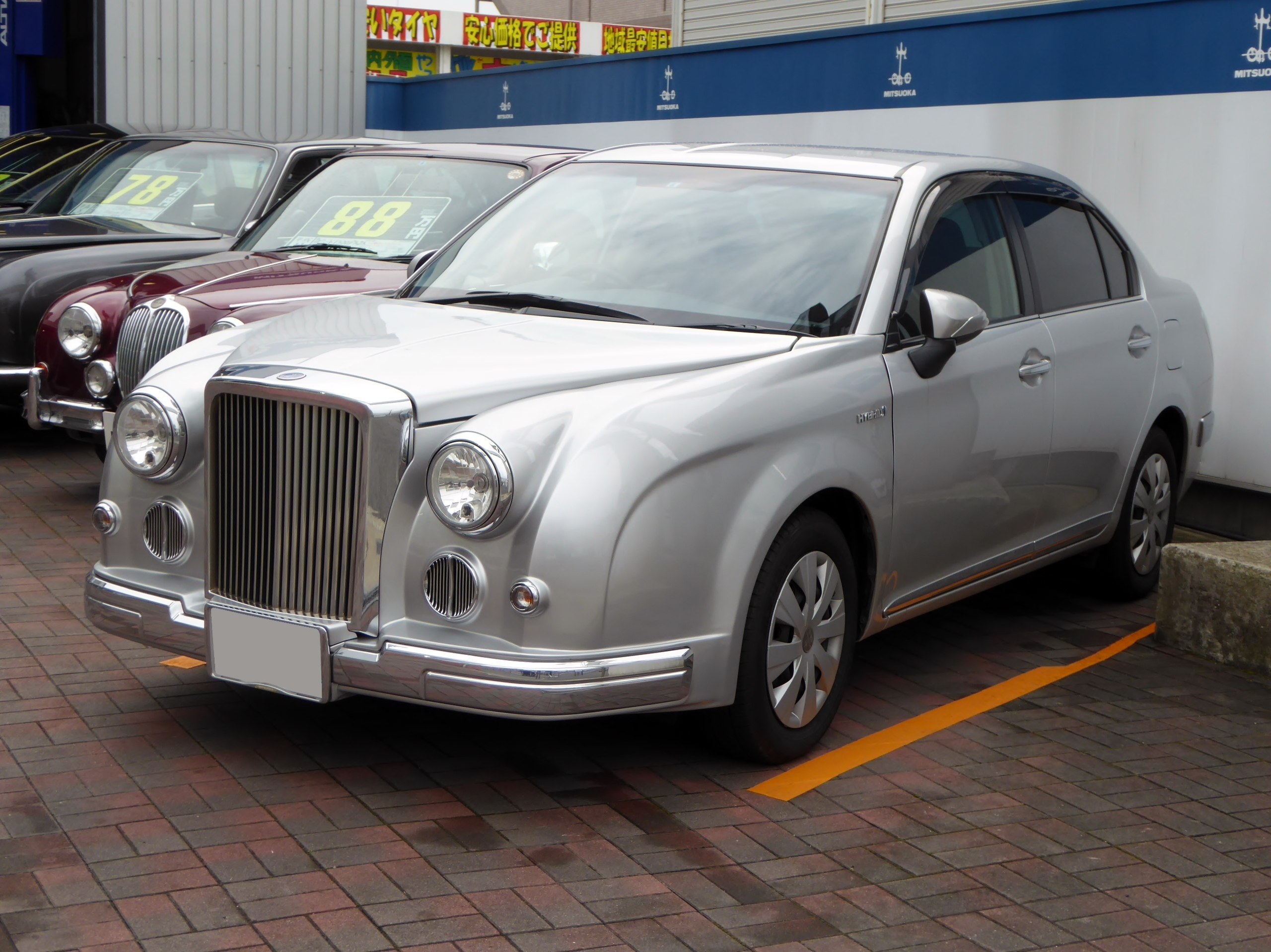
Mitsuoka Motor Ryugi hybrid (E165)

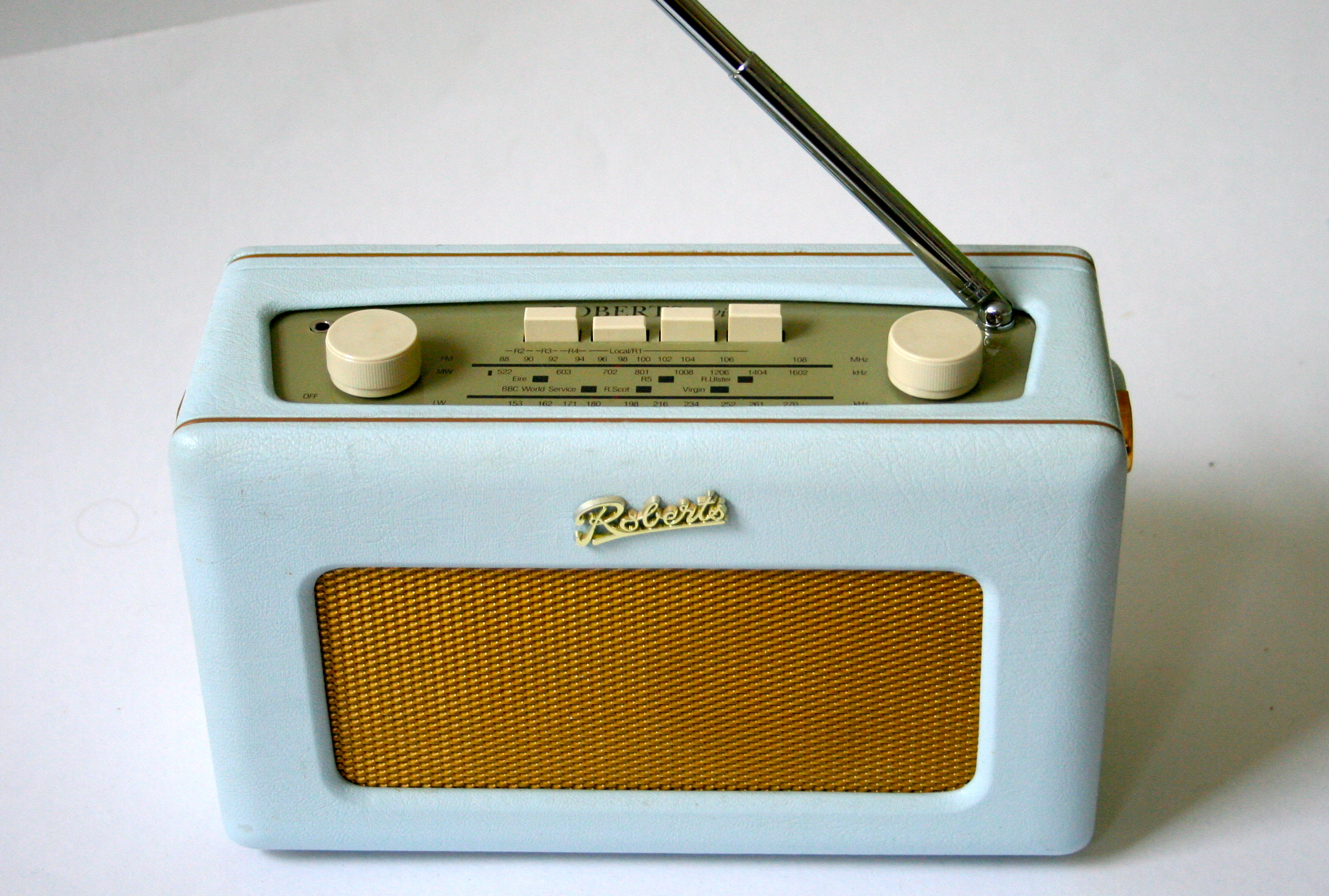
Roberts Revival radio based on 1960s design

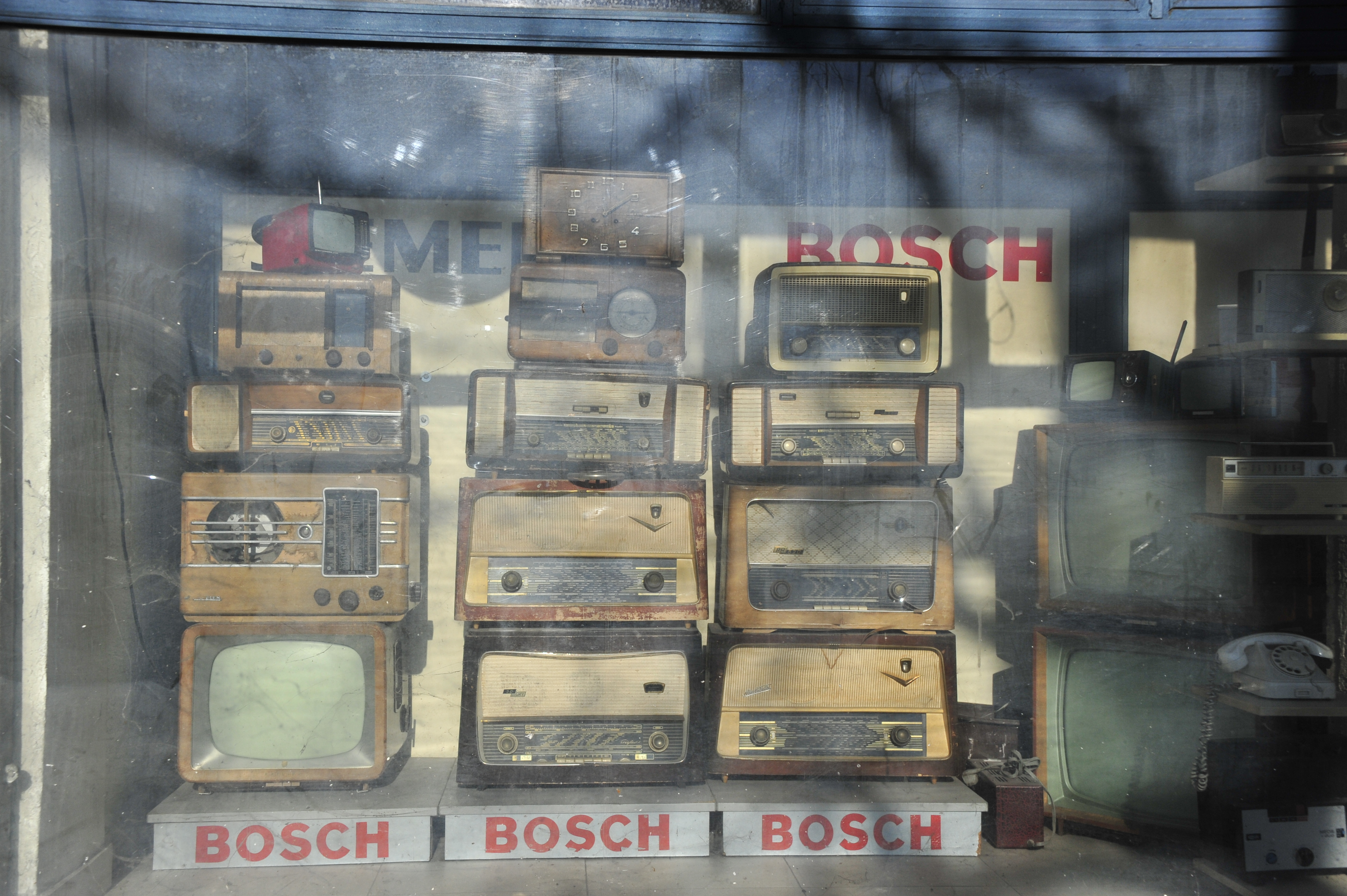
A display of vintage transistor radios and televisions

Since the 1980s, the implications of the word retro have been expanding in the application to different mediums. Several fields have adopted the term from the design field.

=== Objects ===
Until the 1960s, interiors were often decorated with antiques. During the 1960s in London, shops started selling pieces of second-hand furniture. These shops differed from the previous antique shops because they sold daily life objects from the recent past. These objects used to be seen as junk: Victorian enamel signs, stuffed bears, old furniture painted with union jacks, bowler hats etc. A new way of producing and consuming the past emerged and a broader range of objects from the recent past was used for new designs.

Before the word retro came into use in the 1970s, the practice of adopting old styles for new designs was already common. Throughout the 19th and 20th centuries, designers borrowed from the past, for example, classicistic style. The difference is that since the 1960s, people started to refer to the recent past.

In the 1980s, design history emerged as a discipline and several histories of design were published. The access to these overviews and the ability to experiment with computer design programs has caused an increase of retro designed objects in the last decades.

=== Interior design ===
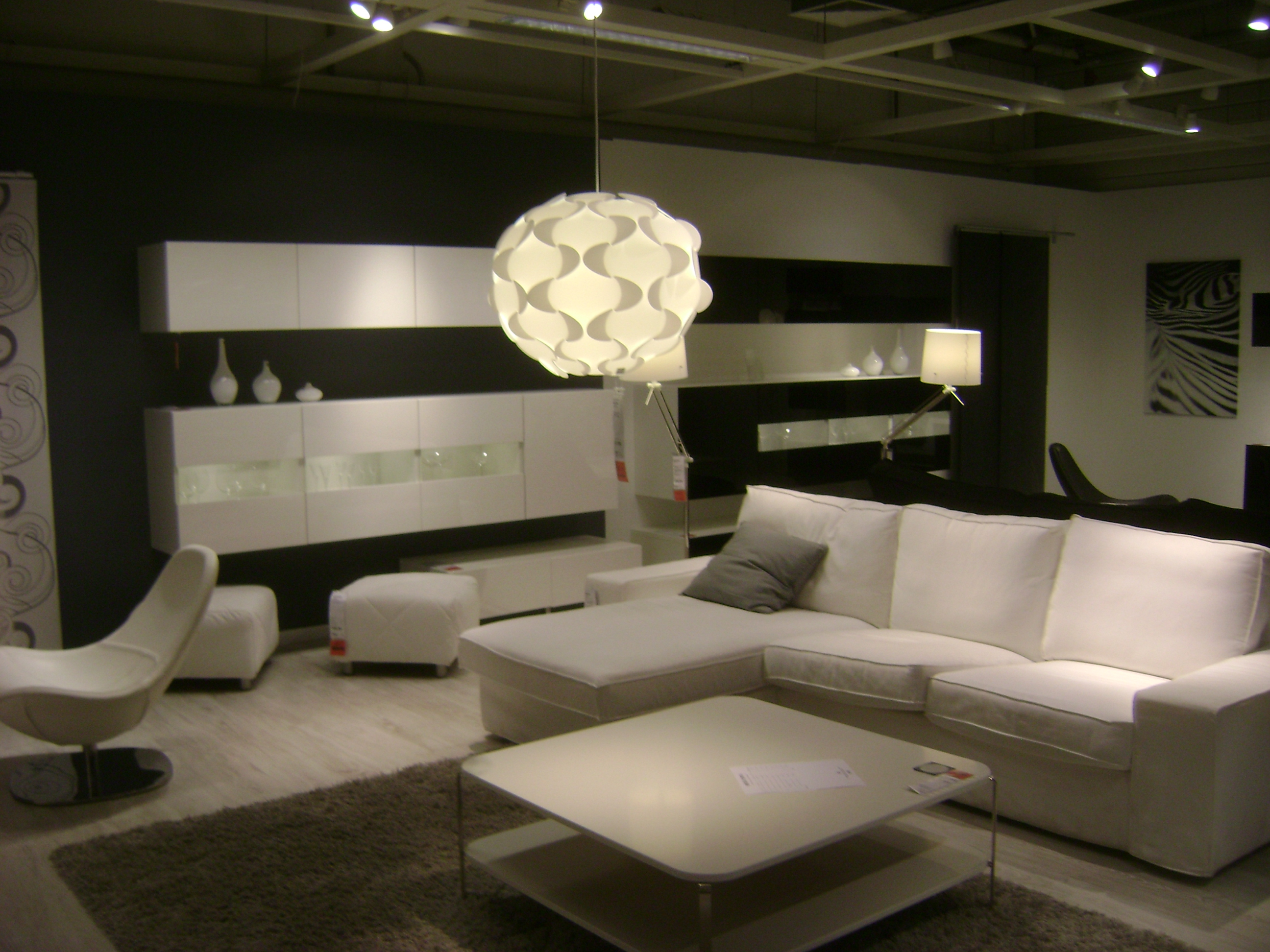
Retro lamp by IKEA, referring to the 1970s

Interior design magazines often show retro style as an interior decoration of mixed styles and objects from the past, second hand and new. For example, 1970s patterned wallpapers, combined with second-hand furniture also from the 1970s, the 1960s, or the 1950s. The value of old artifacts has increased, because the objects used to be considered old-fashioned and every day. In this case 'retro' indicates a value, which is also partly why today's retailers produce new objects in an old style.

=== Graphic design, typography, and packaging ===
Long before the use of the word retro, graphic design made reference to earlier graphic characteristics. William Morris can be seen as an example: for book design and other purposes he adopted Medieval production and stylistic models in 1891. Furthermore, in the beginning of the twentieth century, Gothic, Baroque and Rococo motifs were used for new products.

In typography, classicism has always been an influence and throughout the 20th century, and in early woodcut printing as well. The introduction of the technique of photocomposition in the 1960s allowed typographers greater flexibility in the selection and arrangement of type styles and sizes. For example, psychedelic typefaces were developed, gaining inspiration from Art Nouveau and other cultures. Historicist styles are also used in the promotion and packaging of food and household products, referring to childhood memories and domestic nostalgic ideals.

In logo designing, retro logos have been highlighted. Brands have incorporated retro logo designs to highlight their brand's voice and message: clean, classic, and reminiscent of the recent past.

=== Fashion design ===
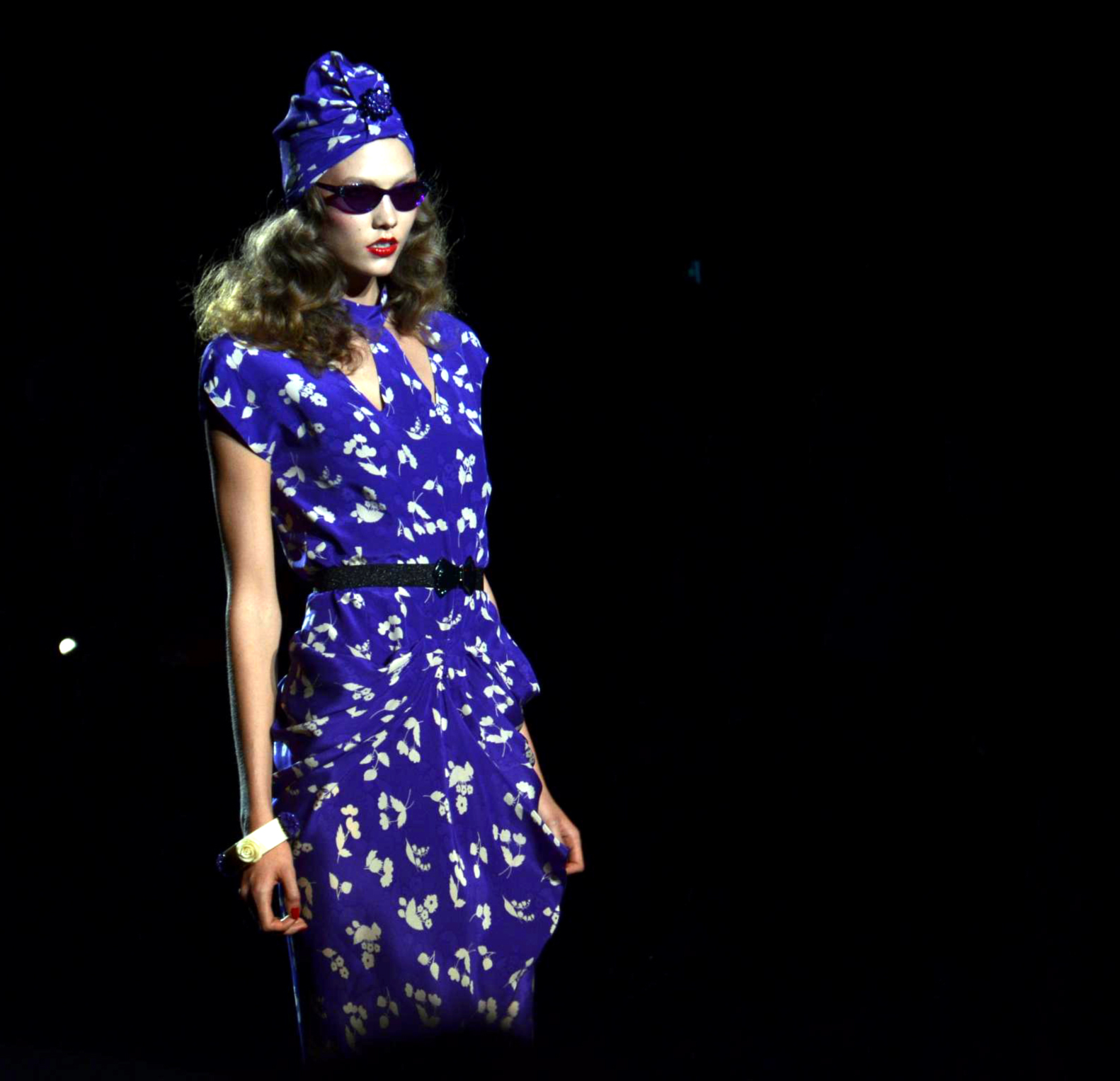
A 1940s retro-style dress with turban, designed in a modern electric blue, modeled by Karlie Kloss at a 2011 Anna Sui show

In the 2000s and 2010s, there was a revival of pastel and neon colors, stereotypically associated with 1980s and early 1990s fashion (with the 1980s pastel revival being a rebirth of a 1950s trend). Also at this time, late 1980s-style high-waisted mom jeans made a comeback with female hipsters. In the 2010s and 2020s, 1990s fashion has made a comeback: many of the fabrics and patterns ubiquitous in that decade (such as crushed velvet and floral) are popular now, and Dr. Martens, a shoe brand popular in the 1990s, also made a strong comeback in the early 2010s, as 2011–12 was the British company's best-selling season of all time.

=== Retro art ===
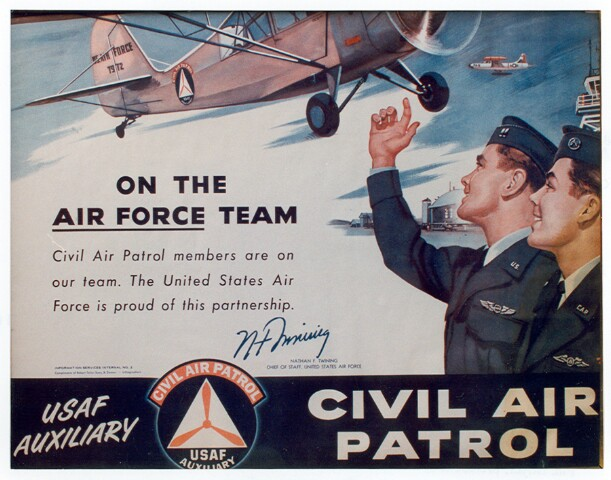
A 1950s-era poster in pop-art style, on which retro art is based

The style now called retro art is a genre of pop art which was developed from the 1940s to 1960s, in response to a need for bold, eye-catching graphics that were easy to reproduce on simple presses available at the time in major centres. Retro advertising art has experienced a resurgence in popularity since its style is distinctive from modern computer-generated styling. Contemporary artist Anne Taintor uses retro advertising art as the centerpiece for her ongoing commentary on the modern woman. Specific styling features include analog machine design and vintage television programs.

A famous example of a retro pop-art character is the more generalized form of the Ward Cleaver-styled J. R. "Bob" Dobbs-esque icon which has been widely played off, copied, and parodied.

=== Media and culture ===
==== Film, music, fashion, and television ====
Foreshadowed by the Mothers of Invention album Cruising with Ruben & the Jets in 1968 and the parody group Sha Na Na in 1969, the 1970s and 1980s brought about a 1950s–early 1960s revival, with films and television shows such as American Graffiti, M*A*S*H, Grease, Happy Days, and Peggy Sue Got Married, set in this time period.

==== Retro gaming ====
Retro gaming is a pastime which is becoming increasingly popular where individuals play video games on vintage computers or a classic game consoles. What constitutes a vintage or retro machine is sometimes open to debate, but typically, most retro gamers are interested in Commodore 64, Amiga 500, Atari 2600, Famicom/NES, Mega Drive/Sega Genesis, PlayStation, Nintendo 64, Dreamcast, Super Famicom/Super NES, and classic Game Boy games and consoles. Emulation often plays a part in retro gaming if the original hardware is unavailable.

==== Online aesthetic ====
On Roblox, some users have shown an affinity for a particular 'early Roblox' or 'retro' aesthetic for games and avatar clothing. The style features memorabilia from notable classic games and characters, primarily from the platform's late 2000s era, which are considered iconic within the community.

==== Sports ====
In 2025, the Philippine Basketball Association (PBA) celebrated its 50th anniversary by airing their basketball match between San Miguel Beermen and Meralco Bolts in a style reminiscent of the league's early years, with on-screen graphics and player jerseys evoking that of the era.

=== Aircraft ===
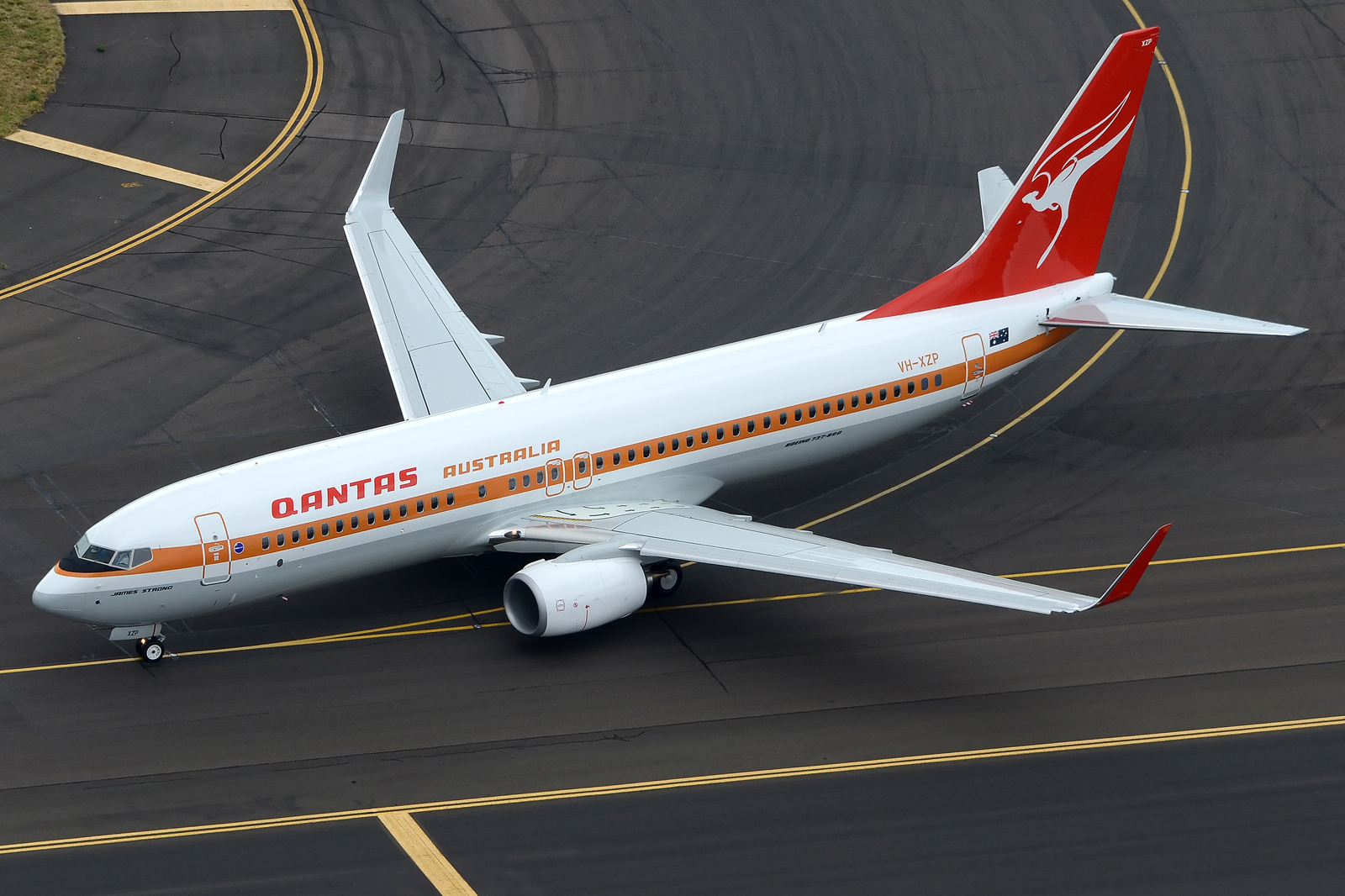
A Qantas Boeing 737-800 (VH-XZP) retrojet seen at Sydney Airport

A handful of airlines have chosen to paint a historical livery on a single selected aircraft in their modern fleet, typically as a marketing device or to commemorate an anniversary.

=== By country and era ===
In Japan, Shōwa retro is retro related to the Shōwa era, and Heisei retro is retro related to the Heisei era.

== See also ==
- List of retro style video game consoles
- List of retro-style digital cameras
- Nostalgia
- Retrofuturism
- Retrotronics
- Retro-style automobile
- Steampunk
- Throwback uniform
- Vintage (design)
