= Raygun Gothic =

Retrofuturist visual style

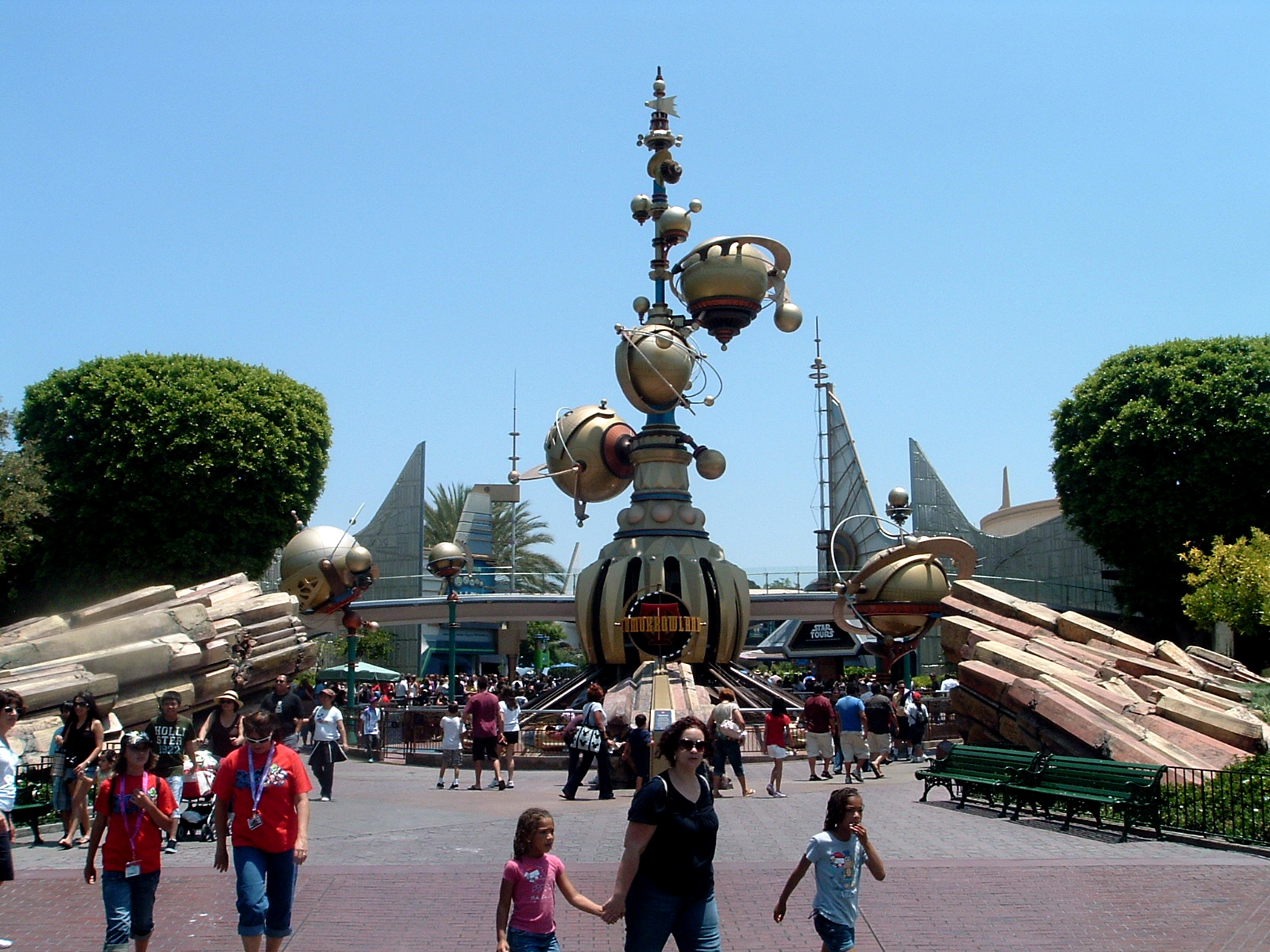
Tomorrowland (Disney Parks)

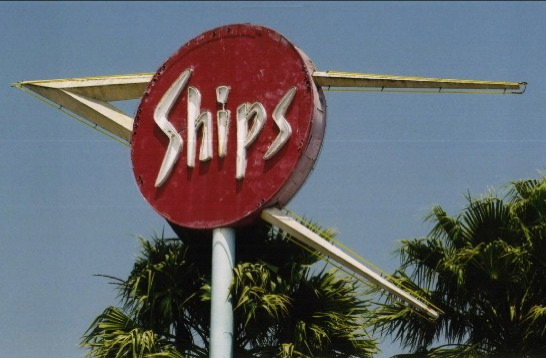
A 1950s coffee shop sign evocative of then-nascent spaceflight on Olympic Boulevard in Los Angeles.

Raygun Gothic is a catchall term for a visual and architectural style that, when applied to retrofuturistic science fiction environments, incorporates various aspects of the Googie, Streamline Moderne, and Art Deco architectural styles. Academic Lance Olsen has characterised Raygun Gothic as "a tomorrow that never was". The term was coined by William Gibson in his 1981 story "The Gernsback Continuum".

The style has also been associated with architectural indulgence, and situated in the context of the golden age of modern design due to its use of features such as "single-support beams, acute angles, brightly colored paneling", as well as "shapes and cutouts showing motion".

== See also ==
- Mid-century modern
- Populuxe
- Space Age
- Tomorrowland
- Atompunk
- Dieselpunk
