= Populuxe =

US consumer culture and aesthetic (1950s–1960s)

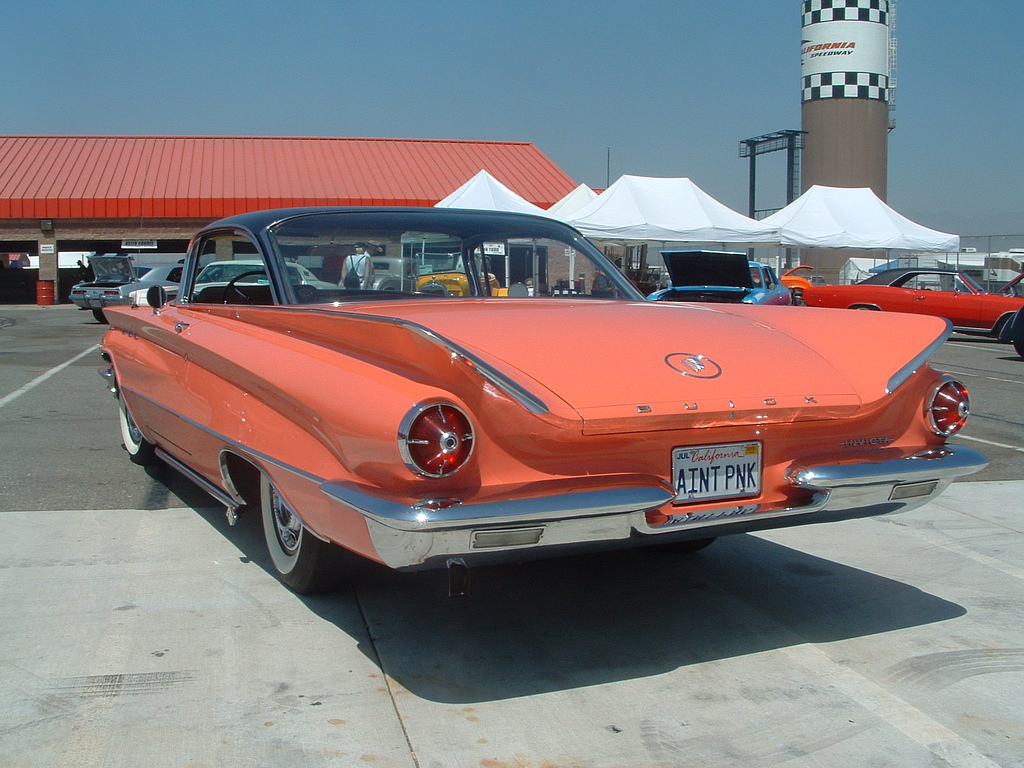
Example of the futuristic aesthetic of Populuxe.

Populuxe was a consumer culture and aesthetic in the United States popular in the 1950s and 1960s. The term populuxe is a portmanteau of popular and luxury.

== Description ==
The style evoked a sense of luxury with the design of consumer goods such as radios and clocks typically featuring pastel-colored plastic in curved and angular shapes and metalized plastic trim that simulated chrome. Structures commonly used pastels, geometric shapes, and surfaces of stucco, sheet metal, and often stainless steel.

Populuxe emerged after people began seeing semi-luxury commodities as luxury ware and mass consumer goods. It is also interpreted as a mass culture that desired luxury finishes on everyday material goods. It is said to be an offshoot of Fordism in the early 20th century and was also facilitated by the start of the emulative celebrity culture.

The work of various artists, designers, graphic designers, furniture designers, interior designers, and architects is associated with the populuxe movement. Populuxe is associated with consumerism and overlaps with mid-century modern architecture, Streamline Moderne, Googie architecture (Doo Wop architecture), and other futuristic and Space Age influenced design aesthetics that were futurist, technology-focused, and optimistic in nature.

== See also ==
- Mass affluent
- Mass luxury
- Raygun Gothic
- The Brave Little Toaster (novel)
