= Retrotronics =

Making of electric devices using older components

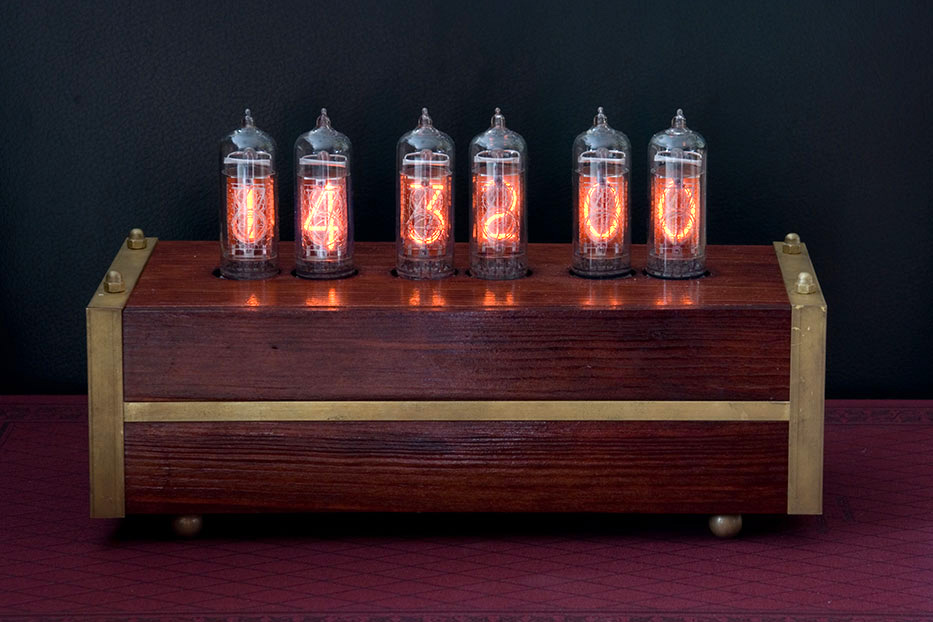
Nixie clock

Retrotronics (a portmanteau of "retro" and "electronics", also retro-tronics) is the making of electric circuits or appliances using older electric components, such as vacuum tubes, Nixie displays, relays, uniselectors, analogue meters, etc. These are usually chosen more for their aesthetic qualities than performance.

Retrotronics is a popular strand within the steampunk movement. At the Oxford exhibition of Steampunk art, a third of the works on show had a strong retrotronic influence, from light fittings of period components through to computer keyboards and webcams of burnished copper and brass. Outside steampunk, similar influences are found amongst the retro-futurist scene. Other sources cite the Maker movement as an influence.

A recent musical trend has sought to recapture early 1980s 8-bit game and synthesiser sounds, often referred to as chiptune. Artists such as Kid Carpet perform entire sets on children's toys or pocket synths of the period. Other artists, such as Nullsleep, perform using only period video game hardware. DJs offer dance music events built from samples of period games or gadgets.

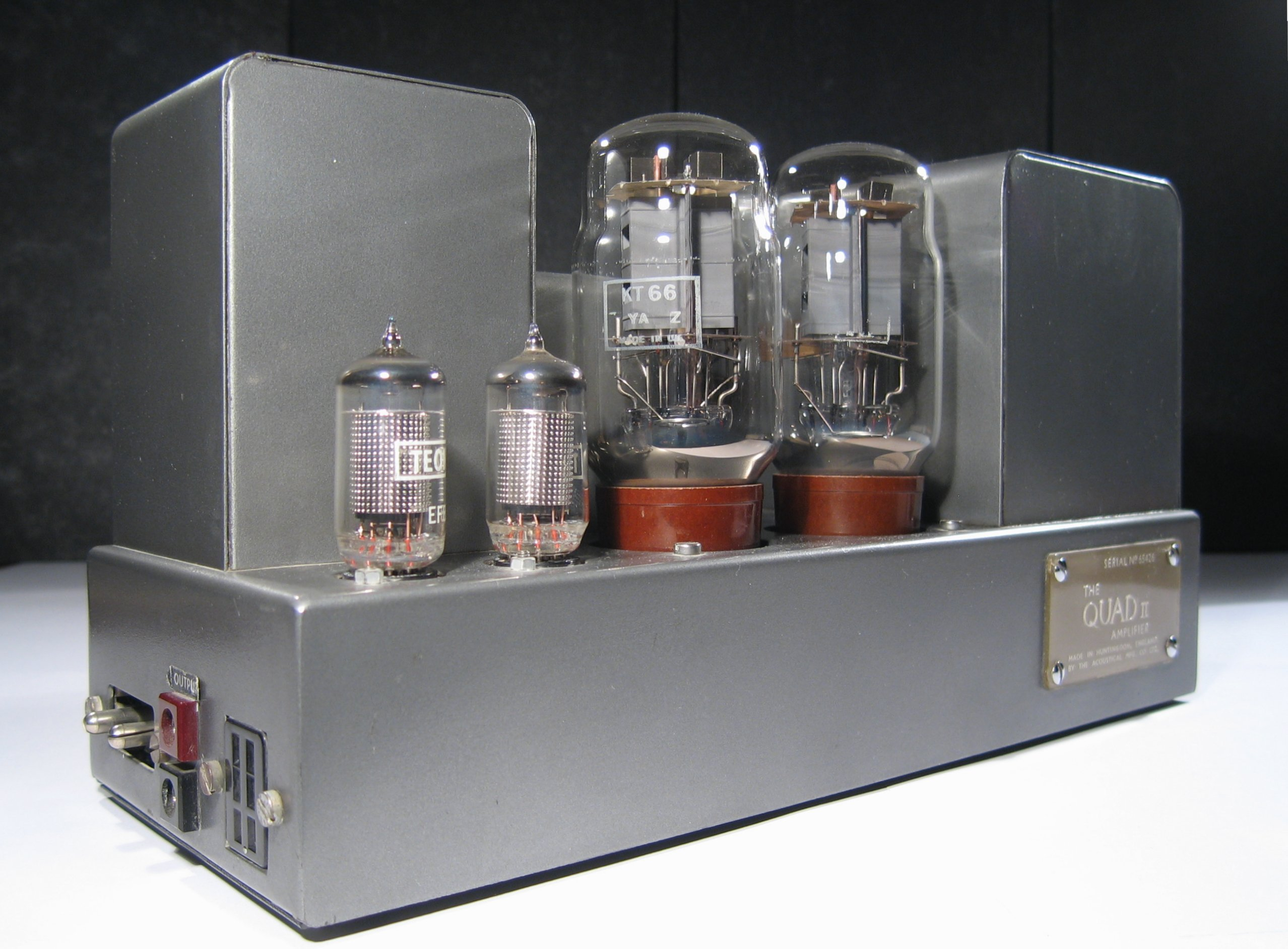
Quad II power amplifier

Some audiophiles and electric guitarists also favour the use of valve (vacuum tube) amplifiers, on the ground of sound quality or particular "colour". This is still within the scope of retrotronics, but is on a functional ground, rather than aesthetic. Designs of the 1960s are highly sought after today, and still support a market in manufacturing new valves and replacing time-expired components such as electrolytic capacitors.

In the audiophile world, such popularity is justified on the basis of sound quality; the earlier valve amplifier designs were free of such artifacts as crossover distortion that beset the early bipolar transistor designs of the 1960s. Despite more recent designs that have removed these problems, the "valve sound" is still preferred by some, who will pay large amounts to achieve it. It's also notable that almost all recent audiophile valve amplifiers make a deliberate display of their valves and place them visibly on show.

Another trend is the mixing of tubes with more up-to-date circuitry; these systems are referred to as a "hybrid systems". For example, in the Netherlands, the TubeSociety employs this technique.

Amongst guitarists, the goal of a "valve sound" is different, a deliberate distortion effect achieved through either over-driving valves, or through microphonics, the valve's sensitivity to air vibration as well as electrical signals. Original, or reproduction, guitar amplifiers such as the Vox AC30 now command a premium price. A few guitarists are collecting germanium transistors, and built effect pedals with them, because of the distorted "older rock" sound of effect pedals built with early germanium transistors.

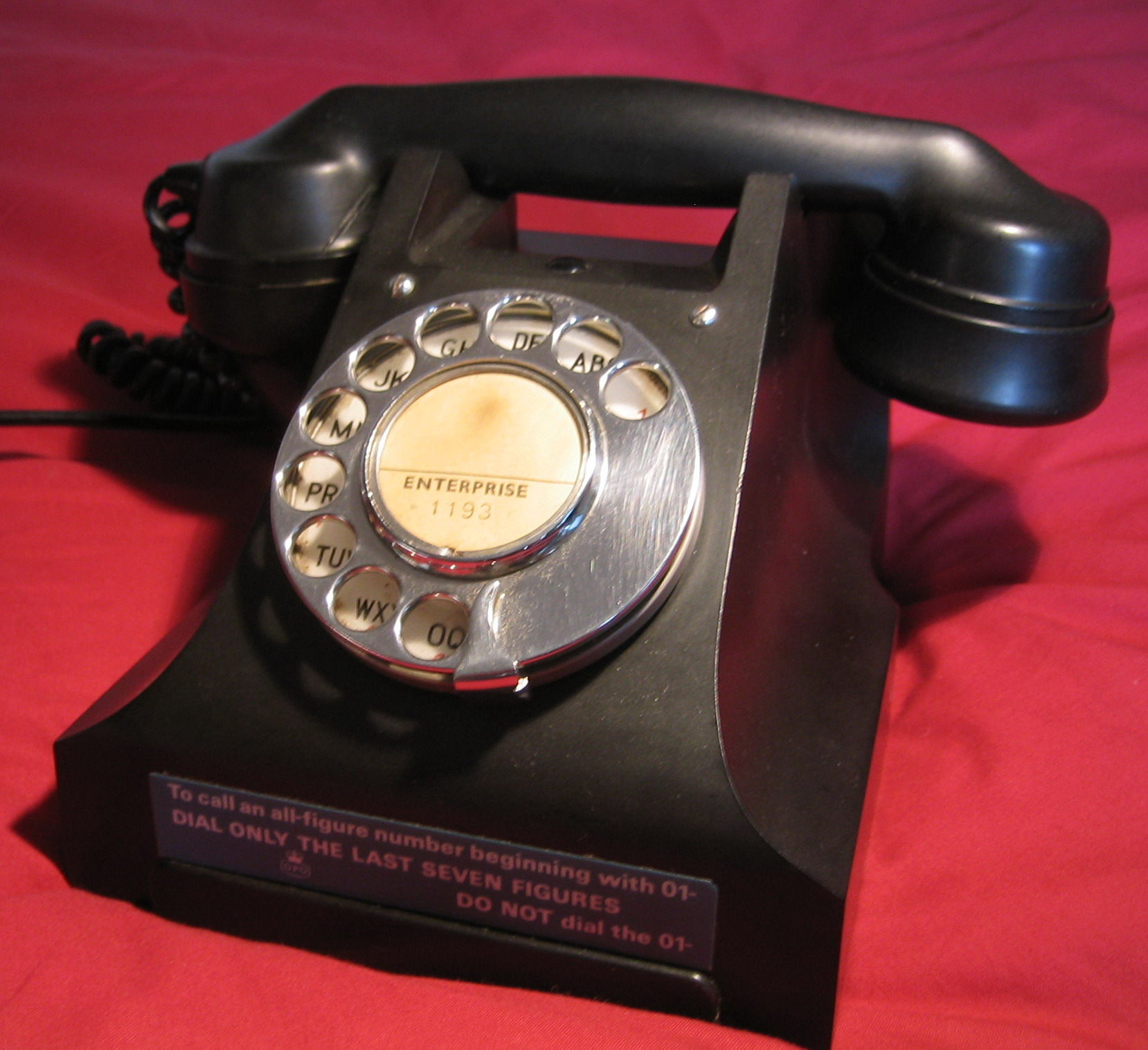
UK 300 series telephone

One of the earlier examples of widespread retrotronics was the resurgent popularity of black Bakelite telephones in the UK. In the early 1980s, the UK domestic telephone market was deregulated and for the first time it was possible to legally purchase telephones outright and install them at home through a simple plug and socket. As well as the expected rush for modern lightweight handsets, there was also a brisk trade in 300 series telephones, refurbished internally to modern standards, but as a functional decorator item that appeared unchanged from the 1930s.

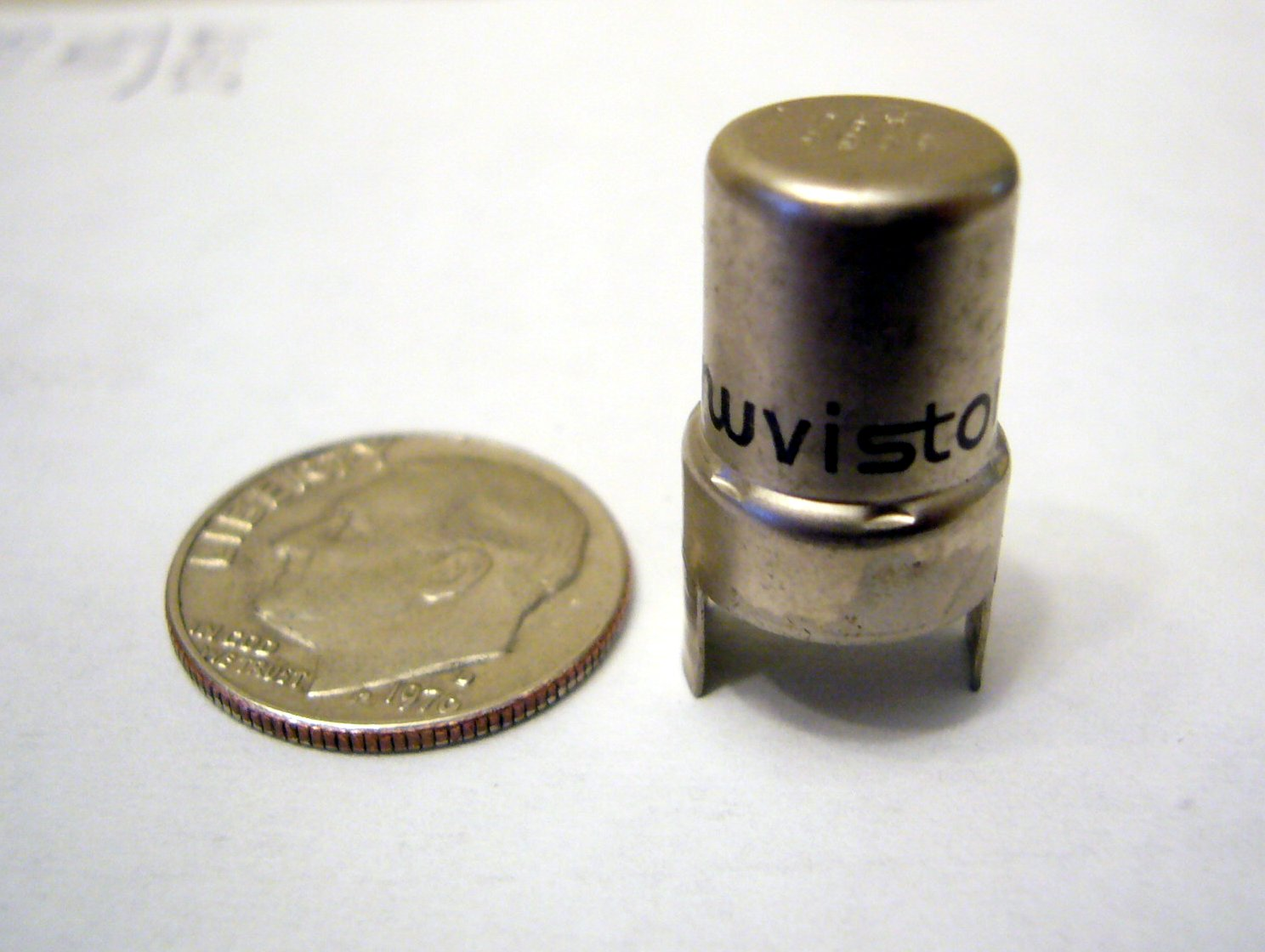
Nuvistor
