= Eicher Polaris Multix =

Overview
- Type: Personal utility vehicle
- Manufacturer: Eicher Motors & Polaris India
- Production: August 2015 – March 2018
- Model years: 2015-2018
- Assembly: Kukas, Jaipur, Rajasthan, India
- Designer: Polaris Industries

Body and chassis
- Class: Personal utility vehicle
- Body style: 4-door
- Layout: Front-engine, rear-wheel-drive layout

Powertrain
- Engine: 511 cm^{3} (31.18 cu in): Greaves four-stroke single-cylinder BS III (diesel)
- Transmission: Manual

Dimensions
- Wheelbase: 2,005 mm (78.94 in)
- Length: 3,235 mm (127.36 in)
- Width: 1,585 mm (62.40 in)
- Height: 1,856 mm (73.07 in)
- Curb weight: 650 & 750 kg

The Eicher Polaris Multix (or Multix) is a personal utility vehicle manufactured by Eicher Motors and Polaris India (the Indian arm of Polaris Inc.). The vehicle was announced in June 2015, and the first vehicle was delivered on 26 August 2015. Multix is promoted by its manufacturer as "India's first personal utility vehicle", able to be used as a people carrier, a cargo carrier and also a power generator.

== History ==
In July 2012, Eicher Motors and Polaris Inc. formed a 50:50 joint venture (JV) to manufacture vehicles in India. This JV was formed with an initial investment of ₹350 crore (equivalent to ₹660 crore or US$68.5 million in 2023) and the new company was named "Eicher Polaris Pvt. Ltd." Thereafter, Eicher Motors and Polaris Industries combined their research and development facilities in their new manufacturing plant in Kukas, Jaipur, Rajasthan, India.

In May 2018, Eicher and Polaris announced they were closing down the Indian-joint venture, and discontinuing the Multix.

== Design ==
The Multix was designed with the aim of being used for both family and business purposes, and has been called a "3-in-1" vehicle. Its cargo capacity is 400 litres. Multix also generates 3 kilowatts of electricity and can thus be used as a power generator as well.

=== Variants ===
The Multix has two variants, the AX+ and the MX. With the exception of doors (and the overall weight of the vehicle), both the variants are identical. AX+ has open doorways, whilst MX has doors. The curb weight of the MX is 100 kg more than that of AX+.

== Availability ==
As of October 2015, 30 JV dealerships had been set up to sell Multix models, in Andhra Pradesh, Bihar, Gujarat, Maharashtra, Rajasthan, Tamil Nadu and Uttar Pradesh. Eicher Polaris Pvt. Ltd plans to have dealerships throughout India by mid-2017.

Four colors were available as of June 2015.

The first Multix vehicle was sold in August 2015, to Ganesh Narayan Choudhary. The company expects to sell 60,000 vehicles per year.

=== Financing ===
Eicher Polaris Pvt. Ltd has contracted with Cholamandalam Investment, and as of August 2015 was in negotiations with a number of other financial institutions, to provide financing to customers wanting to buy a Multix AX+ or MX.

== Reception ==
As a new entrant in the Indian automotive market, the Eicher Motors-Polaris India partnership is expected to face challenges in establishing its brand. G. Balachandar of The Hindu referred to the Multix as able to convert from "a small car with space for family of 5 [to] a small truck with storage space" and said the innovative vehicle would "create its own segment of buyers." Another article in The Hindu's "Business Line" praised the Multix's "smooth ride" and ability to "handl[e] rough terrain", and suggested it could "replace other mobility options" such as trucks, tractors and traditional automobiles. Santanu Choudhury, blogging for The Wall Street Journal, noted that the Multix was both small enough to give buyers the maneuverability needed for narrow or congested streets, and equipped to handle adverse road conditions including severe ruts and minor flooding. He also praised the possibilities opened up by the Multix's power generation capability, suggesting it could be used "to light up homes, power tools or even run a DJ console."

== Specifications ==
Multix AX+

- Seating capacity: 5 (including driver)
- Displacement: 511 cm^{3}
- Max Engine power: 9.78 Bhp
- Max Torque: 27.1 Nm @ 1,400 rpm
- Wheel base: 2,005 mm
- Length: 3,235 mm
- Width: 1,585 mm
- Height: 1,856 mm
- Curb weight: 650 kg
- Engine: Greaves four-stroke single-cylinder BS III
- Fuel: Diesel
- Ground clearance: 225 mm
- Cargo capacity: 1,918 liters
- Transmission: four-speed manual

== See also ==
- Eicher Motors
- Polaris Inc.
