= Vikram Lal =

Indian businessman (born 1942)

- Born: 1942 (age 83–84)
- Education: Technische Universität Darmstadt
- Occupation: Businessman
- Title: Founder of Eicher Motors
- Spouse: Anita Lal
- Children: 3, including Siddhartha Lal
- Website: www.eicher.in

Vikram Lal (born 1942) is an Indian businessman. Lal is the founder and former CEO of Eicher Motors, an Indian commercial vehicle manufacturer based in New Delhi, India. He has been a member of the board of directors of The Doon School. As per the Forbes list of India's 100 richest tycoons, as of 9 October 2024, Vikram Lal and his family are ranked 31st with a net worth of $8.8 billion.

== Early life and education ==
Vikram Lal was born in 1942. He studied mechanical engineering at the Technische Universität Darmstadt.

== Business career ==
In 1966, Lal joined Eicher India, part of his family owned companies established by his father, Man Mohan Lal, in 1948. Eicher started as the first tractor manufacturer in India in 1959 under the company name Eicher Tractor Corporation of India Pvt. Ltd., as a joint venture with German tractor manufacturer Eicher, and eventually branched out into light commercial vehicles in 1986, and then into heavy vehicles. In 1985, he took a step back in detailed management of his companies as result of a heart bypass, which also contributed to his later decision of handing over management control of his companies to professionals. In 1997, Lal retired from all executive roles in his companies and handed control over to professional managers.

== Personal life ==
Lal is married to Anita Lal and they have 3 children. Anita founded the lifestyle brand Good Earth. His son, Siddhartha Lal, became CEO of Eicher Motors in 2006. One of his daughters, Simran, runs the family's two lifestyle brands, Good Earth and Nicobar. Lal spends his retirement years volunteering at his own Goodearth Education Foundation.
