= Arya College =

Group of private colleges in Jaipur, India

Arya Group of Colleges
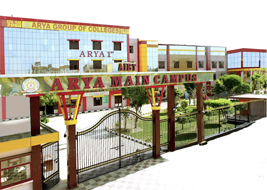
- Entrance to the Kukas campus
- Other name: Arya College
- Type: Private
- Established: 2000; 26 years ago
- Founder: T. K. Agarwal
- Accreditation: NAAC
- Affiliations: Rajasthan Technical University
- Chairman: Arvind Agarwal
- Location: SP-40, RIICO Industrial Area, Kukas, Jaipur, Rajasthan, India; 27.0310°N 75.8940°E
- Campus: Suburban
- Website: www.aryacollege.org
- Location in Rajasthan Location in India

Arya Group of Colleges, also known as Arya College, is a group of private colleges at Kukas, on the Delhi road north-east of Jaipur, Rajasthan, India. Its institutions offer undergraduate and postgraduate programmes in engineering, management and pharmacy, and undergraduate degrees in arts, science and business administration. The engineering and management programmes are affiliated with Rajasthan Technical University (RTU), Kota, and approved by the All India Council for Technical Education (AICTE); the pharmacy programmes are approved by the Pharmacy Council of India.

== History ==
The group was established in 1999 under the aegis of the All India Arya Samajis Society for Higher & Technical Education by its founder chairman, T. K. Agarwal, an engineer from the University of Roorkee (now IIT Roorkee). Arvind Agarwal is the group's chairman. Its first college opened at Kukas in 2000. Further engineering, management, pharmacy and degree colleges were added in the following years.

== Institutions ==
- Arya College of Engineering (ACE) – engineering and management.
- Arya Institute of Engineering & Technology (AIET) – B.Tech, M.Tech and MBA programmes.
- Arya College of Pharmacy (ACP) – diploma, bachelor's and master's programmes in pharmacy.
- Arya PG College (APGC) – established in 2017; offers BA, BSc and BBA degrees.

== Academics ==
Undergraduate engineering programmes lead to the Bachelor of Technology (B.Tech) degree, with branches including computer science and engineering, artificial intelligence and data science, information technology, electronics and communication engineering, electrical engineering and mechanical engineering; the Master of Technology (M.Tech) is offered in computer science and engineering. The Master of Business Administration (MBA) is offered with specialisations in business analytics, finance, human resources, marketing, information technology, and operations and supply chain management. Degrees in engineering and management are awarded by Rajasthan Technical University.

== Accreditation and rankings ==
In the Quality Index Value (QIV) assessment of affiliated colleges for the 2021–22 session, Rajasthan Technical University ranked Arya Institute of Engineering & Technology sixth, with a QIV of 801.

The group states that it holds an A+ accreditation from the National Assessment and Accreditation Council (NAAC).

== Campus ==
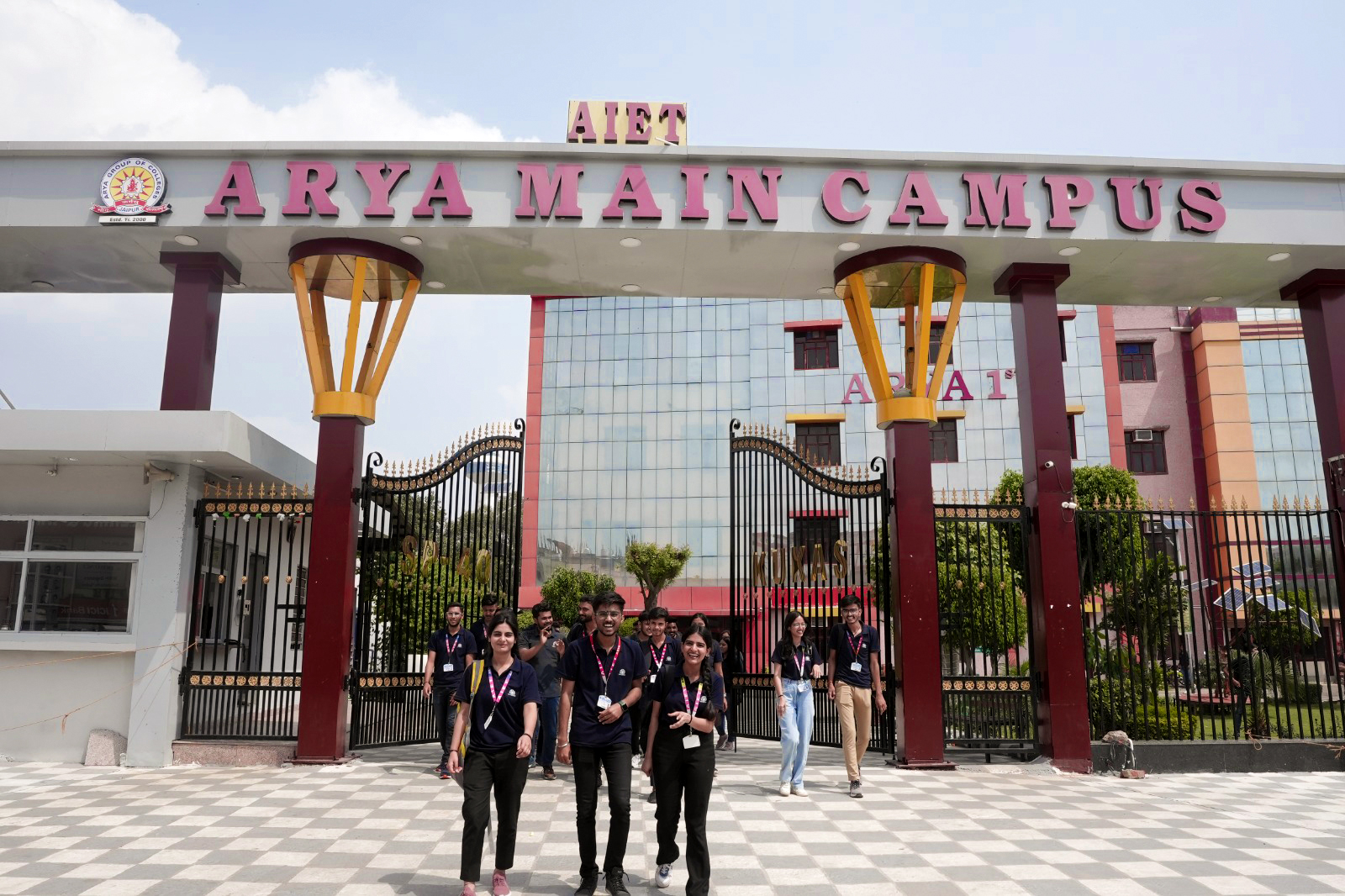
Arya Institute of Engineering & Technology building at Kukas

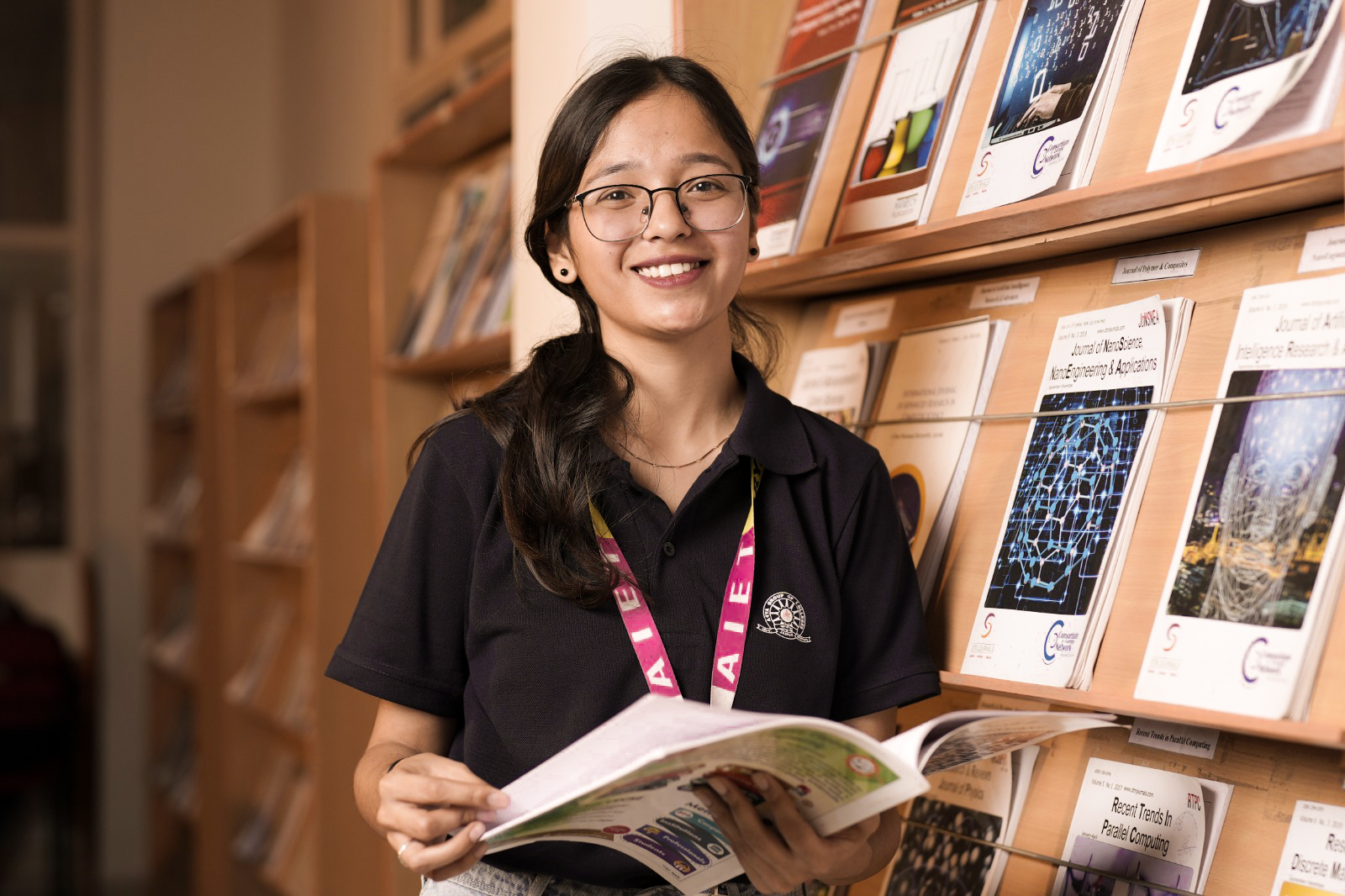
Library at the Kukas campus

The campus is at plot SP-40 in the RIICO Industrial Area at Kukas, on the Jaipur–Delhi road.
