= Atlantic City Police Department =

- Abbreviation: ACPD

Jurisdictional structure
- Operations jurisdiction: Atlantic City, New Jersey, U.S.
- Area: 17 square miles (44 km^{2})
- Population: 39,558
- General nature: Local civilian police

Operational structure
- Headquarters: Atlantic City, New Jersey
- Agency executive: James Sarkos, Police Chief

Website
- Atlantic City Police Department site

The Atlantic City Police Department is a municipal law enforcement agency that serves Atlantic City, New Jersey. The department is currently headed by Chief of Police James Sarkos.

The department includes a Patrol Unit, Traffic Unit (made up of a Motorcycle Unit and an Accident Investigation Unit) and a K-9 Unit. Other divisions are Investigations, Vice, Support and Internal Affairs.

== History ==
In 1907 the Police Department was established in Atlantic City by ordinance number sixteen.

In 1855, William S. Cazier was the first “constable of the surf” and he patrolled the city's beaches.

The first female as a member of a police force for all of New Jersey was Margaret Creswell. She began her Atlantic City police officer career in 1924.

The first police chief was Barton Gaskill, 1870; followed by: John R Lake, 1872; Simon L. Wescoat, 1874; John Hamon, 1876; Simon L. Wescoat, 1877; Joseph T. Note, 1880; Charles R. Lacy, 1881; George B. Zane, 1882; James Robinson, 1883; Harry C. Eldridge, 1887; George W. France, 1887; Harry C. Eldridge, 1890; Charles W. Maxwell, 1906; Malcolm B. Woodruff, 1906; Robert C. Miller, 1916; Patrick J. Doran, 1924; James A. McMenamin, 1934; Earl W. Butcher, special deputy chief, 1941; Arthur F. Higbee, 1943; Samuel H. G. Weakley, 1943; Harry Saunders, 1944; Earl W. Butcher, Acting Police Chief, 1951; Mario Floriani, Acting Police Chief 1964, his career ended as chief in 1969 when he was appointed in 1972 to City Commission. Mario Floriani was also Atlantic County Sheriff; William Cade, 1969, helped institute the K9 Corps; William tenBrink, 1974 to 1978, was the city's chief of police when Atlantic City's first casino (Resorts) opened, but died later that year at age 40. Joseph Allmond, was Atlantic City's first black police chief. Almond retired in 1984; Joseph Pasquale, 1984 to 1990; Robert McDuffie, April 1, 1990 to December 6, 1990; Nicholas Rifice, 1990 to 1996; James DiNoto, Acting Police Chief from 1996 to 1998; Benn Polk, 1998 to 2000; Arthur Snellbaker, 2000–2006; John Mooney, April 10, 2006 to May 27, 2010; Ernest C. Jubilee II, May 27, 2010 to Nov 2013; Henry White December 16, 2013 current Police Chief.

== Equipment ==
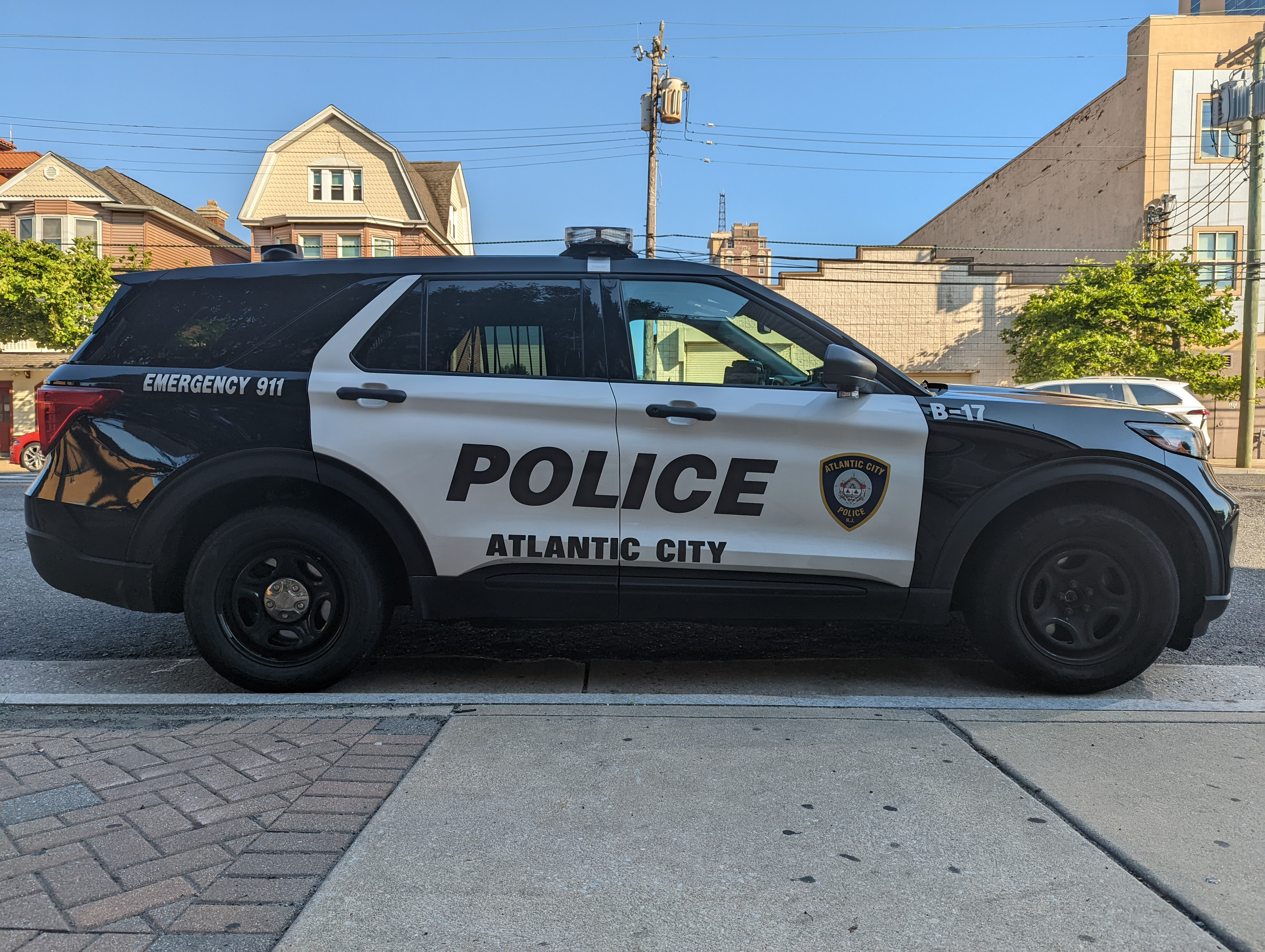
Patrol vehicle parked outside the central Atlantic City Police Station

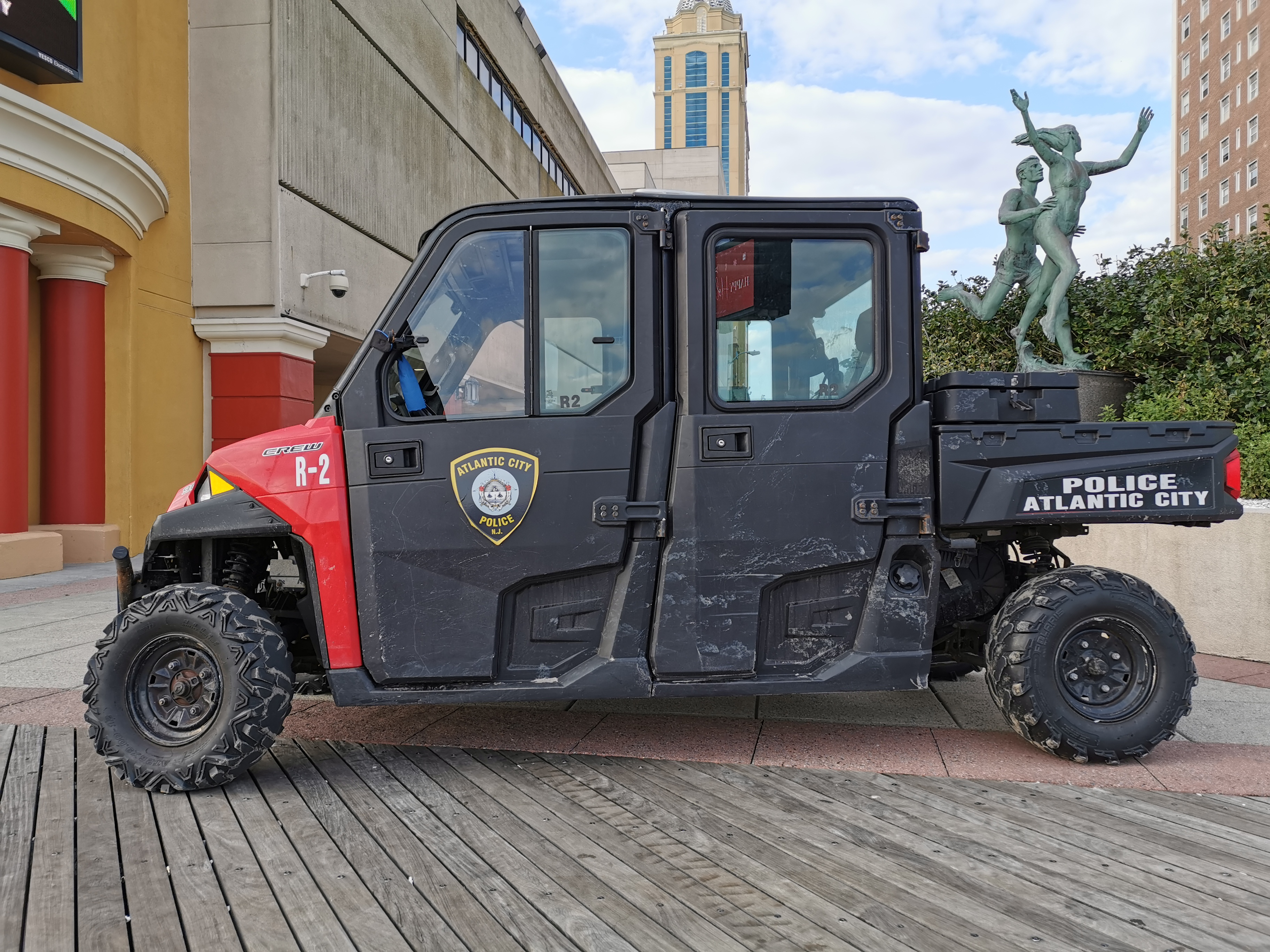
A Polaris Ranger Crew 900 EFI DOHC all-terrain vehicle patrols the boardwalk under the authority of the Atlantic City Police Department.

In mid-2014, the department began using 20 body cameras.

Officers are armed with Glock 22 .40 S&W pistols as the departments primary firearm. Detectives can carry the Glock 23 as well.

== Misconduct ==
On 23 November 2009, two Atlantic City policemen stopped two men on the street and detained them. The two officers reportedly made racial insults directed toward the men. An internal affairs investigation found the officers acted correctly. In October 2011, the two officers agreed to pay $360,000 to the men for violating their civil rights. Local newspapers did not name the two officers.

In June 2013, David Connor Castellani alleged police brutality after a verbal confrontation characterized in court as "Mouthing Off" to several police officers became an alleged act of "Street Justice" the officers were found to have acted correctly, as technically under the letter of the law, if Castellani had even dropped to the ground and rolled up in a fetal position that could have been considered resisting arrest, and all the actions and the force utilized by the officers would have still been appropriate until Castellani complied with their orders to submit to being taken into custody.

In April 2015 calling for an end to "incessant discovery disputes" over Atlantic City Police Department internal affairs files, a federal judge in Camden ordered the city to turn over every internal affairs file it generated from 2003 to 2014—roughly 2,000 files. U.S. Magistrate Judge Joel Schneider of the District of New Jersey ordered the across-the-board production of files, although Atlantic City police supervisors maintained that they followed the New Jersey Attorney General's Guidelines for Internal Affairs investigations, a comparison of their testimony to those guidelines revealed a flawed and shallow internal affairs process tailored to lead to exonerations of officers engaged in misconduct and raised serious questions about their credibility. Atlantic City's police department appeared to have had a flawed and shallow Internal Affairs process prior to Chief Henry White's reforms to the department, lacking objectivity and basic procedures which should have notified supervisors of the possibility that officers may be violating citizen's civil rights. The supervisors in Atlantic City were aware of the flaws and did nothing to correct them, sending the message to the members of their department that they would not be disciplined no matter how egregious the violation. Their confidence that they could assault citizens without fear of disciplinary action is best evidenced in the way that they assaulted and treated numerous individuals while fully aware that they were being recorded by casino surveillance cameras, and that even with such recorded evidence Internal Affairs would review the footage and exonerate them. Atlantic City's Internal Affairs process was characterized as the exact "facade to cover the violent behavioral patterns of police officers under investigation, to protect them from disciplinary action, and thereby perpetuate the City's custom of acquiescing in the excessive use of force by its police, the prior Chief testified that Internal Affairs: (1) reviews all internal complaints made against its officers, regardless of outcome, for evidence of pattern of misconduct; and (2) are required to review target officer's prior and subsequent Internal Affairs complaints to see if an officer has a pattern of misconduct. the prior Internal Affairs Captain specifically contradicted the Chief, testifying that the department did not have a "regular practice" to review an officer's prior and subsequent complaints to determine if a pattern of misconduct might exist, and did not do so on "a regular basis, this being in direct conflict with the New Jersey Attorney General's Guidelines for Internal Affairs Policy and Procedure, further testimony by the Chief And Captain revealed that the department's Internal Affairs Unit did not interview officers under investigation, resulting (not surprisingly) in either "Exonerated" or "Not Sustained" findings. Such shallow and inadequate investigations into police misconduct is direct evidence of deliberate indifference on the part of Atlantic City and its police department's staff and would most likely be sufficient to impose municipal liability on them. The Chief and Captain testified that officers were not routinely interviewed by Internal Affairs, and that the interview requirement in the Attorney General's Guidelines was "a suggestion" based on the "operative word "should", The Guidelines are clear that Internal Affairs should interview the officers under investigation as well as the Complainants and the Chief testified that the Guidelines provision that "Investigators should interview the complainant, all witnesses and the subject officer" was "a suggestion" and not "a requirement". The Internal Affairs Captain also disagreed with the provision, characterizing it as a "guideline" rather than a "requirement" based on the operative word "should." the Internal Affairs Captain considered the Guideline provision to be "an opinion." however the captain contradicted himself in other testimony that according to Atlantic City Police Internal guidelines "all efforts must be made to interview a complainant in person." The Guidelines are clear that Internal Affairs should review prior and subsequent Internal Affairs reports every time a complaint is brought against an officer as part of an Early Warning System, there was in fact a reasonable expectation that the word "should" clearly indicated an obligation or duty or requirement.

In July 2015 an Atlantic City Police Officer was arrested by FBI Agents and charged with lying to federal authorities in reference to her relationship and dealings with a convicted drug dealer boyfriend .

In February 2017, An Atlantic City police officer was placed on an administrative assignment after a video surfaced showing him behaving inappropriately.

In February 2017, Atlantic City police officer Dayton Brown was arrested and charged with aggravated assault after an alleged domestic-violence incident involving his girlfriend.
