= Eicher Motors =

Indian multinational automobile manufacturing company pvt ltd

Eicher Motors Limited
- Type: Public
- Traded as: BSE: 505200; NSE: EICHERMOT; NSE NIFTY 50 constituent
- ISIN: INE066A01013
- Industry: Automotive
- Predecessor: Goodearth Company
- Founded: 1948; 78 years ago
- Founder: Vikram Lal
- Headquarters: New Delhi, India
- Area served: Worldwide
- Key people: S Sandilya (chairman); Siddhartha Lal (Executive Chairman)
- Products: Commercial vehicles; Motorcycles
- Revenue: ▲₹20,175 crore (US$2.1 billion) (2025)
- Operating income: ▲₹5,933 crore (US$620 million) (2025)
- Net income: ▲₹4,734 crore (US$490 million) (2025)
- Total assets: ▲₹27,174 crore (US$2.8 billion) (2025)
- Total equity: ▲₹21,296 crore (US$2.2 billion) (2025)
- Owner: Siddhartha Lal (49.28%)
- Number of employees: 4,899 (March 2020)
- Subsidiaries: Royal Enfield; VE Commercial Vehicles (54.4%)
- Website: www.eicher.in
- Footnotes; Financials as of 31 March 2025.

Eicher Motors Limited is an Indian multinational automotive company that manufactures motorcycles and commercial vehicles, headquartered in New Delhi. Eicher is the parent company of Royal Enfield, a manufacturer of middleweight motorcycles. It also manufactures Eicher branded trucks and buses, under a joint venture with Volvo Group.

== History ==
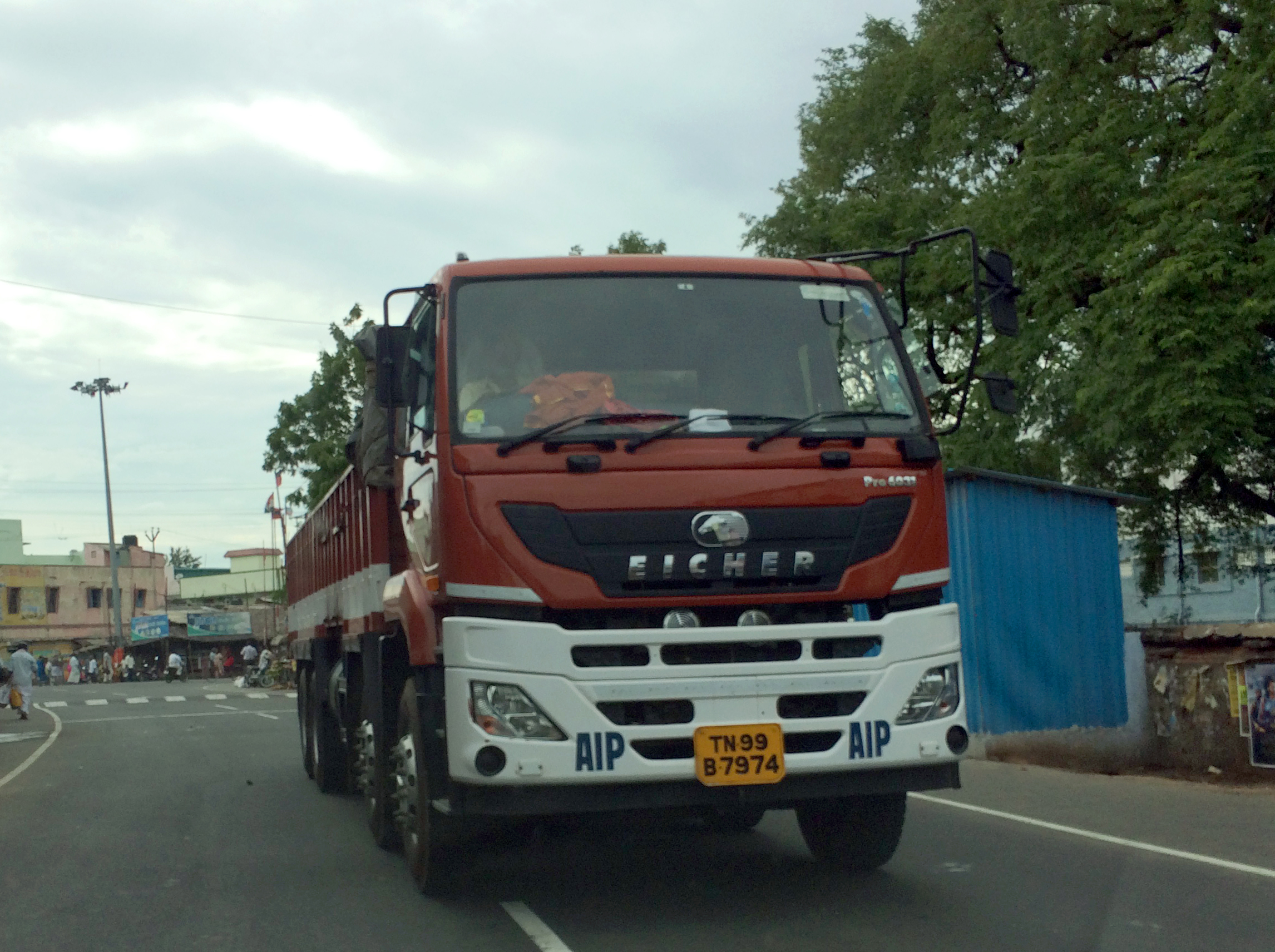
An Eicher multi-axle Torres Tempo

Eicher Motors Limited, the Indian company, is a commercial vehicle manufacturer in India. It traces its origins to the Goodearth Company, established in 1948 to sell and service imported tractors in India. In 1958, Eicher Tractor Corporation of India was established to manufacture tractors in India by Goodearth Company in collaboration with Eicher Tractors of Germany. The company manufactured its first indigenous tractor in 1959, and a year later changed its name to Eicher Tractors India Ltd.

Since 1965, Eicher in India has been completely owned by Indian shareholders. The German Eicher tractor was partly owned by Massey Ferguson from 1970, when they bought 30%. Massey Ferguson bought out the German company in 1973.

In 2005, Eicher Motors Ltd sold their tractors and engines business to TAFE Tractors (Tractors and Farm Equipment Ltd) of Chennai, the Indian licensee of Massey Ferguson tractors.

In October 1982, a collaboration agreement with Mitsubishi for the manufacture of light commercial vehicles (LCVs) was signed in Tokyo and in the same period the incorporation of Eicher Motors Limited also took place. LCVs were sold under the "Eicher Mitsubishi" brand. In February 1990, Eicher Goodearth bought 26% stake in Enfield India Ltd and by 1993 Eicher acquired a majority stake (60% equity shareholding) in Royal Enfield India.

In July 2008, Eicher Motors Limited (EML) and Volvo Group's formed a 50:50 joint venture called VE Commercial Vehicles (VECV) which designs, manufactures and markets commercial vehicles, engineering components and provides engineering design.

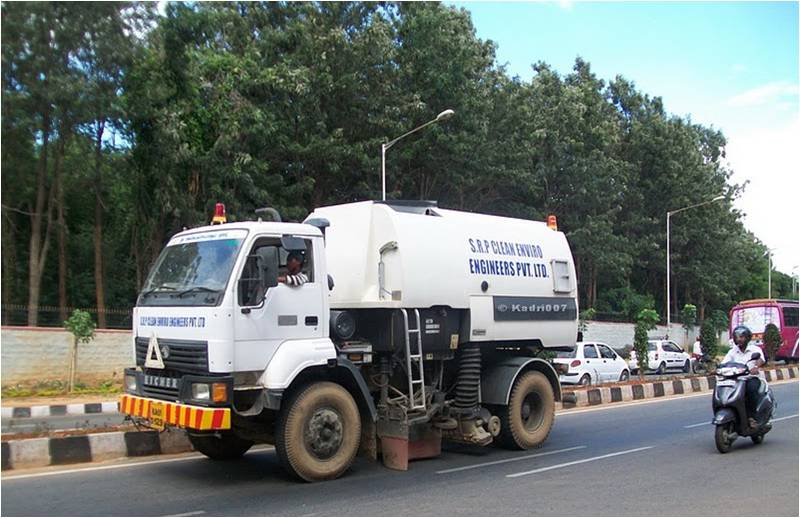
An Eicher Garbage Tempo transporting municipal solid waste

At present, Volvo Group owns 45.6% of VECV, while Eicher Motors holds the remaining 54.4%. In 2020, VECV bought Volvo Buses India operations for ₹100 crore.

In 2012, Eicher Motors started a joint venture with American company Polaris Industries called Eicher Polaris to make personal utility vehicles, starting with Eicher Polaris Multix in 2015. This joint venture company ceased operations in 2018.

== Group structure ==
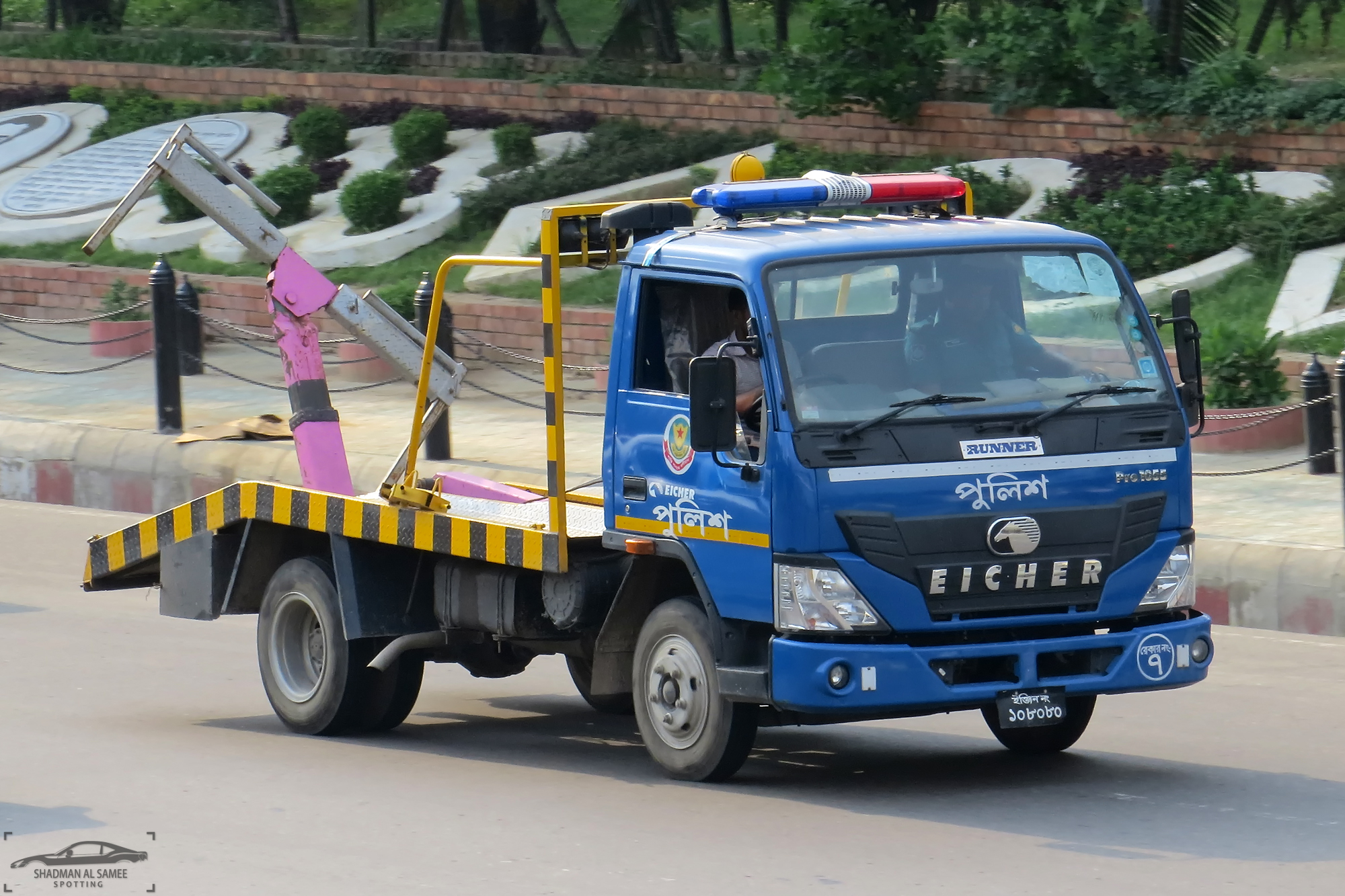
Eicher Recovery Tempo being used by the Bangladesh Police

The Eicher Group has business interests in design and development, manufacturing, and local and international marketing of trucks, buses, motorcycles, automotive gears, and components.

=== VE Commercial Vehicles ===
VE Commercial Vehicles (VECV) Limited is a joint venture between Volvo Group and Eicher Motors Limited. VECV is divided into six business units:

- Eicher Trucks/(Large/Small-size Tempo) and Buses/(Large/Small-size Van)
- Volvo Trucks (Large-Small Size Tempo) India
- Volvo Buses (Large-Small Size Van) India
- Eicher Engineering Components
- Eicher Power Solutions
- VE Powertrain

=== Royal Enfield Motors ===
Royal Enfield, a motorcycle manufacturer, is a subsidiary of Eicher Motors.

== Vehicles ==
- Eicher Large/Small-Size Tempo Trucks
- Eicher Buses/Large/Small-Size Vans
- Volvo Large/Small-Size Tempo Trucks
- Volvo Large/Small-Size Buses and Vans
- Royal Enfield Motorcycles

In the end of 2025 VE Commercial Vehicles unveiled their ProX line up of new small trucks under Eicher Trucks and Buses brand. The line-up was built from ground up because VECV never had small commercial trucks in any brand. First electric variants were launched with 32 and 40kwh lithium iron phosphate battery with 107hp and 250km range. Later diesel versions were launched with their all new E449 X2 engine a 4-cylinder 2 liter coupled with 5 Speed transmission with output of 80hp and 230nm of torque. The line-up has payload capacity of 1.3 to 1.8 tons with two cargo bed length options 9.8 and 10.8ft. The cabin has sitting capacity of driver plus two pax and built with Indian and European Safety Standards.

== Joint Ventures ==
=== VE Connected Solutions Pvt Ltd (VECS) ===
In May 2024 Volvo Eicher Commercial Vehicles Ltd started a 51:49 joint venture named VE Connected Solutions Pvt Ltd (VECS) with iTriangle Infotech Pvt Ltd a Bengaluru based vehicle tracking system company. The newly formed venture deals in Fleet management, Fleet telematics system, Driver scoring, Vehicle tracking system, Fleet digitalization and EV mobility solutions. By July 2027 the VECV will increase its share in venture from 51 to 74% for 11.01 million Indian rupees.

=== Volvo Financial Services (VFS) ===
Eicher Motors announces a new joint venture with Volvo Financial Services. In May 2026, Eicher Motors Limited announced a 50:50 joint venture with Volvo Financial Services (VFS) to provide financing, leasing, and other financial services for Volvo and Eicher-branded commercial vehicles in India. Eicher Motors approved an investment of up to ₹750 crore for a 50% equity stake in Volvo Financial Services India. The joint venture will serve as the captive financing arm for VECV, Eicher Motors, Volvo Group, and Royal Enfield products.
