= Polaris Inc. =

American automotive manufacturer

- Formerly: Polaris Industries Inc.
- Type: Public
- Traded as: NYSE: PII; S&P 400 component
- Industry: Motorsports; Automotive; Defense
- Founded: 1954; 72 years ago
- Founders: Edgar Hetteen; Allen Hetteen; David Johnson
- Headquarters: Medina, Minnesota, U.S.
- Area served: Worldwide (except Afghanistan, Cuba, Iran, Syria, and North Korea)
- Key people: Michael Speetzen (CEO)
- Products: Snowmobiles; All-terrain vehicles Motorcycles; Moto-Roadsters; Boats; Commercial vehicles Ultra-Light Tactical Vehicles; Parts, Garments and Accessories
- Revenue: ▼US$7.18 billion (2024)
- Operating income: ▼US$291 million (2024)
- Net income: ▼US$111 million (2024)
- Total assets: ▲US$5.53 billion (2024)
- Total equity: ▼US$1.29 billion (2024)
- Number of employees: 15,000 (2024)
- Divisions: Off-Road; On-Road; Marine
- Subsidiaries: Aixam; Kolpin; Goupil Industrie; Klim International: Polaris Europe; Polaris India
- Website: polaris.com

Polaris Inc. is an American automotive manufacturer headquartered in Medina, Minnesota, United States. Polaris was founded in Roseau, Minnesota, where it still has engineering and manufacturing facilities. The company manufactured motorcycles through its Victory Motorcycles subsidiary until January 2017, then produced motorcycles through the Indian Motorcycle subsidiary, which it purchased in April 2011 and announced its divestiture in October 2025. Polaris produced personal watercraft from 1994 to 2004. The company was originally named Polaris Industries Inc. and was renamed in 2019 to Polaris Inc.

Robin (a subsidiary of Subaru Corporation) previously developed and supplied all-terrain vehicle (ATV) and snowmobile engines for Polaris Inc. Starting in 1995 with the Polaris Magnum 425 4-stroke ATV and in 1997, with the introduction of the "twin 700" snowmobile engine Polaris started the development and production in house of the "Liberty" line of engines, now found in many models across their current production lines. Since that time Polaris has continued to develop their in-house engine production capacity, now designing and manufacturing all of their own power plants, while maintaining the partnership with Subaru.

In 2010, Polaris relocated a portion of its utility and sport vehicle assembly to Mexico. Components are manufactured in Osceola, Wisconsin and the vehicle assembly is done in Roseau, Minnesota. The vast majority of powertrain and vehicles for the off-road line are manufactured in the Osceola and Roseau facilities, respectively. Both the Victory and Indian motorcycle brands are American made with complete powertrains and vehicle assembly located in Osceola, Wisconsin, and Spirit Lake, Iowa, respectively.

== History ==
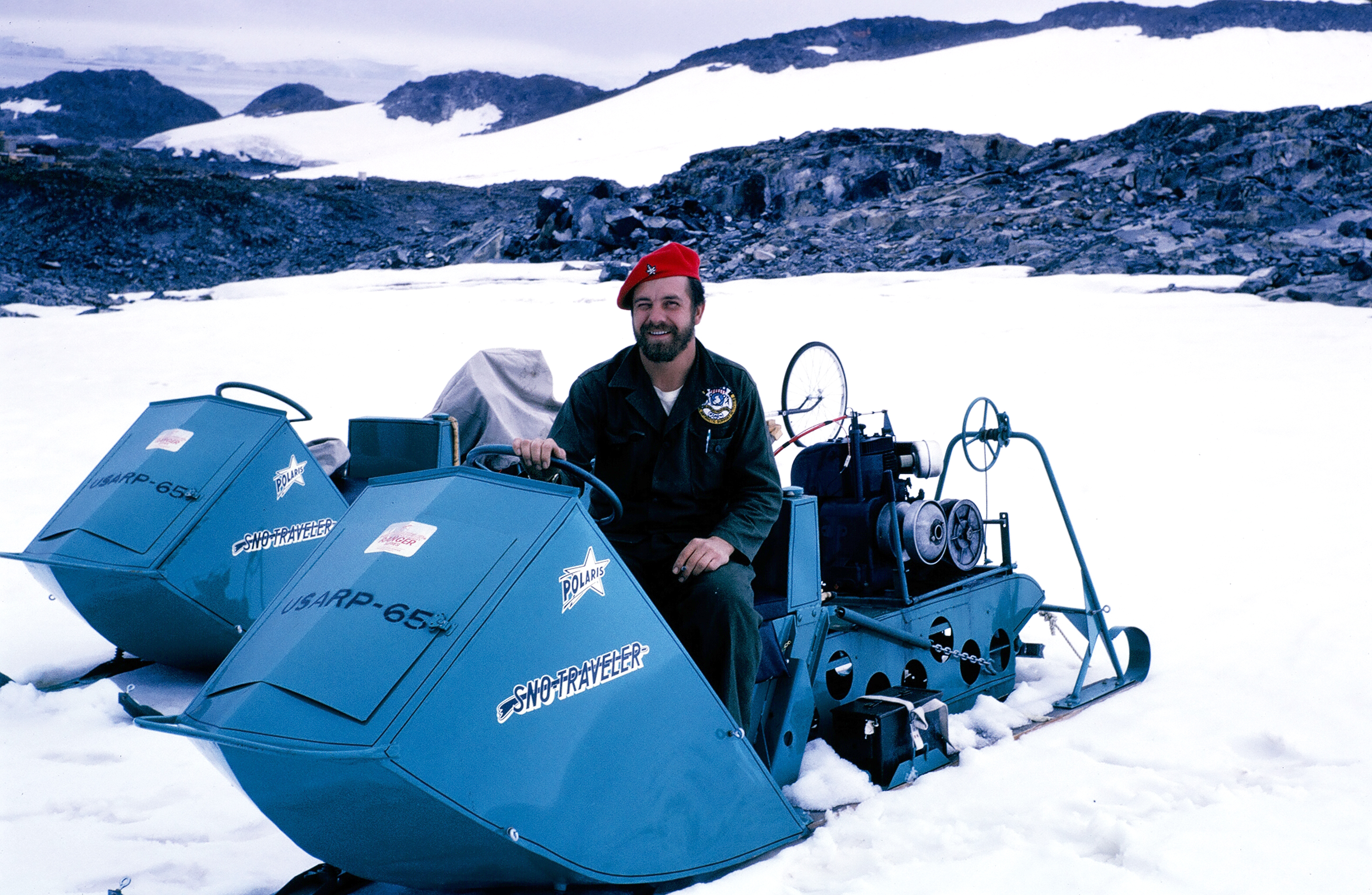
Polaris Sno Traveler (1965)

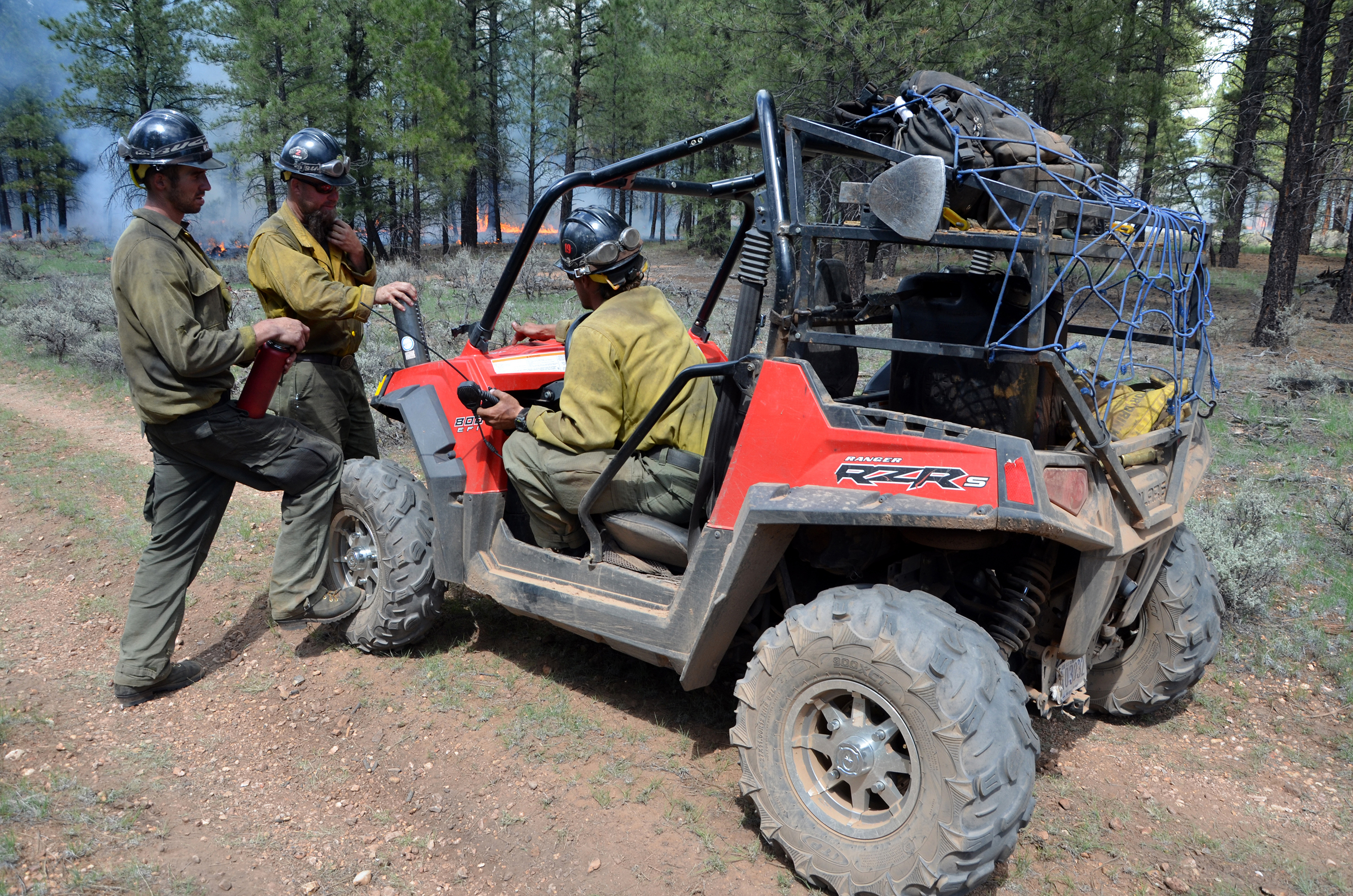
Polaris RZR ATV used by firefighters in the Kaibab National Forest

Edgar Hetteen (later described by the Snowmobile Hall of Fame in St. Germain, Wisconsin, as the father of the snowmobile), David Johnson, and Edgar's brother Allan Hetteen were partners in Hetteen Hoist and Derrick in Roseau, Minnesota. Edgar had dropped out of school after the eighth grade in 1934. David Johnson and company employees Paul Knochenmus and Orlen Johnson, who was the first person to ride a Polaris, decided to create a vehicle that could travel through snow. These vehicles' primary use was to make hunting locations more accessible. David Johnson and several employees created the prototype in 1954 while Edgar was on a business trip. Edgar returned to Roseau to discover the snow machine and was furious the employees had used their time and company resources on the machine. This first machine used a grain silo conveyor belt as a track, a Briggs and Stratton motor, and an old Chevy bumper for skis. Edgar was skeptical of its value, and the No. 1 sled was soon sold to Roseau lumberyard owner "Silver Pete" H.F. Peterson for $465 in order to meet company payroll.

However, the employees continued to focus on building snowmobiles and soon a second model was created, with Allan Hetteen leading the way; it was called the Polaris Sno Traveler. The first production model rolled off the assembly line in Minnesota in 1956. The original models weighed close to 1,000 lb (450 kg) and moved at a speed of about 20 mph (32 km/h). As Polaris snowmobiles gained sales traction, Edgar Hetteen became an advocate of the new product line. In order to promote the new snowmobile and prove its reliability and usefulness, in 1960 Edgar led a three-snowmobile, 1,200-mile trek across the Alaskan wilderness, starting from Bethel, Alaska. The trip took three weeks, and much of the time, Edgar struggled to maintain 10 mph over the snow. The Fairbanks Daily News-Miner put them on its front page. However, Edgar's absence caused problems for him with the Roseau bank's board of directors. Soon after completing the trip, Edgar left the company in June and started a competing company called Polar Manufacturing in Thief River Falls, Minnesota. The company name later changed to Arctic Enterprises; in the mid-1980s it filed for bankruptcy amid declining industry snowmobile sales with a recession and overproduction in a poor winter which continued the demise of many manufacturers. The company emerged from bankruptcy and continues on today as Arctic Cat.

Polaris began developing a smaller consumer-sized, front-engine snowmobile to compete with the Ski-Doo in the early 1960s. In 1964, Polaris released the Comet. However, the Comet soon ran into problems as it could not travel in all types of snow conditions. Polaris then recalled the sleds and quickly developed a new prototype to avoid bankruptcy. The new model, the 1965 Mustang, became a hit as a family snowmobile and boosted Polaris sales. Polaris continued to develop snowmobiles similar to this model throughout the 1960s–1970s, and went on to become one of the leaders in the snowmobile industry.

In the early 1980s, Polaris started creating an Indy style snowmobile with IFS and a wider stance. They continued with the Indy style sled in the 90s with the Storm, XLT, XCR, Ultra, RMK, and Trail lines, within the last few years Polaris has re-introduced the INDY model name. In 1985, Polaris introduced the Scrambler ATC and Trail Boss, which are considered to be the first American-made production all-terrain vehicles (ATV). In the early 1990s, Polaris introduced the Polaris Rocky Mountain King (RMK)- a snowmobile specific for mountain terrain. In May 2009, Polaris announced the creation of an On-Road Vehicle Division. The new division will be devoted to the growth of Victory motorcycles and other on-road products and brands. In 2010, Polaris introduced the Polaris Rush snowmobile which had a new suspension system and better trail handling capabilities. This snowmobile is also available with retro graphics on the Rush and Iq models. In late 2005, Polaris announced that it would purchase a portion of KTM Motorcycles. Through this venture KTM has developed their own ATV and Polaris has developed Sport ATVs which utilize the KTM 525 and 450 powerplants.

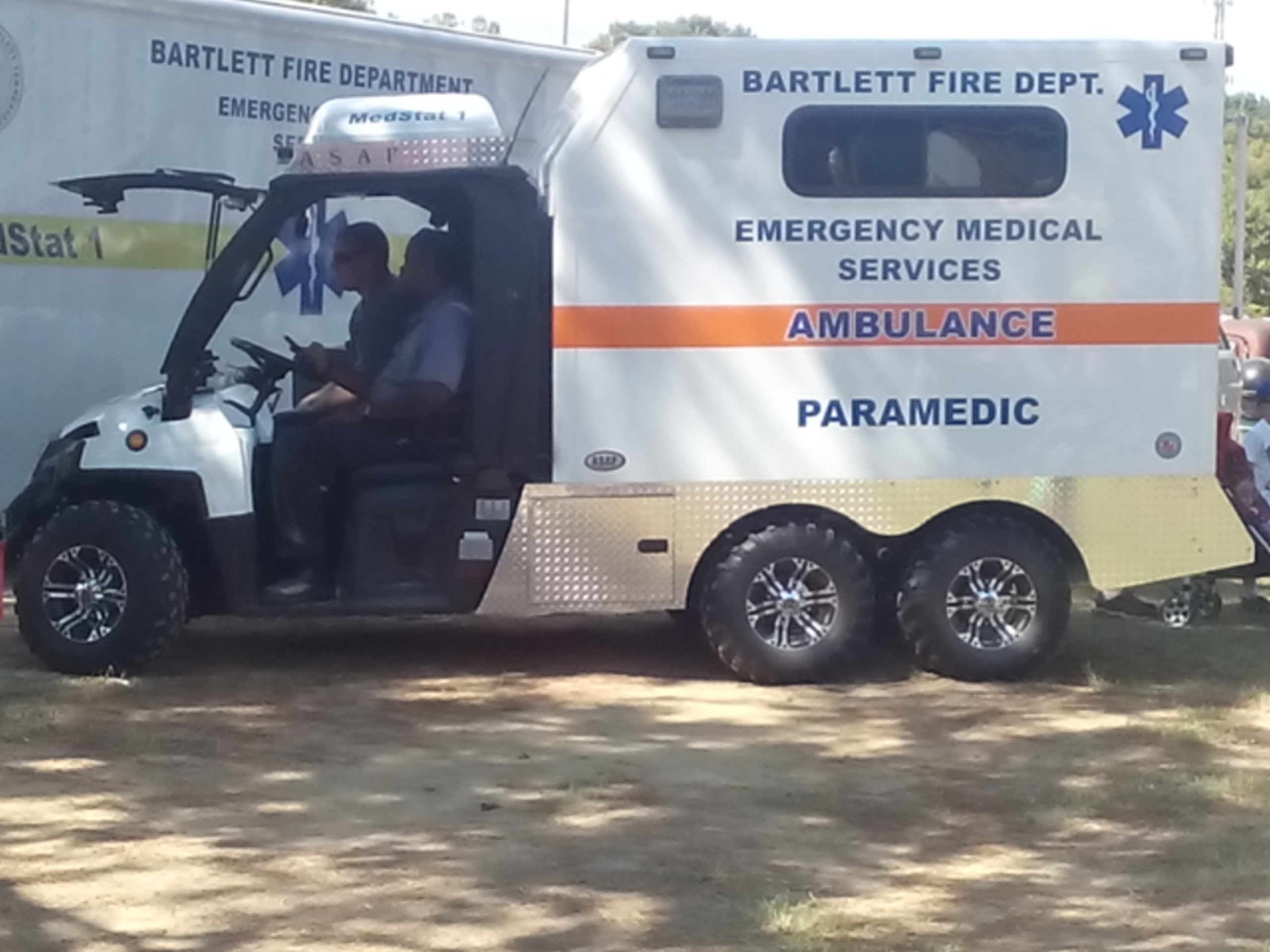
A Polaris Ranger modified as an ambulance

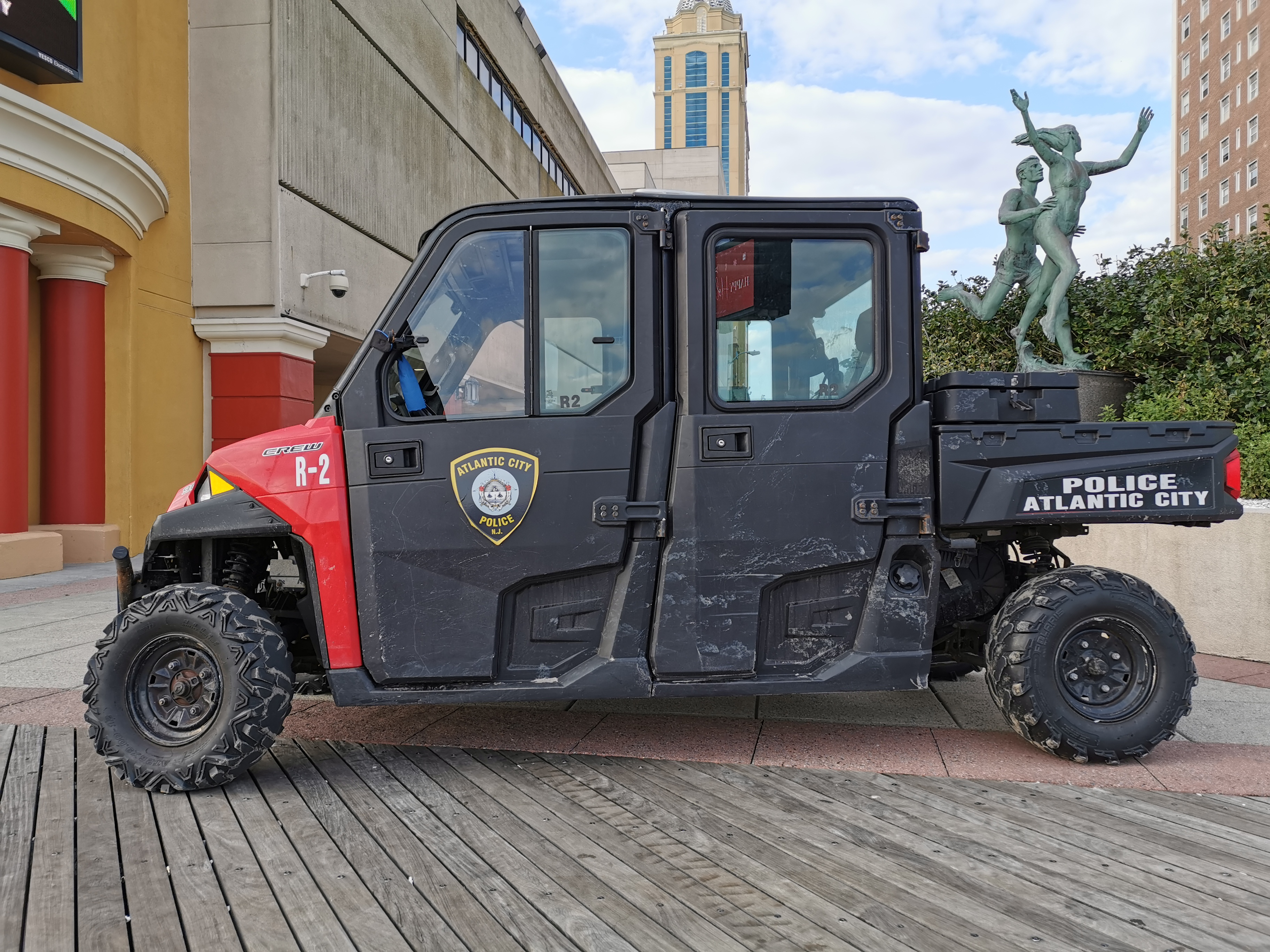
A Polaris Ranger patrols the Atlantic City Boardwalk under the authority of the Atlantic City Police Department.

On May 21, 2010, Polaris announced that it was opening a new manufacturing plant in Mexico. The sister facility in Osceola, Wisconsin still remains in full operation. The opening of the Monterrey, Mexico facility is anticipated to save the company $30 million annually, with most of that savings coming from lower wages. The Monterrey facility has 3 assembly lines devoted to production of Ranger side-by-sides for global markets. The original intent of the Monterrey facility was to serve markets in the Southern US plus Mexico and North America.

In October 2011, Polaris announced an investment in Brammo, Inc., an electric vehicle company based in Ashland, Oregon, United States. Its first production electric motorcycle, the Brammo Enertia, is assembled in Ashland and sold at dealerships. Polaris continued its investment in Brammo when it participated in the $13 million opening tranche of Brammo's Series C funding round in July 2012. Polaris had been showing interest in electric propulsion, producing an electric version of its Ranger Side-by-Side and more recently buying Global Electric Motorcars (GEM). As one publication put it, "This latest move likely signals the addition of clean and quiet drivetrains to ATVs and motorcycles under the global giant's brand umbrella – snowmobiles may have to wait on battery breakthroughs before they become commercially feasible." On January 15, 2015, Polaris announced that it had purchased the entire electric motorcycle business from Brammo. Production of electric motorcycles was slated to commence at Polaris' factory in Spirit Lake, Iowa during the second half of 2015. Polaris also manufactures Victory and Indian motorcycles at the Spirit Lake factory.

In 2012, production restarted on the Indy-named sleds (stopped in 2004 with the Indy 500) with the release of the 2013 Indy 600 and Indy 600 SP. For 2014, Polaris will expand the Indy name and provide model variants for nearly all categories (the one exception being the "Mountain" class).

On April 11, 2013, Polaris announced that it acquired Aixam-Mega, a French quadricycle manufacturer.

On January 9, 2015, Polaris announced it will be opening a new 600,000-square-foot facility in Huntsville, Alabama that will employ at least 1,700 workers. Construction on the new manufacturing plant is set to start in early 2015 and should be opened by the spring of 2016. The plant will support several core processes including, vehicle assembly, chassis and body painting, welding, fabrication and injection molding.

On March 7, 2016, Polaris acquired Taylor-Dunn, a manufacturer of industrial vehicles based in Anaheim, CA.

On January 9, 2017, Polaris Chairman and CEO Scott Wine announced they would be shutting down Victory Motorcycles. They announced they will continue to honor warranties and produce parts for Victory Motorcycles for the next 10 years.

In April 2018, Polaris Industries agreed to pay a record $27.25 million civil penalty for failing to report defective off-road vehicles.

In May 2018, Polaris reentered the production of boats by purchasing the Indiana-based Boat Holdings LLC for $805 million. The company invested further in its boating division in January 2019 with the acquisition of Marquis-Larson Boat Group out of Pulaski, Wisconsin. Production of Marquis-Larson moved to a facility in Syracuse, Indiana. They then went on to make the Polaris Slingshot, a three-wheeler.

On July 29, 2019, the company changed its name from Polaris Industries Inc. to Polaris Inc. and commenced trading with the new name on August 8, 2019.

On July 20, 2023, Polaris bought Walker Evans Racing.

In 2023, the company launched the all-electric Ranger XP Kinetic (electric motor and electric transmission). In 2022, Godfrey's Mighty G Pontoon was launched, compatible with either electric or gas propulsion, with consumers favoring electric rigs.

In October 2025 Polaris announced the sale of Indian Motorcycle to private equity firm Carolwood LP, with Polaris retaining a minority stake in the new company.

== Leadership ==
- Edgar Hetteen (1954–1960)
- Allan Hetteen & David Johnson (1960–1980)
- W. Hall Wendel, Jr. (1980–2008)
- Scott W. Wine (2008–2020)
- Michael (Mike) Speetzen (2021–Present)

== Racing ==
Polaris Racing is one of the big four factory racing teams on the World Power Sports Association (WPSA) Snocross circuit. With 44 signed riders, they also run in Hill Cross, Oval Track Racing, and Cross Country Racing. The Polaris Racing Team won 8 different Championships in the 2006–2007 season. Arnar Gunnarsson (#26) won the Pro Open, Gústi (#10) won Pro Stock, Klara Björk (#89) won pro women at Iceland, T. J. Gulla (#44) won the WPSA Pro Stock Championship, Ross Martin (#837) won the WPSA Pro Open Championship, and Kylie Abramson (#87) won the WPSA Pro Women's Championship. Gabe Bunke (#74) has won the USCC Pro 600 Class Championship and USCC Pro Open Class. Dustin Wahl (#74) won the Pro Ice 440 Championship, the Pro Ice Formula Championship, and the Millennium 600 Open championship, and John Cyr III (#99) won the 2004 USCC Pro 700 Class Championship. Most all of the Polaris Racing riders drive the IQR 440, 600 or 700 Racer, depending on the class and the event. Polaris holds the most wins in the World's Longest, Toughest Snowmobile Race, the Iron Dog, a 2,000 mile race across Alaska.

== Polaris Government and Defense ==
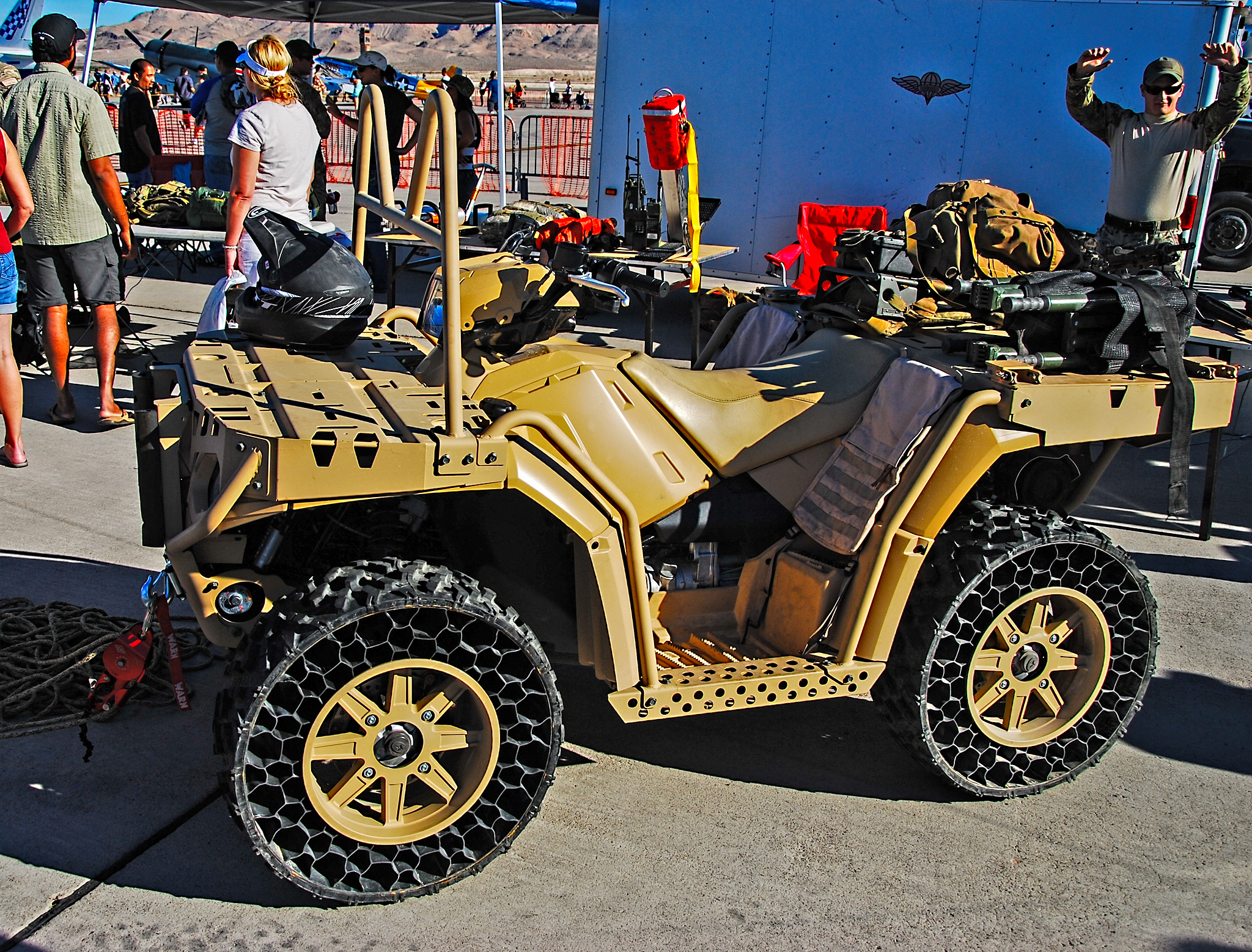
The straddled Sportsman MV850 is Polaris' smallest military vehicle, and has a 850 lb payload.

Polaris Government and Defense (formerly Polaris Defense) is a division of Polaris Industries founded in 2005 and re-branded in 2017. The division was created after years of successful implementation of the company's off-road vehicles in military theater. The division produces a range of vehicles to serve the United States and allied forces. Products include the MRZR platform, MVRS, MV700, RZR-SW and the DAGOR.

=== MRZR ===
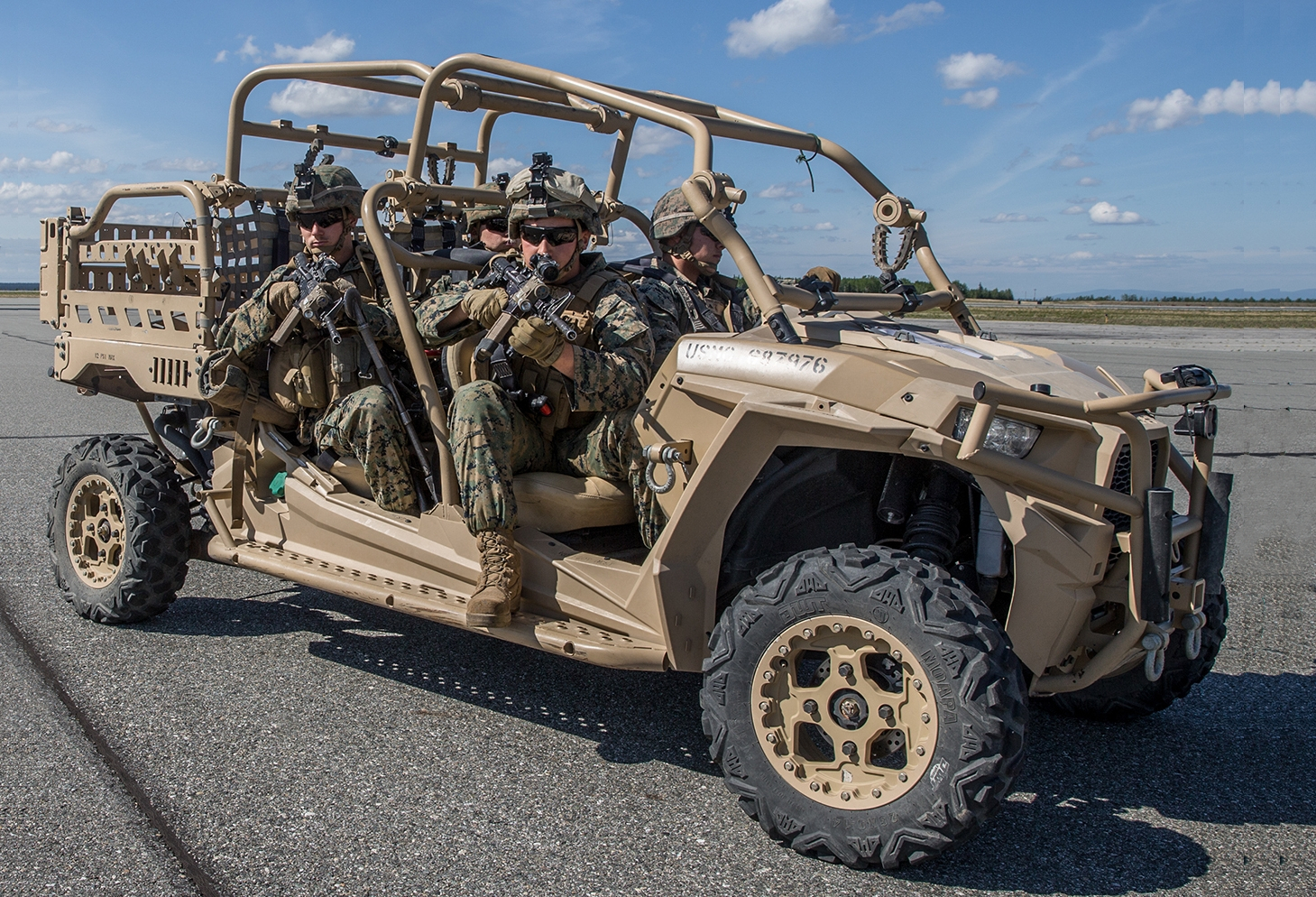
MRZR tactical all-terrain vehicle

In November 2016, the U.S. Marine Corps signed a $6.5 million contract with Polaris to deliver 145 MRZR-D ATVs. Called the Utility Task Vehicle (UTV), it is a version of the vehicle already in use by U.S. Special Operations Command, but is designed to be diesel-powered and can run on JP-8 fuel. The Marines bought the unarmored ATVs because they can fit inside an MV-22 Osprey, enabling them to be deployed from long distances, to provide logistics support to ground combat units, assisting them to travel and transport supplies quicker and easier than previously on foot. The vehicles can carry four troops and have a small cargo bed capable of carrying 1,500 lb (680 kg) of payload. It is planned to field 18 MRZR-Ds per infantry regiment. The vehicles were delivered between late-January to April 2017.

=== DAGOR ===
DAGOR
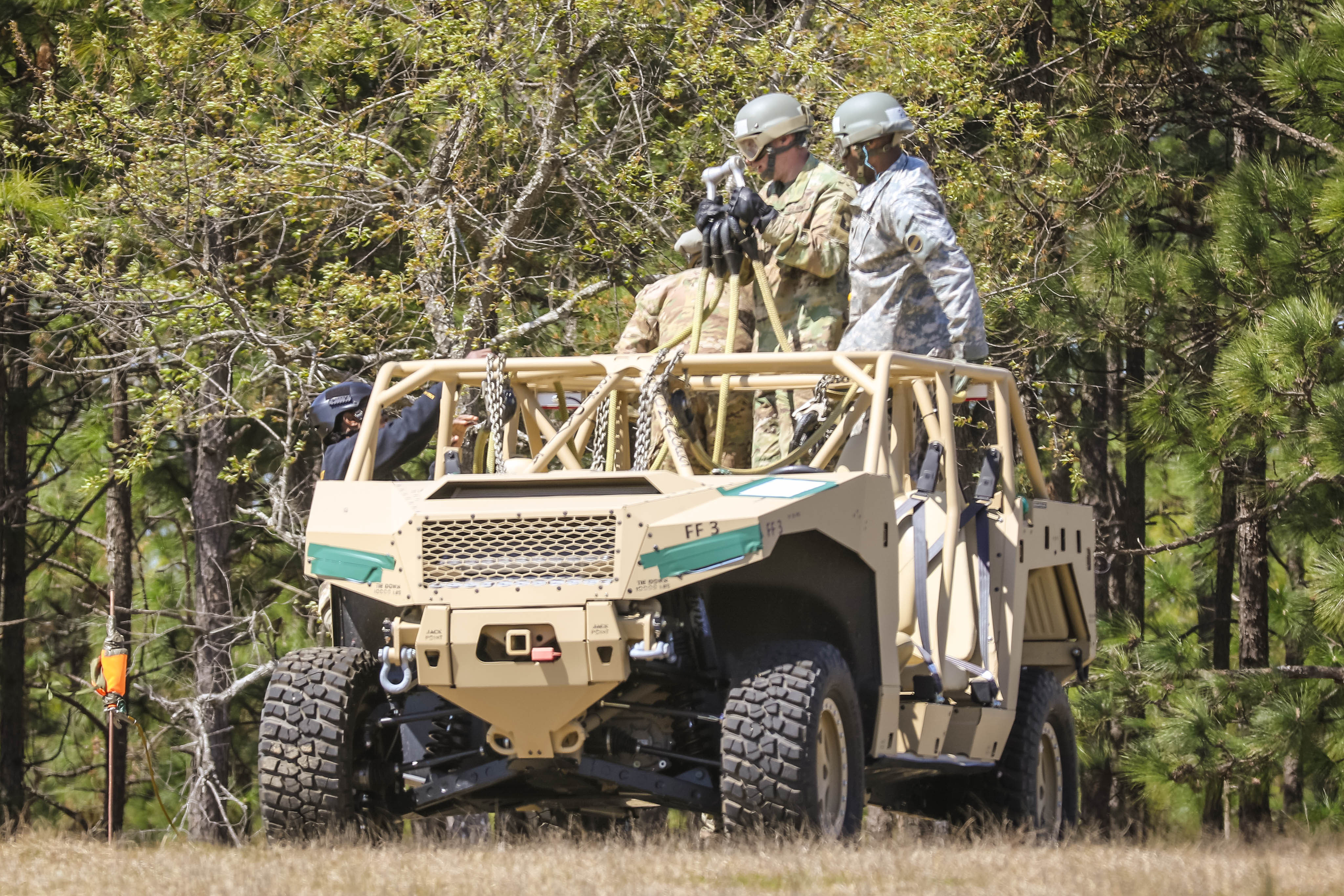
- A DAGOR being prepared to be sling loaded onto a UH-60 Black Hawk helicopter
- Place of origin: United States

Service history
- In service: 2014–present

Production history
- Manufacturer: Polaris Government and Defense
- Produced: 2014

Specifications
- Mass: Curb weight: 2,000 kg (4,500 lb); A1: 3,900 kg (8,500 lb)
- Length: Overall: 4.52 m (178 in)
- Width: Overall: 1.88 m (74 in)
- Height: Top of roll cage: 1.84 m (72.5 in)
- Crew: Up to 9
- Engine: Diesel/JP8
- Payload capacity: 1,470 kg (3,250 lb); A1: 1,810 kg (4,000 lb)
- Operational range: 800 km (500 mi)

DAGOR (Deployable Advanced Ground Off-road) is a purpose-built military off-road vehicle that is designed for rapid external and internal air transportability and that incorporates commercial off-the-shelf (COTS) components and driveline system with spares available worldwide. The DAGOR was developed under contract from elements of the United States Special Operations Command and international Special Operations Forces (SOF). The vehicle was designed in partnership with Roush Industries over two years who are also responsible for production. The DAGOR was unveiled at the 2014 Association of the United States Army Annual Meeting in October 2014. The DAGOR can accommodate up to nine soldiers: four in the cabin, four in the bed, and a roof gunner who has a seat suspended from the roll cage in the cabin.

The vehicle can be configured in up to 48 different weapon configurations using the weapons ring and multiple pintle mounts. The vehicle is powered by a lightweight, commercial off-the-shelf turbo diesel / JP8 engine. The vehicle can transport a maximum payload of more than 1,400 kg. It has high mobility with high speeds over rough terrain. The vehicle is certified for air drop and internal air transport by CH-47 Chinook heavy-lift helicopter, and sling load under UH-60 Black Hawk utility helicopters. The vehicle supports low velocity air drop (LVAD) method.

In March 2018, Polaris unveiled the DAGOR A1, which can carry 20% more payload than the original DAGOR, and also has increased ride height.

==== Operators ====
- Australia: Special Operations Command were scheduled to receive the first five vehicles in January 2015 to trial.
- Austria: Jagdkommando
- Canada: In December 2016, the Canadian Special Operations Forces Command (CANSOFCOM) announced that a contract was awarded for the acquisition of 52 ULCV with the option to procure an additional 26 vehicles over a two-year period. In July 2017, CANSOFCOM exercised the option to procure an additional 10 ULCV, bringing the total number of ULCV to 62.
- Romania: Ordered more than 50 vehicles in 2023.
- Turkmenistan
- United Arab Emirates: Deliveries were scheduled for the United Arab Emirates in April 2015.
- United States
  - Special Operations Command were scheduled to receive the first fifteen vehicles in November 2014.
  - 82nd Airborne Division

== See also ==
- Eicher Polaris Multix, a personal utility vehicle manufactured by Eicher Motors and Polaris India.
- Polaris Slingshot, a three-wheeled motor vehicle
- Boeing Phantom Badger, a combat vehicle platform similar to the DAGOR.
