= Klim (clothing) =

American motorsports clothing company

- Company type: Subsidiary
- Industry: Motor sports Clothing & Apparel
- Founded: 1999; 27 years ago
- Headquarters: Rigby, Idaho, U.S.
- Products: Clothing
- Parent: Polaris Inc.
- Website: https://www.klim.com/

Klim (pronounced "climb" /klaɪm/) is an American motorsports clothing and safety equipment manufacturer based in Rigby, Idaho. Its focus includes ranges for snowmobiling, and street and off-road motorcycling.

Klim was purchased by Polaris Inc. in 2012 and is now a wholly owned subsidiary.

== History ==
Started in 1994 as Teton Outfitters in Salt Lake City, Utah, Justin Summers began by producing specialized snowsuits for winter industry insiders after seeing the need for high quality protective gear.

The name changed to Klim in 1999 as the company relocated to Idaho.

Starting in 2005, the company began developing off-road motorcycle gear for the snowmobile off-season. Further, in 2009, the adventure motorcycling community was exploding; as such, the company used their knowledge of winter and off-road motorsports to develop rugged riding gear.
