= Siddhartha Lal =

Indian businessman (born 1973)

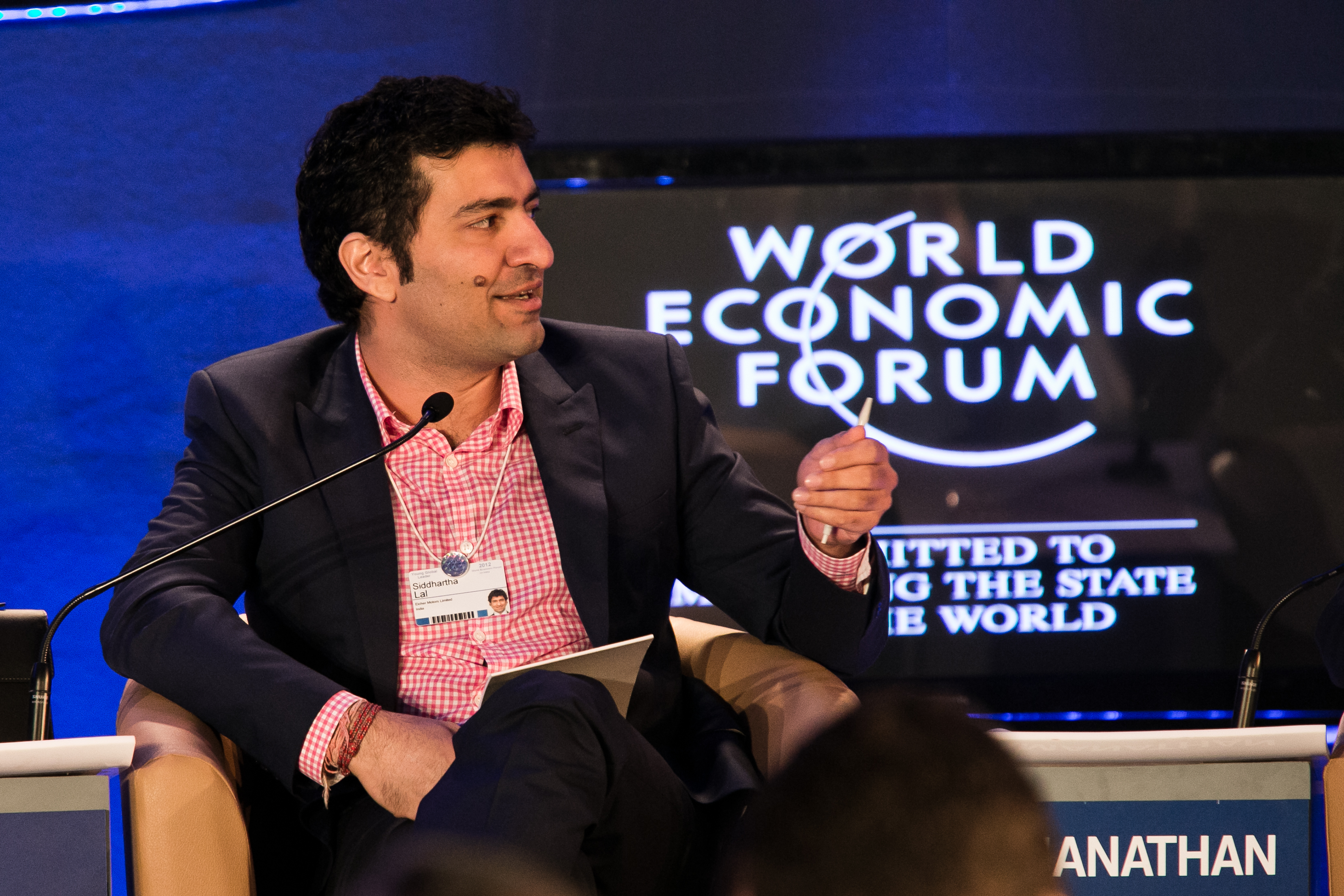
- Lal in 2012
- Born: October 1973 (age 52)
- Education: The Doon School
- Alma mater: St. Stephen's College, Delhi; Cranfield University (PgD); University of Leeds (MSc)
- Occupation: Businessman
- Years active: 1999–
- Known for: Revival of Royal Enfield
- Title: Executive Chairman, Eicher Motors; Chairman & MD, VE Commercial Vehicles Limited
- Spouse: Natasha Lal
- Father: Vikram Lal
- Website: Siddhartha Lal

Siddhartha Vikram Lal (born October 1973) is an Indian businessman. The son of businessman Vikram Lal, Siddhartha Lal is the executive chairman of Eicher Motors, a director of Eicher Goodearth and chairman and MD (Managing Director) of VE Commercial Vehicles. Lal is known for the turnaround and revival of Royal Enfield.

He received the EY Entrepreneur of the Year Award for the year 2018.

== Early life and education ==
Siddhartha Vikram Lal is the son of Vikram Lal, who was the founder and chief executive officer of Eicher Motors. He has a sister, Simran Lal. Like his father, Siddhartha attended The Doon School for his secondary education. After completing his secondary education in 1994, Lal attended St. Stephen's College of the University of Delhi for a bachelor's degree in economics. Between 1996 and 1998, he attained a postgraduate diploma in mechanical engineering from Cranfield University, and a master's degree in automotive engineering from the University of Leeds in England.

== Career ==
Lal, after completing his education, started working with MAN Nutzfahrzeuge AG. Before he joined Eicher Motors, his father, Vikram, sent him to Europe to interact with Royal Enfield motorcycle importers in the continent. Lal joined Eicher Motors in 1999, working in various capacities in the Eicher tractor division and he also created the company's geographic information system and maps division.

Lal then became CEO of Royal Enfield in 2000 (at the age of 26). Initially, Lal's responsibility as CEO of Royal Enfield, which was on the verge of being sold due to the company's problems, was to fix the unit's products, financial and operational issues. From 2000 to 2004, he worked out of Royal Enfield's headquarters in Chennai, introducing cost-cutting measures and product upgrades. "Honestly, at age 26, it seemed a fun thing to do. I could eat, sleep, ride and talk motorcycles," Lal said in a 2015 interview. To solve the issues in Royal Enfield, Lal brought in a new client servicing team to address the concerns of motorcycle dealers and he used his engineering knowledge to improve the motorcycle engines, which resulted in the company increasing its sales.

In January 2004, Lal was appointed as the chief operating officer (COO) of Eicher Motors. In 2005, he sold 13 of the 15 businesses of Eicher Motors and decided to allocate resources to Royal Enfield and the trucks business. Lal took this decision as he thought that in these two businesses, his business could become market leaders. In May 2006, Lal took over as the chief executive officer (CEO) and managing director (MD) of Eicher Motors. In 2008, he transferred Eicher Motors' truck business was transferred to VE Commercial Vehicles (VECV), which is a joint venture with Volvo, a Swedish automotive company. Lal's reason for forming a joint venture with Volvo was to become one of the largest competitors in India's truck market. He also convinced Volvo to make its 160 hp to 300 hp engines for light and medium trucks through their joint venture by convincing Volvo of using the low engineering costs in India to help with the returns from the exports of the engines. Later, Lal also secured a concession from Volvo, allowing Eicher Motors to use some of the engines that VECV was manufacturing for Volvo in Eicher Motors' heavy-duty vehicles in India. This was significant because Eicher Motors had faced challenges in developing its own engines for use in the company's trucks. In 2019, Lal stepped down as the CEO of Royal Enfield.

In August 2021, during the annual general meeting of Eicher Motors, shareholders of the company rejected Lal's reappointment as MD due to disagreements about an increase in his remuneration. In September 2021, Eicher Motors once again approached shareholders to reappoint Lal as MD and with a revised remuneration plan. In October 2021, the company's shareholders approved Lal’s reappointment as MD and his remuneration package for the next 5 years. In February 2025, Lal was appointed as the Executive Chairman of Eicher Motors.

=== Positions held ===
Position	Company
Executive Chairman	Eicher Motors
MD	Eicher Motors
Director	Eicher Goodearth Limited
Chairman	VE Commercial Vehicles
Director	Eicher Goodearth Holdings

== Personal life ==
Siddhartha Lal relocated from Delhi to London, in August 2015, in order to be close to Royal Enfield's new R&D centre in Leicestershire. "We are in the process of developing engines for the international markets and lots of developmental work is happening in the UK. It is for that I have decided to move to the UK for one year," he said.
