= Eicher tractor =

Defunct automobile manufacturer

- Type: GmbH
- Industry: Tractor, Engines
- Founded: 1936
- Defunct: 1962
- Fate: Merger
- Headquarters: Wiesbaden, Germany
- Area served: worldwide
- Key people: Josef & Albert Eicher
- Revenue: 645M
- Number of employees: 35000

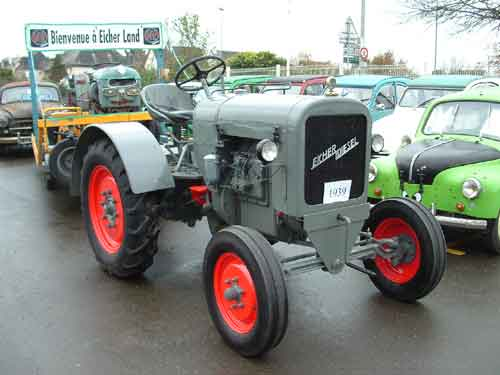
Tractor Eicher Diesel 22PSI - 1939

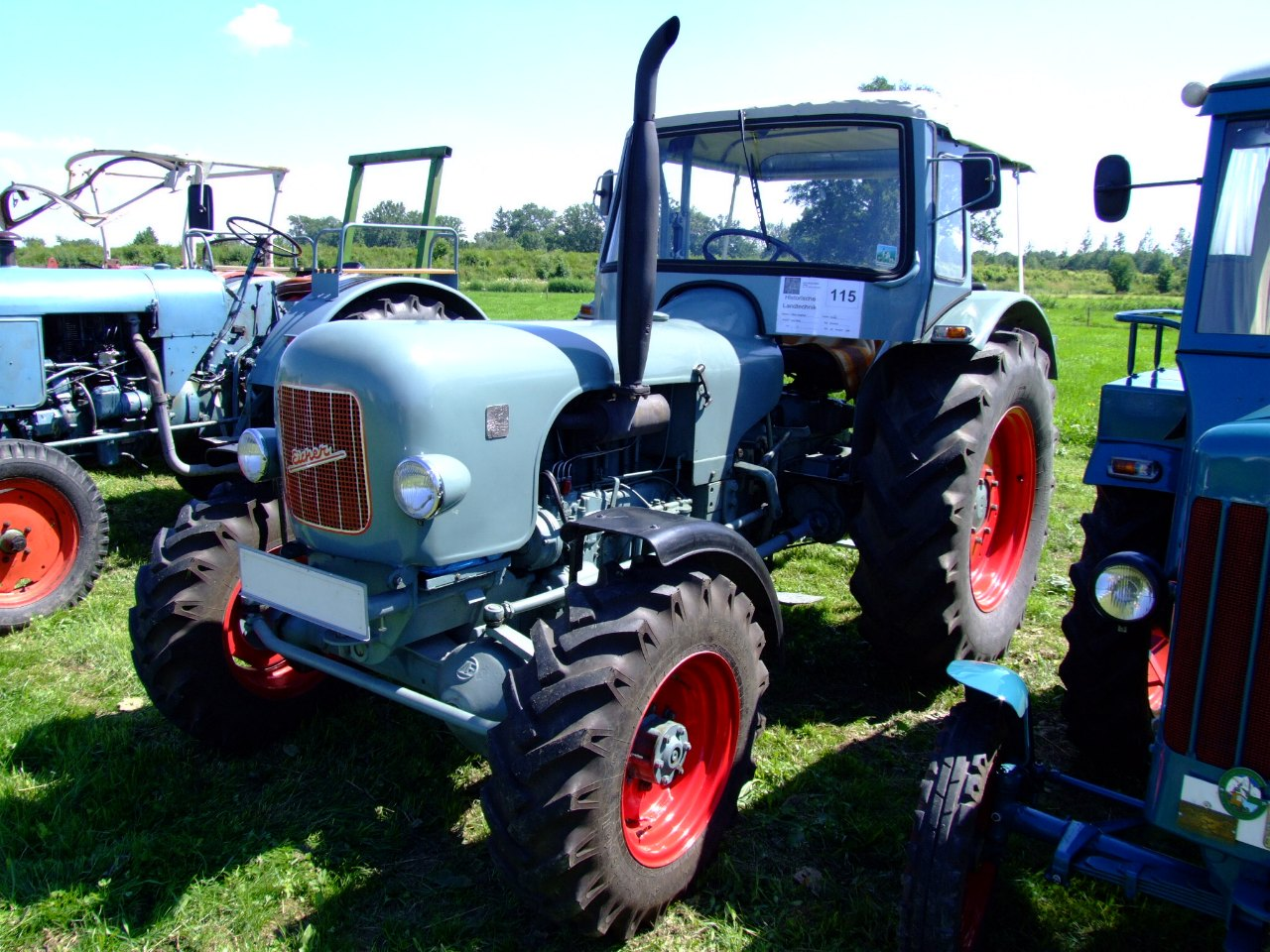
Eicher tractor

Eicher tractor was a manufacturer of tractors, agricultural machinery and engines. The company was founded in 1936 by the brothers Josef and Albert Eicher in the Upper Bavaria town of Forstern. The brand name "Eicher" was last used in Europe in 2009 by the Dutch agricultural machinery dealer Hissink & Zonen and is still in use today in India by Eicher Motors, which manufactures tractors & commercial vehicles by this name.

== History ==
The first Eicher tractor was made by Joseph and Albert Eicher in the 1930s, in the village of Forstern, near Munich, in Bavaria, Germany. It was the beginning of considerable development of Eicher's Forstern and Dingolfing factories. These pioneers made several tests and carried out a patient work of clarification. The first evolution was marked by the construction of an automatic mower and a three-wheeled tractor. In 1936, Eicher built the first diesel tractor with a 14.7 kW (20 hp) Deutz – diesel engine. The engine was welded to the frame and the rear axle was flanged. The gearbox was attached to the engine and passed the power via a propeller shaft to the rear axle. The mowing drive went from there via an open chain drive. One year later, in 1937, Eicher was represented for the first time at the DLG exhibition in Munich. The block-construction of the Eicher tractors with engines of Deutz and transmission of Prometheus prevailed in the following years. More and more tractors were sold, even tractors could be exported to Austria.

Eicher brothers Joseph and Albert Eicher were born and grew up in an agricultural part of Germany. Their personal taste for agriculture favored the development of ideas which led to the manufacturing of machines and modern devices.

== After the war ==
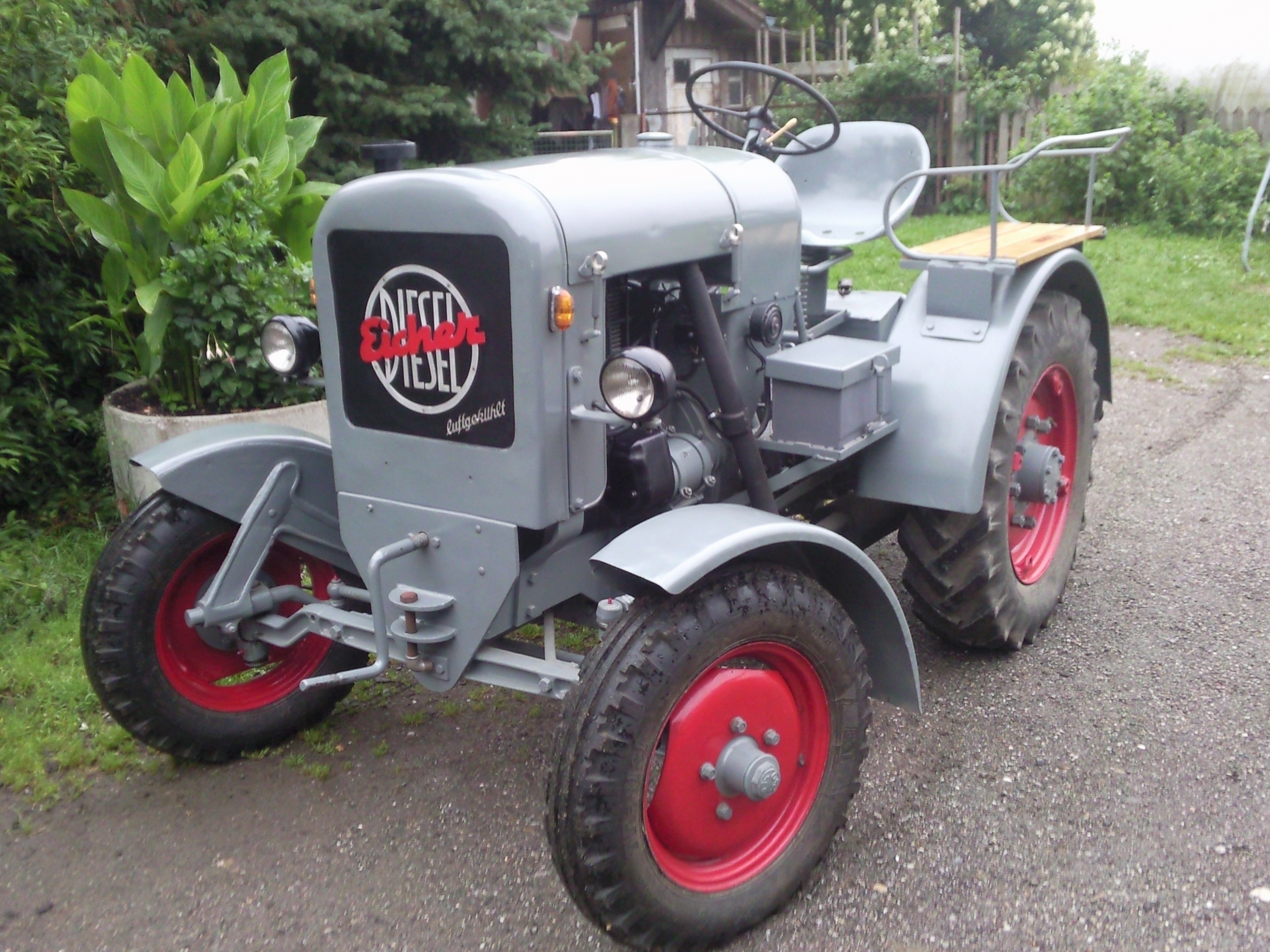
Eicher ED 16, 1948

After the war, production of pre-war tractors resumed. In 1948, the first post-war development was finally presented, the Eicher ED 16/I. Eicher tractor equipped with a self-welded engine (ED1). The single-cylinder engine produced 11.8 kW (16 hp). The Eicher ED 16/I was the world's first tractor with an air-cooled diesel engine. The air-cooled engines should be a badge of Eicher Tractors later. In the following years, the product range was greatly expanded, with the models Eicher ED 30 (1949), Eicher ED 25 / I (1950) and Eicher ED 28 (1953). The name component ED stood for Eicher Diesel, also the production increased constantly.

Eicher acquired on July 1, 1951, the vehicle and mechanical engineering GmbH (Famag) in Dingolfing. This expanded the company in a much greater depth, because with Famag it also got its own foundry . The trailer production of Famag was continued by Eicher for the time being. The brothers Eicher wanted to raise their own production for agricultural machinery. Thus, Eicher developed into a supplier of tractors and agricultural machinery.

In 1959, Eicher set up the Eicher Tractor Corporation of India Private Ltd., along with the Goodearth Company of New Delhi, India, and began production in 1960 of Indian-built Eicher tractors. That company sold the tractor business to TAFE, also of India, which still produces Eicher tractors.

In the 1960s, Eicher started the production of a light truck, which was also produced for Magirus at a later date.

In 1973, Massey Ferguson purchased Eicher, and many Massey-licensed Eichers were built. They later sold their interest, and Dromson now owns the company. They now build specialized tractors for vineyards.

In 2008, Eicher tractors were offered again at short notice by the brand owner Eicher Landmaschinen Vertriebs GmbH. These were the Eicher 677 and Eicher 777 models, which the former Dutch Eicher importer Hissink Oeken had manufactured by Carraro in Italy. This production also ended in 2009.

== See also ==
- Fendt
- Hanomag
- Claas
- Lanz Bulldog
