= Kukas =

Kukas kookas
- City
- Location of Kukas in Rajasthan Location of Jaipur in India
- Coordinates: 27.0338°N 75.8877°E
- Country: India
- State: Rajasthan
- District: Jaipur

Government
  - Type: chairman
  - Body: municipal council

Area
  - Total: 43 km^{2} (17 sq mi)
- Elevation: 431 m (1,414 ft)

Population
  - Total: 235,536
  - Density: 5,500/km^{2} (14,000/sq mi)

Languages
  - Official: Hindi
- Time zone: UTC+5:30 (IST)
- PIN: 302028
- Vehicle registration: RJ-14

Kukas is a Part of Jaipur metropolitan region and industrial town near Amber. It is about 10 km from Amber Fort. The presence of a RIICO industrial park in Kukas has led to the development of many local colleges, Hotels and businesses to support the industrial park. Kukas is situated on Delhi National Highway.

== Transport ==
Kukas can be mostly reached via buses. Government bus service can be taken from Sindhi Camp bus stand of Jaipur and Badi Chaupar bus stop of Old Jaipur. Private bus services include buses on route no. 29. JCTSL also runs AC1 on this route, which are run by the Rajasthan government.
